= List of gas station chains in North America =

This is a list of major gas station chains in the United States, Canada, and Mexico. For notable single filling stations, see List of historic filling stations.

== Filling station chains in North America ==
- Aloha Petroleum
- Alon
- Amoco
- ARCO
- BP
- Buc-ee's
- Byrne Dairy
- Casey's General Stores
- CENEX
- Certified
- Chevron
- Circle K
- Citgo
- Clark Brands
- Conoco
- Costco (Kirkland brand gasoline)
- Crown
- Cumberland Farms
- DK
- EddieWorld
- Exxon
- Family Express – Indiana
- Flying J
- GasAmerica
- Gas City, Ltd. -defunct Frankfort, Illinois- based company
- Getty
- Go-Mart
- Gulf
- Hele
- High's Dairy Stores
- Holiday
- Irving Oil
- Jacksons Food Stores
- King Soopers
- Krist
- Kroger brand gasoline
- Kum & Go
- Kwik Trip
- Kwik Fill
- Love's
- Lukoil
- Marathon Oil
- Maverik
- Meijer
- Minit Mart
- Mobil
- Murphy USA
- OXXO Gas
- Pemex
- Petro Canada
- Phillips 66
- Pilot
- QuickChek
- QuikTrip
- RaceTrac/Raceway
- Redner's
- Road Ranger
- Royal Farms
- Rutter's Farm Stores
- 7-Eleven brand gasoline
- 76
- Sam's Club
- Safeway
- Sheetz
- Shell
- Sinclair
- Speedway
- Stewart's Shops
- Sunoco
- Tesoro
- Terrible Herbst
- Texaco
- Thorntons Inc.
- Total
- TravelCenters of America
- Turkey Hill Minit Markets
- Valero
- Wally's
- Walmart brand gasoline
- Wawa

=== Canada ===
A list of gas station chains in Canada:

- Canadian Tire Petroleum (Canadian Tire Gas+) – over 300 stations across Canada; most located next to Canadian Tire retail stores or at service centres such as ONRoute
- Chevron Corporation – under license by Parkland Corporation (British Columbia, Alberta)
- Domo Gasoline – 80 stations in western Canada
- Esso – supplies approximately 2000 stations across Canada owned by various companies that use the Esso name under license from Imperial Oil, which is majority-owned by Exxon
- Fas Gas Plus – approximately 180 stations in western Canada
- Federated Co-operatives – Refine and supply 386 service stations in their network of independent co-operatives.
- Irving Oil – 769 stations in Atlantic Canada, Québec, eastern Ontario and New England
- Mobil – 233 stations acquired by Brookfield Business Partners from Loblaw Companies in 2017 and changed to the Mobil banner under licence from Imperial Oil
- OLCO Petroleum Group – 319 stations in Ontario and Quebec
- Petro-Canada – 1323 stations and 200 Petro-Pass stations across Canada; some acquired from BP (1983), Petrofina (1981) and Gulf Oil in the 1980s
- Pioneer Petroleum – 130 stations in Ontario
- 7-Eleven brand gasoline
- Shell Canada – Canadian unit of Shell with 1800 stations across Canada
- Ultramar – 983 service stations, 87 truck stop facilities across Canada
- Wilson Fuel – mainly in Atlantic Canada with 9 as Wilson Gas Stops and 23 as Esso

==== Former ====
- Gulf Canada - retail operations sold to Petro-Canada in 1986
- Husky – retail operations sold to Parkland Corporation and Federated Co-operatives in 2021
- Mohawk Oil – acquired by Husky in 1998
- Sunoco – owned by Suncor Energy; operated 200 stations in Ontario, since 2009 converted to Petro-Canada
- Supertest Petroleum – later acquired by BP
- Texaco Canada – acquired by Ultramar in 1989

=== Mexico ===
A list of gas station chains in Mexico:

- 76
- ARCO
- BP
- Costco brand gasoline
- Chevron
- G500 Network
- Gulf
- Mobil
- Oxxo Gas
- Pemex
- Phillips 66
- Petro7
- Repsol
- Shell
- Soriana brand gasoline
- Sunoco
- Total

== See also ==
- List of automotive fuel retailers
- List of historic filling stations
