= Loaf 'N Jug =

Chain of convenience stores owned by EG Group

- Company type: Private business
- Industry: Retail (Convenience stores)
- Founded: 1973 (53 years ago) in Fowler, Colorado
- Founder: Sam Sharp and Paul Jones
- Headquarters: Westborough, MA, United States
- Number of locations: 175 (2008)
- Area served: Colorado, Montana, Nebraska, New Mexico, North Dakota, South Dakota, Wyoming, Georgia, Arizona
- Products: Petroleum
- Parent: EG America
- Website: www.loafnjug.com

Loaf 'N Jug is a chain of convenience stores/gas stations, owned by EG America, headquartered in Westborough, MA. Kroger owned Loaf 'N Jug and its respective brands for over two decades before exiting the convenience store business and selling them to EG Group. Some Kroger supermarket locations, such as King Soopers and Smith's, have retained the Kroger convenience store signage that is still used at Loaf 'N Jug today.

== History ==
Loaf 'N Jug was founded by five businessmen from southern Colorado. Kroger purchased Loaf 'N Jug in 1986.

Mini Mart (not to be confused with the generalized term nor another EG America subsidiary, Minit Mart) was founded in Casper, WY in 1968 and was bought out by Loaf 'N Jug within two years of the Kroger buyout in 1986. This was about 12 years before relocating the Mini Mart headquarters from Casper to Pueblo in 1998. Starting in 2005, Loaf 'N Jug began converting all the Mini Marts to Loaf 'N Jugs.

In 2006, Kroger reimaged its convenience store brands (Loaf 'N Jug, Kwik Shop, Quik Stop, Tom Thumb, and Turkey Hill Minit Markets) under a common logo. At about the same time, Kroger debranded the gasoline sold at its convenience stores, eliminating Conoco which had been sold at many Loaf 'N Jug locations.

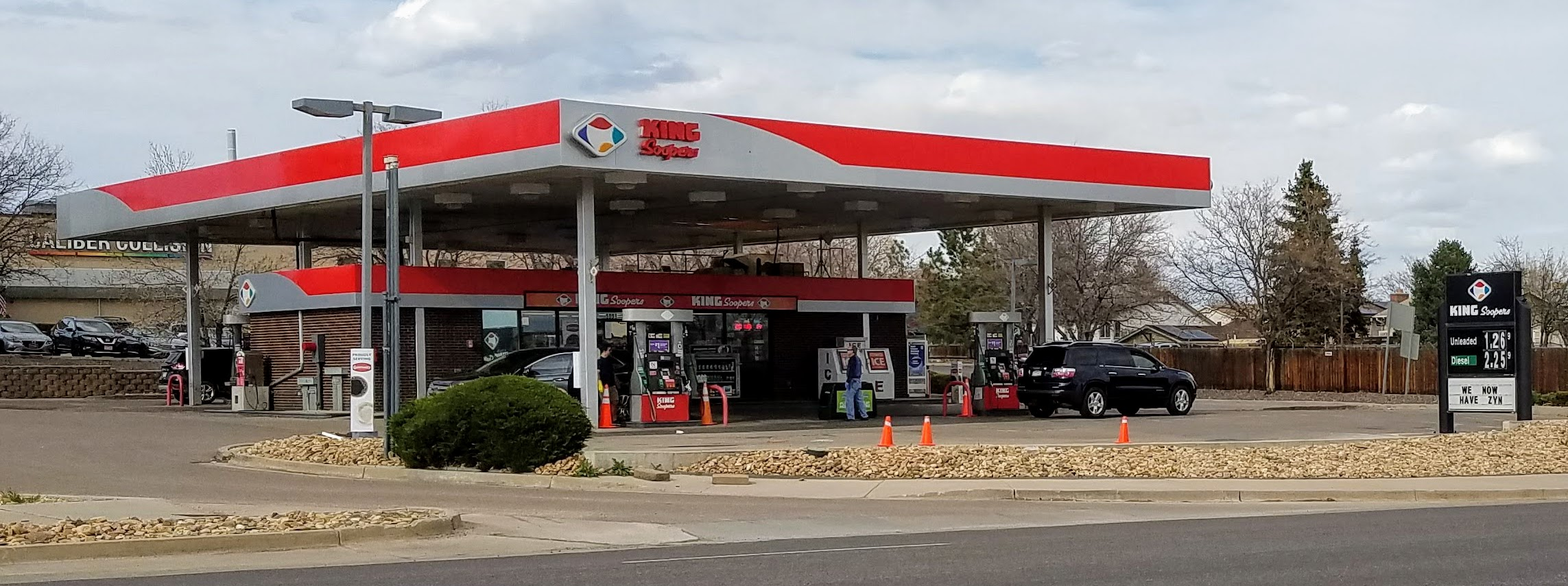
A Loaf 'N Jug that still displays King Soopers signage in 2020

As of 2008, there were 175 Loaf 'N Jug stores, primarily in Colorado and Wyoming with additional stores in Montana, Nebraska, New Mexico, North Dakota, Oklahoma, and South Dakota. Loaf 'N Jug has since exited Oklahoma.

On February 5, 2018, Kroger announced it was exiting the convenience store business and selling them to EG Group of the United Kingdom for $2.15 billion. The deal closed April 20, 2018. The individual store banners, such as Loaf 'N Jug, retained their imagery and branding. The EG America headquarters was initially established in Cincinnati but was moved to Westborough, MA following the acquisition of Cumberland Farms.

In November 2020, EG Group entered into a binding agreement for the acquisition of 18 locations of Schrader Oil in Fort Collins, Colorado. These locations were re-branded to Loaf 'N Jug following the acquisition.

In 2026, EG Group began a campaign to retire the Loaf 'N Jug name in Colorado and re-brand all locations in the state to Cumberland Farms, beginning with the chain's first location in Fowler. Cumberland Farms locations in Colorado will have Shell fueling stations.

== Gallery ==
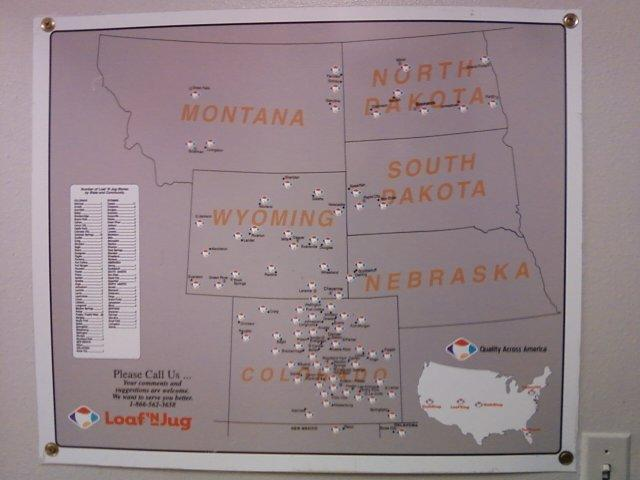
Map of Loaf 'N Jug locations at a store in Casper, Wyoming

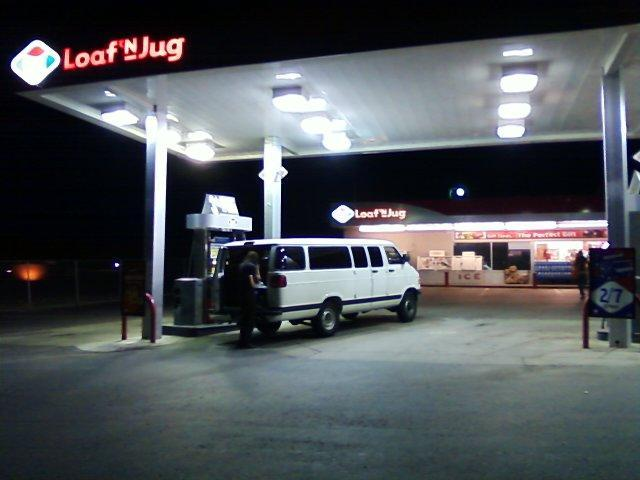
Loaf 'N Jug in north Casper, Wyoming, at Interstate 25 exit 191.

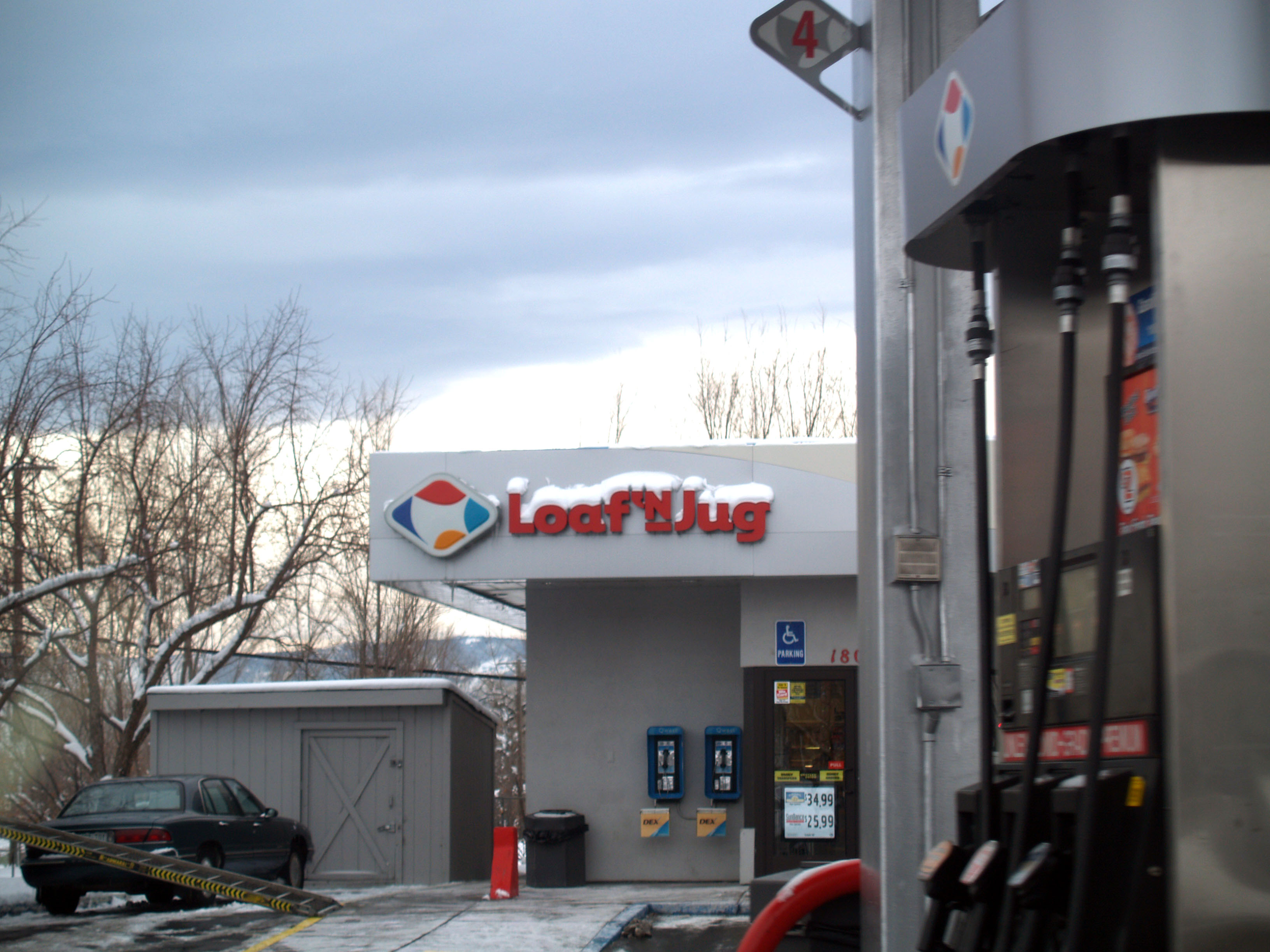
Loaf 'N Jug in Fort Collins, Colorado

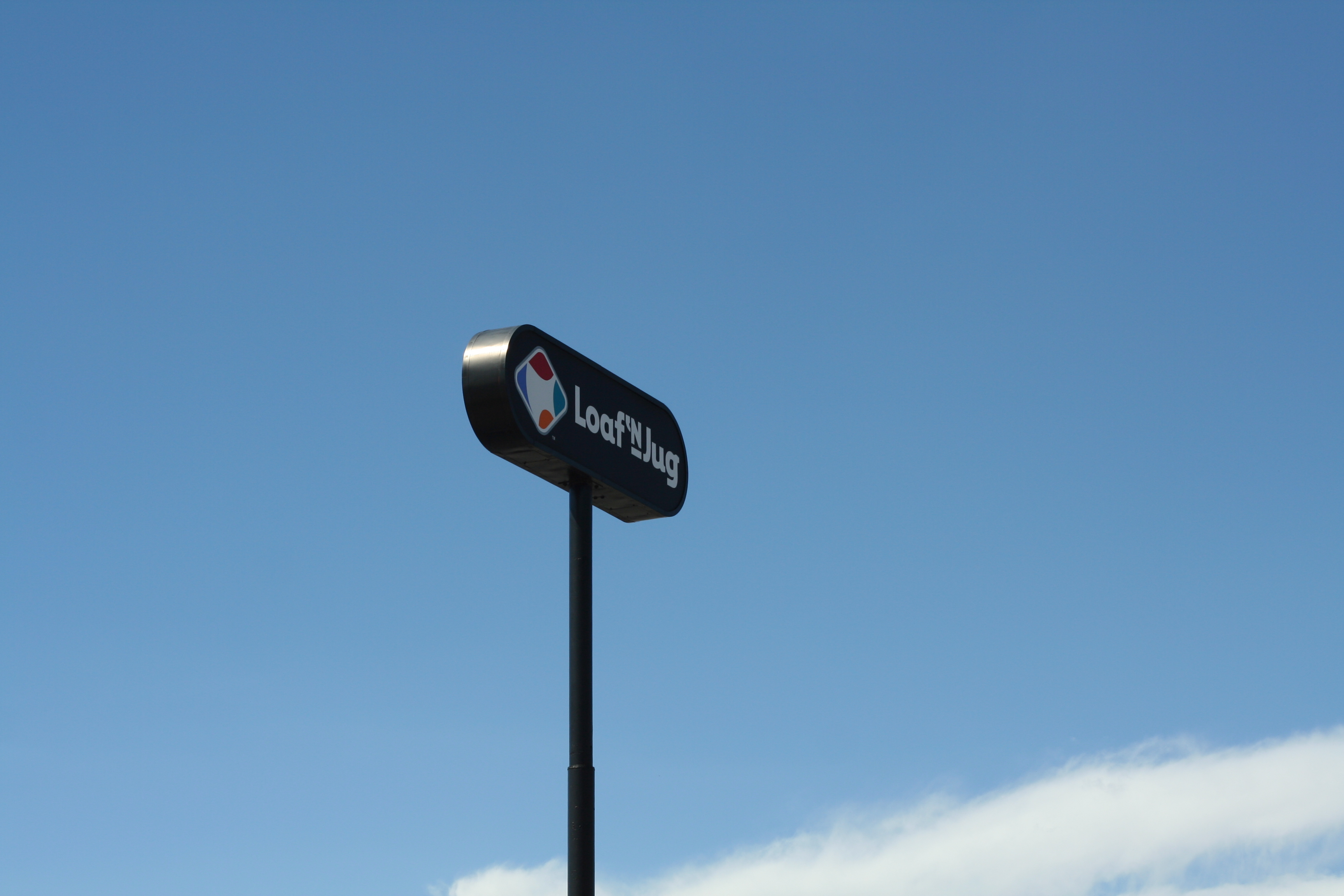
A Loaf 'N Jug sign at a station in Loaf 'N Jug's birth city, Pueblo.
