= Royal Farms =

American chain of convenience stores

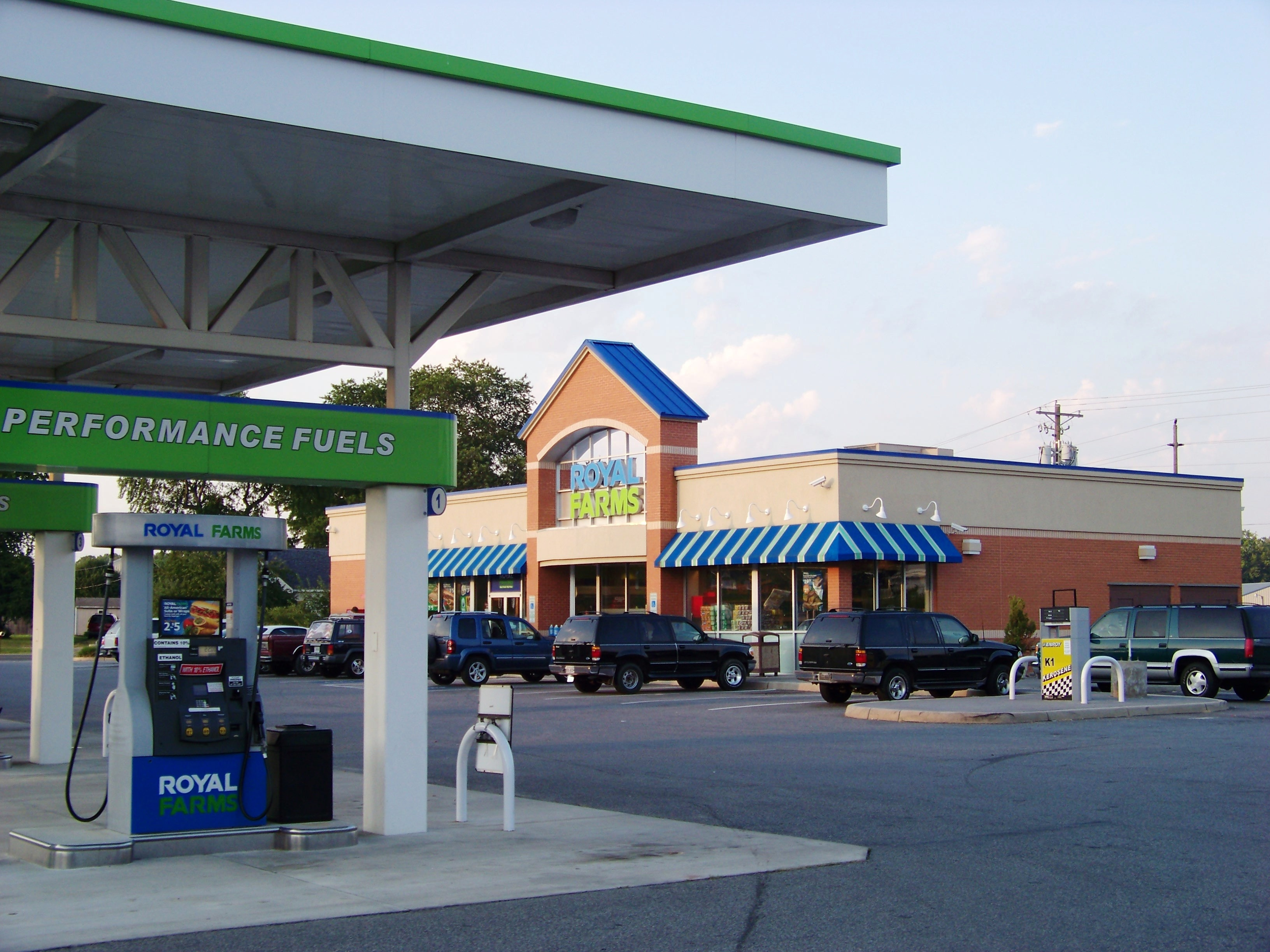
- A Royal Farms store in Hadlock, Virginia
- Formerly: White Jug (1959–1968)
- Type: Private
- Industry: Convenience store
- Founded: 1959; 67 years ago in Baltimore, Maryland, United States
- Headquarters: Baltimore, Maryland, United States
- Number of locations: 263 (2023)
- Area served: Maryland, Delaware, Pennsylvania, New Jersey, Virginia, West Virginia, North Carolina, New York
- Key people: John Kemp (CEO); Joshua Wolfe (CFO); Brian Roche (CPO)
- Products: Fried Chicken, Western Fries, Sandwiches, Burgers, Hot Dogs
- Revenue: ▲US$974.7 million (2022)
- Owner: Cloverland Farms Dairy
- Number of employees: 1,300 (2022)
- Website: royalfarms.com

Royal Farms is a privately owned chain of convenience stores headquartered in Baltimore, Maryland. The company operates more than 200 stores throughout Maryland, Delaware, Pennsylvania, New Jersey, Virginia, West Virginia, and North Carolina. Many of the stores also have gasoline and electric vehicle charging sold on the premises, as well as house-made fried chicken, chicken sandwiches, and fries.

== History ==
In 1959, Cloverland Farms Dairy opened its first store in Baltimore, under the name White Jug, which remains where the company's headquarters are based. In 1968, Cloverland Farms Dairy merged with Royal Dunloggin Dairy and the name was changed to Royal Farms.

In September 2014, Royal Farms purchased naming rights to the Baltimore Arena. On November 22, 2022, Royal Farms announced that it would open up its first North Carolina location in early 2023, with more locations coming soon to that state.

== Format ==
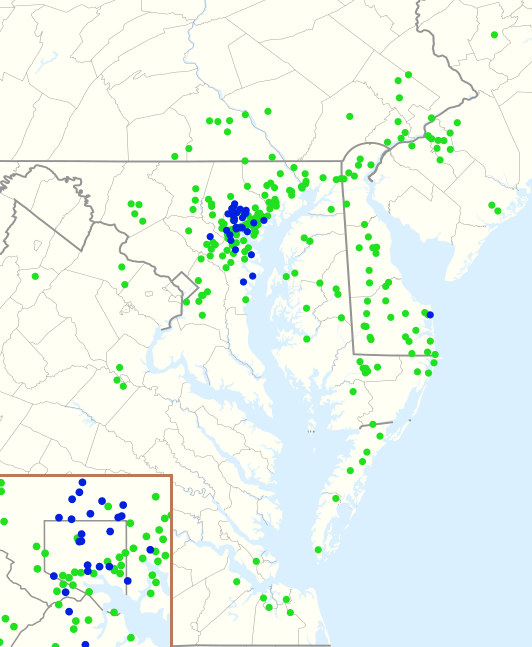
Royal Farms locations map as of January 2021. (Baltimore Metro expanded in inset)

As of September 2024, Royal Farms has 263 locations throughout the Mid-Atlantic as well as North Carolina. More than half are in the home state of Maryland. The chain sells typical convenience-store items, such as coffee, candy, soft drinks, bagels and donuts, lottery tickets, and other basic groceries. All locations offer a kitchen serving hot food items, particularly featuring fried chicken. Royal Farms' major competitors include Wawa, Sheetz, 7-Eleven, Rutter's, High's and Turkey Hill Minit Markets.
