= Petrowski =

Petrowski is a surname. Notable people with the surname include:

- Jamie Petrowski (born 1982), American football player
- Jerry Petrowski (born 1950), American politician
- Joseph Petrowski, American businessman
- Nathalie Petrowski (born 1954), French-born Canadian journalist and writer
