= Minit (disambiguation) =

- Minit is a 2018 adventure video game.

Minit may also refer to:

- Minit Mart, American chain of convenience stores
- Minit Records, American record label
