= Joseph Petrowski =

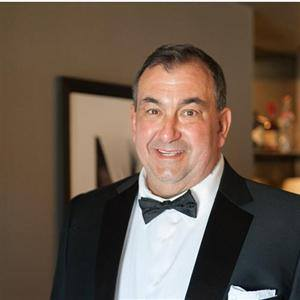
- Petrowski in November 2013
- Born: April 5, 1954; Brockton, Massachusetts, U.S.
- Died: November 19, 2023 (aged 69); West Yarmouth, Massachusetts, U.S.
- Education: Harvard University
- Occupations: Founder and Managing Partner of Mercantor Partners
- Board member of: South Jersey Industries, Society of Independent Gasoline Marketers, Claremont McKenna College, Boston College High School, Trinity Catholic

Joseph Petrowski (April 5, 1954 – November 19, 2023) was an American businessman who was the founder and managing partner of Mercantor Partners, an investment firm and management team working with Arclight Capital of Boston to undertake investments in downstream energy and retail convenience stores.

Petrowski was a member of the board of South Jersey Industries (NYSE ticker symbol: SJI), a publicly traded natural gas utility and national energy merchant. Petrowski also was a board member for the Society of Independent Gasoline Marketers, Claremont McKenna College, Boston College High School, and Trinity Catholic.

Petrowski also sat on the advisory council of the Boston Federal Reserve.

== Early life and education ==
He graduated cum laude from Harvard College in 1976.

== Career ==
Prior to forming Mercantor Partners, Petrowski was chief executive officer (CEO) for Gulf Oil L.P. and Cumberland Farms, Inc. from 2005 through 2013. During his time as CEO, the company achieved record earnings and increased the Cumberland Farms retail store count to 700 and Gulf branded locations to 3,500. When Petrowski left The Cumberland Gulf Group, the company was ranked by Forbes magazine as the 13th largest privately held company in the US with $15 billion in annual revenue and over 7,000 employees.

In 2016, Petrowski joined Yesway (previously BW Gas & Convenience Stores LLC) as a senior advisor to chairman and chief executive officer.

== Death ==
Petrowski died at age 69 on November 19, 2023, at his home in West Yarmouth, Massachusetts. He is buried at Woodside Cemetery in Yarmouth Port, Massachusetts.
