= EG Group =

British-founded multinational convenience retail group

EG Group Limited
- Formerly: Euro Garages (2001–2016); Intervias Group (2016–2018)
- Type: Private
- Industry: Convenience store retail and fuel retailing
- Founded: 2001; 25 years ago
- Founder: Mohsin Issa; Zuber Issa
- Headquarters: Bolton, Greater Manchester, United Kingdom; Charlotte, United States
- Area served: Benelux; Germany; United Kingdom; United States; Former locations: Australia; France; Ireland; Italy
- Key people: Roland Smith (chairman); Russell Colaco (CEO)
- Brands: Certified Oil (USA); Cumberland Farms (USA); EVPoint (UK); Fastrac (USA); Go Fresh Bakery (Netherlands/Belgium); Kwik Shop (USA); Loaf 'N Jug (USA); Maxi Autohof (Germany); Minit Mart (USA); QuikStop (USA); Sprint (USA); Tom Thumb (USA); Turkey Hill (USA)
- Owner: TDR Capital (50%); Mohsin Issa (25%); Zuber Issa (25%)
- Website: Official website

EG Group Limited (undergoing rebranding to Cumberland Farms Group) is an American-British multinational operator of filling stations, convenience stores and fast-food service providers across the United States, United Kingdom, Germany, and Benelux.

Founded in 2001 by Mohsin and Zuber Issa as Euro Garages, the company began with a single petrol station in Bury, Greater Manchester, before expanding rapidly across the United Kingdom through the acquisition of forecourts from oil companies and improving their retail and food offerings.

In October 2015, TDR Capital acquired a minority stake in Euro Garages, and in October 2016 its European Forecourt Retail Group, operating in France and Benelux, merged with the business to create Intervias Group, later renamed EG Group.

The company grew internationally through debt-funded expansion, reaching almost £8 billion in debt by 2023, having acquired businesses in Germany, Italy, Australia, the United States, and Ireland by 2020. From 2023, the French, Italian, Australian and Irish businesses were divested, whilst most British assets were sold to Asda and EG On The Move.

== History ==
=== Growth and national expansion (2001–2015) ===
In March 2001, brothers Mohsin and Zuber Issa purchased a BP forecourt in Bury, Greater Manchester for £150,000. Later in the same year, the brothers would acquire additional forecourts.

In October 2006, the group began rolling out Subway concessions at its forecourts.

By July 2007, the group had formed partnerships with Shell and Texaco, as well as Spar and Costcutter for grocery and merchandising.

By February 2009, Euro Garages had 73 forecourts across North England and the Midlands.

In July 2009, Euro Garages acquired its first motorway service area, Rivington services, and invested £12.5 million in refurbishing it. In the same month, the group partnered with JJ Beano's to deploy Coffee Nation dispensers to its sites.

In January 2010, the group began franchising Starbucks locations, and in November of that year began a franchise agreement with Burger King.

In February 2013, Euro Garages acquired 45 Esso petrol stations in North England and Wales from ExxonMobil, who were offloading their forecourt sites to focus on their core production and refining business. In the same month, the group acquired a number of vacant Little Chef premises, to transform into Starbucks franchises.

In July 2013, the group entered into a trial agreement with Greggs, who wanted to enter the food-to-go sector.

In January 2014, Euro Garages acquired another 48 Esso forecourts in the Midlands, nearly doubling Euro Garages' reach to 180 sites across the UK. In April 2015, the group acquired another 104 Esso forecourts. In October 2015, the group purchased 68 forecourts from Shell.

=== TDR Capital and international expansion (2015–2023) ===
In October 2015, TDR Capital purchased a minority stake in Euro Garages. In the same month, the group announced a partnership with Mother Hubbard's Fish and Chips, opening a location on Preston New Road, Blackburn.

In February 2016, Euro Garages formed a franchise partnership with KFC.

In October 2016, Euro Garages merged with TDR Capital's European Forecourt Retail group (EFR), to create Intervias Group, a new group comprising 1,450 locations, with a presence in the UK, France, the Netherlands, Belgium and Luxembourg.

In January 2017, Intervias Group began a trial to roll-out Sainsbury's Local to forecourts in the UK, though these were unsuccessful and were changed to Spar. The group would later collaborate with Sainsbury's again to create Sainsbury's on the Go, though this concept was discontinued later on as well.

In February 2017, Intervias Group purchased 78 UK properties from Kout Food Group, this including all 70 Little Chef sites (some with attached Burger King and Subway franchises) and eight standalone Burger King sites for £16 million. The group would then transform the Little Chef sites into franchise partners by October 2018. The group founded EG Diner as a stopgap in January 2018, when its licence to use the Little Chef name expired, ending the Little Chef brand after almost 60 years.

In August 2017, EG Group opened its first hotel site, a former Travelodge hotel site in Monmouth, Wales, reopening it as Raglan Lodge. Another former Travelodge hotel site location at Rivington Services was acquired and reopened as Rivington Lodge.

In November 2017, the business secured approximately 1,000 petrol stations from Esso in Germany, which would be transferred and integrated into the existing network by October 2018.

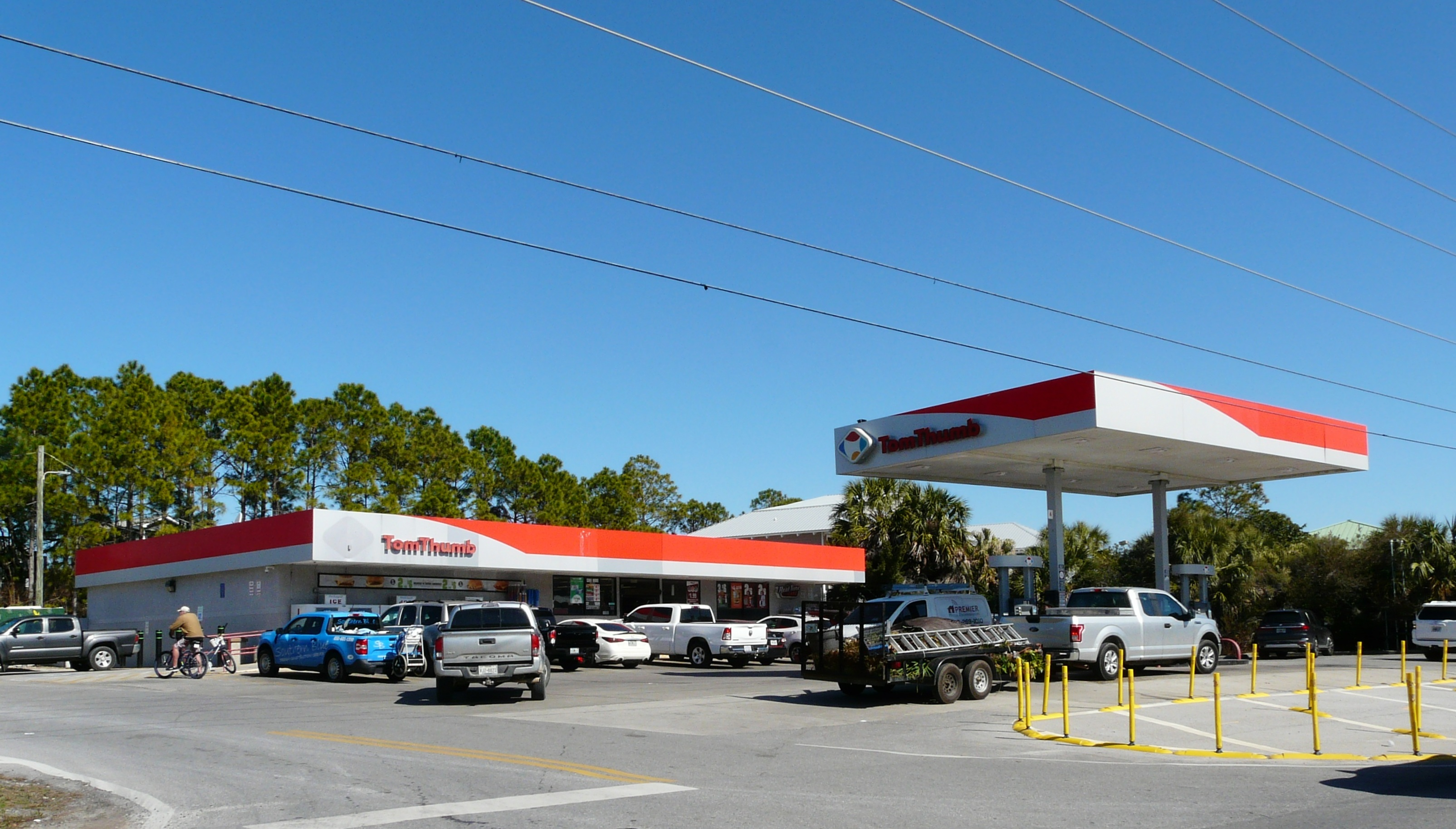
Tom Thumb store in Seagrove Beach, Florida

In December 2017, Intervias Group announced a partnership with Krispy Kreme in the UK.

In January 2018, Intervias Group announced that it had completed the acquisition of circa 1,200 sites in Italy from Esso. In April 2018, Intervias Group completed the acquisition of a portfolio of 97 sites in the Netherlands to supplement is existing network in the country.

On 5 February 2018, Intervias Group announced that it would purchase nearly eight hundred Kroger convenience stores for $2.15 billion. In December 2018, EG Group completed its acquisition of 225 sites of Minit Mart from Travel Centers of America LLC for upwards of US$330m.

On 9 November 2018, Australian retailer Woolworths announced to the Australian Securities Exchange it had entered into a binding agreement to sell its 540 fuel convenience sites to EG Group for A$1.72bn. This created EG Australia.

In July 2019, EG Group completed its acquisition of fifty four Fastrac branded sites in the United States, and announced a deal to acquire sixty nine sites operated by Certified Oil, also in the United States. On 31 July 2019, EG Group announced having entered a binding agreement to purchase Cumberland Farms. EG America has become the nation's fourth largest convenience store chain following 7-Eleven's purchase of Speedway, and with Circle K and Casey's occupying the other spots ahead of EG America. Some EG America locations have begun offering franchised food concepts at their locations, such as Subway, Burger King, Sbarro, and Hunt Brothers Pizza, to compete better with chains that have long-established in-house food products.

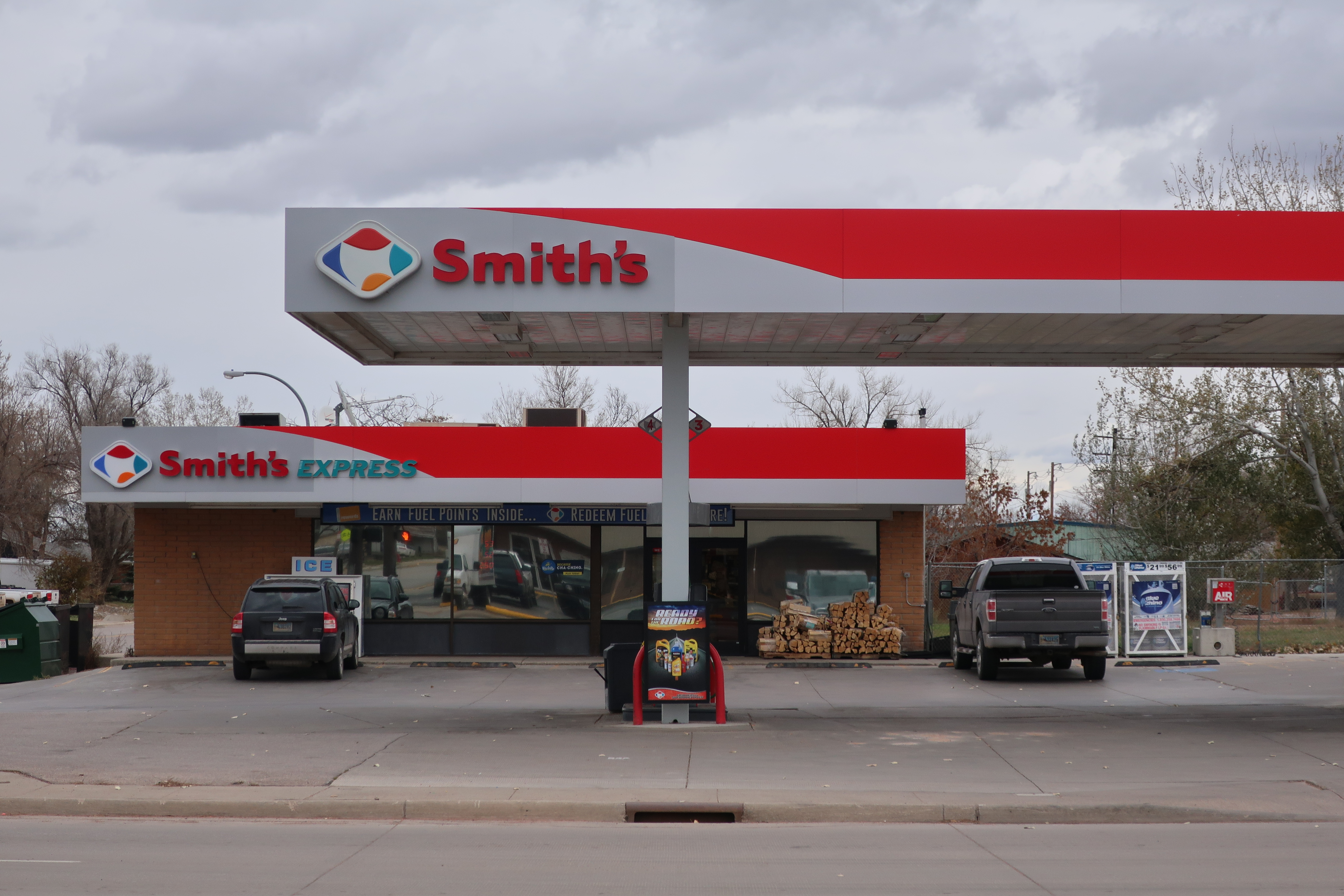
Former Loaf 'N Jug now a Kroger's Smith's Express in Gillette, Wyoming

In early 2020, EG Group announced that they were opening 150 UK bakery outlets under a partnership with Cinnabon by 2025.

In March 2020, EG Group acquired 145 KFC outlets in the UK and Ireland from The Herbert Group.

In October 2020, the Issa brothers and TDR Capital won a deal to buy the supermarket chain Asda from Walmart for £6.8 billion, bringing it back into British hands after more than 20 years. Questions were raised after its auditor, Deloitte, "suddenly quit" to be replaced by KPMG. However, the group indicated there were no auditing disagreements. This acquisition would mean EG Group would work with Asda to create 'Asda on the Move' and 'Asda Express', transforming a number of its existing Spar sites.

In November 2020, EG Group entered into a binding agreement for the acquisition of 18 locations of Schrader Oil in Fort Collins, Colorado.

In May 2021, EG Group bought Leon Restaurants in the UK for a reported £100 million.

In September 2021, EG Group acquired 52 British KFC restaurants from Amsric Group, becoming the largest KFC franchisee in western Europe.

In October 2021, EG Group bought Cooplands, the UK's second-largest bakery operating mainly in North East England and Yorkshire. Also in October 2021, the group announced it would sell 27 sites to Park Garage Group to satisfy the Competition and Markets Authority after buying Asda.

In April 2022, The Wall Street Journal reported that Circle K parent Alimentation Couche-Tard was in talks to buy EG Group. This deal would significantly boost Circle K's presence in several markets including Europe, as well as giving it a location in every US state except Utah.

In May 2022, EG Group attempted to rescue the British convenience store chain McColl's from administration, but lost out to Morrisons.

Later in the same month, the group bought 285 petrol stations in Southern Germany from OMV, which were partly supplied by refinery Burghausen. The price was 485 million Euro cash which equals 614 million Euro including pending lease obligations.

=== Restructure plan (2023–present) ===
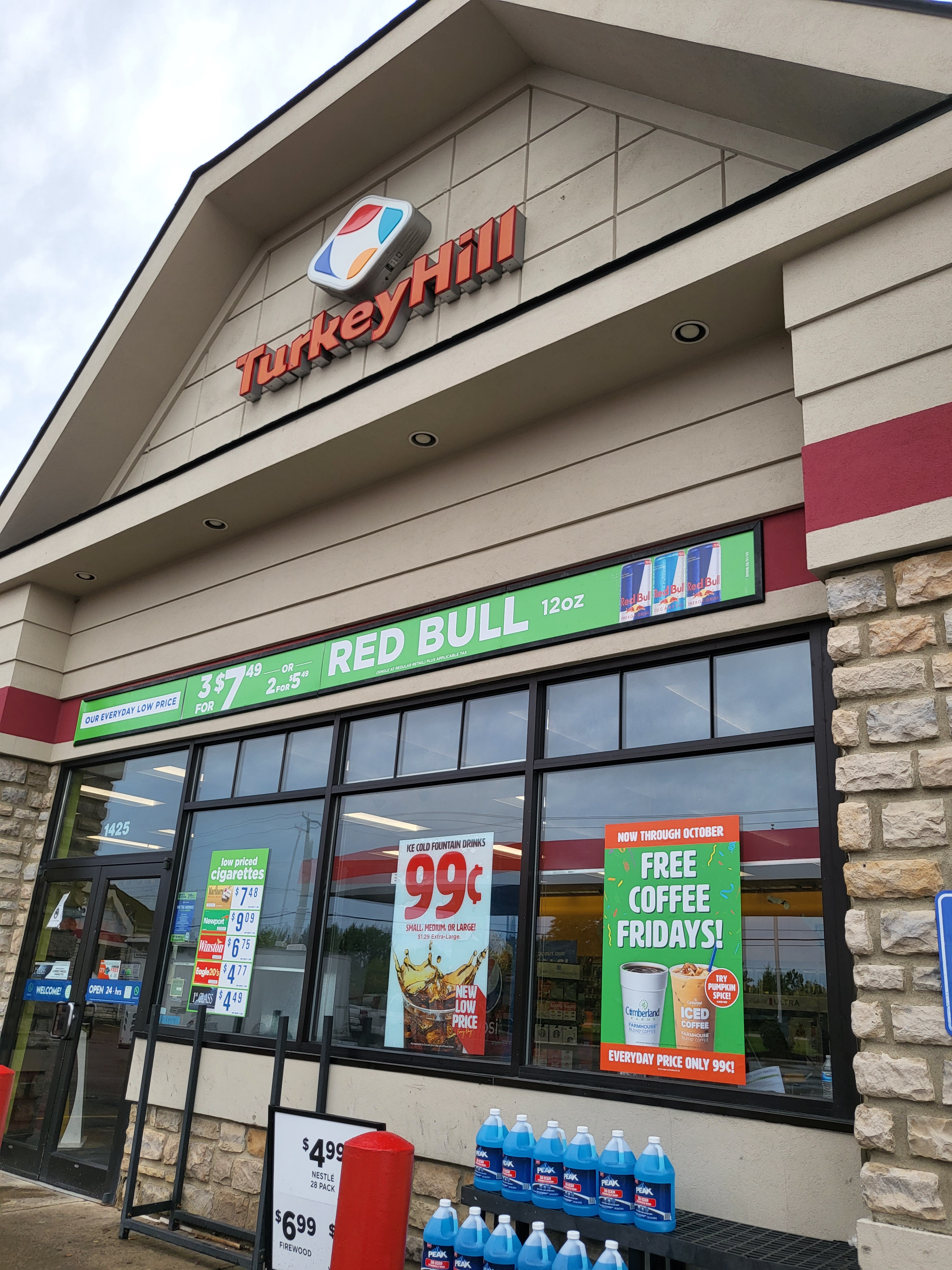
A Turkey Hill Minit Markets location in Columbus, Ohio offering Cumberland Farms branded coffee in 2021

In March 2023, EG sold and leased back 415 of its American convenience stores to Realty Income for $1.5 billion (£1.18 billion) to help to drive down its debts.

In May 2023, it was announced that EG Group would spin off the majority of the UK business to Asda: it would include the majority of the petrol stations, which would be rebranded under the Asda Express sub-brand, Greggs, Subway and Burger King franchises and the Leon Restaurants chain. The deal was finalised on 31 October 2023.

On 6 December 2023, EG Group announced that they would sell their 218 KFC UK and Ireland restaurants to KFC owner Yum! Brands for an undisclosed sum, meaning EG Group will leave the Irish market. The sale was completed in April 2024.

In March 2024, it emerged that Zuber Issa would acquire most of EG Group's remaining UK assets, and then operate them as EG On The Move (a separate company to EG Group). These assets were confirmed to include the rest of the UK petrol forecourts and the UK Cinnabon franchise, with EG Group left with its only UK assets being Cooplands, some Starbucks franchises, and Evpoint.

In December 2024, it was reported that Mohsin and Zuber were looking to float EG Group publicly at a valuation of £13 billion in the United States.

On August 10, 2025, Zuber told reporters that the option for EG Group to sell off its US business should be explored, in addition to the option of floating the entire company publicly. Zuber also expressed dissatisfaction in the private-equity model, and mentioned that he and Mohsin have learned a lot since they formed the business.

On August 12, 2025, EG Group announced it would sell off its Italian division to a consortium to help repay its debts. The company also announced it would sell off its Australian business to Ampol in August 2025, with the sale expected to be finalised in mid-2026. The sale was completed in June 2026.

On August 22, 2025, EG Group announced that they would be moving their headquarters from Blackburn to Charlotte, North Carolina and moving their UK offices to Bolton. This was completed in 9 March 2026.

In October 2025, it was announced that EG Group had divested of Cooplands, making their only UK assets Starbucks franchises and EVPoint. Also in October, EG Group in the UK were fined for underpaying 3,317 workers by £824,000 between 2015 and 2019. The group reported that the issue had been fully rectified and all staff had since been paid.

In January 2026, chairman Lord Stuart Rose stepped down and was replaced by Roland Smith, chairman of American fast food chain Jack's.

In February 2026, it was confirmed that EG Group would sell its French operations, involving 260 forecourts, to EG On The Move.

In June 2026, EG Group confidentially filed for a US public offering that could raise about $1 billion and value the company around $9 billion.

In July 2026, its sale of its French assets to EG On The Move was completed.

== See also ==
- EG On The Move
