= Cooplands =

UK bakery chain

Coopland & Son (Scarborough) Limited
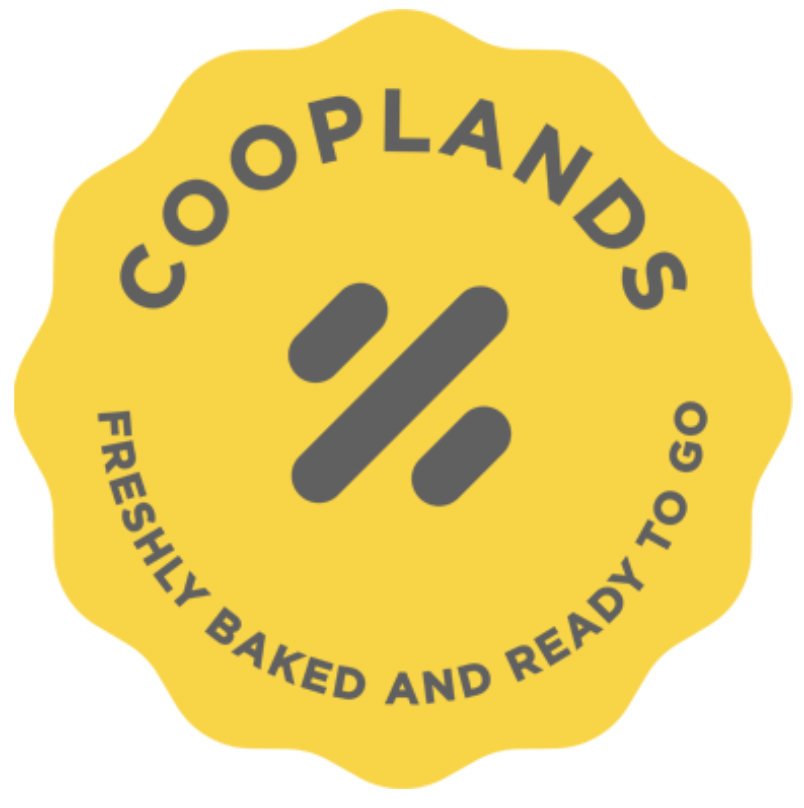
- Company type: Private
- Industry: Food (bakery)
- Founded: 1885
- Headquarters: Eastfield, England
- Number of locations: 150+
- Key people: John Ruddock (CEO)
- Products: Sandwiches, pasties, pastries, cakes, bread
- Owner: Independent
- Website: cooplands-bakery.co.uk

Coopland & Son (Scarborough) Limited (trading as Cooplands) is an English bakery chain founded in 1885. The chain predominantly operate takeaway outlets across Yorkshire, Lincolnshire, Nottinghamshire and County Durham.

== History ==
Cooplands was founded as a single shop in Scarborough, North Yorkshire in 1885, and was incorporated in 1949.

In 1999, the company opened ten new stores, and expanded production at its Scarborough-based bakery with the creation of 80 new jobs. A further expansion was announced in June 2007 when it acquired the Hull-based bakery, Skeltons, adding 34 locations to its portfolio.

In 2005, Cooplands was noted as being an "established NVQ training centre", and received a National Training Award for staff training. The same year it held a "Careers in the Bakery Industry" event, with career advisors discussing employment opportunities.

In April 2011, Woodhead Bakery, a rival Scarborough-based chain, fell into administration. Of the 29 Woodhead outlets, Cooplands bought 18, and the rest were purchased by the Haldane Retail Group.

In December 2017, Cooplands received £8.5 million investment from BGF to accelerate the rollout of its shops across the North of England.

In October 2021, Cooplands was bought by the EG Group. In partnership with supermarket chain Asda, Cooplands have opened concessions at select Asda On the Move branches in Retford, Pulborough and Hull.

In October 2025, EG Group divested Cooplands to an independent management team, with David Salkeld and Paul Coopland returning to the business.
