= Turkey Hill Minit Markets =

American convenience store chain

- Type: Private business
- Industry: Retail (Convenience stores)
- Founded: 1967 (59 years ago) in Lancaster, PA
- Founder: Charles and Emerson Frey
- Headquarters: Westborough, MA, U.S.
- Number of locations: 267
- Area served: Ohio, Pennsylvania
- Products: Petroleum
- Parent: EG America
- Website: www.turkeyhillcstores.com

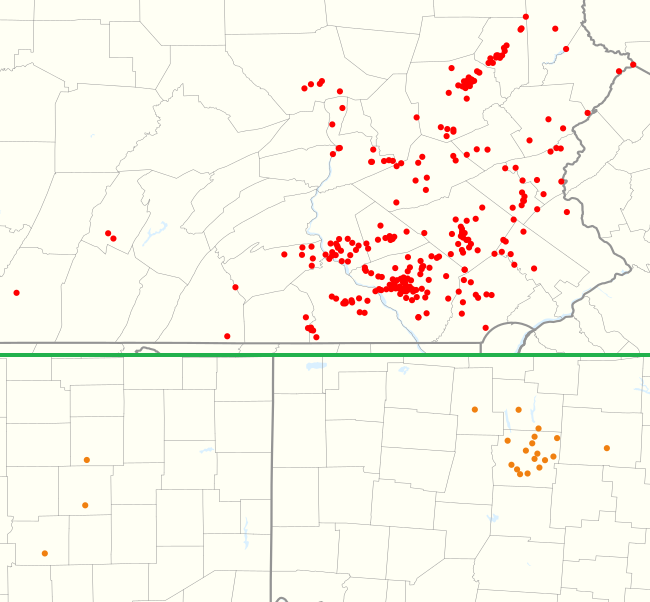
Map of Turkey Hill Minit Market locations. red = Pennsylvania stores orange = "Midwest Division" stores (Indiana & Ohio)

Turkey Hill Minit Markets is an American chain of convenience stores founded in Lancaster, Pennsylvania in 1967. As of October 2017, Turkey Hill Minit Markets had over 260 locations across Ohio, Indiana, and Pennsylvania. Turkey Hill Minit Markets is owned by EG Group and operated independently from Turkey Hill, a separate Peak Rock Capital-owned brand of iced tea, ice cream and other beverages and frozen desserts.

== History ==
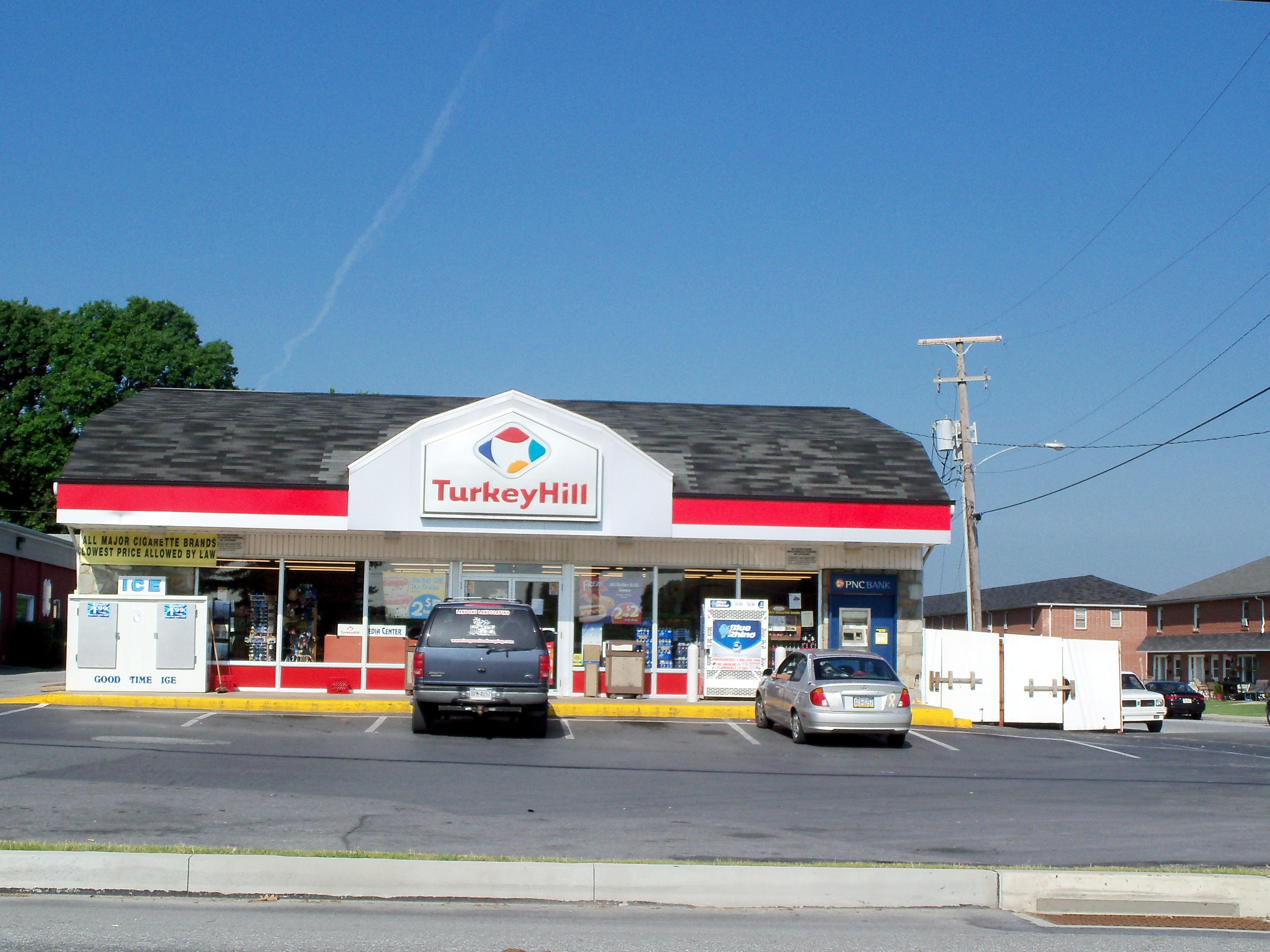
Turkey Hill convenience store in Strasburg, Pennsylvania

In 1967, Charles and Emerson Frey opened the first Turkey Hill Minit Market store on Columbia Avenue in Lancaster, Pennsylvania, as a way to better market their dairy products.

The stores operated as a separate business - Farmland Industries - with the headquarters in the original store basement. In 1978, they built their second headquarters at 257 Centerville Road in East Hempfield Township, Lancaster County, Pennsylvania. This building was demolished and rebuilt as a new location. It opened in March 2023.

On December 19, 1974, the stores won a legal battle overturning the so-called blue laws that prohibited retailers opening on Sunday, and in 1976, they became the first company to offer self-service gasoline in Pennsylvania.

In 1979, Turkey Hill Minit Market purchased 36 Louden Hill stores. In July 1985, Turkey Hill acquired a number of 7-Eleven stores and six Ideal Markets. In Lancaster County, where the chain originated, Turkey Hill Minit Markets were the overwhelming convenience store choice; in some cases, stores were located as close as three blocks apart.

In 1985, Kroger acquired both Turkey Hill Minit Markets and Turkey Hill Dairy, which manufactures various beverages, fruit-flavored drinks and dairy products, including milk and ice cream. Kroger continued to operate both brands as separate, independent entities.

During the 1990s, Turkey Hill and competitors Sheetz and Wawa began overlapping their regions of service. John Hofmeister, president of Shell Oil commented on the new situation in sworn testimony before the U.S. Senate Committee on the Judiciary in March 2006: "We are seeing healthy new retail competition emerging with brands such as Wawa, Sheetz, and Turkey Hill."

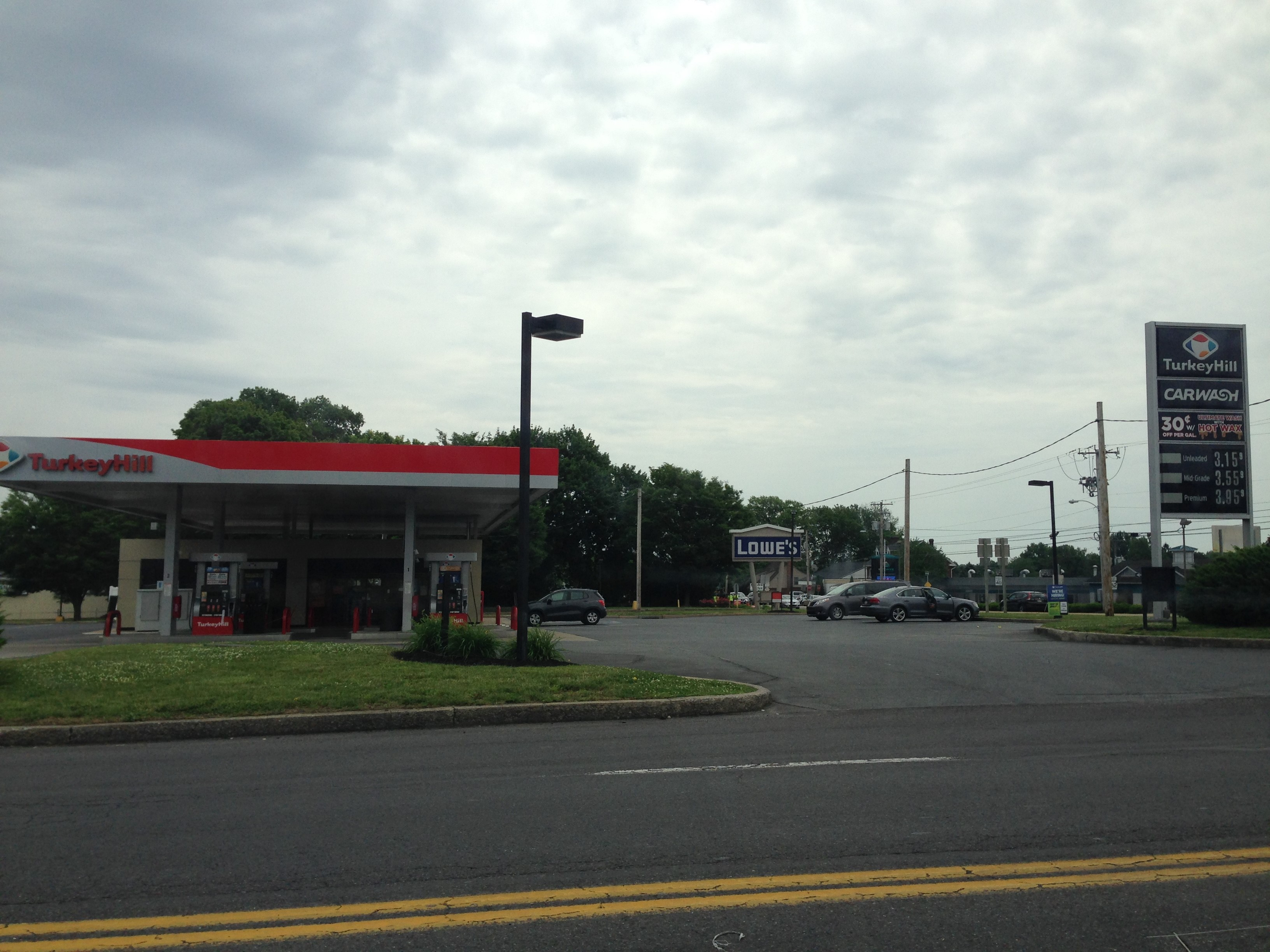
A Turkey Hill store at the intersection of Columbia Ave and Rohrerstown Rd in Lancaster, Pennsylvania. This location was formerly an Exxon.

In 1998, Turkey Hill opened its 249th store in Hazleton, Pennsylvania. This store was the first of many stores to open with foodservice offerings. Foodservice offerings included fresh subs, sandwiches, pizza, and many other hot foods. Many new stores are built with foodservice and car washes. Beginning in 1999, new larger stores were opened with more of an emphasis on selling gasoline. About 200 of the 240 stores in Central Pennsylvania have gas pumps.

In October 2017, Kroger disclosed that it was considering the potential sale of Turkey Hill Minit Markets as well as four other convenience store brands - Kwik Shop, Loaf 'N Jug, Quik Stop, and Tom Thumb. Any potential sale would exclude Turkey Hill Dairy, which is operated separately from the convenience store chain.

In early February 2018, Kroger announced it had reached an agreement to sell Turkey Hill Minit Markets and its entire convenience-store portfolio to EG Group, forming the basis of EG America. The sale was finalized on April 20, 2018. The following year, EG America purchased Columbus, Ohio-based Certified Oil, leading to Turkey Hill's Columbus area locations to be marketed together with Certified. EG America's purchase of Cumberland Farms shortly afterwards allowed Turkey Hill and all of EG America to sell Cumberland Farms-branded coffee products.

On January 27, 2020, Burger King opened a location inside a Turkey Hill store in Cumru Township, Pennsylvania. This marks the beginning of a plan by EG Group to add fast food franchises at several Turkey Hill locations in order to update food service offerings, including Sbarro at its Midwestern locations.

=== Branding changes ===
In 2004, the stores adopted the current signage, featuring a stylized map of the contiguous United States. EG America's Kwik Shop, Loaf 'N Jug, Quik Stop, and Tom Thumb brands all use the same logo and font, which originated with Kroger.
