= Hadlock, Virginia =

Community in Northampton County, Virginia, US

- Unincorporated community
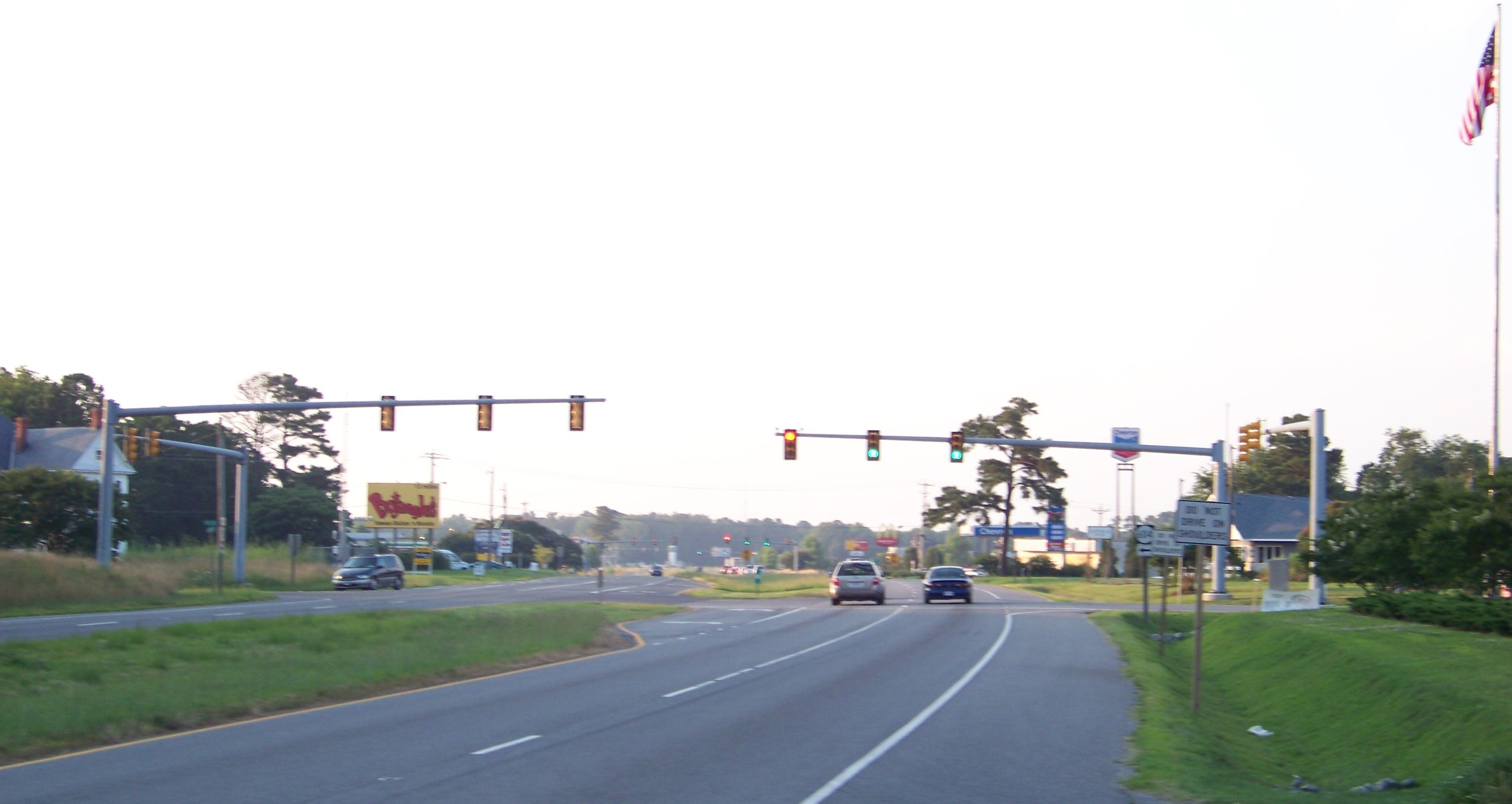
- Crossroads at Hadlock

- Location within Virginia Location within the United States
- Coordinates: 37°31′03″N 75°50′01″W
- Country: United States
- State: Virginia
- County: Northampton
- Town: Exmore
- Time zone: UTC−5 (Eastern (EST))
  - Summer (DST): UTC−4 (EDT)
- ZIP code: 23350
- Area codes: 757, 948
- GNIS feature ID: 1467632

Hadlock is an unincorporated community in Northampton County, Virginia, United States. It is located completely within the town of Exmore, on U.S. Route 13.
