= Gulf Oil LP =

Oil company

Gulf Oil International Ltd.
- Type: Private
- Industry: Petroleum industry
- Predecessor: Gulf Oil
- Founded: 1986; 40 years ago
- Headquarters: Wellesley, Massachusetts, U.S.
- Number of locations: 1,103 (2025)
- Area served: United States East Coast
- Key people: Mike Jones (CEO)
- Products: Fuels, Lubricants; Greases; Marine Lubricants
- Brands: Gulf
- Revenue: US$575.6 million (2022)
- Owner: Chevron Corporation (1985–2010); Cumberland Farms (2010–15); ArcLight Capital Partners (2015–23); RaceTrac (Note: Acquired rights to the "Gulf" brand in the U.S. only. Rights outside the U.S. are property of Hinduja Group.) (2023–present)
- Website: gulfoilltd.com

Gulf Oil International Ltd. is an American oil company formed when Chevron Corporation acquired the naming rights to the Gulf Oil brand in the United States for $13 billion in 1985.

By 2010, convenience store chain Cumberland Farms acquired all rights to the brand from Chevron, making it the sole owner and marketer in the country. Once based in Chelsea, Massachusetts, and Newton, Massachusetts, Gulf Oil LP then shared its headquarters with Cumberland Farms in Framingham, Massachusetts. In 2015, Cumberland sold the company to ArcLight Capital Partners and moved the company to its own office in Wellesley, Massachusetts, eventually selling to convenience store chain RaceTrac in 2023 and its headquarters being relocated to Smyrna, GA in the same building which houses RaceTrac and its other subsidiaries.

== History ==
Chevron acquired rights to the Gulf Oil brand in March 1985 for $12 billion. Through the merger, some 3,000 Gulf stations in Arkansas, Louisiana and Texas were rebranded "Chevron". By late 1985, the merger was complete. In November 1985, it was announced that Chevron had agreed to sell 4,000 fuel stations to convenience store chain operator Cumberland Farms, in order to reduce its debts taken from the acquisition of Gulf.

In 2010, Cumberland Farms purchased a license for North American rights to the Gulf brand from Chevron. Chevron still owned the Gulf brand, but made little use of it by 2006. Cumberland Farms then operated about 500 fuel stations and 20 refined petroleum terminals; it was licensed to use Gulf trademarks and names in 11 states. In 1993, Cumberland Farms entered a joint venture with Catamount Petroleum LP, forming Gulf Oil Limited Partnership with Cumberland owning a two-thirds interest. Cumberland since acquired the company in full. There were also some independently owned franchises operating under the Gulf brand in North America, including Nu-Tier Brands, In., which is licensed by Gulf Oil LP to blend and distribute Gulf-branded lubricants.

Gulf Oil has sponsored major sporting events in New York City, Boston, Manchester, Philadelphia, and Pittsburgh.

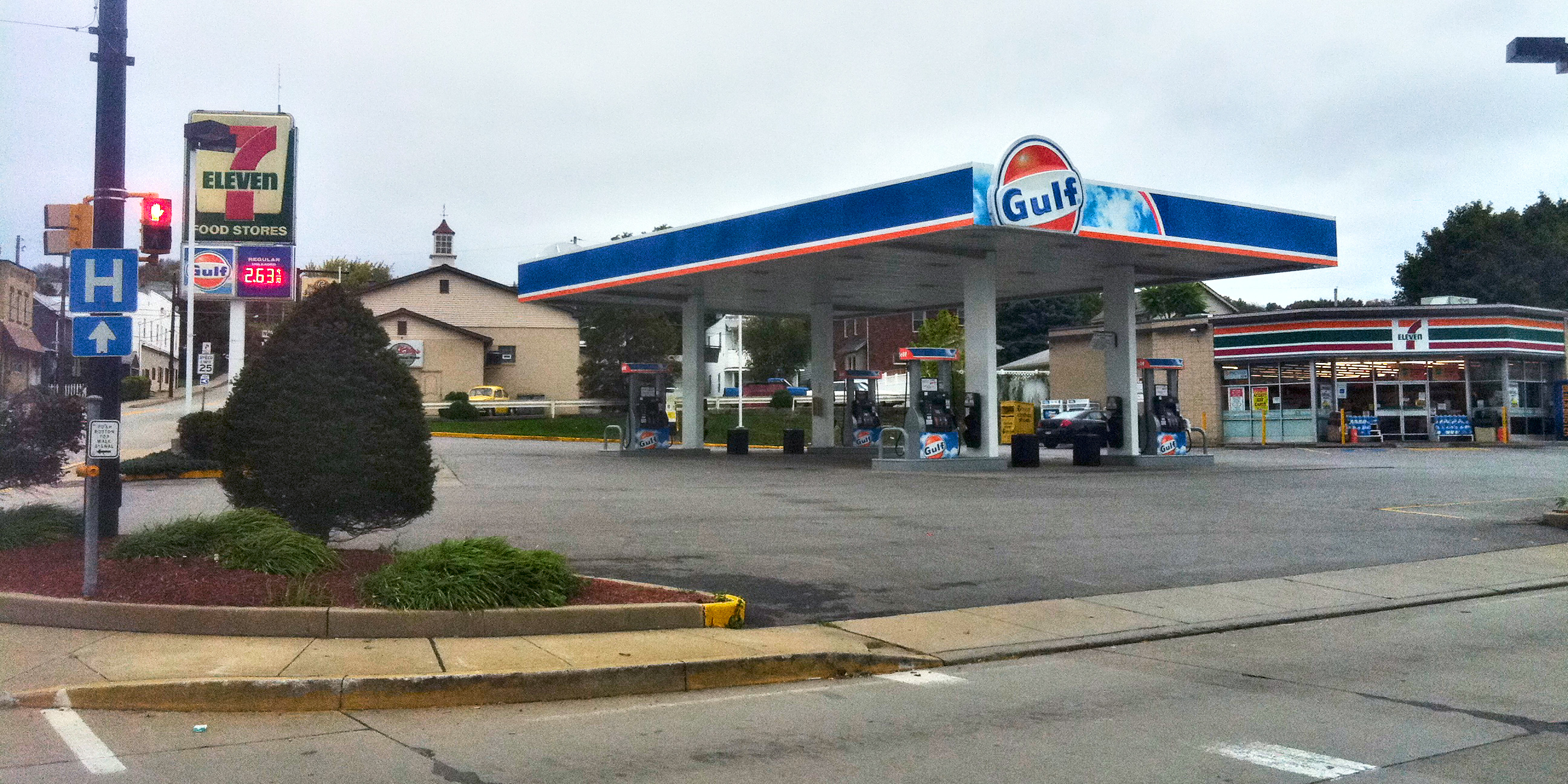
A Gulf station cobranded with 7-Eleven in Ellwood City, Pennsylvania, 2010. This store switched to Marathon for fuel sales while retaining 7-Eleven in 2021.

In June 2008, Gulf had 1800 stations in the northeastern US; Gulf Oil LP agreed to supply the approximately 600 Exxon stations in New England and New York in a deal with ConocoPhillips. The deal included Cumberland Farms buying 200 Exxon stations, but intended to keep the name. That month, The Boston Globe reported that Gulf Oil LP (which had purchased the delivery contracts for over 500 Exxon stations in 2003 after the ExxonMobil merger required divestment) wanted to buy Mobil-branded company-owned stations in the Northeast. ExxonMobil sold 820 owned-and-operated stations, plus about 1400 leased stations. Then, Gulf was the only large local brand in New England, where it had 2000 stations, supplying about 500 stations with other names, for a market share of 10 percent. The 2003 deal gave Gulf Oil exclusive rights to the Exxon name in New York and New England until February 2010, when "Exxon" would be dropped. However, in 2008 Gulf Oil decided to stop using the Exxon name in February 2009, asking independent stations to switch to Gulf. The Enterprise of Brockton, Massachusetts, reported in April 2008 that Verc Enterprises would change 14 Exxon stations in Massachusetts and New Hampshire to Gulf, but not its five Mobil's. The Massachusetts Turnpike Authority announced in summer 2007 a switch of eleven former Exxon stations on the Massachusetts Turnpike to Gulf, and in 2009 the same change was extended to 158 Cumberland Farms-owned stations, the Globe said. Gulf supplied 300 other Exxons, of which 200 would likely change to Gulf. Many of the former Exxon stations feature a rectangular logo that fit into the existing sign standards used by Exxon. Gulf refers to the look as its "sunrise" imaging.

Furthering public exposure, in 2009, the clothing store chain "Old Navy" began selling T-shirts bearing the old Gulf logo, along with the former logos of Standard Oil and Chevron.

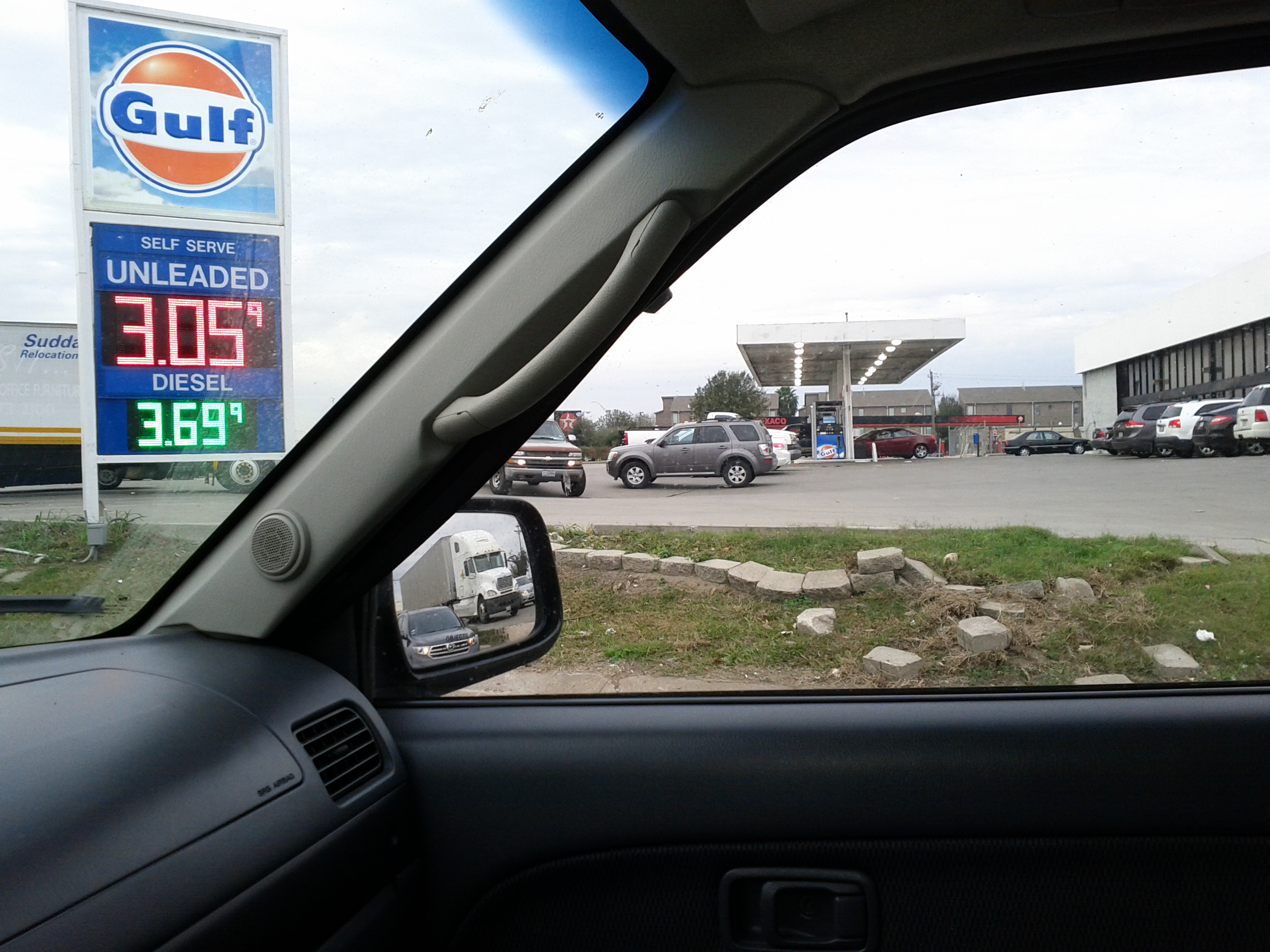
Standalone Gulf station in Houston, Texas, 2012.

In December 2009, Chevron USA announced it would no longer serve 1100 stations in 13 states. On January 12, 2010, after using the name since 1986, the Gulf Oil partnership acquired all right, title and interest in the Gulf brand name in the United States and announced plans to expand the use of the Gulf brand beyond eleven states from Ohio to Delaware and northeastward. Chevron USA had the rights to the Gulf name elsewhere but used Chevron or Texaco in those areas. The first areas where Gulf would expand would be those Chevron and Texaco stations included in the 2009 announcement. Later, The Pantry of Cary, North Carolina would likely consider the Gulf name, according to Gulf Oil COO Ron Sabia, though Pantry officials did not comment on such a possibility. On March 10, 2010, Gulf Oil announced an agreement with Somerset Petroleum to change nine stations to Gulf, five of them Chevron, giving Kentucky its first Gulf stations since 1990. Gulf Oil formed a partnership with Milo Cockerham Inc. to return the Gulf name to Virginia for the first time since 1986. Chevron stations in the southwestern part of the state made the change in July 2010.

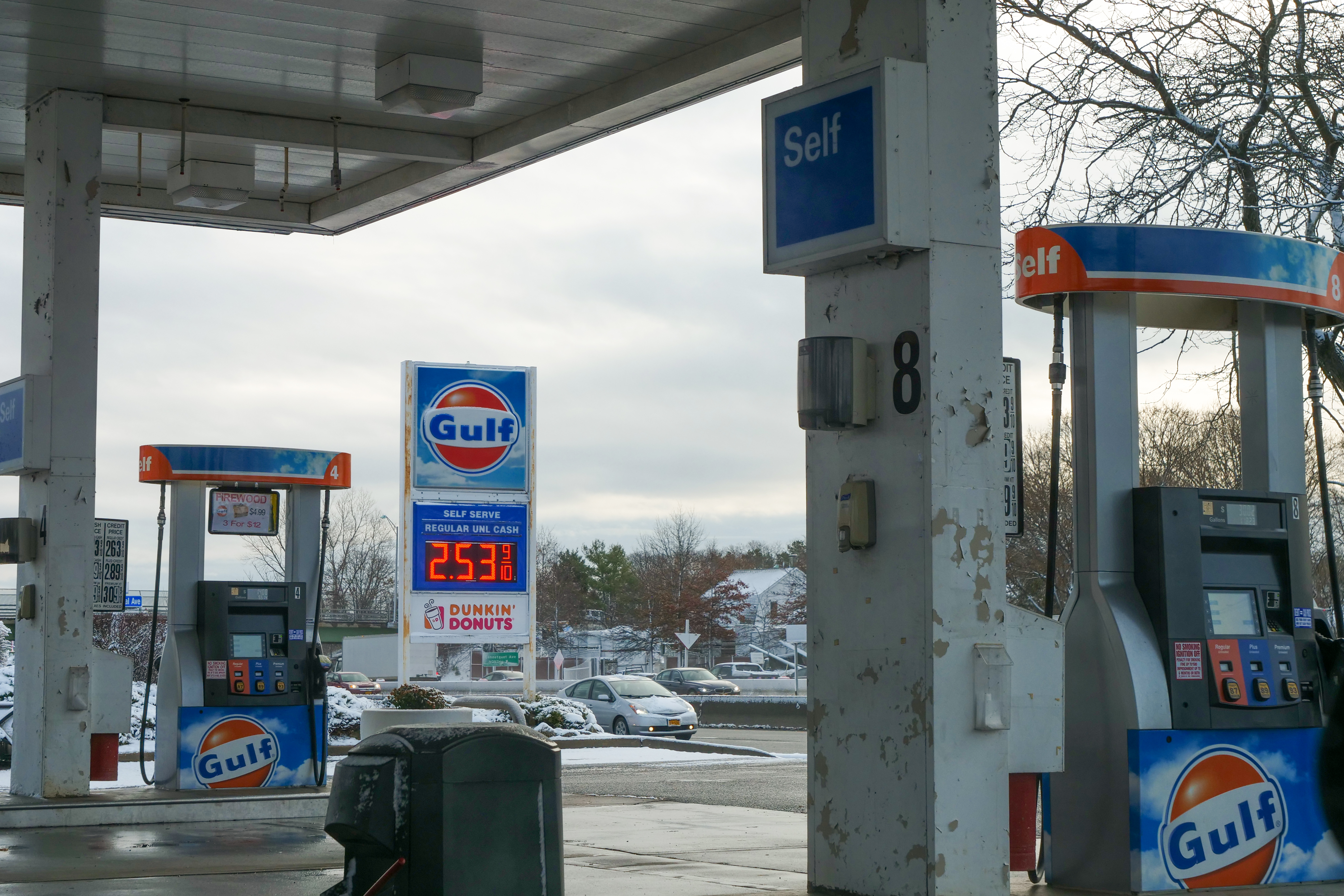
Gulf fuel pumps in Islip, New York, 2019.

As of May 2013, Gulf Oil LP had locations in Arkansas, Connecticut, Delaware, the District of Columbia, Florida, Georgia, Indiana, Kentucky, Louisiana, Maine, Maryland, Massachusetts, Michigan, Minnesota, Missouri, New Hampshire, New Jersey, New York, North Carolina, Ohio, Pennsylvania, Puerto Rico, Rhode Island, South Carolina, Tennessee, Texas, Vermont, Virginia, and West Virginia.

In December 2015, ArcLight Capital Partners purchased Gulf Oil LP from Cumberland Farms for $800 million.

Gulf Oil offered residential and commercial electric service for residents in New York and five New England states: Connecticut, Maine, Massachusetts, Rhode Island, and New Hampshire. This was transferred to Think Energy in 2015.

In 2020, Gulf Oil paid $2,400,000 to settle allegations that they had "violated Clean Air Act fuel quality standards that are designed to reduce air pollution from motor vehicles".

On July 5, 2023, RaceTrac announced its subsidiary, Metroplex Energy, agreed to buy Gulf Oil LP for an undisclosed amount. On December 14, 2023, the acquisition was completed.

== See also ==
- Gulf Oil, defunct predecessor company
