= Forecourt =

Forecourt may refer to:

- a courtyard at the front of a building
- in racket sports, the front part of the court
- the area in a filling station containing the fuel pumps
- chamber tomb forecourt, Stone Age architectural element

== See also ==
- Forecourt Fountain, former name of Keller Fountain, Portland, Oregon, United States
- Forecourt Piers, 123 Mortlake High Street, Richmond upon Thames, United Kingdom
