= RaceTrac =

American gasoline retail company

RaceTrac, Inc.

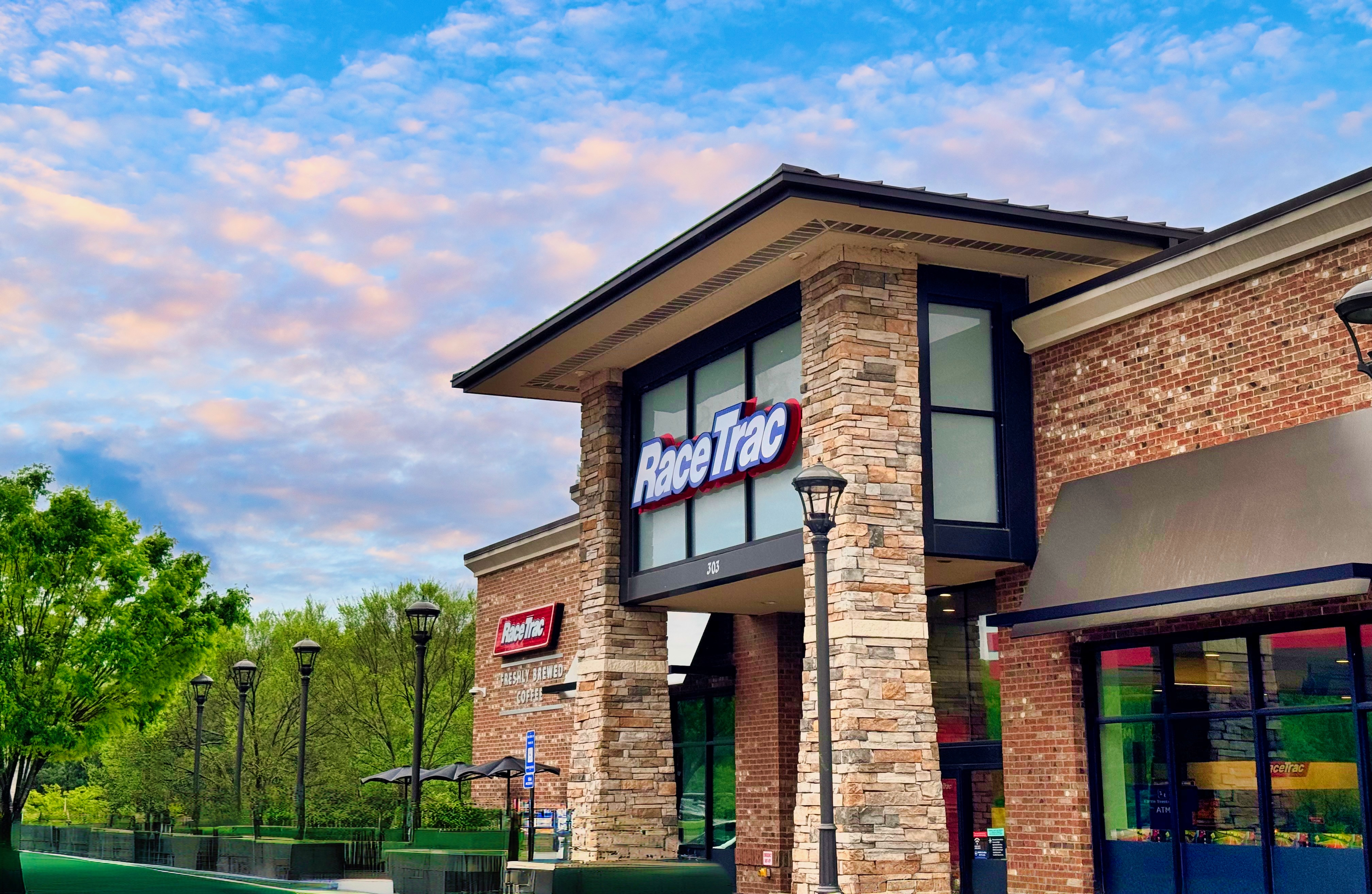
- Formerly: Carl Bolch Trackside Stations (1934–1979)
- Type: Private
- Industry: Retail; Convenience stores
- Founded: 1934; 92 years ago
- Founder: Carl Bolch Sr.
- Headquarters: Atlanta, Georgia, US
- Number of locations: 667
- Key people: Carl Bolch; Natalie Bolch Morhous; Max McBrayer
- Number of employees: 10,082
- Subsidiaries: Gulf Oil; Potbelly Sandwich Shop
- Website: racetrac.com

RaceTrac, Inc. is an American corporation that operates a chain of gasoline service stations across the Southern United States. In 2023, Forbes ranked RaceTrac as the 18th largest private company in the United States with a yearly revenue of US$19.72 billion.

== History ==
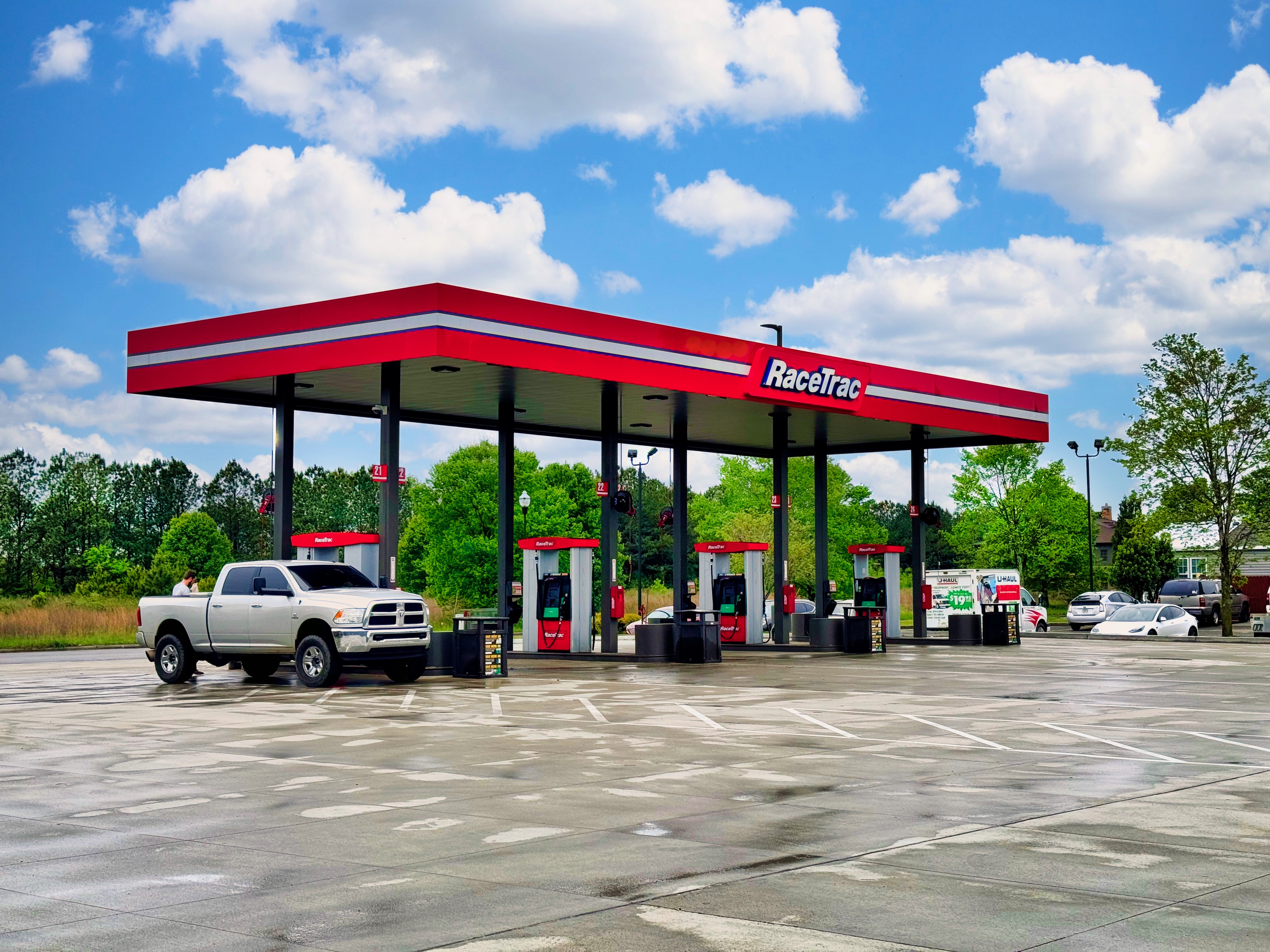
A RaceTrac in Jasper, Georgia

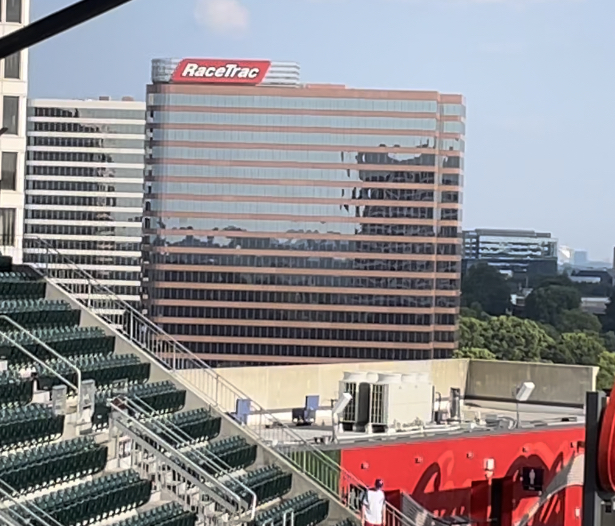
The RaceTrac corporate office in Cumberland, Georgia, as seen from Truist Park

Carl Bolch Sr. founded the company in 1934 in St. Louis, Missouri, with his first stores operating under the name Carl Bolch Trackside Stations. In 1959, Bolch relocated and acquired the Oil Well Company of Opp, Alabama, which consisted of numerous independent outlets across rural Alabama.

His son, Carl Bolch Jr., who succeeded his father as chief executive, joined the company in Montgomery, Alabama in 1967. After pioneering the concept of self-service gasoline in Alabama, Florida, and Georgia, the company relocated its headquarters to Atlanta, Georgia in 1976. In 1979, all company-operated stores adopted the RaceTrac brand, and all contractor-operated stores took on the RaceWay brand.

In 1996, RaceTrac founded Metroplex Energy, a wholly owned subsidiary of RaceTrac, Inc. and a wholesale fuel supplying company that secures bulk fuel to supply RaceTrac and RaceWay stores and other third-party companies.

On December 31, 2012, Carl Bolch Jr. transitioned the CEO title to his daughter, Allison Bolch Moran. During that time, Bolch Jr. maintained his executive chairman position. In February 2019, Max McBrayer became CEO of RaceTrac and Natalie Bolch Morhous became President of RaceTrac. On January 2, 2024, Natalie Morhous became CEO of RaceTrac, replacing Max McBrayer. Natalie Morhous is the current executive chairman of the RaceTrac board.

On April 5, 2021, employee tax and financial records, and email addresses and first names of some of the RaceTrac Rewards Loyalty users were illegally accessed and posted to the victim shaming site for the Clop ransomware gang.

On July 5, 2023, RaceTrac announced that its subsidiary, Metroplex Energy, agreed to acquire Gulf Oil LP for an undisclosed amount. On December 14, 2023, the acquisition was completed. The acquisition marks the largest in the company's history, expanding its scale and operating network. As part of the transaction, RaceTrac acquired Gulf's legacy brand in the United States and Puerto Rico, all Gulf-branded distributor and license agreements comprising approximately 1,100 branded sites, as well as exclusive rights to market fuel at eleven Massachusetts Turnpike service plaza locations.

Two years later, RaceTrac acquired Potbelly Sandwich Shop, a Chicago-based sandwich chain with more than 445 stores across the U.S. The company was acquired for $556 million in cash in September 2025.

== Locations ==
RaceTrac, Inc. operates more than 600 retail gasoline convenience stores and travel centers in 14 US states under the RaceTrac (company-operated) and RaceWay (contract operator-operated) names. Most RaceTrac locations feature 20 to 24 fueling positions and a 5,000-square-foot (460 m^{2}) convenience store selling more than 4,000 items. In January 2012, RaceTrac introduced its new 6,000 sq ft (560 m^{2}) store design, which features Swirl World frozen yogurt, free Wi-Fi internet and indoor and outdoor seating.

RaceTrac locations operate in Alabama, Florida, Georgia, Indiana, Kentucky, Louisiana, Mississippi, North Carolina, Ohio, South Carolina, Tennessee, and Texas. In 2012, there were more than 200 RaceWay-branded locations in Alabama, Arkansas, Florida, Georgia, Louisiana, Mississippi, North Carolina, South Carolina, Tennessee, Texas, and Virginia.

In 2023, RaceTrac announced plans for an expansion into Indiana and Ohio, marking the chain's entry into the Midwestern United States.
