= Kwik Shop =

American convenience store and gas station chain

- Company type: Private business
- Industry: Retail (Convenience stores)
- Founded: 1959 (67 years ago) in Hutchinson, Kansas
- Founder: Dillon Stores
- Headquarters: Westborough, MA, United States
- Number of locations: 127
- Area served: Kansas, Nebraska, Iowa
- Products: Petroleum
- Parent: EG America
- Website: www.kwikshop.com

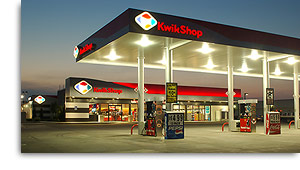
Kwik Shop

Kwik Shop is a chain of convenience stores and gas stations located throughout Kansas, Nebraska, and Iowa. They offer cold beverages, coffee, snack items, general foods, lottery tickets, and gasoline. It is owned by EG America, which is headquartered in Westborough, MA.

== History ==
=== 1960s ===
Kwik Shop was founded as an operating division of Dillons, in 1959.

Dick Dillon developed the Kwik Shop concept, combining the time-saving and personalized service of a small store with supermarket efficiency in management, inventory control and merchandising. In the late 1960s, Kwik Shop expanded into a three state market area of Kansas, Nebraska, and Iowa.

=== 1970s ===
In 1972, Kwik Power Gasoline was introduced, offering self-service gasoline for complete one-stop service.

In 1978, the 100th Kwik Shop opened store #629 in Bellevue, Nebraska. Kwik Shop also began operating stores 24 hours per day. It also became one of the first convenience store chains in the nation to install fountain drink equipment in its stores.

=== 1980s ===
In 1980, Kwik Shop celebrated its 20th anniversary.

In 1982, Kwik Shop entered the food service business with 15 stores offering fresh Sub 'N Stuff sandwiches. In addition, a new logo was incorporated.

In 1983, Dillon Companies, Inc and Kwik Shop merged with Kroger Companies to become the largest food retailer in the United States.

In 1987, Kwik Shop introduced fresh a hot dog roller grill offering.

=== 1990s ===
In 1995, Kwik Shop celebrated its 35th anniversary.

In 1997, a new logo was incorporated.

In 1999, Kwik Shop began selling prepaid phone cards.

=== 2000-present ===
In 2000, Kwik Shop partnered with Dillons to offer Dillon Plus Shopper's Card-Fuel Discounts.

In 2001, Baker's gasoline discounts offered to Nebraska customers.

In 2002, Kwik Shop started the Kwik Shop/United Way Golf Challenge, an annual fund-raiser golf tournament with all proceeds going to the United Way.

In 2004, Kroger launched a new logo concept for all Kroger convenience stores. New Coffee Central was introduced companywide, and New Soda Central introduced companywide.

In 2005, Store 730 in Newton, Kansas opened and was the first Kwik Shop store with the new Kroger image.

In 2007, customer service was further improved with the implementation of scanning at all locations.

And in 2008, Kwik Shop partnered with Dillons to allow customers to electronically redeem Fuel Frenzy fuel discounts at all Wichita-area Kwik Shop stores.

In early February 2018, Kroger announced it had reached an agreement to sell its entire convenience store portfolio including Kwik Shop to EG Group, for $2.15 billion.
