= Casey's =

American convenience store chain

Casey's General Stores, Inc.
- Casey's logo since October 2020

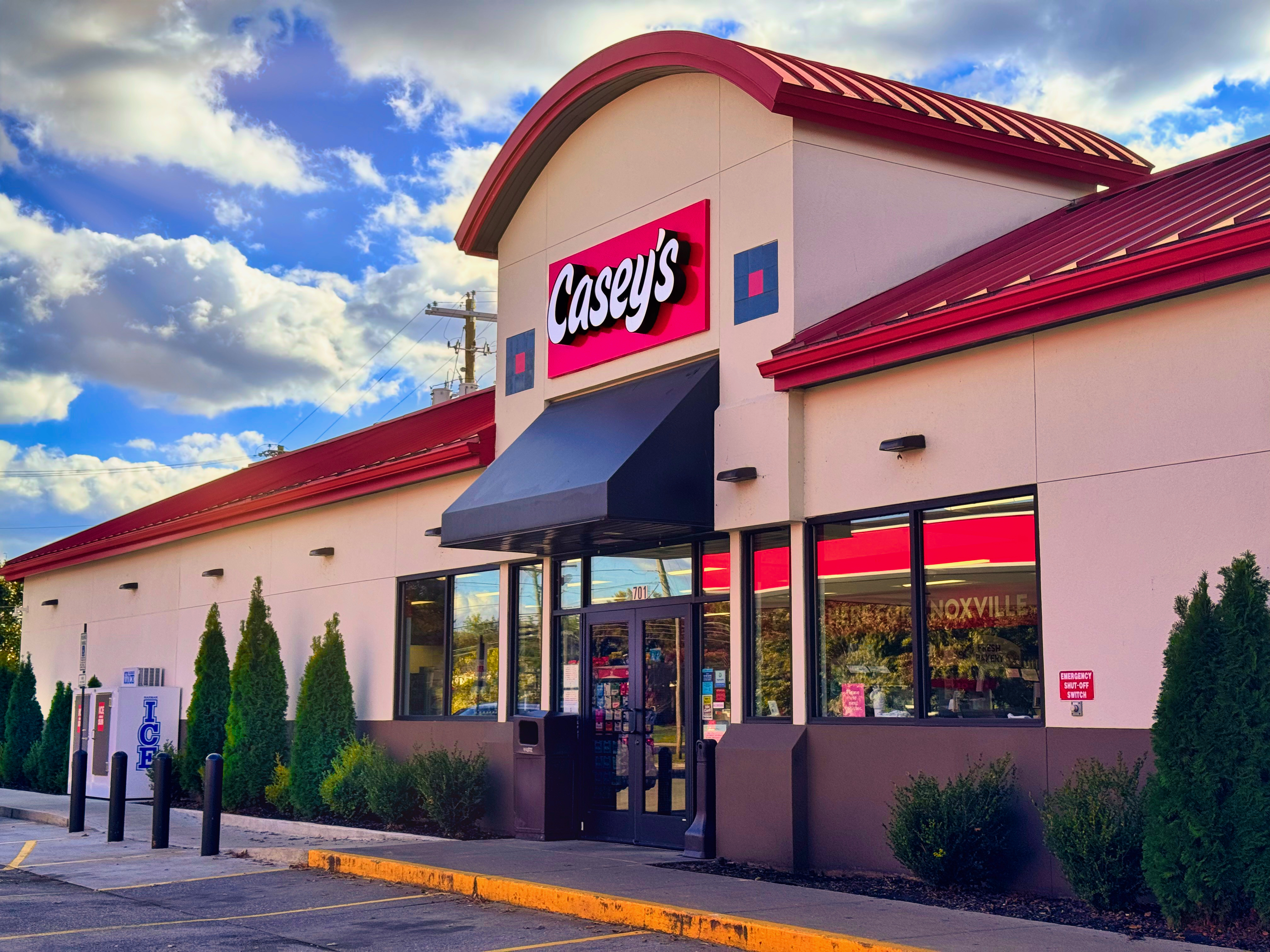
- Casey's store in Farragut, Tennessee
- Trade name: Casey's
- Type: Public
- Traded as: Nasdaq: CASY; S&P 500 component
- Industry: Retail
- Founded: 1968; 58 years ago in Boone, Iowa, U.S.
- Founder: Donald Lamberti
- Headquarters: Ankeny, Iowa, U.S.
- Number of locations: 2,920; (FY April 2026)
- Area served: Midwestern and Southern United States
- Key people: Darren Rebelez (Chairman); Darren Rebelez (President & CEO); Steven Bramlage (CFO)
- Products: Pizza; Coffee; Wings; Prepared foods; Gasoline; Beverages; Snacks; Dairy products; Salads
- Services: Convenience store; Gas station; Fast food
- Revenue: ▲US$17.561 billion (FY 2026)
- Net income: ▲US$714 million (FY 2026)
- Total assets: ▲US$8.936 billion (FY 2026)
- Total equity: ▲US$3.951 billion (FY 2026)
- Number of employees: 2026: 23,490 (full-time); 26,358 (part-time)
- Website: www.caseys.com

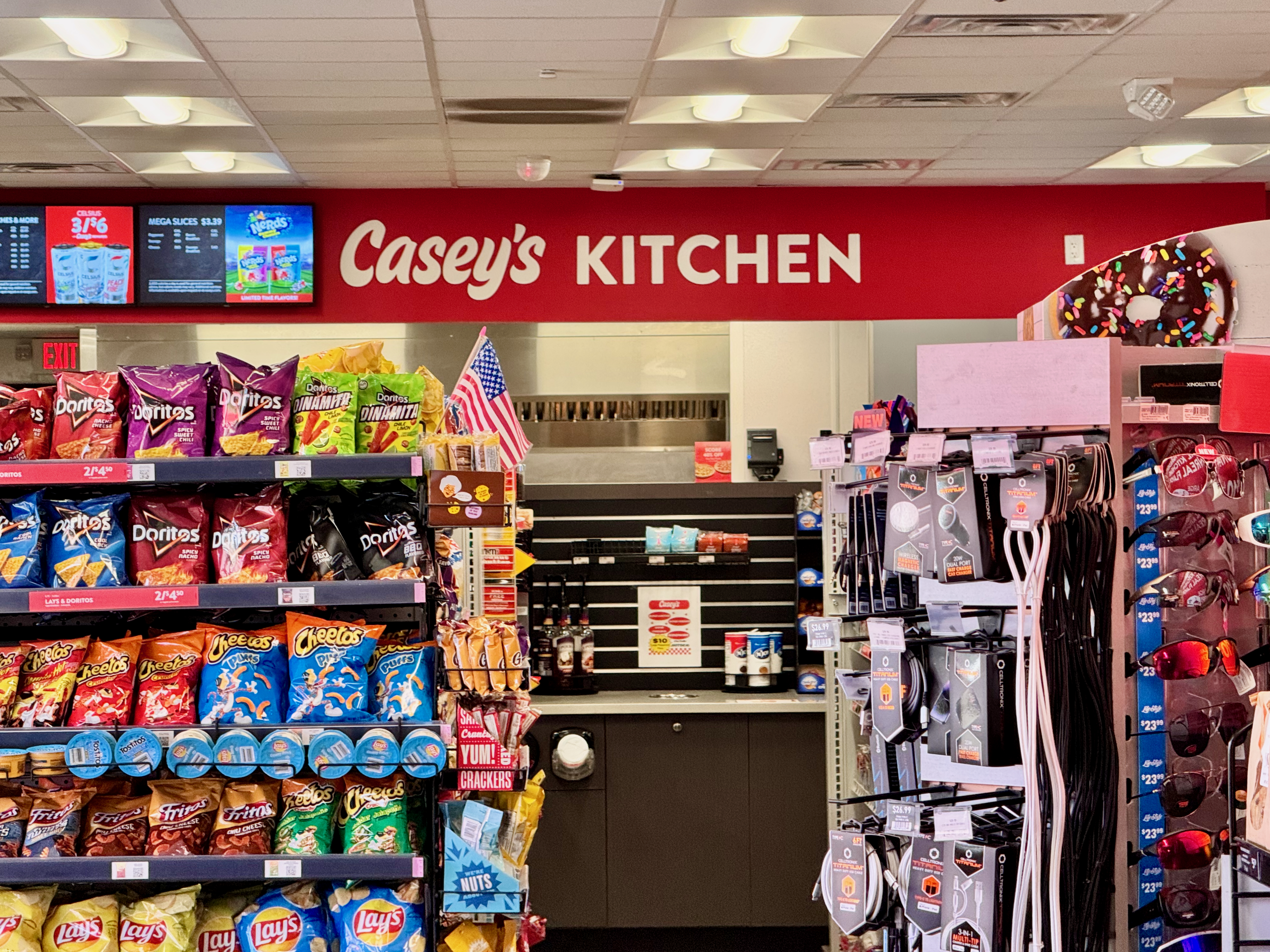
Interior of a typical Casey's store

Casey's General Stores, Inc. (doing business as Casey's) is a chain of convenience stores that operates in the Midwestern and Southern United States. It is the third-largest chain in the country by locations (2,950), after 7-Eleven and Alimentation Couche-Tard, and the largest American-owned chain. Casey's is the fifth largest pizza chain in the U.S. based on sales. Most of its stores are in towns with under 20,000 inhabitants.

The company is headquartered in Ankeny, Iowa, and is ranked the 282nd on the Fortune 500 and 1092nd on the Forbes Global 2000.

== History ==
In 1959, Donald Lamberti leased a service station in Des Moines, Iowa, from his father. After he had successfully remodeled the station into a convenience store and operated it for nine years, in 1968, his gasoline supplier and friend, Kurvin C. (K.C.) Fish, suggested that he purchase the Square Deal Oil Company, a service station available for sale in Boone, Iowa. Lamberti followed Fish's advice and purchased the station, which he renamed "Casey's" after Fish, then converted it into a convenience store. He avoided the name Lamberti's since he said that some people do not like Italians. The logo on the Boone store was used by the chain until 2020.

The Boone store, located in a town of only 12,500, did well, so Lamberti built another store in Creston, Iowa, with a population of 7,000, and that store also did well. Lamberti then opened a store in the even smaller town of Waukee, Iowa, with a population of 1,500 at the time. The Waukee store proved to be the most successful of the three, so Lamberti purchased and opened more stores, concentrating on towns of less than 5,000 people.

=== 1970s–1990s ===
By the late 1970s, the chain had 118 stores and opened its first warehouse. The original store, operated by Lamberti's parents, entered the Casey's fold in 1977.

In 1982, Casey's opened its first Distribution Center in Urbandale, Iowa.

In October 1983, Casey's became a public company via an initial public offering. Around this time, Casey's began to sell doughnuts and pizza in its stores. The store also briefly introduced fried chicken before abandoning the endeavor.

In 1990, Casey's moved to its current facility in Ankeny, Iowa.

In 1993, it was named convenience store chain of the year by Convenience Store Decisions magazine.

Casey's 1,000th store opened in Altoona, Iowa, in 1996, the same year Casey's exceeded US$1 billion in annual sales. In 1998, Lamberti resigned as CEO and became the company's chairman. He retired in 2002.

=== 2000s–2020s ===
In January 2006, Casey's acquired Lincoln, Nebraska-based Gas 'N Shop, with 58 stores.

In August 2006, Casey's agreed to purchase the 33-store HandiMart chain, based in Cedar Rapids, Iowa, in a $63 million deal.

In March 2010, Alimentation Couche-Tard, operator of several convenience store chains, including Circle K, offered $1.9 billion for the company and launched a proxy fight for control. In September 2010, 7-Eleven offered $2 billion for the company. Shareholders rejected Couche-Tard's offer and voted for retaining Casey's board of directors as opposed to voting for Couche-Tard's nominated slate. In November 2010, Casey's ended merger discussions with 7-Eleven.

In February 2011, the company acquired 11 stores in Minnesota.

In February 2016, the company launched a mobile app.

In April 2016, Casey's opened a distribution center in Terre Haute, Indiana, the company's second.

=== 2020–present ===
In January 2020, the company introduced a loyalty program.

In October 2020, Casey's announced a rebranding, including a new logo and dropping 'General Stores' from its signage (though it remained in the legal corporate name until 2022).

In November 2020, Casey's acquired Bucky's Convenience Stores, a 94-store chain, for $580 million.

In 2021 Casey's began branding small-footprint stores without kitchens as "goodstop by Casey’s".

In April 2021, Casey's opened a third distribution center in Joplin, Missouri.

In May 2024, the company acquired Buchanan Energy and became the owner of 94 Bucky's Convenience Stores. As part of the deal, Casey's was required by regulators to divest six stores.

In September 2021, Casey's purchased 38 Pilot Food Mart locations and two truck stop locations from Pilot Company. The locations in East Tennessee, around the Knoxville area, were owned by the Haslam family outright and not part of the company's Pilot Flying J national truck stop chain jointly owned by Pilot, Berkshire Hathaway, and FJ Management.

In October 2023, Casey's purchased 63 Minit Mart and Certified Oil locations in Kentucky and Middle Tennessee.

In November 2023, Casey's expanded into Texas with the purchase of 22 convenience stores mainly in North Texas.

In November 2024, Casey's acquired Fikes Wholesale, including its chain of CEFCO convenience stores, for $1.145 billion. The deal added nearly 200 stores and expanded Casey's further into Texas as well as for the first time into the states of Alabama, Florida, and Mississippi.

In September 2024, Casey's purchased 4 stores from Oakcrest Market, expanding its presence in the area of Fort Smith, Arkansas.

In October 2024, Casey's purchased the naming rights to the Casey's Center in a 10-year $18 million deal.

In January 2025, the company acquired Wow! Foodmart, with 7 convenience stores, a travel center, and 4 liquor stores in central Kentucky.

In September 2025, the company acquired stores in Michigan.

In June 2026, the company sold 41 stores, exiting Mississippi.

In August 2026, the company acquired 24 stores in Texas from Pak-A-Sak.

== Locations ==
Casey's stores are located in the following states:

- Alabama
- Arkansas
- Florida
- Illinois
- Indiana
- Iowa
- Kansas
- Kentucky
- Michigan
- Minnesota
- Missouri
- Nebraska
- North Dakota
- Ohio
- Oklahoma
- South Dakota
- Tennessee
- Texas
- Wisconsin

== Legal issues ==
In April 2026, the company agreed to pay $5.1 million to settle a class action lawsuit for charging tobacco-using employees a $910/year surcharge for health insurance, in violation of ERISA.
