= Minit Mart =

American regional convenience store chain

Minit Mart LLC
- Type: Subsidiary
- Industry: Retail (Convenience stores)
- Founded: Lexington, Kentucky in 1967; 59 years ago
- Founder: Ralph and Fred Higgins
- Headquarters: Cincinnati, Ohio, United States
- Number of locations: 294 (as of 2017)
- Key people: Fred Higgins (founder)
- Products: Marathon gasoline Godfather's Pizza; O'Deli's sub shops
- Services: Fuel; Fast food Convenience store
- Parent: EG Group
- Website: www.minitmart.com

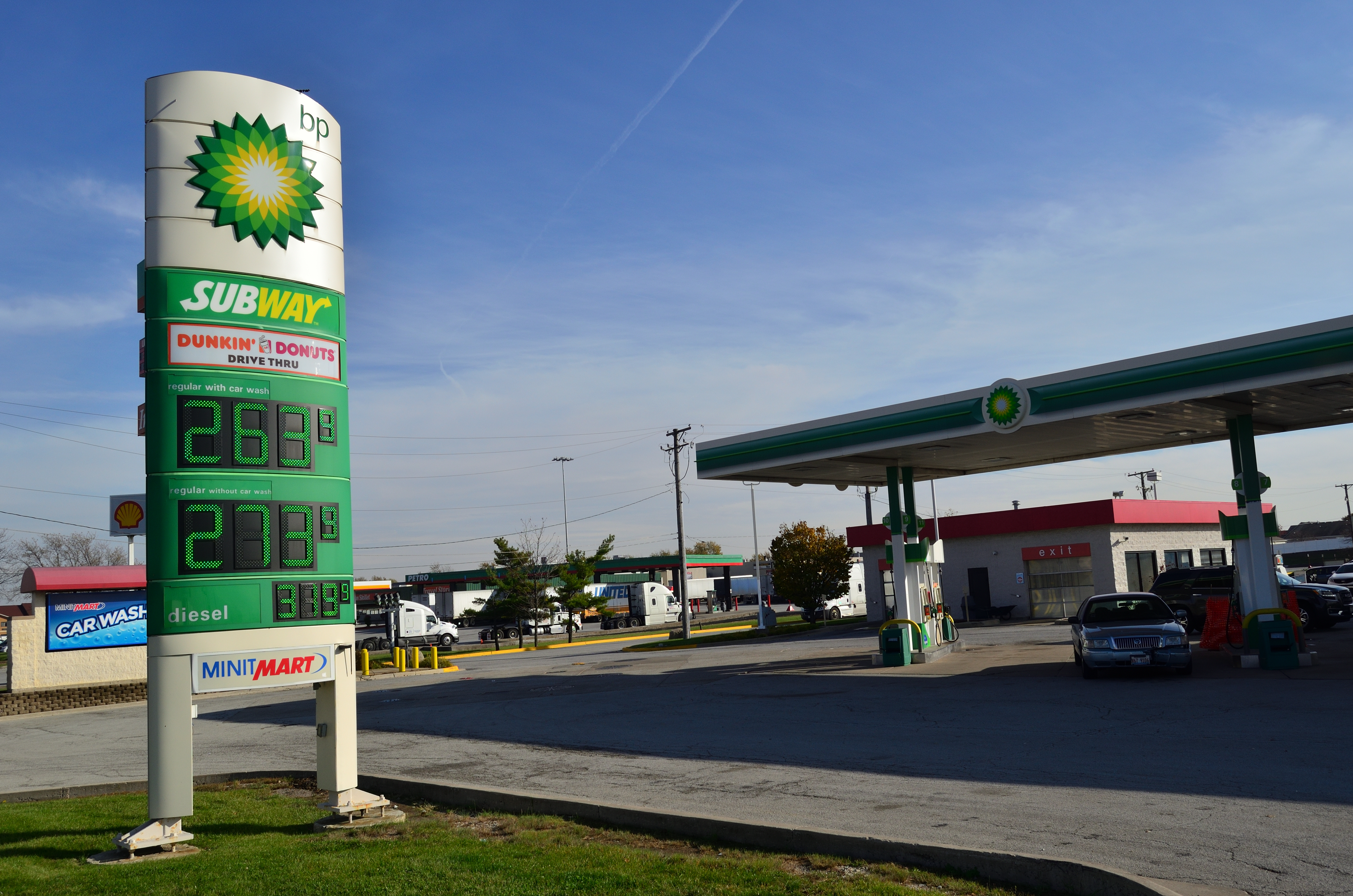
Minit Mart at a gas station in Illinois

Minit Mart LLC is a chain of convenience stores operating in South Central and Western Kentucky, northern Middle Tennessee, eastern Wisconsin, the Kansas City metropolitan area, Northeast Illinois, and Northeast Ohio. Its corporate offices are located in Cincinnati, Ohio, and the chain consists of 231 locations scattered around the United States.

== History ==
=== The early days ===
In 1967, Fred Higgins, and his father, Ralph, the latter of whom previously operated a now-out-of-business Stuckey's location just outside of Smiths Grove, Kentucky, and had owned locations in four other states, founded a new convenience store, known as Minit Mart. After having gained experience from working for his father, by the time Fred graduated from law school at the University of Kentucky in the spring of 1969, he expanded the operation to a chain of six locations in the metro Lexington area.

Fred Higgins served in the U.S. Army between 1969 and 1972. When he returned in 1972, Minit Mart Foods became incorporated with 16 locations. After that time, Fred began acquiring single convenience stores and select sites on which to build new locations across Kentucky. The chain's original headquarters were located in Bowling Green, Kentucky.

During the 1970s, Minit Mart became one of the first convenience store chains to add gas pumps to their locations. Marathon brand gasoline has been part of Minit Mart's offered services since then. Minit Mart was at the forefront of adding delis and game machines during the same decade. Minit Mart started offering videotaped movie rentals when the VHS format gained popularity in the very late 1970s and early 1980s after it beat out the Betamax videocassette format. DVD movie rentals began to be utilized by Minit Mart around 2000.

Ralph Higgins, the co-founder, played an active role in the management of Minit Mart Foods Inc until his 1987 death.

=== Expansion into Tennessee ===
Minit Mart began to expand in Tennessee in 1988 after acquiring 19 Bread Box convenience stores. By 1991, Minit Mart had 107 stores in Kentucky and Tennessee. Many locations included Godfather's Pizza and O'Deli's, the latter of which was Minit Mart's in-house sub sandwich shop for much of the chain's existence in Kentucky. Other select locations also previously served Baskin-Robbins ice cream and had Taco Bell Express restaurants, thereby grossing $250 million each year, and employing exactly 1,200 people.

=== Operation changes ===
In 1998, Fred lost his wife of 25 years to cancer; she was diagnosed in 1978. After the loss of his wife, he and the management team decided the chain needed change. In 2001, Minit Mart Foods leased its operations to Clark Retail, retaining ownership of the assets. In addition to Clark's original 600 stores, that company also acquired several other chains in the Midwestern United States, mainly in Indiana and Illinois, growing to approximately 1,200 stores. Competition, however, was intense during that time, and Clark eventually ended up in bankruptcy. After filing for bankruptcy, Clark returned 37 stores to Minit Mart Foods Inc.

Fred's Minit Mart LLC had taken over the operation in August 2003. A management team was formed, and 34 locations remained in operation.

=== 2000s and 2010s ===
During the first two decades of the 21st century, Minit Mart operates 34 locations. Most of them are in Kentucky, but there were two locations operating in the middle Tennessee cities of Clarksville, and one in Algood, Tennessee near Cookeville. All locations are combinations of convenience and grocery shopping, and for many years, feature Marathon Gasoline. Godfather's Pizza and O'Deli's sub shops continued to be offered in most locations. In addition to those two, most Minit Mart locations also offer World Blends fresh coffee (formerly CuppaJoe), and Minit Mix.

In 2007, a Godfather's Pizza large one-topping pizza deal selling for $5.00 that summer (later $5.99 in late 2007, and then $7.99 between spring 2008 and summer 2010) provided a boost in sales. Regular prices returned in 2009.

In 2008, Minit Mart introduced Minit Mix, allowing customers to create a soft drink mixed with certain flavors, including vanilla or cherry, a similar service to Coca-Cola's Freestyle machines.

Beginning in 2012, all Minit Mart locations added ATM kiosks without service charges. The following year, Minit Mart was sold to Travel Centers of America for $67 million.

In the early 2010s, new buildings were built to house the Minit Mart locations in Brownsville and Glasgow, Kentucky, just a couple hundred feet from their respective original locations. The old buildings were destroyed a few weeks after the completion and official opening of the new present building due to old age. The destruction of the old buildings made way for a larger parking lot, a few more entrances, and more fuel pumps. Several Minit Mart locations were expanded over time through at least 2014.

In 2015, four years before his death, Fred Higgins sold the Minit Mart convenience store chain to TravelCenters of America for $67 million. In January 2015, Minit Mart purchased additional stores and rebranded them, including a few in the Jackson Purchase region of western Kentucky, including one in Paducah, and one in Centerville, Indiana, the latter of which was the chain's first Indiana location.

In late March 2016 TCA closed on the purchase of Quality State Oil's QMart Marketplace 17-store chain of convenience stores based in Sheboygan, Wisconsin, which were immediately converted into Minit Mart locations. The acquisition was done mainly to acquire the technology and patents for QSO's convenience store industry award-winning RFID keychain card-based loyalty program.

In 2018, TCA sold the Minit Mart chain to EG America, a unit of the United Kingdom-based EG Group. By then, the Minit Mart brand was expanded to a total of 225 locations in Kentucky, Tennessee and the lower Midwest.

=== Pizza sales ===
According to Minit Mart's Facebook post on June 17, 2015, two Godfather's Pizza locations within the Minit Mart chain have been listed as the first and second place in terms of pizza sales. The location in Brownsville, Edmonson County, Kentucky had the highest sales of any non-traditional location in the entire Godfather's Pizza chain nationwide, with one of Minit Mart's Bowling Green-area locations taking second place.

=== 2020s ===
In August 2023, it was announced that approximately 63 Minit Mart and Certified Oil locations in Kentucky and Tennessee, including most of the chain's historic locations and all nine Bowling Green-area Minit Mart locations, would be acquired by the Ankeny, Iowa-based Casey's Retail Company, which previously opened a few locations in western and northern Kentucky. As a result of this acquisition, only two of Minit Mart's historical legacy locations (in Auburn and Cadiz) remain unchanged, albeit with new ownership by local investors as of February 2024.

== Competition in the region ==
Minit Mart's main competitors in southern Kentucky included Jr. Food Stores and Crossroads IGA locations. Both of those chains are owned by Houchens Industries, which also owns their flagship supermarket chain, Houchens Markets, and several IGA Foodliner stores in south central Kentucky. Minit Mart's other competitors included several locally owned convenience stores around southern Kentucky, some of which offer pizza and/or fried chicken, as well as some Speedway locations. Phillips 66-branded stores under the name "Traveler's Food Plaza" in areas around Glasgow, Edmonton, and Tompkinsville, Kentucky also competed with Minit Mart for quite some time. Gas stations offering rival branded gasoline also often competed with Minit Mart for consumer allegiances. In the eastern Wisconsin market, Minit Mart's main competitor is Kwik Trip.

== Key dates ==
- 1967: Fred and Ralph Higgins, a father-and-son duo, founded a convenience store in Lexington, Kentucky, under the name Minit Mart.
- 1969: Minit Mart expands to six locations around the Lexington area.
- 1970s: Minit Mart began offering Marathon gasoline.
- Late 1970s: Delis and game machines were added.
- Sometime between 1978 and 1983: Videotape rentals were first offered.
- Mid-1980s?: Godfather's Pizza became part of Minit Mart's offered services.
- 1988: Minit Mart expands to Tennessee after acquiring Bread Box stores in certain parts of that state.
- 1999–2000: DVD rentals were offered in tandem with VHS movie rentals.
- 2001: Clark Retail leased Minit Mart's operations.
- Unknown date: Minit Mart launches their website.
- 2003: Clark Retail went bankrupt, and 37 Minit Mart stores were returned to Fred's Minit Mart LLC.
- January 2008: Earnhardt + Friends had been chosen for the advertising firm of Minit Mart. Both companies experienced growth as a result. It spawned plans to rebuild locations in Harrodsburg and Nicholasville, Kentucky, to be rebuilt to add the two food service additions to those locations.
- 2008: Minit Mart introduces Minit Mix.
- 2008: Minit Mart was named Convenience Store of the Year by the Kentucky Association of Convenience Stores.
- 2011: Founder Fred Higgins was inducted in the Kentucky Grocers Association's Hall of Fame.
- 2013: The convenience store chain was sold to Travel Centers of America, Inc.
- 2015: Bought 19 stores from bankrupt GasMart USA based in Overland Park, Kansas. These 19 stores are convenience stores in Kansas and Missouri.
- 2016: Minit Mart enters Kansas City market with re-branding of 59 convenience stores, including convenience stores in Shawnee and De Soto.
- 2016: The Minit Mart brand came to several Shell stations in the Lexington area, mainly those with World Blends Coffee.

== Community support ==
In March 2014, Minit Mart raised almost $43,000 USD from employees and their customers for the Muscular Dystrophy Association (MDA) during their annual shamrock fundraising campaign around Saint Patrick's Day.
