= Cumberland Farms =

Convenience store retailer

Cumberland Farms Inc.
- Type: Private
- Industry: Retail
- Founded: 1939 (87 years ago); Cumberland, Rhode Island
- Founder: Vasillios Haseotes; Aphrodite Haseotes
- Headquarters: Westborough, Massachusetts
- Number of locations: 575+ (2024)
- Areas served: United States; Germany
- Products: Convenience stores Gas station
- Revenue: ▲US$6.3 billion (2018)
- Number of employees: 6,000
- Parent: EG Group (2019–)
- Subsidiaries: Gulf Oil LP (1986–2016)
- Website: cumberlandfarms.com

Cumberland Farms (colloquially known as Cumby's) is a convenience store chain, founded in 1939 by Greek immigrants in Cumberland, Rhode Island.

The chain operates primarily in the New England states, though it also has stores in New York, Florida, South Carolina and Georgia in the US, and has expanded internationally to Germany.

It has been owned by EG Group since 2019, following its sale by the founding Haseotes family. It remains based in Westborough, Massachusetts.

== History ==
In 1939, Greek immigrant couple Vasilios and Aphrodite Haseotes purchased a single-cow farm in Cumberland, Rhode Island, which eventually grew into a large dairy farm. Cumberland Farms opened a dairy store in Bellingham, Massachusetts, in 1958 and the first convenience store in New England in 1962.

On May 2, 1992, Cumberland Farms filed for Chapter 11 bankruptcy.

Cumberland Farms became a two-thirds limited partner in the Gulf Oil company in 1993, having obtained the right to sell gasoline under the Gulf name throughout the United States in 1986. In 2016, Cumberland Farms sold its entire holding in Gulf Oil.

In September 2010, Cumberland Farms sold 61 locations, then in June 2011 closed an additional 29 stores. According to management, these sales and closures were to redeploy capital to their remaining stores and new builds. In July 2018, Cumberland Farms closed several Florida locations to focus their attention on the state's East Coast.

In 2019, the company sued six towns over the prohibition on flavored tobacco ban contending that it gives dedicated smoke shops an advantage over convenience stores. The company sought injunction on the flavored tobacco ban sale, but its request was denied. In April 2023, an inspector from Braintree Board of Health found Black & Mild cigar on display in a store in Massachusetts, which was after the ban on flavored tobacco in Massachusetts and fined the store $1,000. The store fought the citation arguing that it "did not intend to sell" and appealed all the way to Massachusetts Supreme Judicial Court, but was in favor of Board of Health.

In April 2019, Cumberland Farms was reported to have retained Bank of America to explore a possible sale of the entire chain. By July 31, 2019, U.K.-based EG Group announced having entered a binding agreement to purchase Cumberland Farms from the founding Haseotes family.

In March 2026, Cumberland Farms had plans to acquire Coen Markets, a Pennsylvania chain of convenience stores and gas stations. Cumberland Farms opened its first international location, at Wolfslake West in Germany, rebranding a former EG Group site.

=== Branding and image ===
In the late 1960s, Cumberland Farms had a successful ad campaign that helped expand their franchise, in part due to jingles written by Brad Delp, who later co-founded the rock band Boston with Tom Scholz. In the past, Cumberland Farms television ads have featured actor David Hasselhoff. In spring 2019, Cumberland Farms television ads began using retired pro wrestling star, "The Nature Boy", Ric Flair.

The company’s original colors were navy blue and orange. However, in 2009, they rebranded with a new logo and colors (navy blue and green).

== Gallery ==
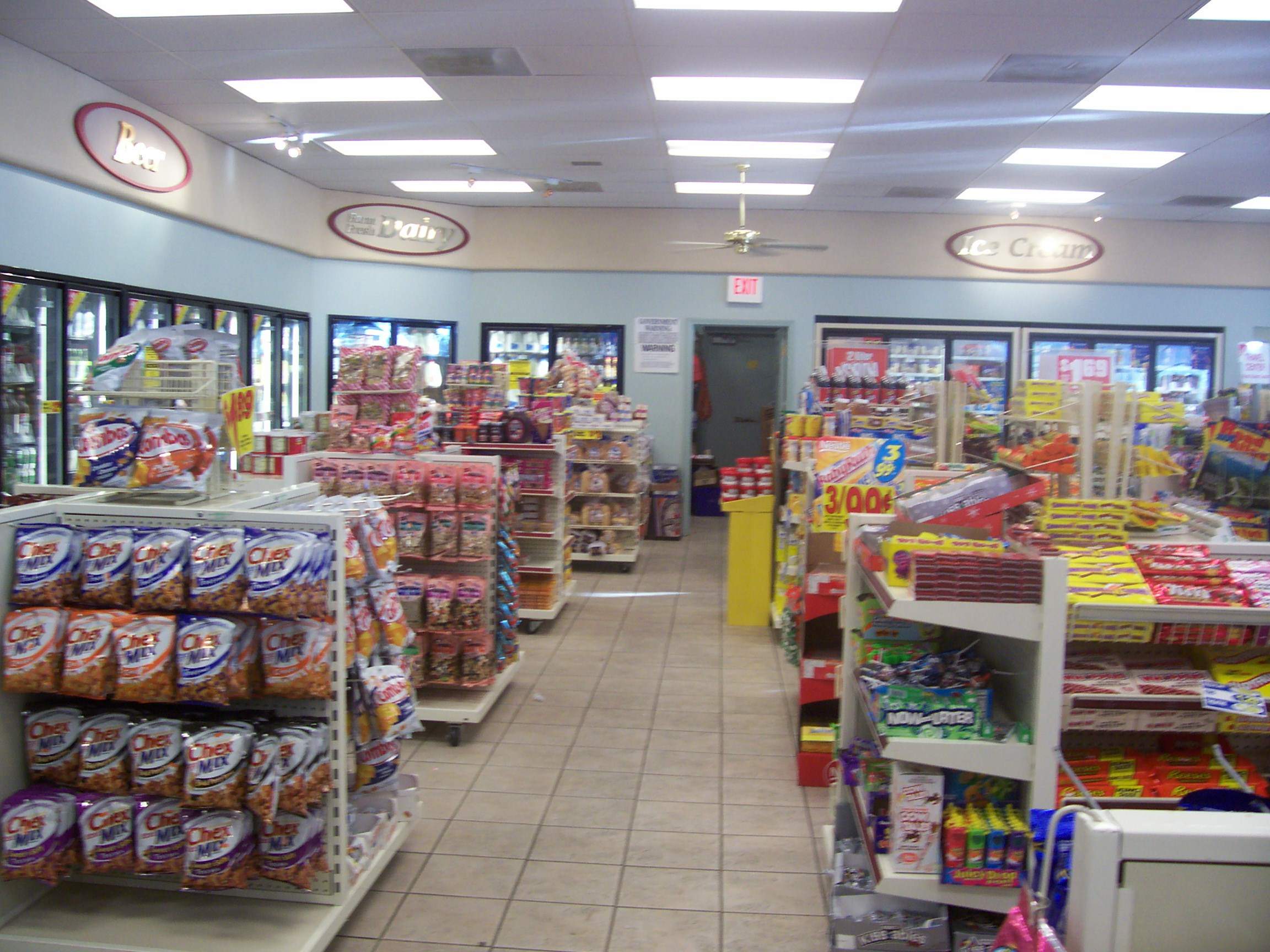
Interior of a store in Beekman, New York

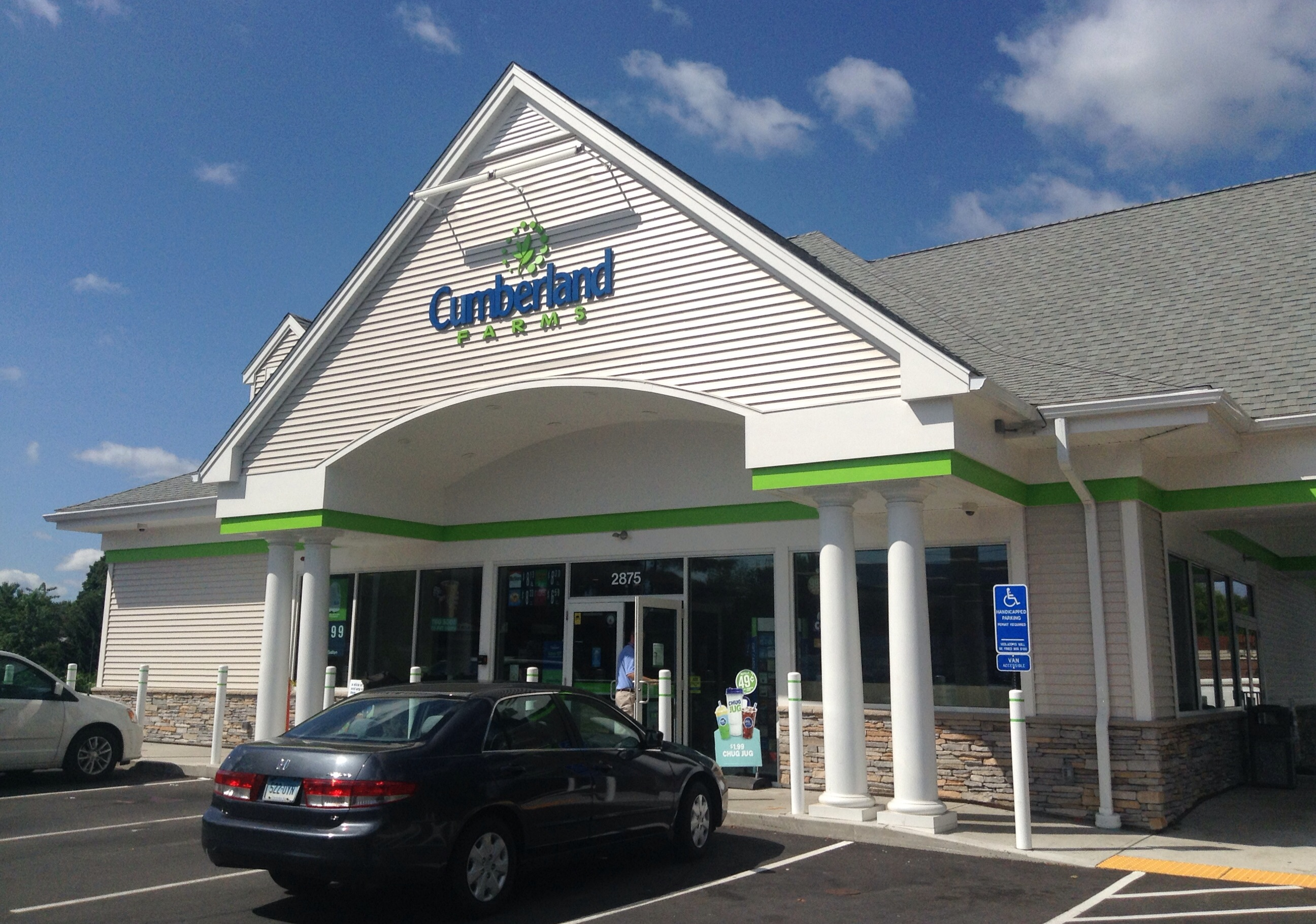
A location in Glastonbury, Connecticut

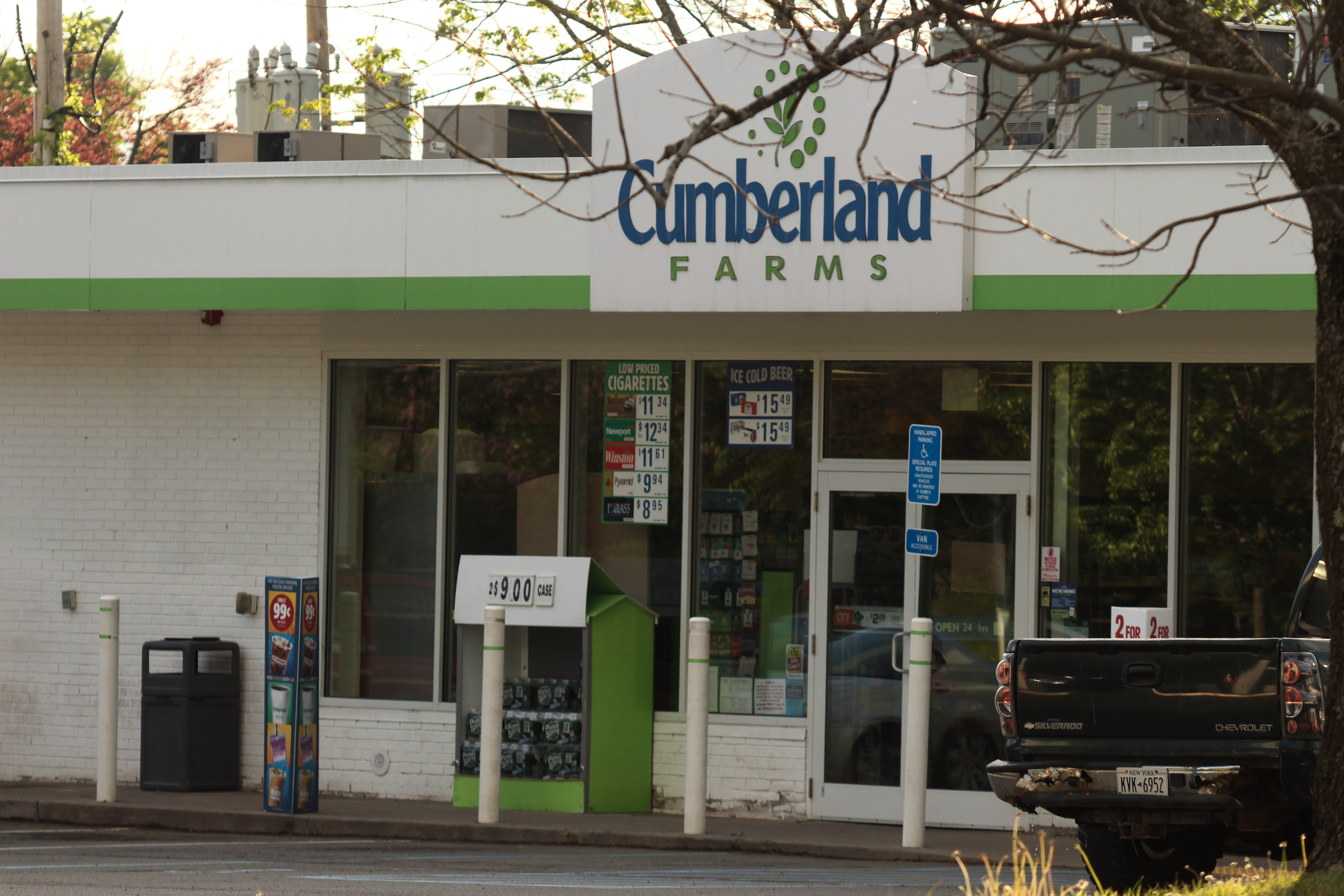
A location in Philmont, New York

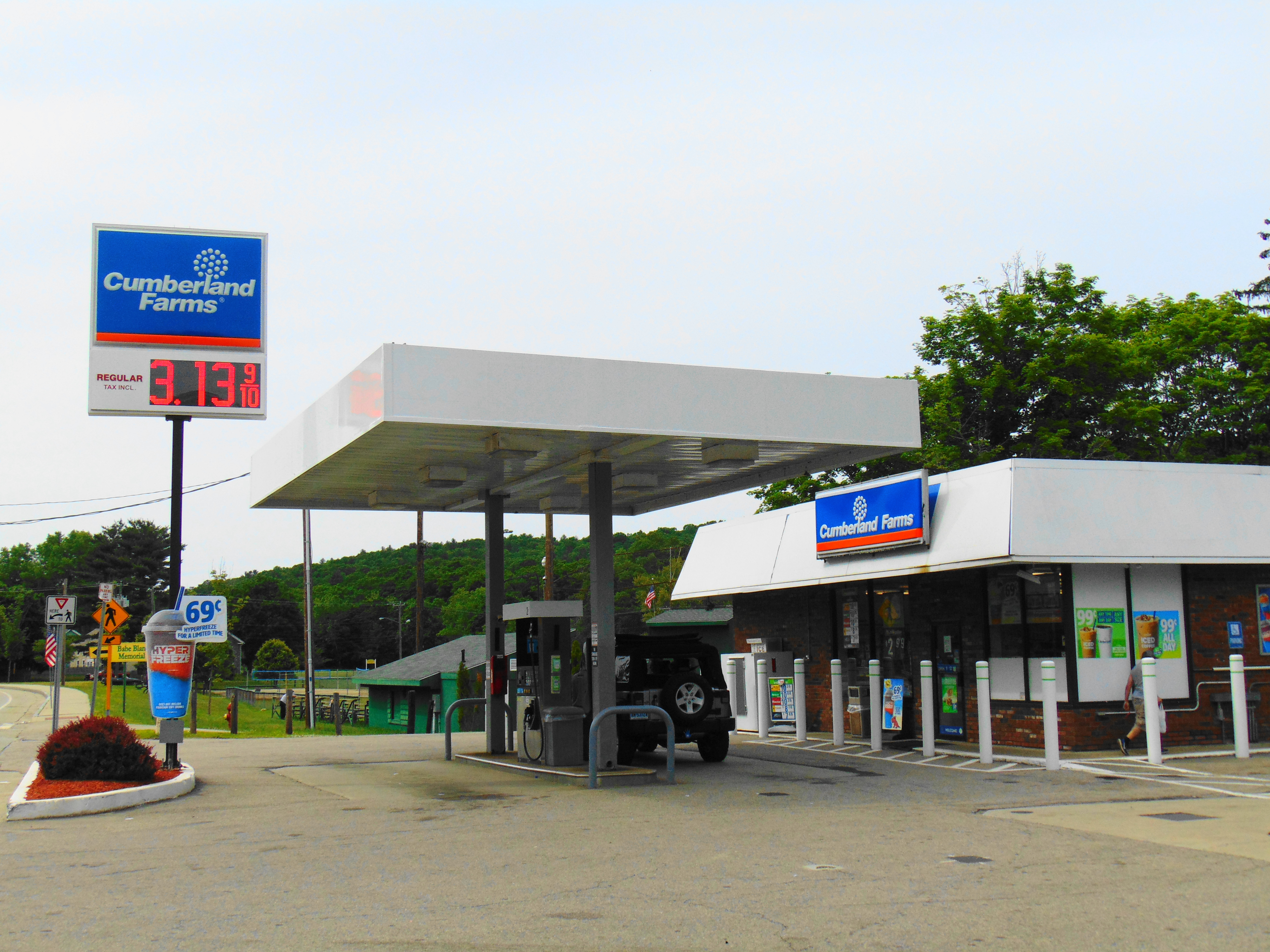
A location in Baltic, Connecticut
