= Hi-Life =

Hi-Life may refer to:

- Hi-Life (film), an American Christmas romantic comedy film written and directed by Roger Hedden
- Hi-Life (convenience store), a Taiwanese convenience chain store
