= Seicomart =

Japanese food company/business

Seicomart Co., Ltd.
- Native name: 株式会社セイコーマート
- Romanized name: Kabushiki-gaisha Seikōmāto
- Type: Private
- Industry: Convenience store
- Founded: August 10, 1971; 55 years ago (as chain; company incorporated 1974)
- Founder: Akihiko Akao
- Headquarters: Chūō-ku, Sapporo, Hokkaido, Japan
- Number of locations: 1,199 (as of January 2026: 1,098 in Hokkaido, 101 in Kanto region)
- Area served: Primarily Hokkaido; also Ibaraki Prefecture and Saitama Prefecture
- Key people: Hiroaki Akao (President)
- Parent: Secoma Group
- Website: www.seicomart.co.jp

Seicomart Co., Ltd. (Japanese: 株式会社セイコーマート, Hepburn: Kabushiki-gaisha Seikōmāto), commonly known as Seicomart or Secoma, is a Japanese convenience store chain headquartered in Sapporo, Hokkaido. It is one of the oldest convenience store chains in Japan, with the first store opening in 1971.

The chain is predominant in Hokkaido, and also operates a smaller number of outlets in the Kanto region. Seicomart is known for selling products featuring local Hokkaido produce and offering in-store hot food preparation (such as fried chicken and katsudon under the "HOT CHEF" brand).

== History ==
The company's origin can be traced to a liquor store was opened by the Akao family in Kita-ku, Sapporo. In 1971, influenced by the emerging convenience store model in the United States, the family opened the first Seicomart store on August 10, 1971, in Sapporo, making it one of the earliest convenience store operations in Japan.

The company was formally incorporated in June 1974 as Seicomart Co., Ltd., with Akihiko Akao (赤尾昭彦) as the founder. Under his leadership, the chain grew rapidly in Hokkaido, capitalizing on the limited presence of other national chains in rural areas. Akihiko Akao passed away in 2016 and his successor, Hiroaki Akao, has continued as president.

Seicomart is regarded as the oldest continuously operating convenience store chain in Japan, after Cocostore was acquired by FamilyMart in 2016.

While the chain previously had stores in other regions such as Kyoto, Hyōgo, Shiga, and Tottori (until around 2003), it now focuses primarily on Hokkaido with limited expansion into Ibaraki and Saitama prefecture.

== Operations ==
A Seicomart branch in Yamaki, Hokkaido

Seicomart operates a franchise and company-owned model with an emphasis on regional sourcing. Many products feature Hokkaido dairy, seafood, produce (such as melons and potatoes), and other local specialties. The chain's stores often include HOT CHEF branded in-store kitchens for preparing hot foods, including fried chicken and boxed meals.

As of January 2026, Seicomart has 1,199 stores: 1,098 in Hokkaido and 101 in the Kanto region (92 in Ibaraki Prefecture and 9 in Saitama Prefecture).The chain is part of the broader Secoma Group, which includes private brand development, real estate, and other businesses.
