= OK Mart =

Taiwanese convenience store chain

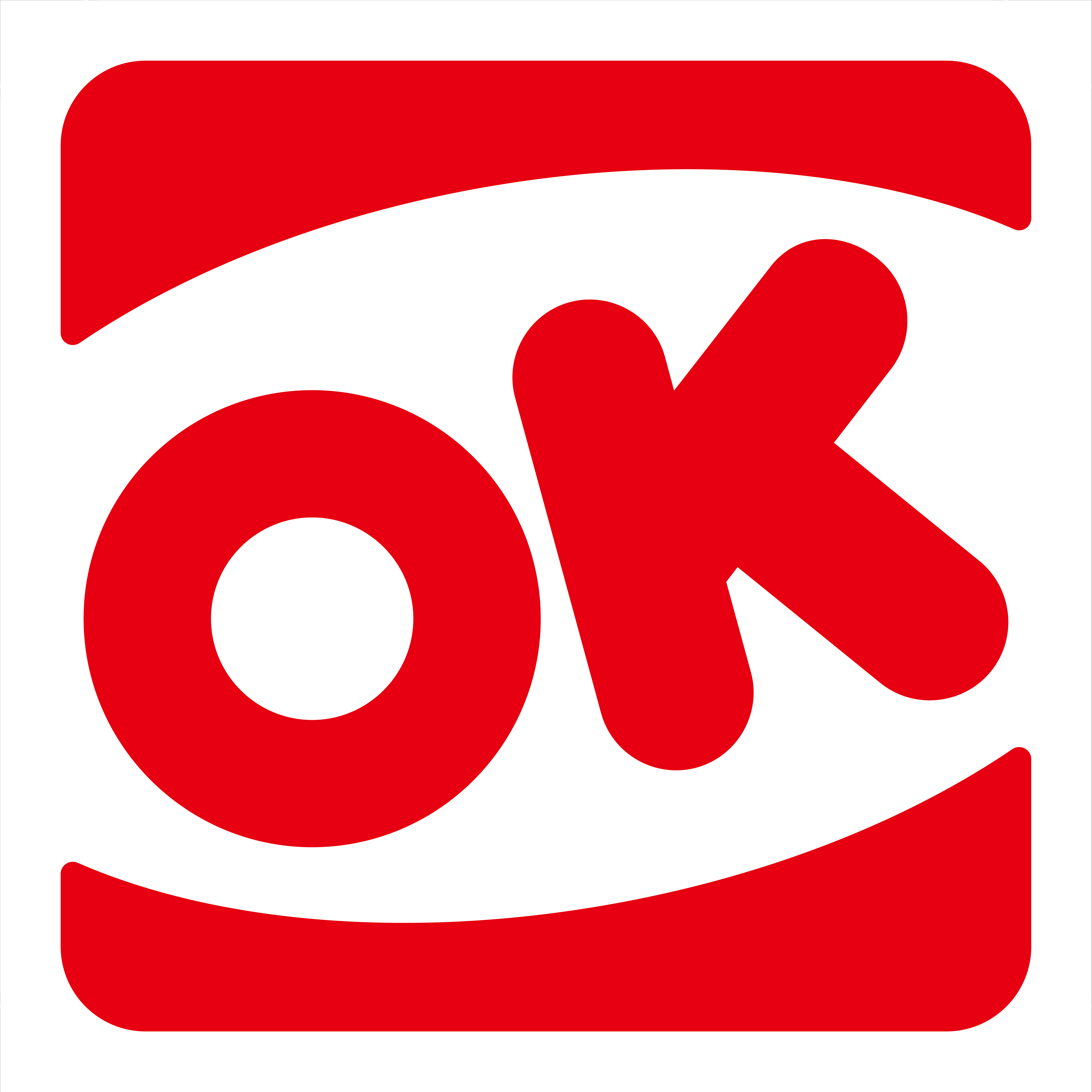

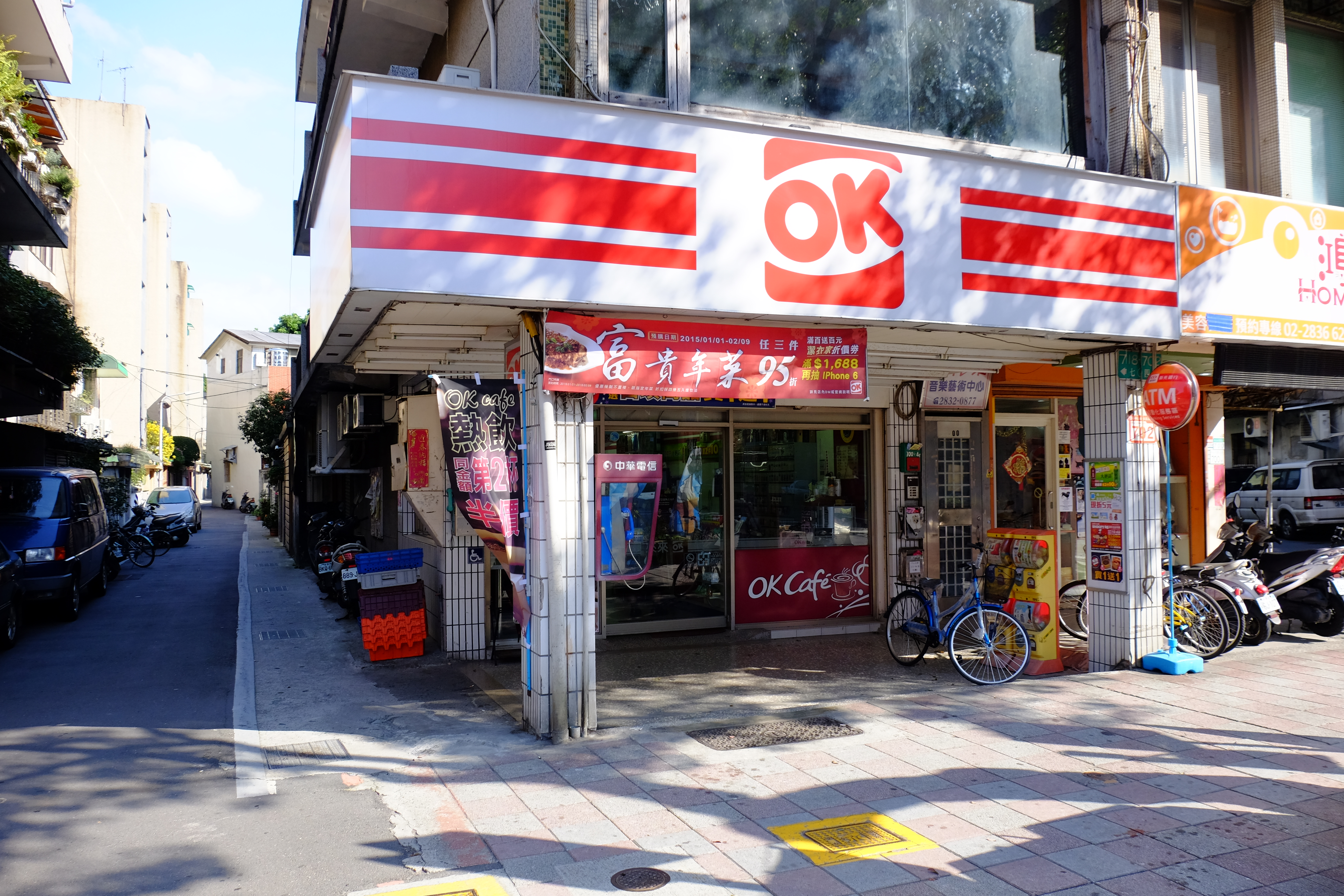
- Trade name: OK Mart
- Type: Joint-stock company
- Industry: Grocery stores, convenience stores, retail
- Founded: 12 May 1988; 38 years ago in Taipei
- Headquarters: No.97, Songde Road, B1 Floor, Xinyi District, Taipei, Taiwan
- Number of locations: 748 (2023)
- Area served: Taiwan
- Website: www.okmart.com.tw

OK Mart is a Taiwanese convenience store chain. It was established in 1988. It is among Taiwan's four largest convenience stores alongside 7-Eleven, FamilyMart, and Hi-Life.
