= Poplar (convenience store) =

Convenience store franchise chain in Japan

Poplar Co., Ltd.

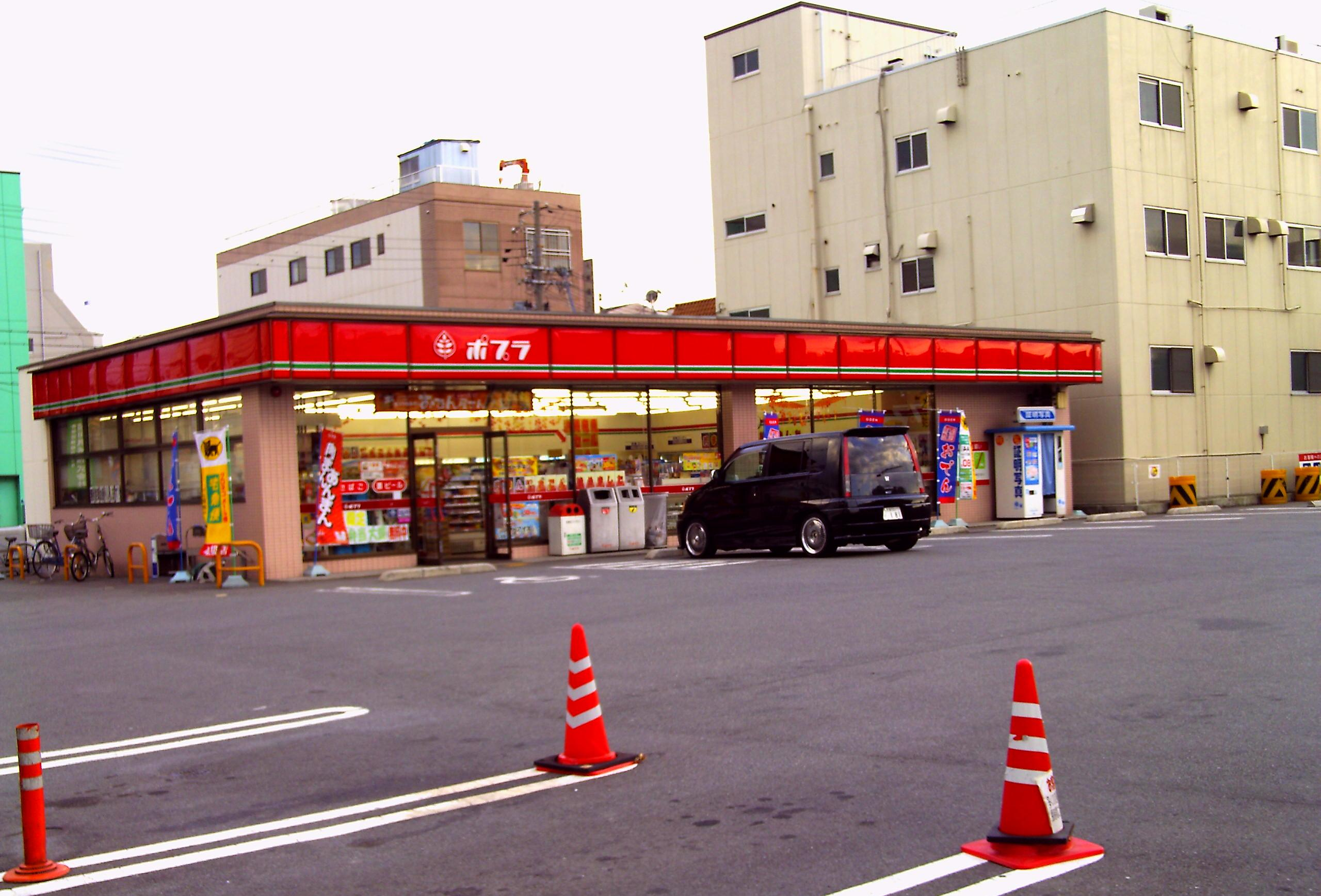
- A Poplar convenience store in Osaka, October 2009
- Native name: 株式会社ポプラ
- Type: Public TYO: 7601
- Industry: Retail (Convenience stores)
- Founded: April 20, 1976
- Headquarters: Asakita-ku, Hiroshima, Japan
- Website: www.poplar-cvs.co.jp

Poplar (株式会社ポプラ, Kabushiki-gaisha Popura) is a convenience store franchise chain in Japan.

There are 269 shops across the Chugoku, Kanto, Kansai, Kyushu, and Shikoku regions.

== History ==
Poplar was founded as a liquor shop in Naka-ku, Hiroshima in 1976. The first Poplar shop was opened in Minami-ku, Hiroshima in 1983. Poplar Foods was established in 1996.
