= Convenience store =

Small store that stocks a range of everyday items

Interior of a Japanese 7-Eleven convenience store (2014)

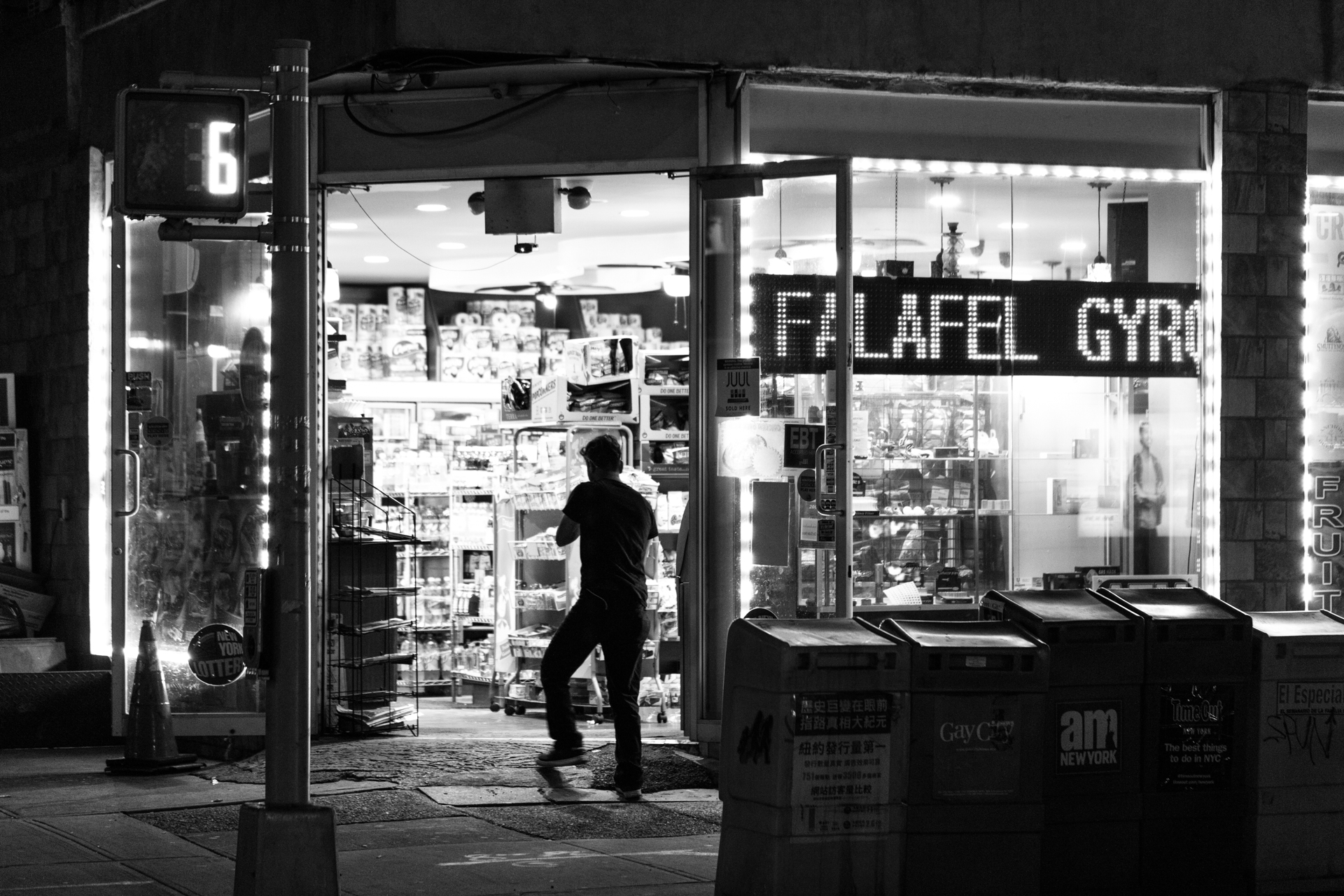
A typical bodega in New York City (2019)

A convenience store is a small retail store that stocks a range of everyday items such as convenience food, groceries, beverages, tobacco products, lottery tickets, over-the-counter drugs, toiletries, newspapers and magazines under one roof.

In some jurisdictions, convenience stores (such as off-licences in the UK) are licensed to sell alcoholic drinks, although many other jurisdictions limit such beverages to those with relatively low alcohol content, like beer and wine. The stores may also offer money order and wire transfer services, along with the use of a fax machine or photocopier for a small per-copy cost. Some also sell tickets or recharge smart cards, e.g. Opus cards in Montreal, Canada, or include a small deli. They differ from general stores and village shops in that they are not in a rural location and are used as a convenient (hence their common name) supplement to larger stores.

A convenience store may be part of a gas/petrol station, so customers can purchase goods while refuelling their vehicles. It may be located alongside a busy road, in an urban area, near a railway or railroad station or other transport hub. In some countries, convenience stores have long shopping hours and some remain open 24 hours.

Convenience stores often charge significantly higher prices than conventional grocery stores or supermarkets, as they buy smaller quantities of inventory at higher per-unit prices from wholesalers. Customers benefit from their longer opening hours, more convenient and greater number of locations and shorter cashier lines.

== Terminology ==
A convenience store may also be called a bodega (New York City), carry-out, cold store, corner shop (chiefly the United Kingdom), corner store (many parts of English-speaking Canada and New England), mini-market, mini-mart, party store (Michigan), deli or milk bar (Australia), dairy (New Zealand), superette (France, New Zealand, parts of Canada, and in parts of the US), a späti (from 'spätkauf' (lit. 'buy-late') in Germany, a bakkal in Turkey, a konbini in Japan, based on the English loanword 'convenience', dépanneur or dep (used in Canada, primarily Quebec, in both English and French; it is a loanword from the French 'troubleshooter').

== Product specialization ==
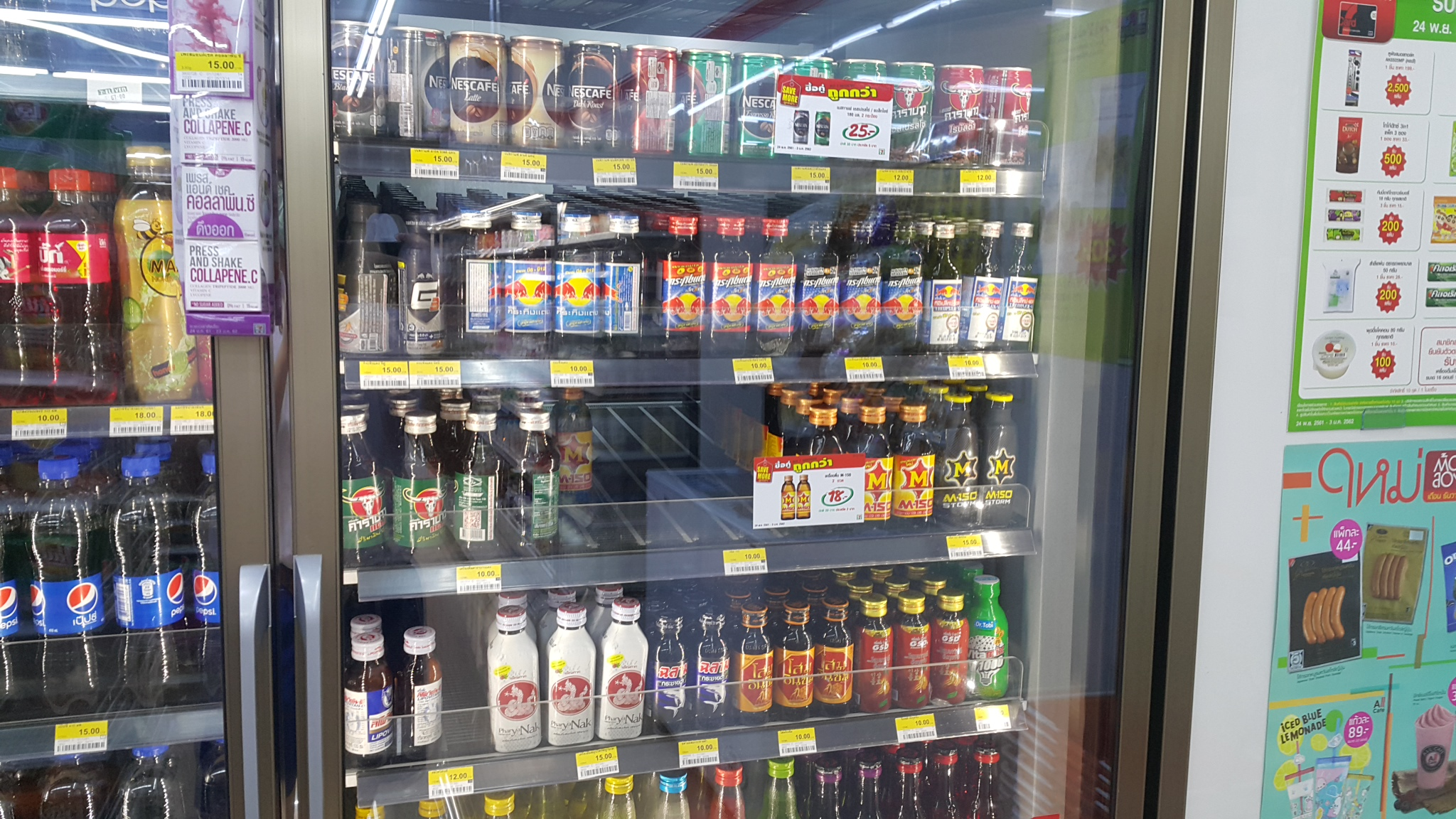
Assortment of energy drinks displayed in a convenience store in Bangkok, Thailand (2018)

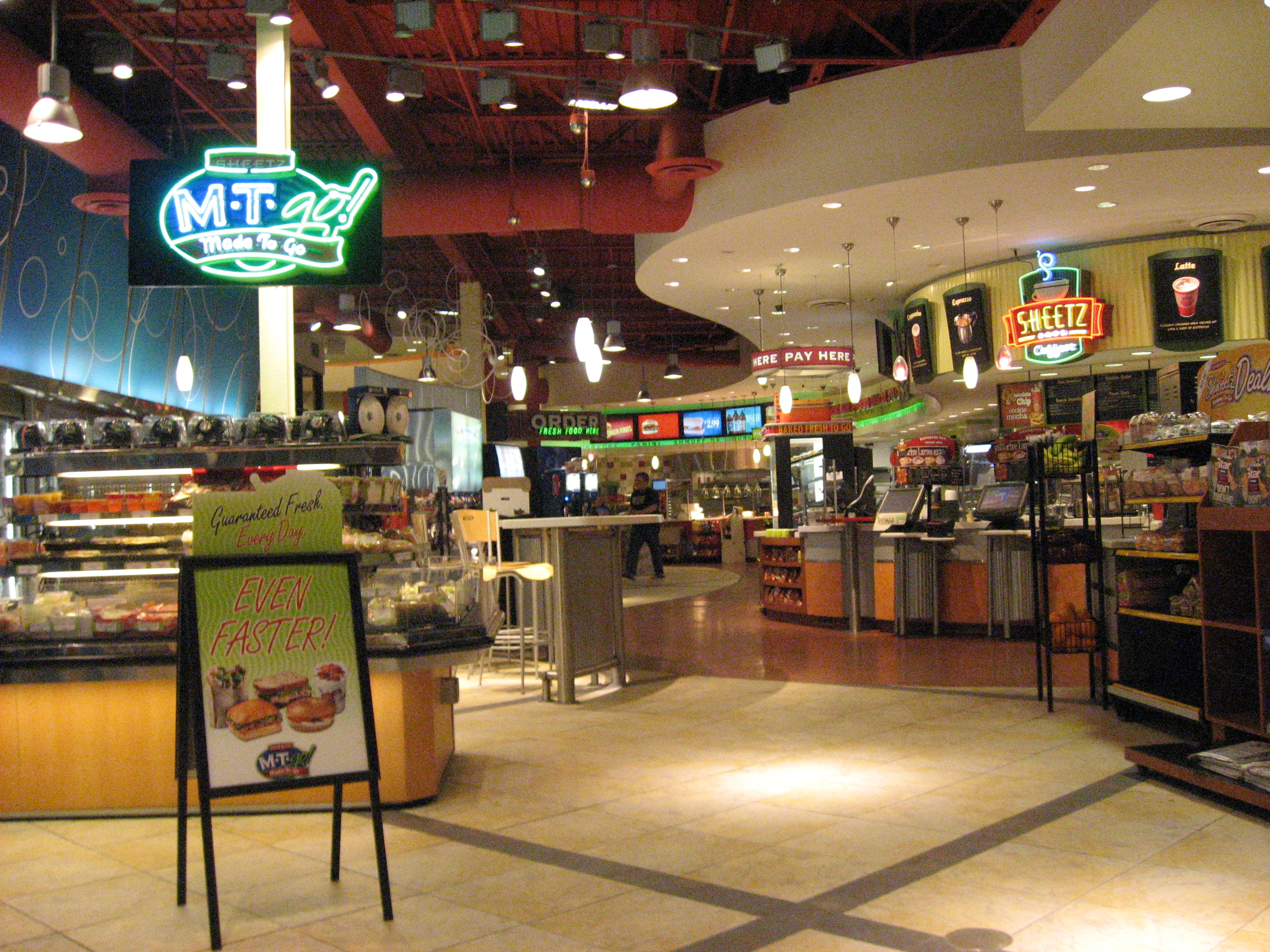
Interior of a Super Sheetz in Altoona, Pennsylvania (2009)

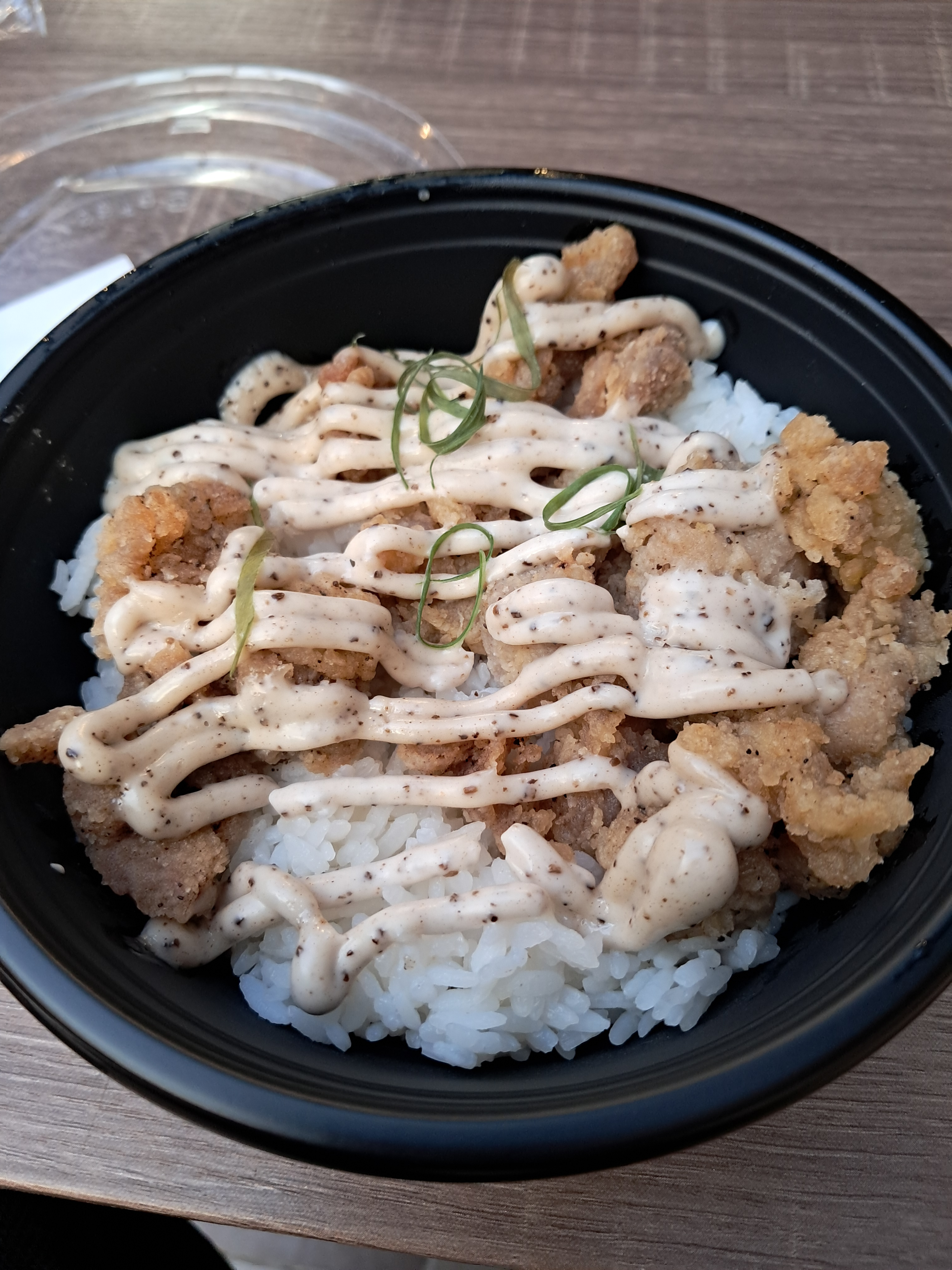
An instant takeout meal from a convenience store in Indonesia (2025)

Various types include, for example, liquor stores (off-licences-offices), mini-markets (mini-marts), general stores or party stores. Typically confectionery (sweets, ice cream, soft drinks), lottery tickets, newspapers and magazines are sold, although merchandise varies widely from store to store. Unless the outlet is a liquor store, the range of alcoholic beverages is likely to be limited (i.e. beer and wine) or non-existent. Most stores sell cigarettes and other tobacco products (e.g. cigarette papers, pipe tobacco, cigars and e-liquid for e-cigarettes). In many North American jurisdictions, tobacco products comprise the greatest portion of gross sales at convenience stores, between 25 percent and 35 percent.

Only food-forward convenience stores invest in their foodservice options to target customers wanting breakfast, dinner, fast food, or pizza. The retail strategy of Wawa, Casey's, Buc-ee's, and Sheetz is considered food-forward. A typical convenience store will sell varying degrees of food and grocery supplies, ranging from household products to prepackaged foods like the triangular British Rail sandwich and frozen burritos. Many convenience shops offer ready-to-eat food, such as breakfast sandwiches and fry-ups. Throughout Europe, it is now common for convenience stores to sell fresh French bread. A process of freezing parbaked bread allows easy shipment and baking in-store. Some shops have a delicatessen counter, offering custom-made sandwiches and baguettes. Others have racks offering fresh delivered or baked doughnuts. Some convenience stores have a self-service microwave oven for heating purchased food.

Fast food items are often available, with stores offering such food either under its owner banner or in partnership with a fast-food chain maintaining a counter in the store. To save space, food is not prepared in the store. Instead, these counters offer a limited menu of items delivered several times a day from a local branch of the restaurant, with items intended to be served hot either kept hot under a warming device or reheated as ordered.

Convenience stores may also sell automobile-related items, such as motor oil, maps and car kits. Often toiletries and other hygiene products are stocked, as well as sanitary products and contraception. They are found near gasoline and train stations, but also can be stand-alone stores. Stores may carry apparel, home furnishings, CDs, and DVDs. Some stores offer money orders and wire transfer services. They may carry small appliances, as well as other household items such as coolers and backpacks. Convenience stores have also been known to carry candles, stationery, artwork, and crockery.

Convenience stores may be combined with other services, such as general stores and pawn shops, a ticket counter for purchasing railway tickets, a post office counter, or gasoline pumps. In Asian countries like Japan or Taiwan, convenience stores are more common because of the higher population density.

Stores often stock fast-moving consumer goods. Items with a high turnover are preferred over items with a lower sales rate. The smaller convenience stores typically have few perishable items because it is not economically viable to rotate perishables frequently with a low number of staff. Smaller convenience stores also do not generate the business needed to sustain food spoilage rates typical of grocery stores or supermarkets.

== Differences from supermarkets ==
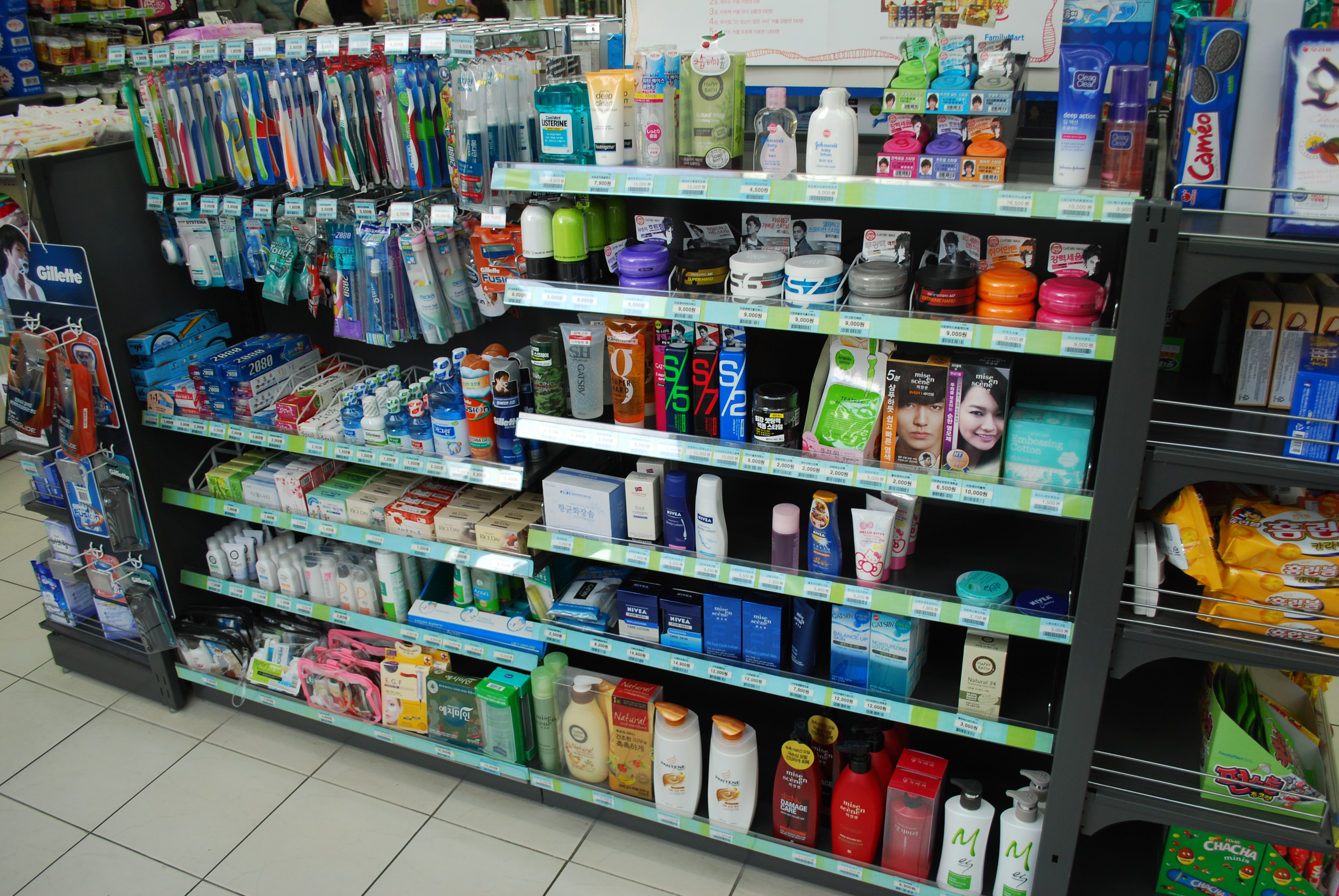
Personal care products at a FamilyMart convenience store in South Korea (2012)

Although larger, newer convenience stores may have a wide range of items, the selection is still limited compared to supermarkets, and in many stores only one or two choices are available. Prices in a convenience store are often higher than those at a supermarket, mass merchandise store or auto supply store, as convenience stores order smaller quantities of inventory at higher per-unit prices from wholesalers. Some convenience stores are similar to corner markets, but often have less variety in food.

Product containers in a convenience store are often smaller with reduced product quantity to allow more products on the store shelves. This reduces the apparent cost differences between full-size packaging in supermarkets. Reduced packaging also reduces waste when a traveller such as a hotel guest does not want to or cannot carry leftover product with them when they depart.

The average U.S. convenience store has a sales area of 2,768 square feet (257.2 m^{2}). New stores average about 2,800 square feet (260 m^{2}) of sales area and about 1,900 square feet (180 m^{2}) of non-sales area—a nod to retailers recognising the importance of creating destinations within the store that require additional space—whether coffee islands, food service areas with seating, or financial services kiosks. Convenience stores have expanded their offerings over the last few years, with stores becoming a part-supermarket, restaurant, gas station and even a bank or drug store.

In the United States, convenience stores are sometimes the only businesses near an interstate highway exit where drivers can buy any kind of food or drink for miles. Most of the profit margin from these stores comes from beer, liquor and cigarettes. Although those three categories themselves usually yield lower margins per item, the sales volume in them generally compensates for it. Profits per item are much higher on deli items (bags of ice, chicken, etc.), but sales are generally lower. In some countries, convenience stores have longer shopping hours, some being open 24 hours.

== By country ==
=== Australia ===
The Australasian Association of Convenience Stores (AACS), the peak body for Australian convenience stores, defines a convenience store as a "retail business with the primary emphasis placed on providing the public with a convenient location to quickly purchase from an array of consumable products, predominantly food and beverages, services as well as petrol." The product mix includes: food to go, beverages, dispensed/barista coffee, snacks (including confectionery), tobacco, basic groceries, ice, petrol and carwash. Stores may offer services such as ATMs, "click & collect", gas bottle exchange, money transfer and lottery tickets. A key feature of convenience stores is their extended hours of operation. Many are open 24 hours a day, seven days a week.

The majority of convenience stores in Australia are small businesses, being either independently owned or operated under franchise or licence agreement. The industry comprises over 6,000 stores and employs well over 40,000 people as of mid-2018. The Australian convenience channel merchandise sales are valued at $8.4 billion (excluding petrol sales) according to the AACS State of the Industry Report 2017. Australia has a flourishing convenience industry with a number of well-known convenience brands including: 7-Eleven, Ampol, NightOwl, EzyMart, BP, APCO, Reddy Express, OTR, Viva Energy, Freedom Fuels and Puma Energy.

=== Canada ===
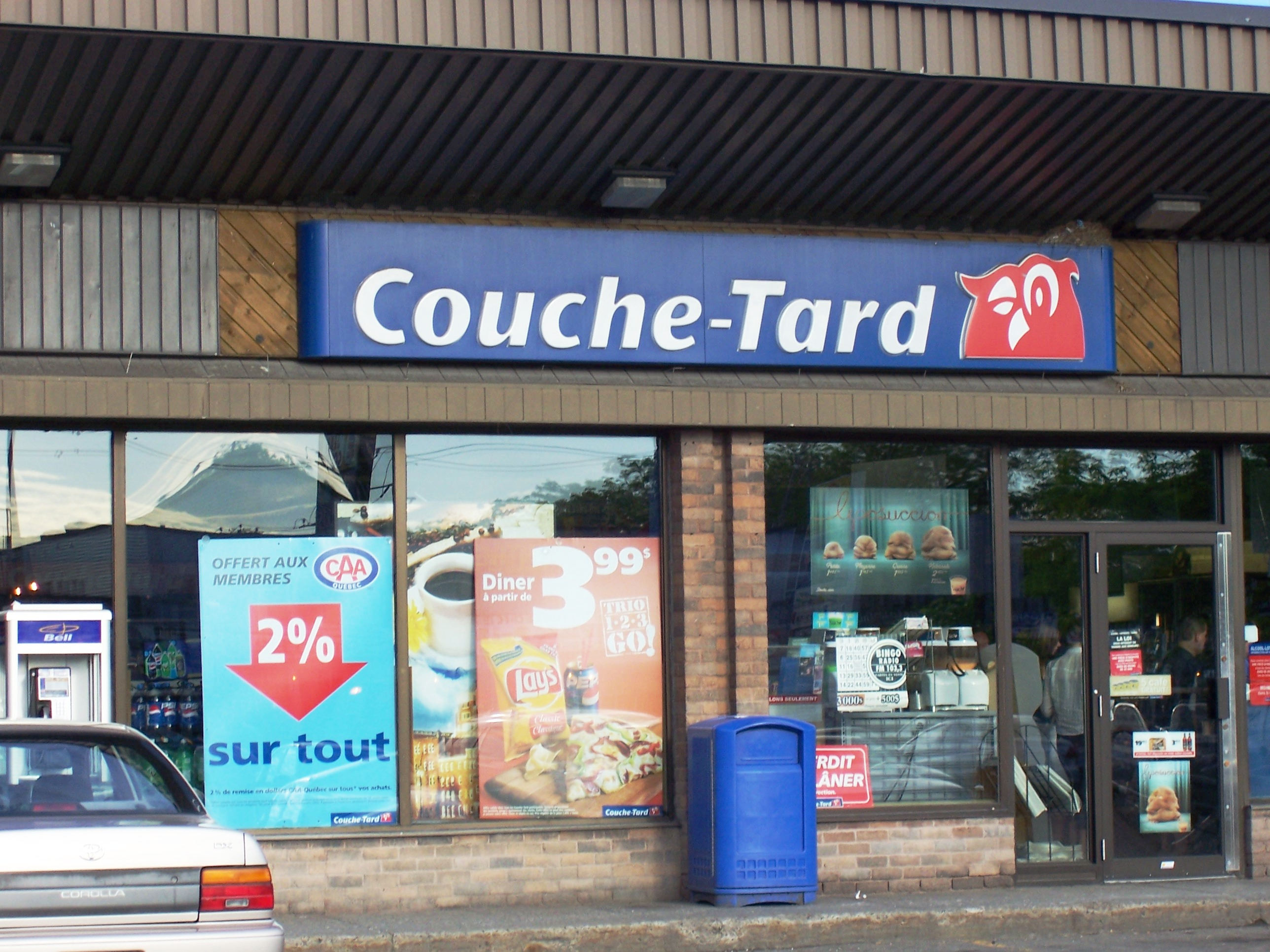
Entrance of a Couche-Tard convenience store in Montreal, Quebec (2006)

Alimentation Couche-Tard Inc., which operates Couche-Tard, Provi-Soir, Dépanneur 7, Circle K, Mac's, Winks, and Becker's, is the largest convenience store chain in Canada and receives its products through Core-Mark International, a North American distribution company specializing in fresh convenience. Another large chain is Quickie Mart (whose name predates the fictitious "Kwik-E-Mart" featured on The Simpsons). The world's largest convenience retailer, 7-Eleven, has about 500 Canadian locations from British Columbia to Ontario. Worldwide, the highest number of the chain's Slurpee beverages are sold in Winnipeg, Manitoba and the city has been awarded the title of the "Slurpee Capital of the World" for many years running. Marketing itself as "more than just a convenience store", there are over 260 Hasty Market locations throughout Ontario and one in British Columbia.

In addition to chain convenience stores, there are also many independently owned convenience stores in Canada.

Convenience stores are also commonly referred to as "corner stores", "mini-marts" or "variety stores" in some regions of Canada. In the French-speaking province of Quebec, a convenience store is known as a dépanneur or "dep" for short, even among some when speaking in English.

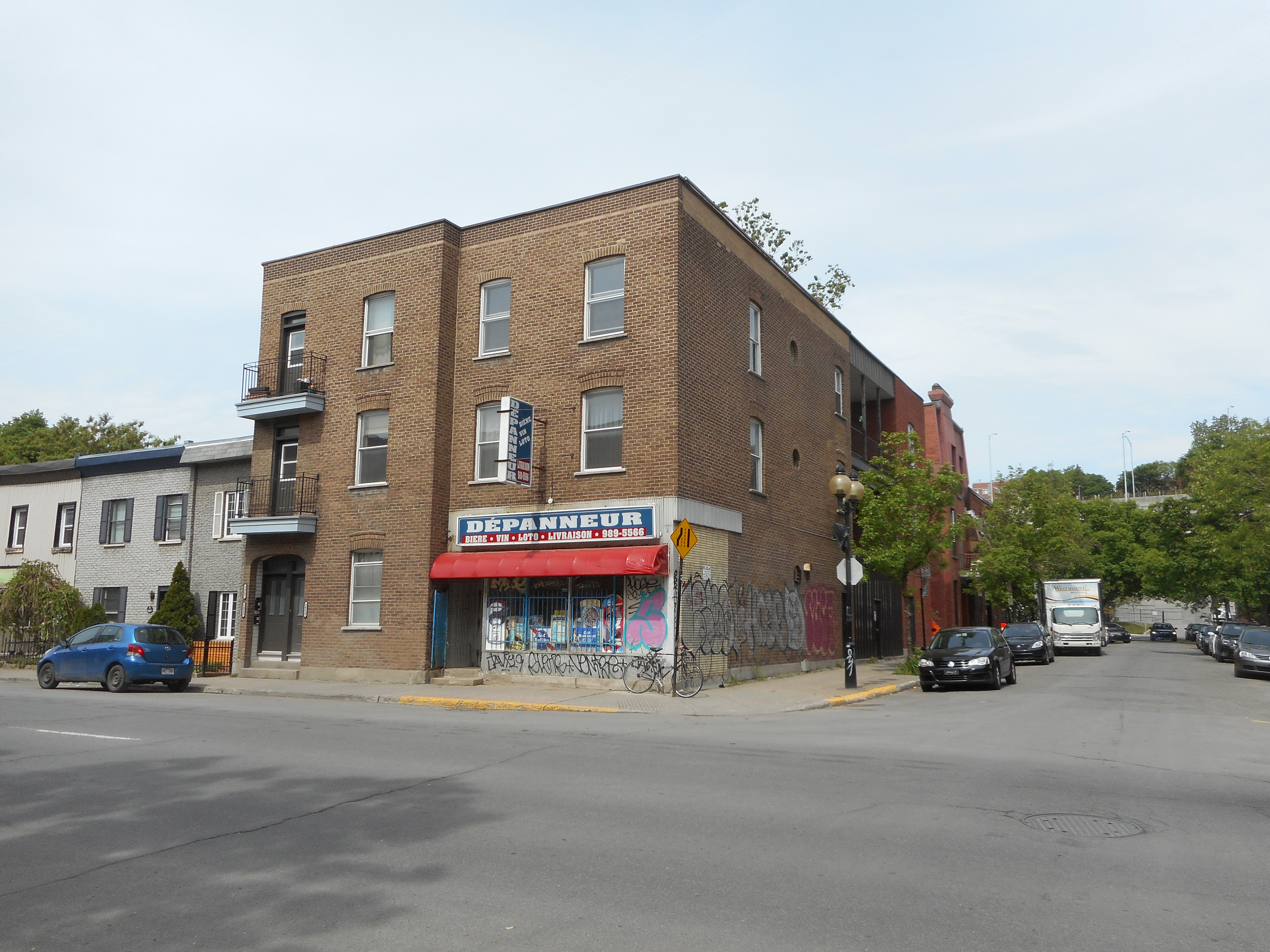
Dépanneurs are a common sight in French-speaking Canada, like this one in Montreal (2016).

=== Chile ===
Chilean convenience stores are typically found at gas stations in most urban and near-urban areas on highways. Examples include Punto/Pronto (owned by Copec), Spacio 1 (Petrobras, formerly called Tigermarket and On The Run before Esso Chile was owned by Petrobras), Va y Ven (Terpel), Upa!, Upita! and Select (from Shell).

Other brands operating mostly in downtowns and middle- to upper-class neighborhoods are Ok! Market (owned by Unimarc), Big John and Oxxo (owned by FEMSA) and some small-scale "minisupermercados" akin to mom-and-pop stores.

=== Costa Rica ===
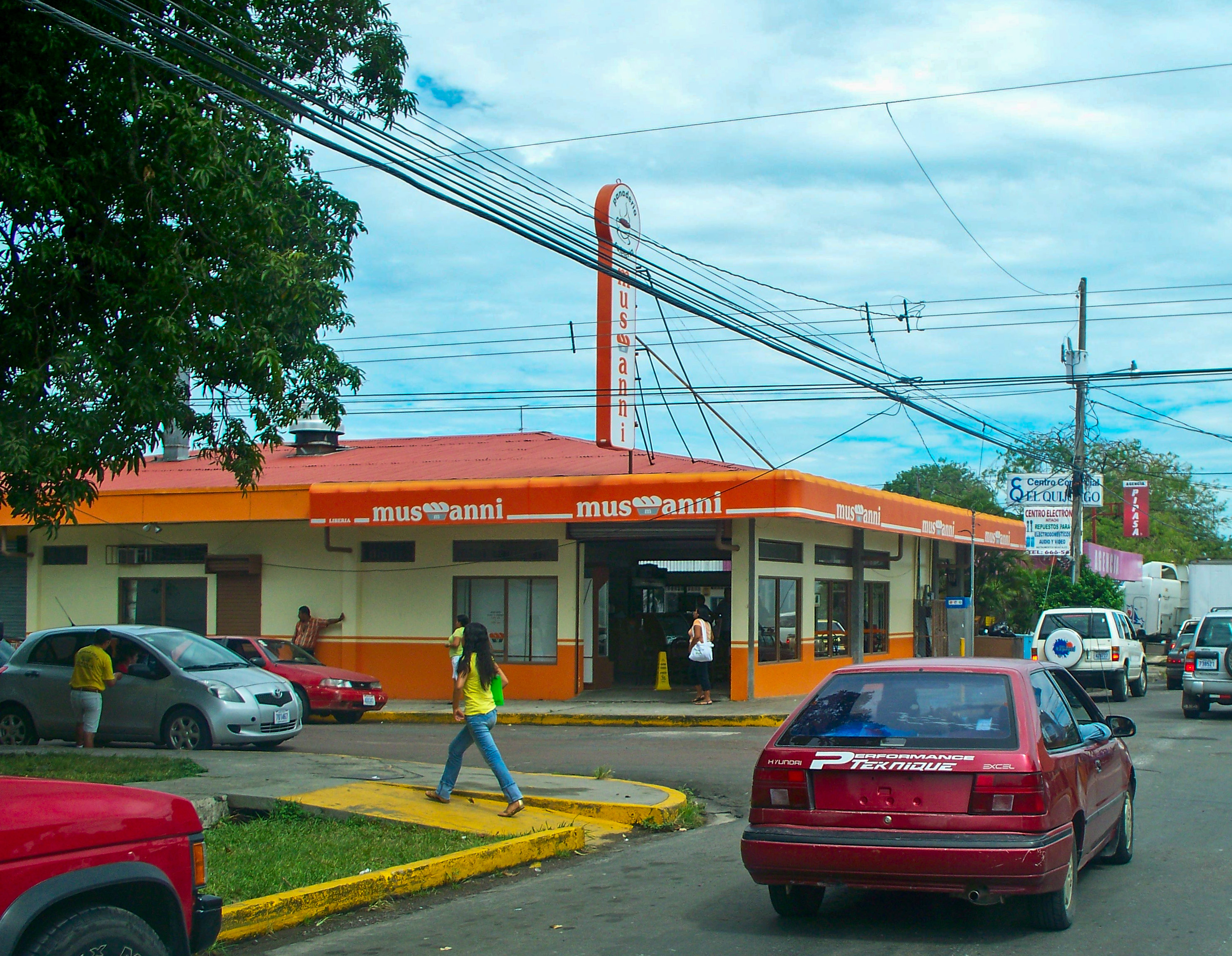
A Musmanni bakery/convenience store in Liberia, Costa Rica

In Costa Rica, family-owned and operated convenience stores called pulperías have been common since the 1900s, and there are many of those stores in every neighbourhood.

In the 2010s, modern convenience stores were introduced, mainly by the U.S.-based ampm company. Competitors launched brands such as Musmanni Mini Super (a chain of bakery stores promoted to convenience stores), Vindi (operated by AutoMercado supermarket company) and Fresh Market (operated by ampm in a format appealing to prosperous neighborhoods).

=== Finland ===
R-Kioski in Helsinki, Finland

In Finland, convenience stores are referred to as kiosks, except for those found inside service stations, which are referred to simply as stores. The biggest convenience store chain is R-Kioski, with over 560 kiosks across the country, which are all franchise-licensed businesses. There are some independent convenience stores that use the word Kymppi or number 10 in their business name, which is reminiscent of a former large convenience store chain called 10-Kioski, which vanished around the early 2000s. Kymppi is a spoken colloquial word for number 10 ("kymmenen") in Finnish.

Smaller Finnish towns often maintain independent kiosks that operate outside the major national retail chains. Convenience stores at service stations are typically run either by the parent oil company, such as Shell, or by one of Finland's two dominant retail groups, Kesko (K‑Group) or S Group. Virtually all staffed service stations in Finland include a small convenience store.

=== France ===
In France chain convenience stores are referred to as supérettes, implying they are mini-supermarkets. Brands include Carrefour City, Casino, Coccimarket, Monop', Franprix, G20, Leader Price Express, Marché Plus, Sherpa, Sitis, Spar, Utile, and Vival (see Magasin de proximité).

Some other, independent convenience shops are referred to as Arabe du coin – (transl. Arab on the corner) due to many Arabic-speaking immigrants from Northwest Africa who work in this sector of the economy. These shops often stay open later than the épiceries or groceries, even on public holidays. Shop owners consider the name improper, especially those who come from other ethnic groups, including Imazighen.

=== Germany ===
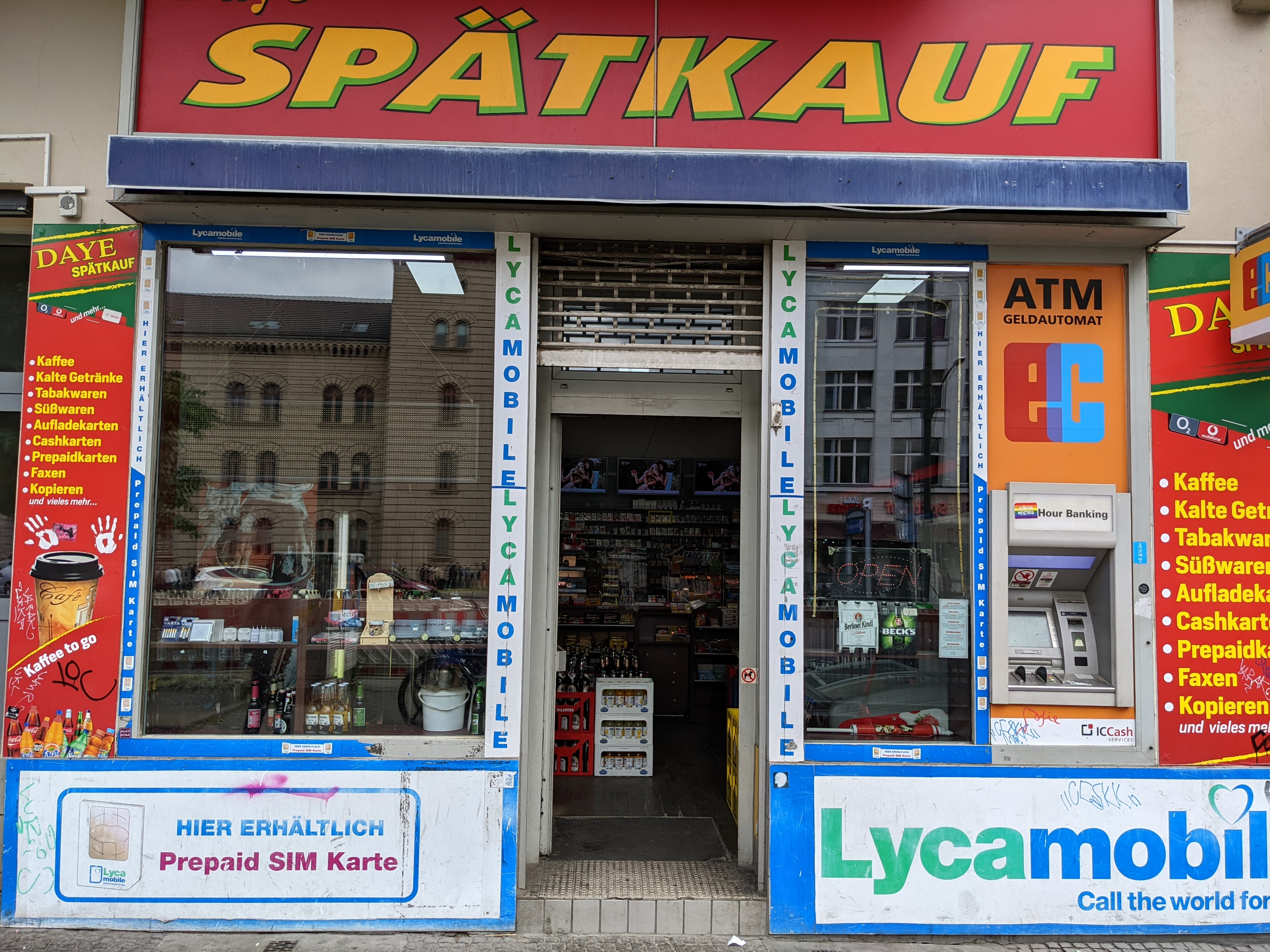
A Späti in Berlin-Kreuzberg

Berliners call the small neighbourhood shops with late opening times found throughout the city (often operated by families with immigrant roots, akin to France) Späti (translating to "Lat(e)y", derived from Spätkauf, "late purchase").

In North Rhine-Westfalia people call the same kind of shop either Kiosk, like the Finnish, (using the word in a way differing from the rest of Germany, where "Kiosk" usually means only stall-like buildings or other very small window-selling shops which are not entered by customers and which sell either newspapers and magazines or snacks and cigarettes, or a combination of these, but no household goods) or Trinkhalle ("drinking hall"), although they are not pubs, as the name might suggest.

A name used for market stalls and also in some regions for little shops is Büdchen (from Bude, "stall, hut, room"); where no special local name for them exists, often just the equivalents of "small shop" or "corner shop" are used ("der kleine Laden/ das Lädchen/ das Lädchen an der Ecke").

Snack shops integrated into petrol stations can also have long opening hours, but in contrast to the neighbourhood Späti-type shops, petrol station shops nowadays are usually part of large retail chains.

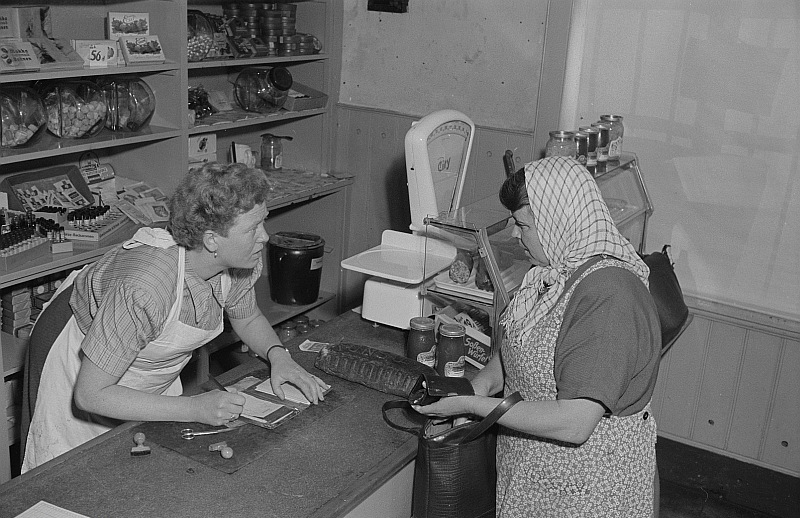
A typical "Tante Emma" working in a shop, 1953

"Tante-Emma-Laden" (aunt-Emma-shop) is used as a nostalgic term for old-fashioned general stores (typically family owned), the historic predecessors of modern discounters and supermarkets which they were replaced by (similar to mom-and-pop stores).

=== Greece ===
New-generation convenience stores in Greece represent a growing retail format that blends elements of traditional mini-markets, kiosks, cafés, and supermarkets. These hybrid stores are typically small to medium-sized and offer a wide range of products and services, often operating 24/7. The model has gained significant popularity in urban areas, particularly in cities like Thessaloniki and Athens, and is expanding nationwide.

Historically, everyday consumer needs in Greece were met by a combination of small kiosks (peripteron), neighborhood grocery stores, and larger supermarket chains. However, changes in urban lifestyles, consumer preferences for convenience, and increased demand for extended operating hours led to the emergence of a new retail model: the multi-purpose convenience store.

These stores typically combine food and beverage retail (snacks, soft drinks, alcohol, cigarettes), coffee and takeaway services, packaged goods and basic groceries, personal care items. Occasionally, services such as parcel pick-up/drop-off or bill payments. Most stores follow a self-service layout, modern branding, and emphasize speed, accessibility, and affordability. Most include in-store coffee stations with branded blends.

The rise of this new retail format is best illustrated by brands such as 4all Stores based in Thessaloniki, now operating over 140 locations across Greece. Combines coffee service, mini-market goods, and convenience store items. Known for aggressive franchising and expansion into Athens.

The Greek convenience retail sector has grown substantially in recent years, both in terms of store count and revenue. According to industry estimates the small-format retail sector reached an estimated €5.15 billion turnover in 2023.

=== India ===
In India, "mom-and-pop" convenience stores are called kirana stores and constitute part of the traditional food retail system. Kirana are typically family-owned stores that operate in fixed locations and carry both basic food and non-food items.

=== Indonesia ===
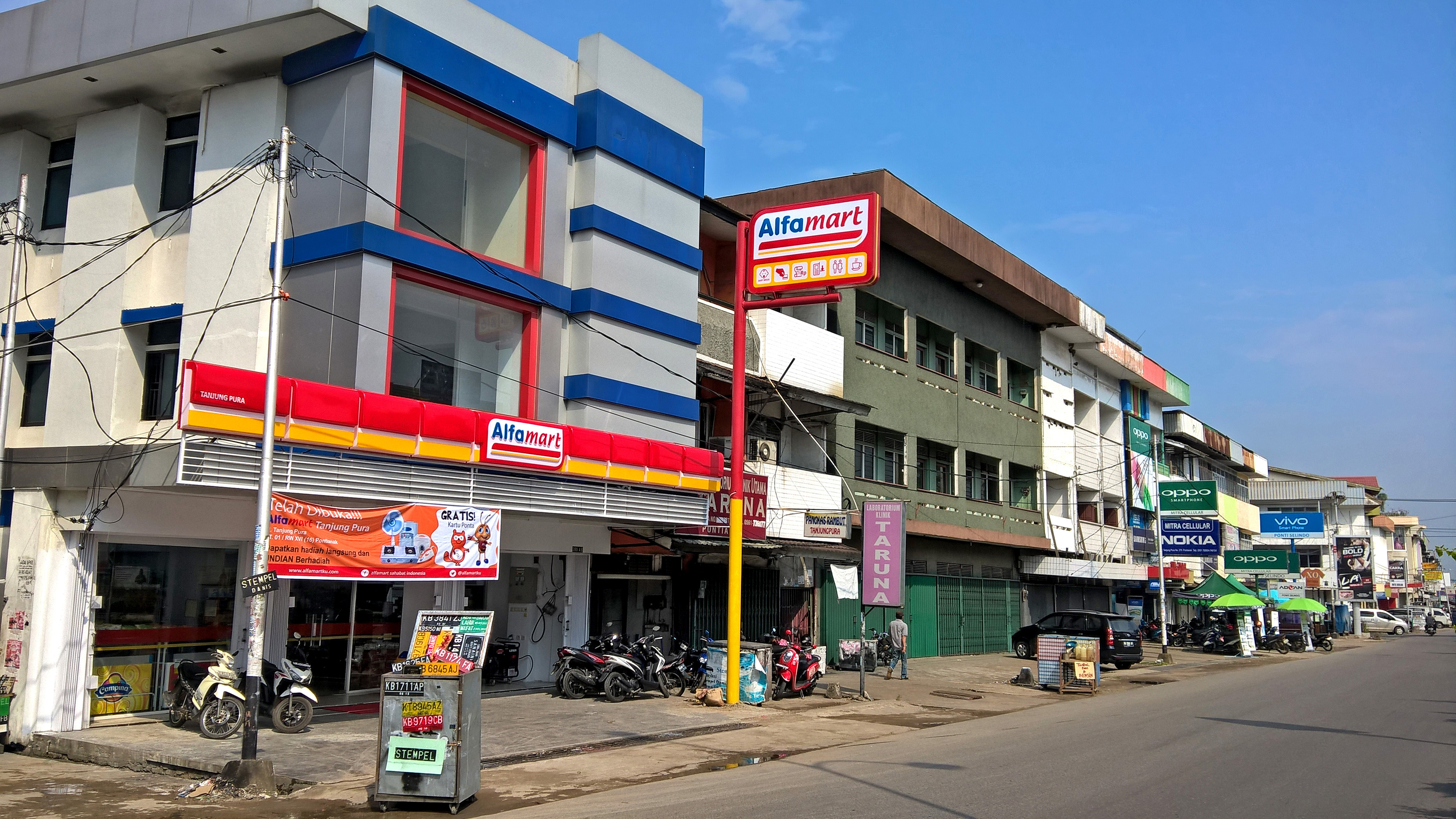
An Alfamart convenience store in Pontianak, Indonesia

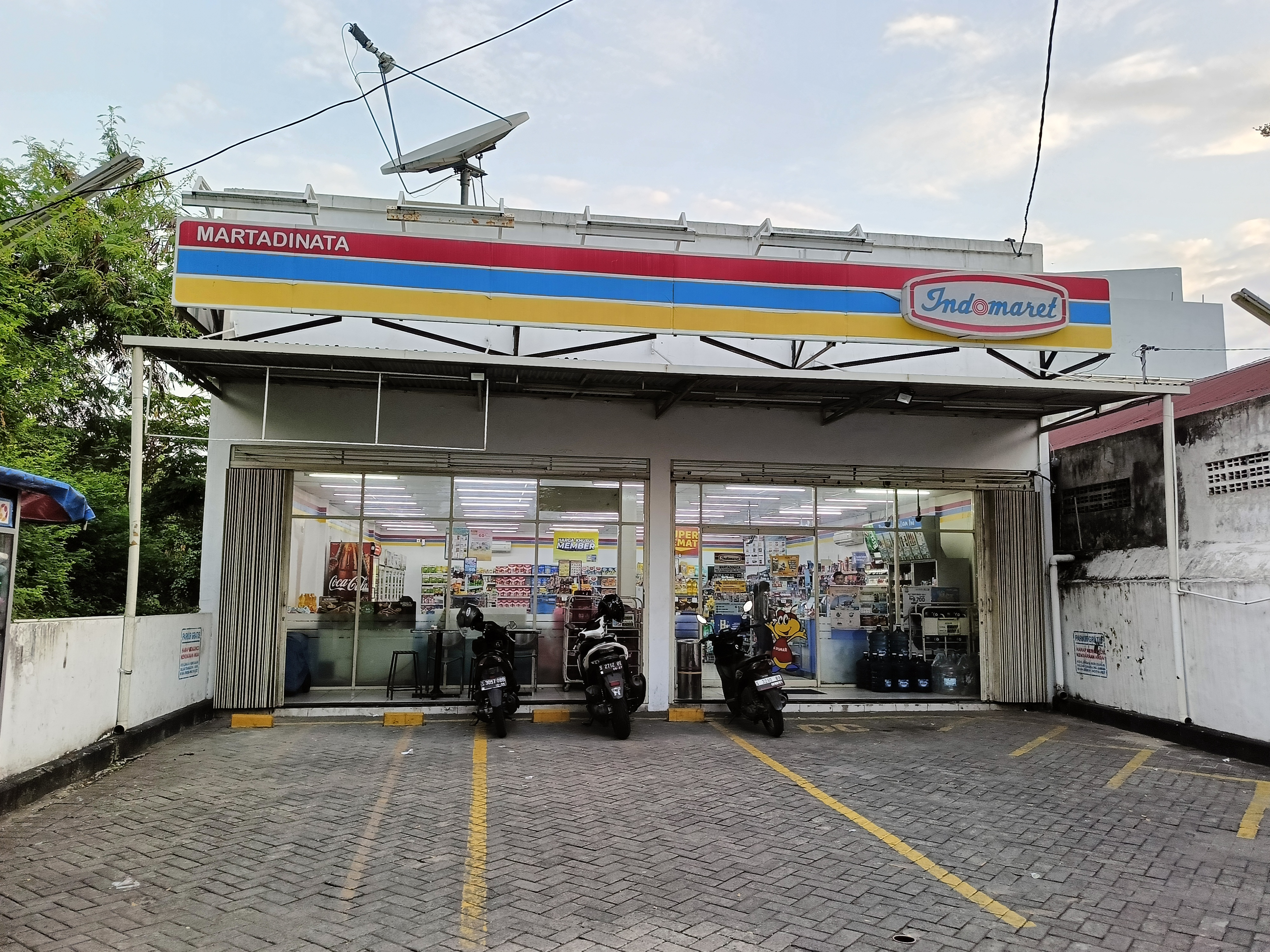
An Indomaret convenience store in Jombang, Indonesia

Supermarket-styled convenience stores in Indonesia (commonly known as "minimarket") are mostly scattered around the towns. Due to local government restrictions in Indonesia, usually convenience stores may only be built at least 500 meters (1,600 ft) from the nearest traditional market. This allows traditional markets to continue selling local goods, but also greatly lowers the opportunities for profit by those who seek to build or own a convenience store by reducing the eligibility of property to be developed into a convenience store. This is especially true in small towns and rural areas. As a result, convenience stores in rural areas are often built side-by-side or at maximum within 50 meters (160 ft) of each other.

The two major national convenience store chains in Indonesia are Indomaret and Alfamart, both of which serve almost all areas within the country with around 22,000 and 18,000 stores in 2023, respectively. Foreign chains like Family Mart, Circle K or Lawson, on the other hand, have their stores in big cities and cater to a specific lifestyle instead of focusing on "convenience". To be classified as a convenience store, the store should occupy no more than 100 square meters (1,100 sq ft) of service area; in some local residences, the limit is 250 square meters (2,700 sq ft).

The Indonesian government also regulates the convenience store license process, so it can only be bought by franchisees, using a different name and different brand, or classifying it as cafeteria. A convenience store with a cafeteria license is only allowed to sell a maximum 10% of its service space for non-food/beverages product. This type of convenience store often puts lawn chairs and a desk as a decoy in front of their stores, while offering the same range of products as a holder of a mini market license.

There are also many small neighborhood stores, known as toko kelontong or warung. Some are sponsored by a network of stores, mostly owned by cigarette companies (such as DRP by Djarum, GGSP by Gudang Garam, KPP by KT&G, or SRC by Sampoerna) or tech companies (such as Mitra Bukalapak or Mitra Tokopedia).

Indomaret and Alfamart itself are also offered as options for online payment methods, offering conveniences of transactions without needing to use internet banking, ATM, or debit and credit cards. Customers will have to select Alfamart or Indomaret as their payment option, and they will have to complete the payment with the store's cashier

=== Israel ===
In Israel, a convenience store is often called a makolet (מכלת). Many convenience stores in Israel are open 24/6, and are closed on Saturday for Shabbat.

=== Japan ===
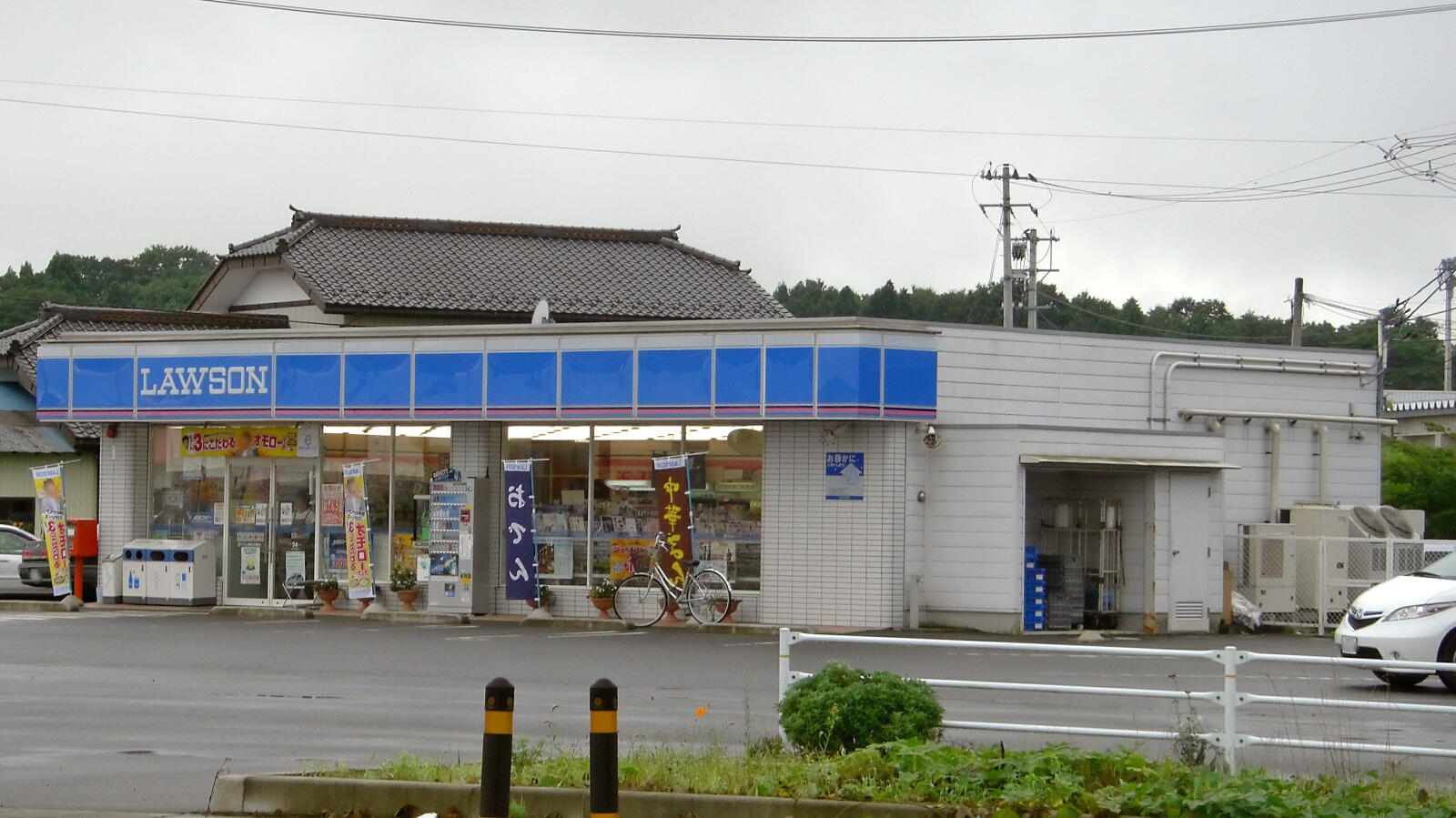
A Lawson convenience store in Minamisoma, Fukushima, Tohoku, Japan

Convenience stores (コンビニエンスストア, konbiniensu sutoa), often shortened to konbini (コンビニ), developed at a tremendous rate in Japan. Seven-Eleven Japan, while struggling to localize their service in the 1970s to 1980s, evolved its point of sale-based business, until ultimately, Seven & I Holdings Co., the parent company of Seven-Eleven Japan, acquired 7-Eleven (US) from Southland Corporation in 1991. The Japanese convenience store chain Ministop operates over 4,500 stores in Asian regions or countries, such as Mainland China, Taiwan, Thailand, and South Korea and is continuously growing.

Convenience stores in Japan rely heavily on the point of sale. Customers' ages and gender, as well as tomorrow's weather forecast, are important data. Stores place all orders online. As store floor space is limited, they must be careful in choosing what brands to sell. In many cases, several stores from the same chain do business in neighboring areas. This strategy makes distribution to each store cheaper, as well as making multiple deliveries per day possible. Generally, food goods are delivered to each store two to five times a day from factories. Since products are delivered as needed, stores do not need large stock areas.

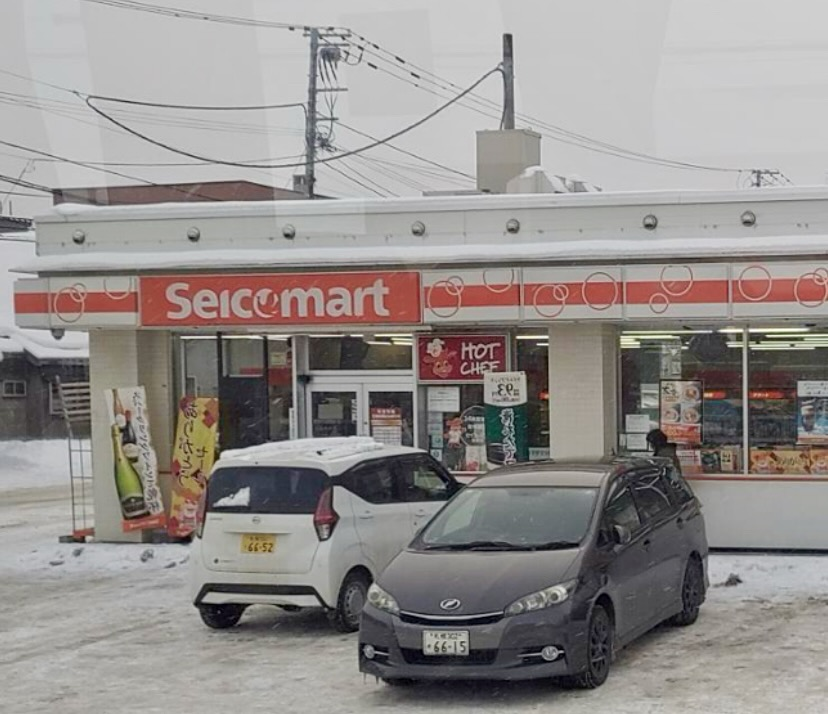
A Seicomart in rural Hokkaido

According to the Japan Franchise Association's data for July 2021, there are 55,931 convenience stores in Japan. 7-Eleven leads the market with 12,467 stores, followed by: Lawson (9,562) and FamilyMart (7,604). Other operators include Circle K Sunkus (acquired by Family Mart in 2016; now defunct), Daily Yamazaki, Ministop, Am/Pm Japan (acquired by Family Mart in 2009; now defunct), Poplar, Cocostore (acquired by Family Mart in 2015; now defunct) and Seicomart. Many items available in larger supermarkets can be found in Japanese convenience stores, though the selection is usually smaller. As well, the following additional services are also commonly available:

- Courier and postal service.
- Photocopying and fax service.
- Automated teller machines.
- Payment service for utilities and other bills and taxes.
- Ticket service for concerts, theme parks, airlines etc.
- Pre-paid cards for cellular phones.

Some stores also sell charging service for electronic money and ATM services for credit card or consumer finance. Items not commonly sold include: Slurpees, lottery tickets, car supplies and gasoline.

Konbini also offer customers the option of making konbini payments (often also referred to as just konbini), an offline payment solution that allows customers without credit or debit cards to make online purchases. A consumer can buy online services or goods, such as video games on Steam or tickets for events. By selecting konbini as payment method at the checkout, the consumer receives a unique transaction code with an expiration date. Depending on the brand (i.e. 7–11 is slightly different from Family Mart), consumers will have to go to any convenience store and finalise the purchase, which can be either at the cashier or at the kiosk. Multiple providers offer konbini as checkout option for foreign companies selling online in Japan, such as Adyen, Degica and Ingenico ePayments.

In 1974, Japan had 1,000 convenience stores. In 1996, Japan had 47,000 convenience stores and the number was increasing by 1,500 annually. Peter Landers of the Associated Press said that the computerised distribution system allows Japanese convenience stores to stock a wider variety of products, allowing them to be more competitive in the marketplace. Because of this technology and the consequent ease of maintaining the right amount of stock, Japan can support one convenience store for every 2,000 people, while in the United States it is one per 8,000 people. Another contributing factor to the widespread proliferation of convenience stores is that, because Japan has a lower crime rate, store owners are not reluctant to keep stores open at late hours in the night and customers are not reluctant to shop during those times.

=== Kazakhstan ===
In Kazakhstan, convenience stores are often referred to as дүкендер (dukender), which translates to "stores" or "shops" in Kazakh. Specifically, convenience stores offering a wide range of groceries and everyday items can be күнделікті тауарлар дүкені (qosymsha dukender), meaning "daily goods store".

Major convenience store chains dominate the retail landscape, offering a wide variety of products such as groceries, beverages, snacks, and household essentials.

=== Malaysia ===
In Malaysia, 7-Eleven is the market leader in convenience shops, with over 2,000 shops. Other convenience shops in the country are myNEWS.com, 99 Speedmart, KK Super Mart, Quick and Easy and MyMart (owned by Mydin). FamilyMart is also found in Malaysia and as of July 2020, has opened its 200th store in Malaysia with the goal of opening 1,000 stores by 2025, bringing the 'konbini' concept to Malaysia.

Convenience stores are very popular among Malaysians, especially urban dwellers in Kuala Lumpur or other populated towns like Penang where the population density is higher. Its 24/7 policy allows Malaysians to have easy access to necessities or as an alternative hang-out area, especially since Malaysians love to go out for midnight supper at mamaks and eateries that also open late at night, as more and more Malaysians are beginning to work or go out late. The availability of fresh hot food or cold premade food is popular among young workers with less time to prepare food for themselves, as many have irregular work hours, especially in the city. It also eases the burden of families. Many Malaysians also enjoy the seasonal food that these stores provide. These stores can be found almost anywhere, especially in areas with a higher population density, such as city centres, condominiums, apartment complexes, office areas, residential areas, shop lots and petrol stations, although the store density is as high as Taiwan or Japan.

Items sold at such convenience shops usually range from pre-made local food like nasi lemak, onigiri, buns, snacks, toiletries, drinks, a limited amount of alcohol, newspapers, magazines, slushies, cup noodles, ice cream, hot food, oden, game reload and mobile top up cards. Some also have the service of reloading Touch N' Go cards or ATMs. Most have a microwave oven and hot water boiler to heat food. Some have seasonal and limited food, desserts or special imported products and items, like FamilyMart importing strawberry Coca-Cola from Japan.

Malaysia has sundry shops that sell daily items and perishables at lower prices, but unlike convenience shops, they are not open 24/7. Some of these sundry shops also sell traditional herbs and ingredients.

=== Mexico ===
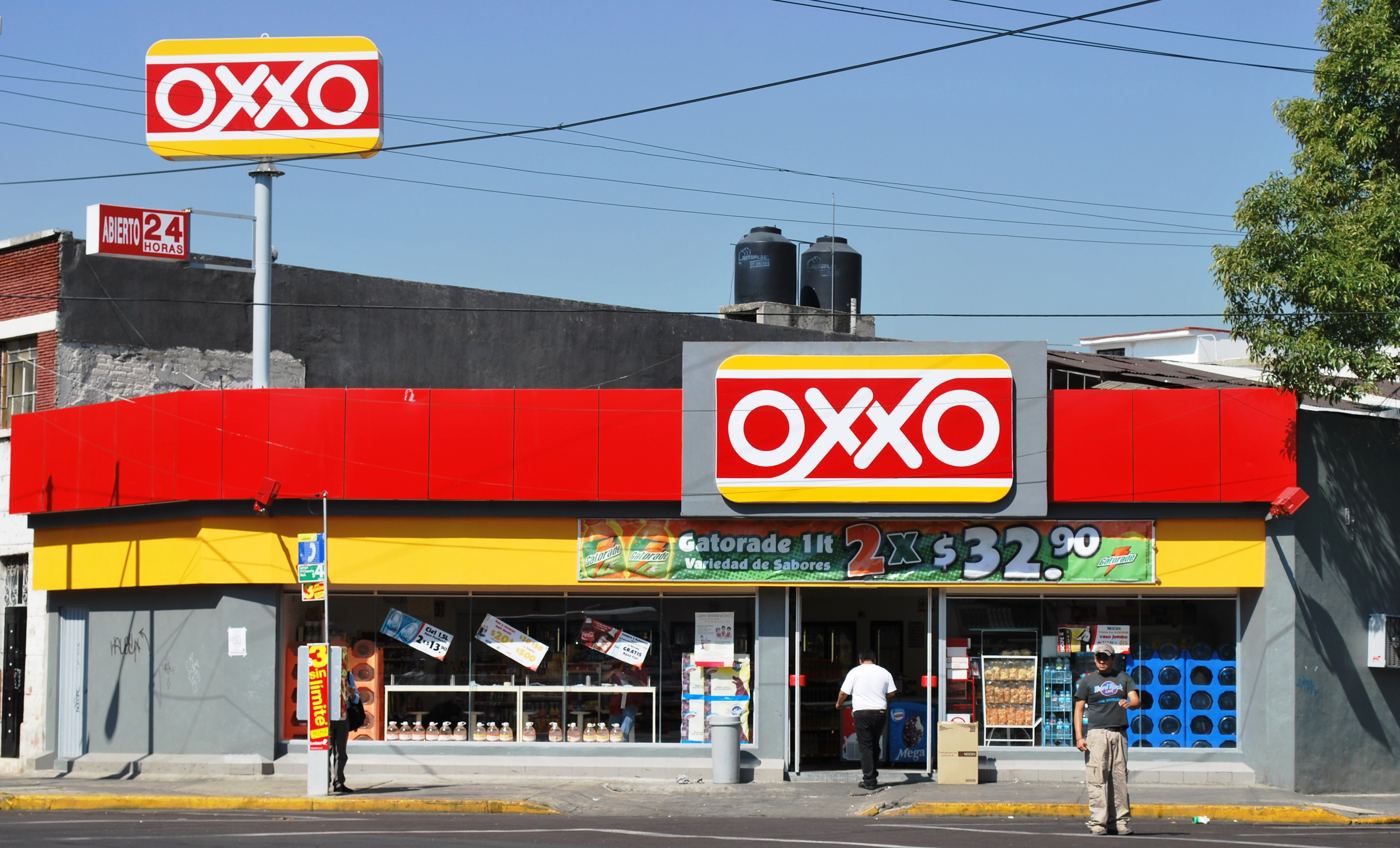
An Oxxo store

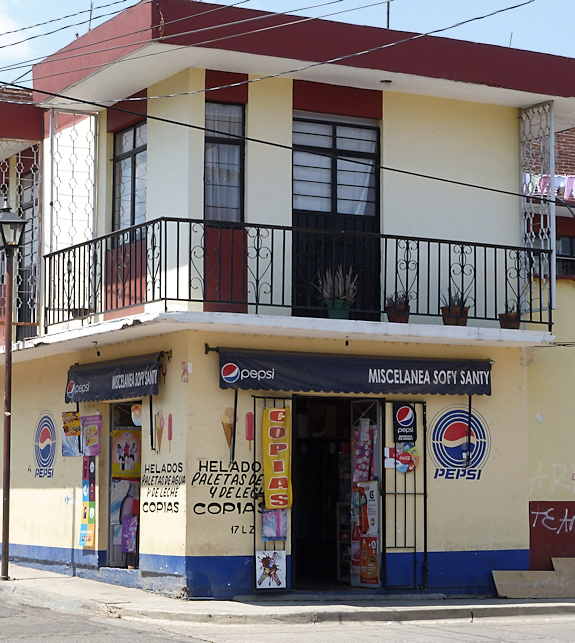
A family-run Miscelánea

Oxxo is the largest chain in the country, with more than 15,000 stores around the country. Other convenience stores, such as Tiendas Extra, 7-Eleven, SuperCity, ampm, and Circle K, are also found in Mexico. The first convenience store in the country, Super 7 (now a 7-Eleven), was opened in 1976 in Monterrey, Nuevo León. There are also some regional chains, like Amigo Express and CB Mas, that operate in Comarca Lagunera, Super Q and El Matador in Queretaro, Coyote in central Mexico, Kiosko in Colima and some locations in nearby states, and JV in northeastern Mexico. Stores sell fast food like coffee, hot dogs, nachos and prepaid cellphones between MXN$20 and MXN$500, mainly Telcel and Movistar, newspapers, magazines, and Panini products and other novelties.

Misceláneas (literally meaning "place where miscellaneous items are sold" and otherwise called tiendas de abarrotes (grocery store) in some parts of the country) are smaller, family-run convenience stores often found in central and southern Mexico. They operate in many locations, from rural communities to suburban residential neighborhoods, usually located in front of or below the family's residence. They often fulfill the role of neighborhood meeting points and places to disseminate community news. While offering a more limited, and sometimes varied, assortment of items than corporate chains, they fill a void in areas where corporations do not operate. Usually they sell homemade snacks such as tortas and sandwiches, made by the owners. They also provide items in smaller quantities than would be offered for sale in larger stores and markets; for example, selling single cigarettes along with full packs.

=== Mongolia ===
In Mongolia, convenience shops (CU, Circle K etc.) are already common and continue to gain popularity, making the market increasingly saturated with retailers. Currently, CU is the market leader, with the largest number of stores and the highest reputation among customers.

=== New Zealand ===
In New Zealand, convenience shops are commonly referred to as dairies and superettes. Dairies in New Zealand are generally independently owned and operated. The use of the term dairy to describe convenience shops was common in New Zealand by the late 1930s. Dairies carved out a niche in food retail by keeping longer trading hours than groceries and supermarkets – dairies were exempt from labour laws restricting trading hours and Saturday trading. With the deregulation of trading hours and in the wake of legislation in 1989 prohibiting sales of alcohol by dairies, the distinction between dairies, superettes and groceries has blurred.

=== Peru ===
Convenience stores in Peru are typically independent corner stores called "bodegas" that include groceries, alcohol, services and phone booths. Other convenience stores are found at gas stations in urban and connecting areas on highways; examples include Listo! (owned by Primax) and Repshop (Repsol). Recently, Tambo+, owned by Corporación Lindley S.A., has quickly become the biggest convenience store in the country with 300 stores opened in just two years. Mexican-owned Oxxo has plans to expand to Peru.

=== Poland ===
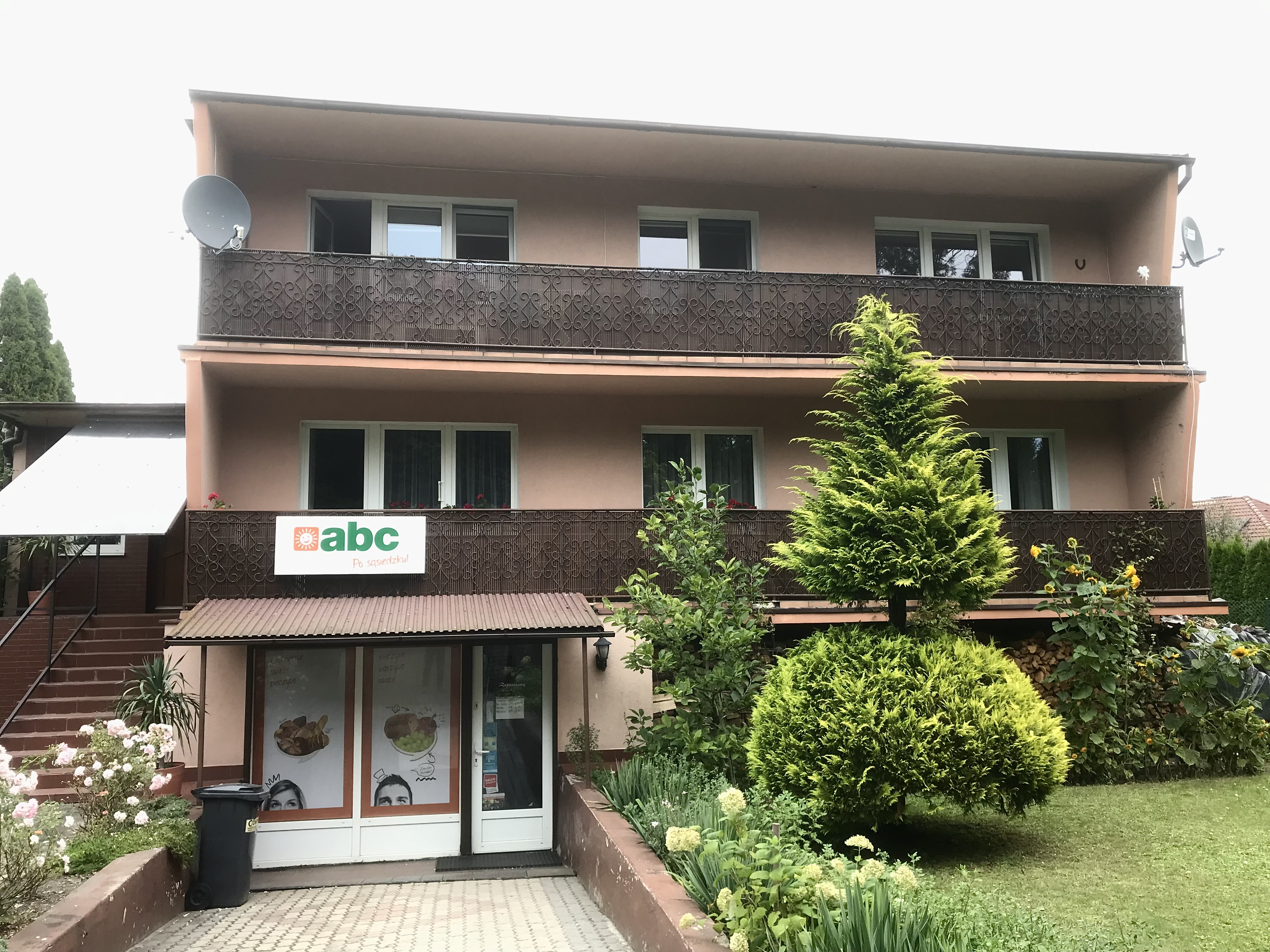
An ABC convenience store located in the Kocievian village of Nicponia, Poland, 2024

Żabka is one of the largest convenience stores in Poland. In 2022 Jarosław Kaczyński, leader of the Law and Justice party, said that the Polish ruling government might buy Żabka convenience store from CVC Capital Partners.

=== Philippines ===
There is a local version of convenience store in the Philippines, called the sari-sari store, that is located on almost every street, corner, residential area, and other public places around the country.

Aside from local convenience stores, other popular international convenience stores are present on almost every street, especially in urban areas. 7-Eleven is the largest convenience store chain in the country. It is run by the Philippine Seven Corporation (PSC). Its first store, located in Quezon City, opened in 1984, and has now approximately 2,285 branches.

There are also many branches of Uncle John's, operated by Robinsons Convenience Stores, Inc.; FamilyMart, operated and franchised by Udenna Corporation; and All Day Convenience Store, owned by Filipino entrepreneur and former Philippine Senator, Manny Villar. Lawson, Circle-K and Alfamart have also opened stores in the country.

Local convenience stores similar to 7-Eleven also exists in the Philippines, such as Davao Central Convenience Store, concentrated the Davao Region in Mindanao. Operated and owned by the Yap family of the Felcris Group of Companies, it has 198 branches (120 in Davao City alone) operated in the island as of July 2026.

=== Russia ===
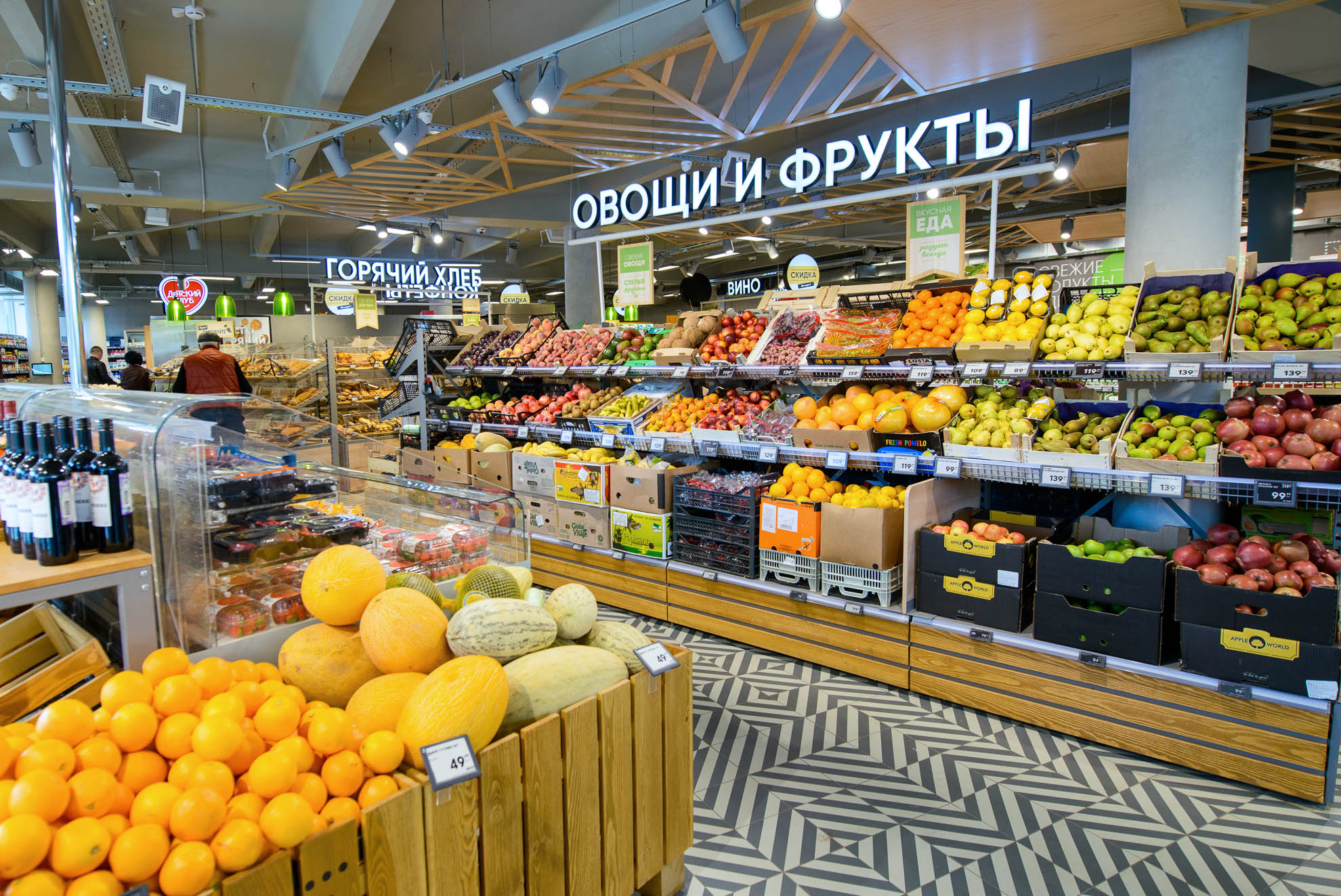
A typical Pyatyorochka store interior

Major brands of convenience stores in Russia are Pyatyorochka ("little 5") with over 10,000 shops functioning, Monetka ("little coin"), "Magnit u doma", "Krasnoe i Beloe" and Diksi. However, Russians may occasionally use the word "supermarket": various convenience store chains used to position themselves as "supermarkets" throughout the 1990s, such as now closed "Sed'moy Kontinent" ("the 7th Continent") company.

Pyatyorochka stores have self-checkout tills, as do Perekryostok stores. Both brands belong to X5 Group and have a mutually compatible "club card". However, many discounts/sales in both stores require buyers to have "loyalty cards" to get discounts.

=== Singapore ===
Major convenience shops in Singapore are 7-Eleven owned by Dairy Farm International Holdings and Cheers owned by NTUC Fairprice. Figures from the Singapore Department of Statistics showed that there are 338 7-Eleven shops and 91 Cheers outlets in 2004. Other convenience shops such as Myshop and One Plus appeared in 1983. Myshop belongs to a Japanese company, and One Plus belongs to Emporium Holdings.

Various reasons unique to Singapore have been given for the popularity of convenience shops. Convenience shops sell a wide range of imported goods, whereas minimarts and provision shops sell local products with a limited range of non-Asian products. Convenience shops are situated within housing estates, thus reducing consumers' travel time. Most families in Singapore are dual-income families. Since both spouses work, there is greater need for convenience in shopping for daily necessities. The 24-hour opening policy allows convenience shops to reach out to a larger group of consumers. First, the policy caters to the shopping needs of consumers who work shifts or have irregular working hours. Secondly, the policy caters to the increasing number of Singaporeans who keep late hours. A 2005 economic review by PwC reported that 54% of Singaporeans stayed up past midnight.

==== 7-Eleven ====
A 7-Eleven shop under a block of flats

7-Eleven began the trend of convenience shops in Singapore when it opened its first shop in 1982 by Jardines, under a franchise agreement with Southland Corporation of the United States. Dairy Farm International Holdings acquired the chain from Jardines in 1989.

The number of 7-Eleven outlets continued to increase in 1984 while other chains were having difficulty expanding. One Plus was unable to expand due to the shortage of good sites. The original owners of the Myshop franchise, which had seven outlets, sold out to one of its suppliers due to a lack of demand.

In 1985, 7-Eleven faced difficulty in finding favourable locations and failed to meet its one-shop-a-month target. The situation improved in 1986 with a new Housing & Development Board (HDB) tendering system, which allowed 7-Eleven to secure shops without having to bid too high a price. 7-Eleven shops are open 24 hours a day, seven days a week, including Sundays and public holidays. This 24/7 policy was seen as the reason that gave 7-Eleven its edge over its competitors.

In 1990, there was a rise in the number of shop thefts in 7-Eleven. The shoplifters were usually teenagers who stole small items such as chocolates, cigarettes and beer. In response to the increase in the number of thefts, 7-Eleven stepped up security measures, which successfully lowered the crime rate by 60%.

==== Cheers ====
Notice posted at Cheers to deter robbery

Started in 1999, Cheers is owned by local corporation NTUC FairPrice. Cheers has adopted 7-Eleven's 24/7 model and taken similar security measures to prevent cases of shoplifting. Convenience shop owners seeking franchising seem to prefer Cheers over 7-Eleven, probably due to its cheaper franchise fee.

=== South Africa ===
South Africa has a variety of convenience stores owned by major supermarket chains, and partnered with gas station brands. Some, like FreshStop, use the distribution centers of their parent companies. FreshStop is SA's oldest and largest convenience store chain, having opened in 2009, and having reached a total of 330 locations in November 2025.

South African convenience store brands include FreshStop (owned by Food Lover's Market and partnered with Astron Energy), Pick n Pay Express (owned by Pick n Pay and partnered with BP), Woolworths FoodStop (owned by Woolworths and partnered with Engen), Spar express (owned by Spar and partnered with Shell), and OK Express (owned by Shoprite and partnered with Sasol, Puma and Total.

=== South Korea ===
Convenience stores in the Republic of Korea date to 1982, when Lotte opened a store in Seoul. Stores saw growth after the 1988 Summer Olympics with the first 7-Eleven, and even since the 2010s where department stores and marts have struggled. As of the end of 2023, there are about 55,000 convenience stores in South Korea, and in Seoul, it has increased by about four times compared to 15 years ago as of 2021, expanding to the extent that almost every street has convenience stores. As of 2024, CU and GS25 are competing for the first or second place in market share with a slight gap in sales and number of stores, followed by 7-Eleven.

Convenience stores in South Korea expanded quickly as the country experienced fast social change and a mix of traditional and modern lifestyles. Their growth was also supported by higher demand for ready-to-eat meals and more frequent use of these stores by younger consumers. Their growth was also supported by changes in consumer behavior in South Korea, especially as people adjusted their shopping habits in response to social and economic pressures.

=== Taiwan ===
Boasting more than 10,000 convenience stores in an area of 35,980 km^{2} and a population of 23 million, Taiwan has the Asia Pacific's and the world's second highest density of convenience stores per person after South Korea: one store per 2,065 people. With 4,665 7-Eleven stores, Taiwan also has the world's highest density of 7-Elevens per person: one store per 4,930 people. In Taipei, it is not unusual to see two 7-Elevens across the street or several of them within a few hundred meters of each other.

Taiwan's second largest convenience store chain is FamilyMart, with more than 3,000 locations. Also competing for customers are Hi-Life, a Taiwanese chain, and OK Mart, a local version of Circle K.

Because they are found everywhere, convenience stores in Taiwan provide services on behalf of financial institutions and government agencies, such as collection of city parking fees, utility bills, traffic violation fines, and credit card payments. Eighty percent of urban household shoppers in Taiwan visit a convenience store each week.

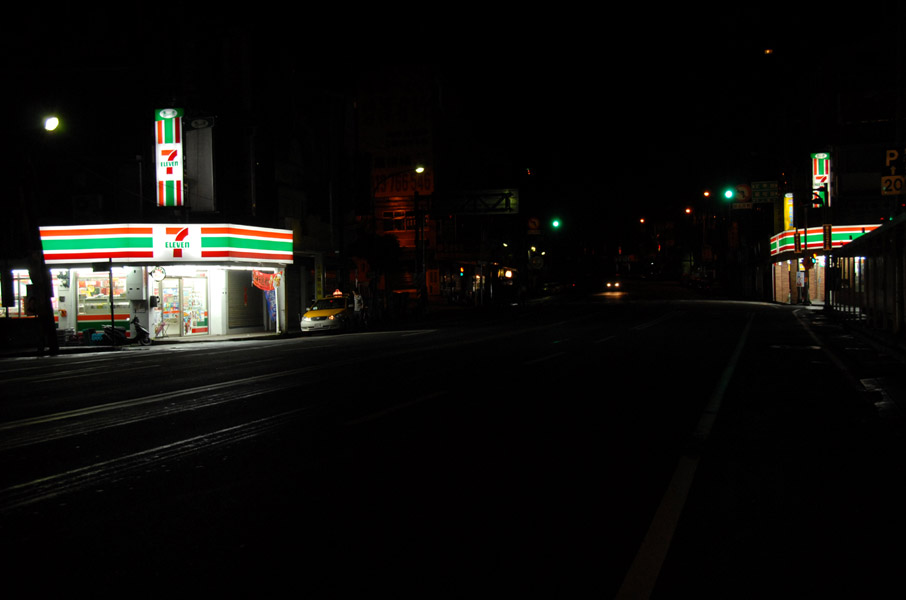
With the highest 7-Eleven outlet density in the world, it is not unusual for two 7-Eleven shops to stand face-to-face near the same intersection in Taiwan. The distance between them might be less than 50 meters (160 ft).

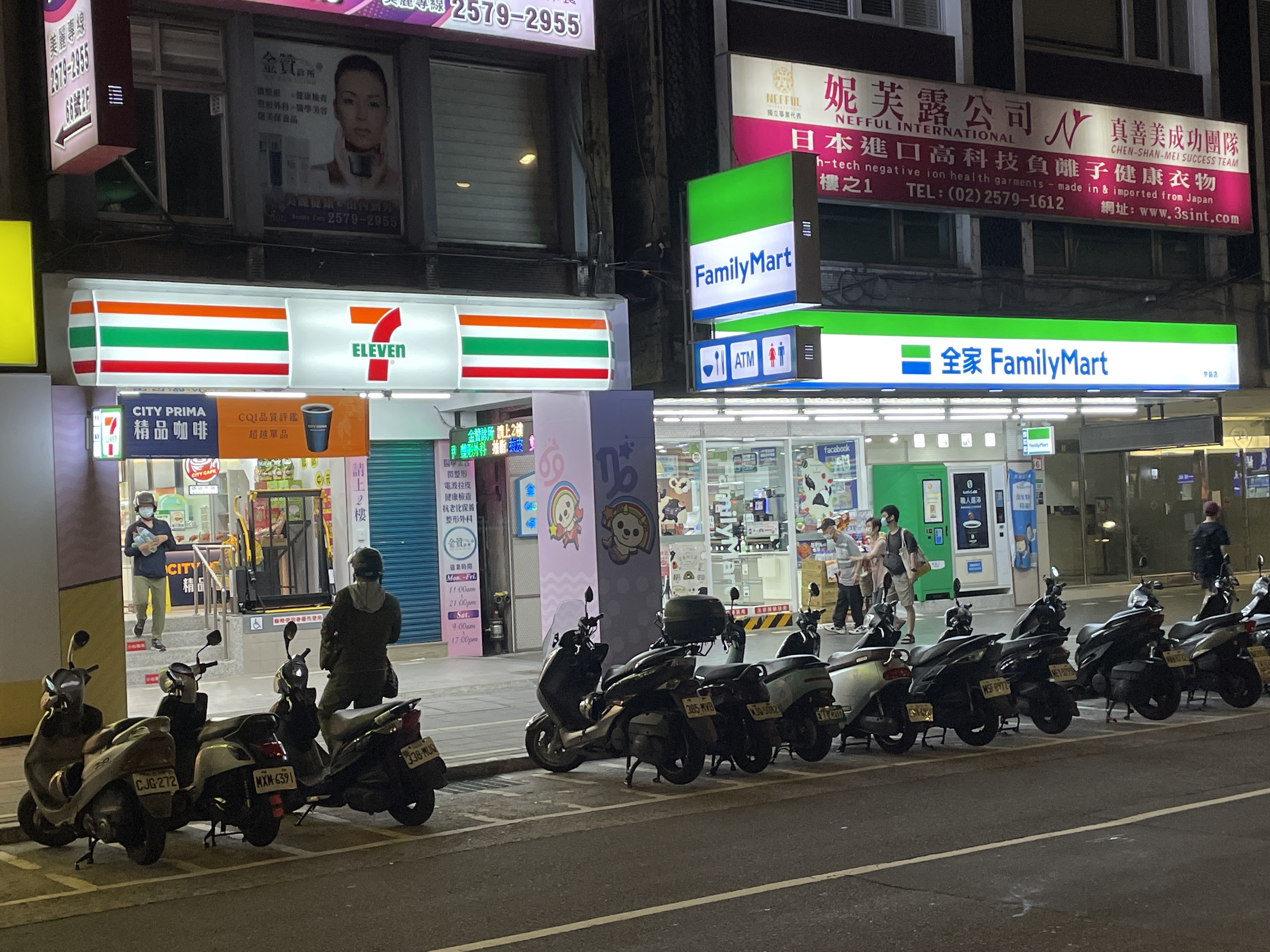
It is also not rare in Taiwan to see two convenience stores right next to each other.

=== Turkey ===
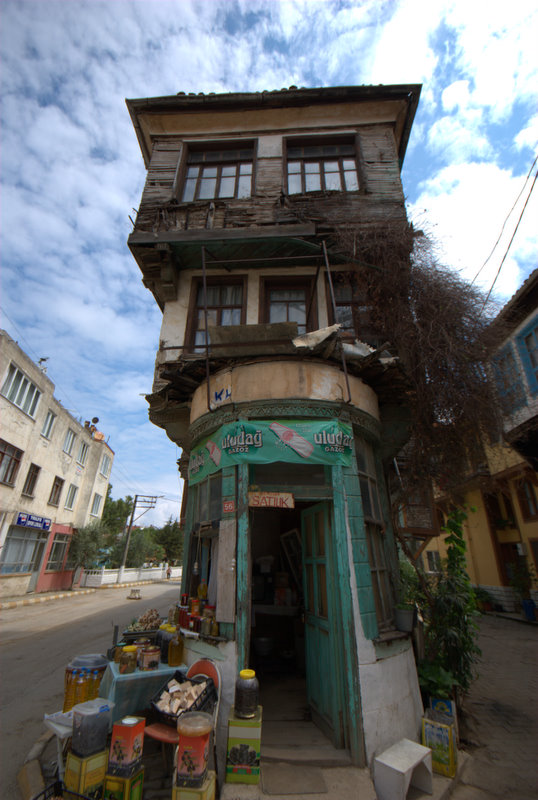
Bakkal in Bursa, Turkey (2008)

In Turkey, convenience stores are often referred to as bakkal. A bakkal is a small, traditional retail shop specializing in the sale of non-perishable or semi-fresh food items, canned goods, beverages, and household cleaning products. Many bakkals also offer basic personal care products, tobacco, and sometimes newspapers or lottery tickets.

Bakkals often serve as neighborhood convenience stores. Bakkals are typically family-owned and operated businesses that provide everyday necessities to residents within a specific neighborhood. Unlike supermarkets, bakkals often allow customers to purchase goods on credit, maintaining informal ledgers known as credit notebooks (veresiye defteri).

Traditionally, the bakkal has held a central place in Turkish neighborhood life, functioning not only as a point of sale but also as a social hub where neighbors interact.

In recent decades, the number of bakkals has declined significantly due to the rise of large supermarket chains and discount retailers. These modern competitors benefit from economies of scale, wider product ranges, and lower prices, making it increasingly difficult for small independent bakkals to compete. Urban development, rising rent costs, and changing consumer habits have also contributed to the decline of the traditional bakkal. Despite these challenges, bakkals remain symbolic of Turkey's small-scale entrepreneurship and continue to operate in many neighborhoods, particularly in less urbanized areas.

=== United Kingdom ===
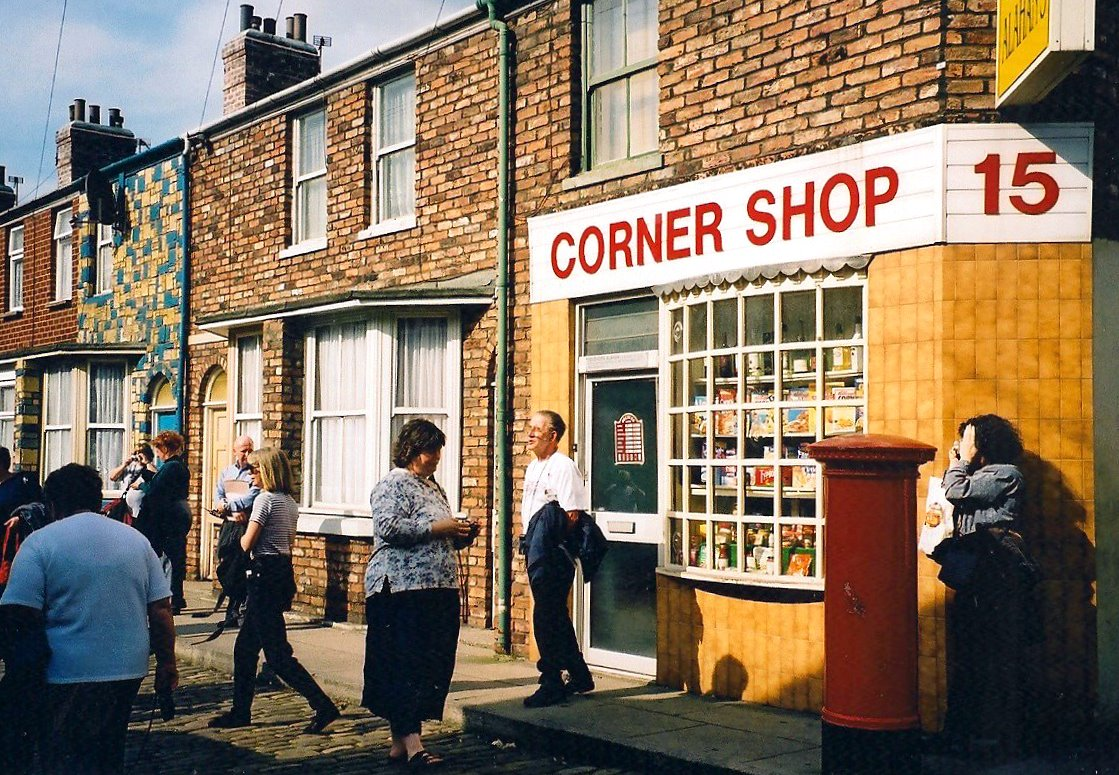
A corner shop set from the soap opera Coronation Street, depicting a typical British independently-owned corner shop in Manchester

The corner shop in the United Kingdom grew from the start of the Industrial Revolution, with large populations moving from the agricultural countryside to newly built model townships and later terraced housing in towns and cities. Corner shops were locally owned small businesses, started by entrepreneurs who often had other careers prior to establishing, such a trading business. Many well-known high-street retail brands, such as Marks and Spencer, Sainsbury's and more recently Tesco, originated during the Victorian era as simple, family-owned corner shops.

The name "corner shop" originated because such shops are traditionally located at the corner of a street.

The reign of the corner shop and the weekly market started to fade post–World War II, with the combination of the personal motor car and the introduction from the 1950s onwards of the American-originated supermarket format. The market shift in price and convenience led to the establishment of common trading brands operating as virtual franchises to win back the consumer, including Budgens, Costcutter, Londis, Nisa and SPAR. There was also a consolidation of some shops under some larger corporate-owned brands, including One Stop.

The primary competition to this privately-owned "corner shop" model came from the network of consumer cooperatives which were created after the success of that created by the Rochdale Society of Equitable Pioneers in 1844. Rather than being owned by individuals, these shops were owned by their customer-members and, owing to their popularity, the number of co-operative shops had reached 1,439 by 1900. Co-operatives came about as a response to the problem of adulterated food which existed at the time, and later they enabled members to buy types of food that they would otherwise be unable to afford. At their peak in the 1950s, consumers' co-operatives accounted for approximately 20% of the UK grocery market; however, with increasing competition, this has decreased to around 6% in 2015.

Due to a number of mergers over the years, the grocery co-operative sector in the UK is now predominately composed of the national The Co-operative Group and a few large regional co-operative societies such as the Midcounties Co-operative and Scotmid. Today, the majority of food retailing co-operative societies brand their convenience shops as Co-op Food, and together they form the second-largest convenience store chain in the UK and the largest by number of shops, with one in every UK post code.

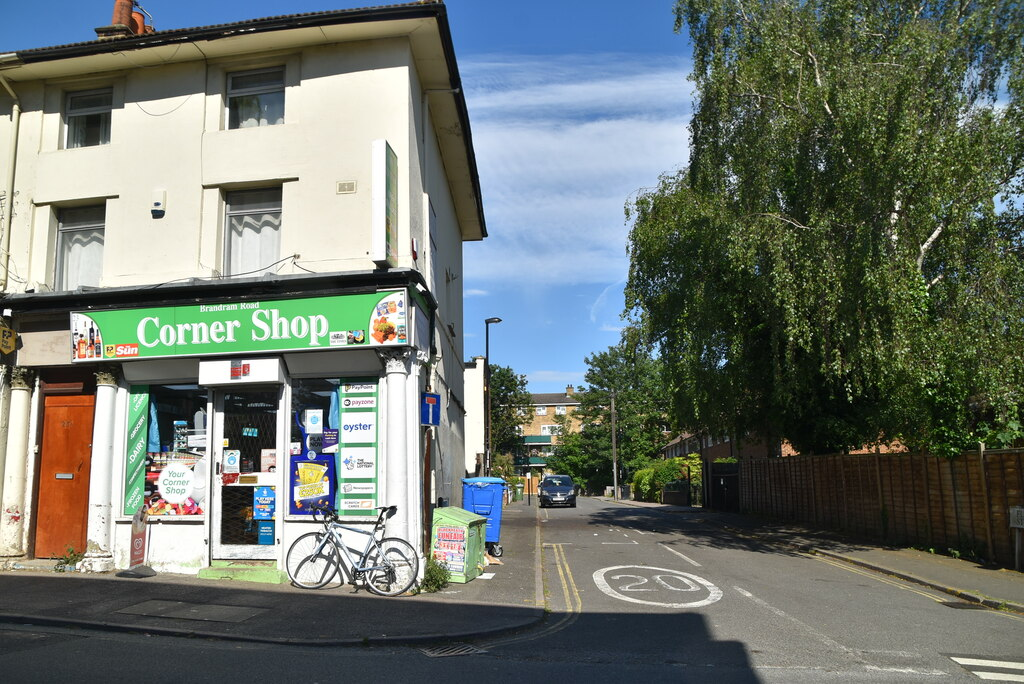
A modern British corner shop in Lee, Lewisham

From the late-1960s onwards, many such shops started to be owned by expatriate African-born Indians, expelled from their homelands by the newly independent countries' rulers (see Expulsion of Asians from Uganda). Under the Shops Act 1950, Sunday trading had been illegal for most traders, with exceptions only allowed for small shops selling perishable items (such as milk, bread, butter, fresh meat and vegetables), and most shops that were not off-licences (i.e. selling alcohol) had to close at 20:00. The Sunday Trading Act 1994 allowed large-format shops over 280 square meters (3,000 sq ft) in size to open on Sunday for not more than six hours despite several proposals from the citizens to remove restrictions at different times.

More recently, due to a combination of competition laws and a lack of large-scale development space, many of the larger retail brands have now developed shop formats based around convenience-shop- and corner-shop-scale spaces, including Sainsbury's Local, Little Waitrose and Tesco Express.

=== United States ===
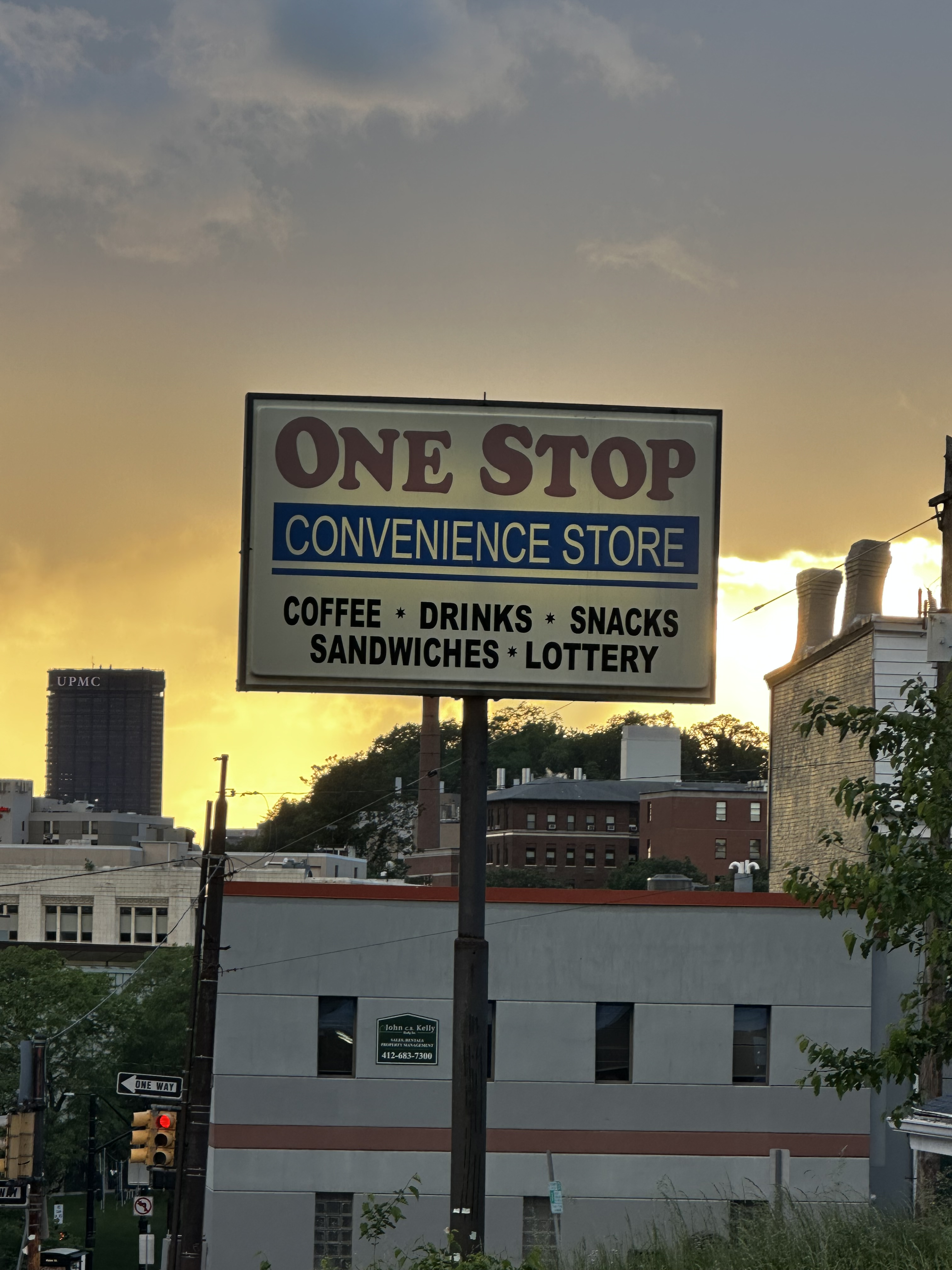
Sign for a convenience store in Pittsburgh

In-store convenience store sales grew 2.4%, reaching a record $195.0 billion in 2011. Combined with $486.9 billion in motor fuels sales, total convenience store sales in 2011 were $681.9 billion, or one out of every 22 dollars of the overall $15.04 trillion U.S. gross domestic product. In New York City, "bodega" has come to mean any convenience store or deli.

The first chain convenience store in the United States was opened in Dallas, Texas in 1927 by the Southland Ice Company, which eventually became 7-Eleven, the largest convenience store chain. Stores connected to a service station developed into a trend, celebrated by some progressive architects:

In 1939, a dairy owner named J.J. Lawson started a store at his dairy plant near Akron, Ohio, to sell his milk. The Lawson's Milk Company grew to a chain of stores, primarily in Ohio. Circle K, another large company-owned convenience store chain, was founded in 1951.

Since that time, many different convenience store brands have developed, and their stores may either be corporate-owned or franchises. The items offered for sale tend to be similar despite store brand, and almost always include chips, milk, coffee, soft drinks, bread, snacks, ice cream, candy, gum, cigarettes, lip balm, condoms, phone cards, maps, magazines, newspapers, small toys, car supplies, feminine hygiene products, cat food, dog food and toilet paper. Other less common items include sandwiches, pizza, and frozen food. Nearly all convenience stores also have an automated teller machine (ATM), though other banking services are usually not available. State lottery tickets are also available at these stores.

In 1966, the US convenience store industry first recorded $1 billion in sales. By the end of the decade, the industry had recorded $3.5 billion a year in sales. The first 24-hour store opened in Las Vegas in 1963. By the late 1960s, the number of 24-hour convenience stores increased to meet the needs of a younger population and people who were working late night or early morning shifts.

Some convenience stores in the US also sell gasoline. Only 2,500 stores had self-serve at the pump by 1969. It was not until the 1970s that retailers realized selling gasoline could be profitable and competitive. At the same time, two energy shortages in the decade had many service station owners stop selling fuel altogether since they made more money off of vehicle maintenance, while others decided to convert their garages into convenience stores, noting that they met a need and in some cases netted more profits than garages.

In the gasoline service station may be seen the beginning of an important advance agent of decentralization by way of distribution and also the beginning of the establishment of the Broadacre City. Wherever the service station happens to be naturally located, these now crude and seemingly insignificant units will grow and expand into various distributing centers for merchandise of all sorts. They are already doing so in the Southwest to a great extent.

— Frank Lloyd Wright, The Disappearing City, 1932

In 2011, there were approximately 47,195 gas stations with convenience stores that generated $326 billion in revenue. Of the 150,000 convenience stores in the country, 120,000 of them are located at fuel stations, which sell approximately 80 percent of the fuels purchased in the country.

Policies regarding the sale of adult magazines vary, but generally larger chains (such as 7-Eleven and Casey's General Stores) do not sell these items, while smaller independent stores may do so. One notable exception is fast-growing regional chain Sheetz, which until the late 2010s sold some soft-core pornographic material such as Playboy, Penthouse, and Playgirl. Sheetz ended this practice as part of a broader decision to end sales of all print media.

Because the laws regarding the sale of alcoholic beverages vary from state to state in the US, the availability of beer, wine, and liquor varies greatly. For example, while convenience stores in Alaska, Pennsylvania, and New Jersey cannot sell any kind of alcohol at all, stores in Nevada, New Mexico, and California may sell alcoholic beverages of any sort, while stores in Virginia, Idaho, or Oregon can sell beer and wine, but not liquor. Similar to grocery stores, convenience stores in New York can sell beer only, not wine or liquor. Altoona, Pennsylvania–based Sheetz tried to find a loophole in 2007 by classifying part of one of their prototype stores in Altoona as a restaurant, which would permit alcohol sales. State courts in Pennsylvania promptly overruled this. State law requires restaurants to have on-site consumption, but Sheetz did not do this. Sheetz continues to sell alcohol in other states. In recent years, Sheetz has begun to sell both beer (in the form of walk-in "beer caves") and wine in most of their Pennsylvania stores as well.

==== Crime ====
American convenience stores are often targets of armed robbery. In some areas of the US it is not unusual for clerks to work behind bulletproof glass windows, even during daylight hours. Some convenience stores may limit access inside at night, requiring customers to approach a walk-up window to make purchases. The main dangers are that almost all convenience stores only have one person working during the night shift; most of the transactions are in cash; and easily resold merchandise, such as liquor, lottery tickets and cigarettes, are on site.

Most convenience stores have a cash drop slot into a time-delay safe to limit the amount of cash on hand. Many have installed security cameras to help deter robbery and shoplifting. Because of their vulnerability to crime, nearly all convenience stores have a friendly relationship with the local police. To reduce burglaries when the store is closed, some convenience stores have bars on the windows.

== Similar concepts ==
Convenience stores to some extent replaced the old-fashioned general store. They are similar to Australian milk bars, but unlike these are often franchises and not "Mum and Dad" small business operations. In Britain, corner shops in towns and village shops in the countryside served similar purposes and were the precursors to the modern European convenience shop (e.g. Spar). In the Canadian province of Quebec, dépanneurs (often referred to as "deps" in English) are often family-owned neighbourhood shops that serve similar purposes. Truck stops, also known as "travel centers", combine a shop offering similar goods with a convenience store with amenities for professional drivers of semi-trailer trucks. This may include fast food restaurants, showers and facilities for buying large quantities of diesel fuel. The equivalent in Europe is the motorway service station.

Neighborhood grocery stores not big enough to be considered a supermarket often compete with convenience shops. For example, in Los Angeles, a local chain operates neighborhood grocery stores that fill a niche between a traditional supermarket and convenience shop. Because they stock fresh fruit and fresh meat and carry upwards of 5,000 items, they have a lot in common with the supermarket. Due to the relatively small store size, customers can get in and out conveniently or have purchases delivered. In Belgium, convenience shops known as night shops are only permitted to open at night.

== See also ==
- Automated convenience store
- List of convenience stores
- National Association of Convenience Stores
- Take a penny, leave a penny
- Types of retail outlets
