= Hi-Life (convenience store) =

Taiwanese convenience store chain

Hi-Life International Co., Ltd.
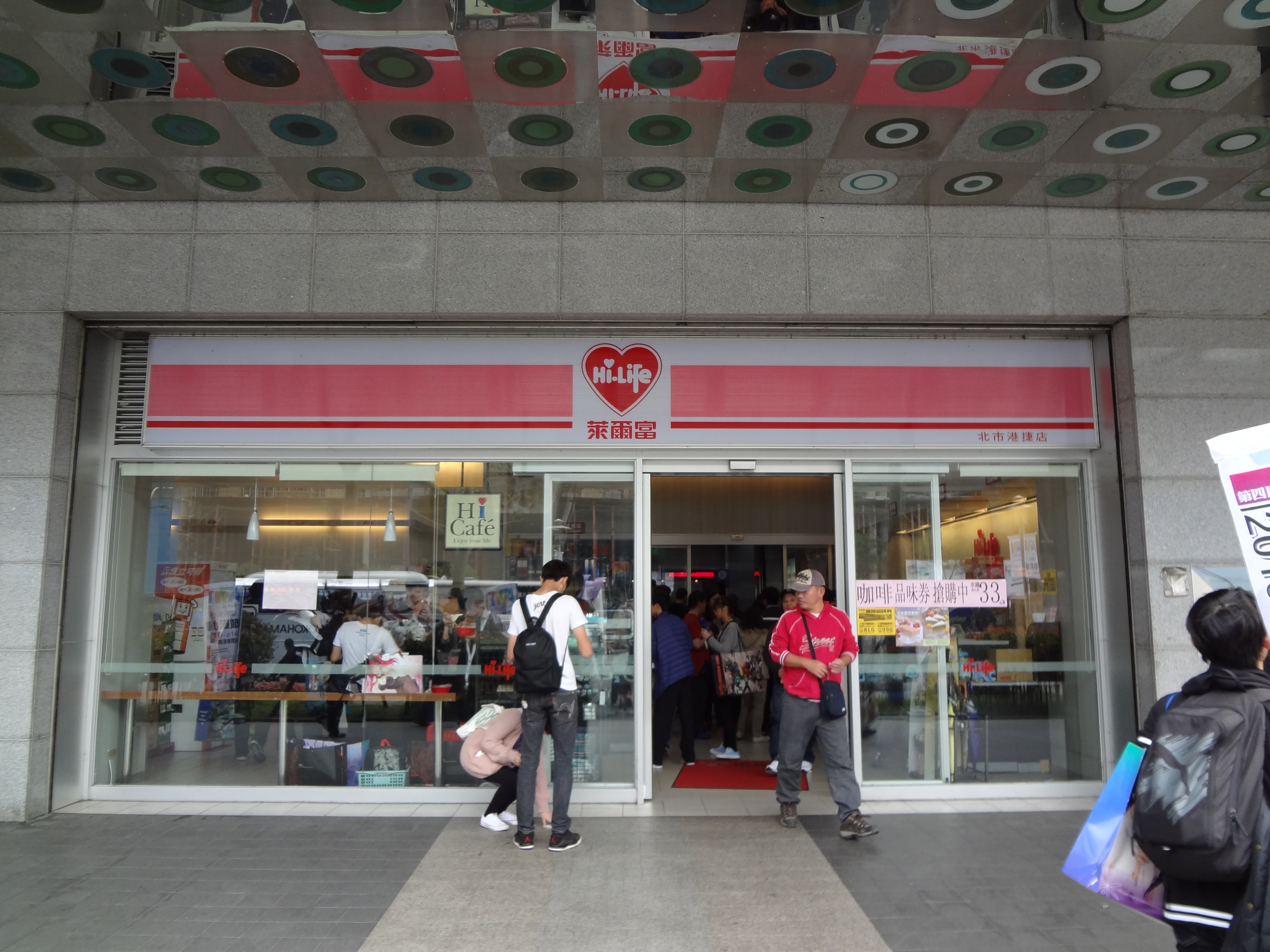
- Hi-Life Taipei City Ganjie Store
- Trade name: Hi-Life International Co., Ltd.
- Type: Private limited company
- Industry: Grocery stores, convenience stores, retail
- Founded: 1989; 37 years ago in Taipei
- Headquarters: No.502, Ruiguang Road, 3rd Floor, Neihu District, Taipei, Taiwan
- Number of locations: 1590 (2025)
- Area served: Taiwan
- Website: www.hilife.com.tw/language_en1980.aspx

Hi-Life International, doing business as Hi-Life (Chinese: 萊爾富; pinyin: Lái Ěr Fù), is a Taiwanese convenience store chain. Its first location was opened on Dihua Street in Taipei in 1989. It is among Taiwan's four largest convenience stores alongside 7-Eleven, FamilyMart, and OK Mart.
