= List of convenience stores =

The following is a list of convenience stores or convenience shops organized by geographical location and by the country where the headquarters are located.

== Multinational chains ==
Company or brand name	Parent company	Headquarters	Countries served	Number of locations
7-Eleven	Seven & I Holdings	Japan; United States	Japan, United States, Thailand, South Korea, China, Taiwan, Israel, Vietnam, Malaysia, Philippines, UAE, India, Laos, Australia, Denmark, Singapore, Norway, Sweden, Canada, Mexico, Cambodia (2025)	84,500+
FamilyMart	Itochu	Japan	Japan, China, Philippines, Indonesia, Taiwan, Thailand, Vietnam, Malaysia (2016)	24,243
OXXO	FEMSA	Mexico	Mexico, Argentina, Brazil, Colombia, Chile, Peru, United States	21,706
Lawson	Mitsubishi Corporation	Japan	Japan, China, Indonesia, Philippines, Thailand, United States (Hawaii)	20,833
Alfamart	AlfaCorp	Indonesia	Indonesia, Philippines	20,687+
Circle K	Alimentation Couche-Tard	Canada	Canada, United States, Cambodia, China (Hong Kong and Macau), Denmark, Norway, Guam, Honduras, Indonesia, Latvia, Mexico, Philippines, Sweden, United Arab Emirates, Vietnam, Egypt, Estonia, Ireland, Poland, New Zealand	14,471
Żabka	CVC Capital Partners	Poland	Poland, Romania, Czech Republic, Slovakia, Germany	13,000
Carrefour City	Carrefour	France	France, Italy, Greece, Belgium, Spain, Poland, Pakistan, Brazil, Colombia, Dominican Republic	8,954
CBA	CBA	Hungary	Bulgaria, Italy, Lithuania, Greece, Czech Republic, Croatia, Hungary, Montenegro, Romania, Serbia, Slovakia	5,200
Ministop	Aeon Group	Japan	China, Japan, Kazakhstan, Vietnam	5,177
Tesco Express	Tesco	United Kingdom	United Kingdom, Czech Republic, Hungary, Ireland, Slovakia	4,673 (2021)
SPAR Express	SPAR	Netherlands; France	Netherlands, France, Australia, Austria, Belgium, China, Croatia, Germany, Ireland, Russia, South Africa (branded as KWIKSPAR), Slovenia, Switzerland, Thailand, Ukraine, United Kingdom, Zimbabwe	3,600

== Convenience stores by country ==
=== Africa ===
==== Kenya ====
- National Oil

==== Morocco ====
- Mini-Brahim

==== South Africa ====
- Woolworths Foodstop, partnered with Engen
- Pick n Pay Express, partnered with BP
- FreshStop, partnered with Astron
- Spar Express, partnered with Shell
- Circle K, partnered with Puma
- Sasol delight (in-house Sasol brand)

=== Asia ===
==== China ====
- 7-Eleven
- Circle K
- FamilyMart
- Lawson
- Ministop
- Suning
- VanGO
- Wumart

==== Hong Kong ====
- Circle K
- Ministop
- PARKnSHOP Express
- 7-Eleven
- VanGO

==== India ====
- Smart Bazaar
- LuLu Group International
- Spencer's
- Reliance Fresh
- Spar
- More
- DMart
- 7-Eleven

==== Indonesia ====
- 212 Mart
- Alfamart
- Alfamidi
- Circle K
- FamilyMart
- Indomaret
- Lawson

Defunct:

- 7-Eleven

==== Japan ====
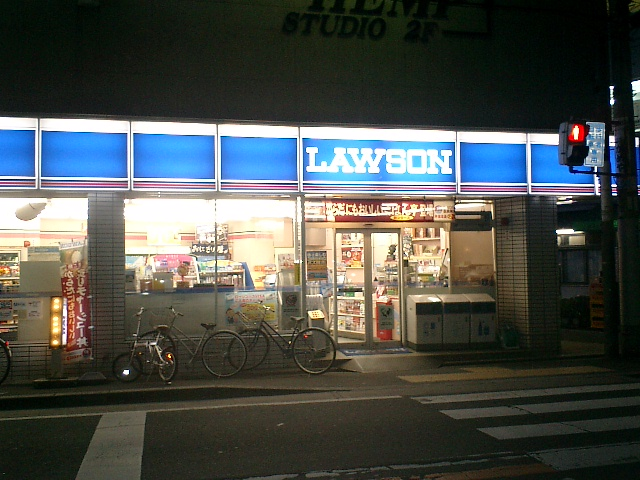
Lawson Terauchicho 1Chome Shop (Moriguchi, Osaka, Japan)

- 7 & 11 (7-Eleven)
- Lawson
- FamilyMart
- ~~Circle K Sunkus~~ (Acquired by FamilyMart)
- Ministop
- Daily Yamazaki
- Poplar
- Seicomart
- NewDays (JR East)
- My Basket (Aeon)

==== Malaysia ====
- 7-Eleven
- MyNews
- KR1M (dissolved, formerly owned by the Government of Malaysia and managed by Mydin)
- MyMart
- CU
- Econsave
- Emart24
- KK Super Mart
- Kedai Runcit Usaha Kami (closed)
- 99 Speedmart
- FamilyMart
- Jaya Grocer
- MR.DIY
- Eco-Shop
- Ninso

==== Mongolia ====
- CU (more than 310 stores)
- GS25

==== Pakistan ====
- Carrefour (JV with MAF under the name of "Hyper Star")
- Metro Cash and Carry
- SPAR

==== Philippines ====
- 7-Eleven
- Circle K
- FamilyMart
- Minimart
- Lawson
- Alfamart
- Uncle John's

==== Singapore ====
- Cheers/FairPrice Xpress (owned by NTUC FairPrice)
- 7-Eleven (owned by DFI Retail Group)

==== South Korea ====
- GS25
- CU
- 7-Eleven
- emart24
- storyway
- ~~ministop~~ (Acquired by 7-Eleven)

==== Taiwan ====
- 7-Eleven
- FamilyMart
- Hi-Life
- OK Mart
- Simple Mart

==== Thailand ====
- 7-Eleven
- Lotus's Go Fresh
- FamilyMart
- Fresh Mart (700+ shops)
- Mini Big C (396 shops as of 2016)
- 108 Shop Mini Outlet (now operates or services over 250 shops)
- Jiffy
- Lawson 108
- Tops Daily

==== Vietnam ====
- B's Mart (owned by Berli Jucker)
- Bach Hoa Xanh (owned by MWG)
- Cheers (joint venture between Saigon Co.op and NTUC Fairprice)
- Co.op Smile & Co.op Food (owned by Saigon Co.op)
- Circle K
- FamilyMart
- GS25
- Ministop
- Winmart+ (owned by Masan Group)
- 7-Eleven

Defunct:

- ampm (ended business in 1998)

=== Europe ===
Listed by country where headquartered:

==== Finland ====
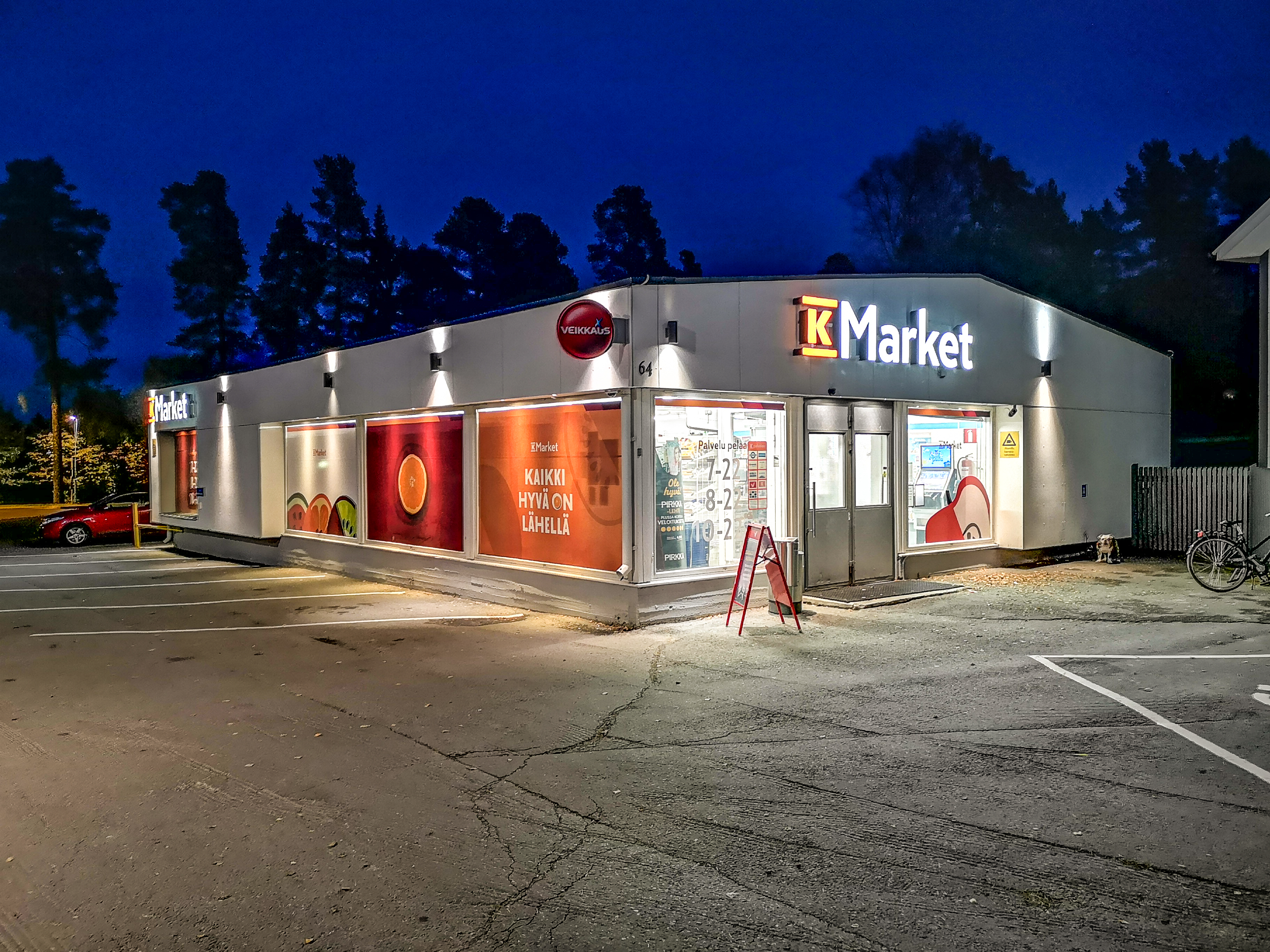
K-Market

- R-kioski owned by Reitangruppen
- Sale, Alepa, owned by the S Group

==== France ====
- 8 à Huit
- Carrefour City – France

==== Hungary ====
- CBA
- COOP

==== Ireland ====
- Centra – Ireland and Northern Ireland, owned by the Musgrave Group

==== Netherlands ====
- Albert Heijn To Go – owned by Stationsfoodstore, a franchiser of Albert Heijn (in addition to normal Albert Heijn supermarkets elsewhere)
- Jumbo City - can be found within city centers and some train stations.
- SPAR (EuroSpar, SuperSpar) – large chain throughout Europe

==== Norway ====
- 7-Eleven
- Coop Mega – owned by Coop Norge
- Coop Prix – owned by Coop Norge
- Bunnpris – owned by I.K. Lykke
- Deli de Luca – Norway – owned by Norgesgruppen
- Extra – owned by Coop Norge
- Kiwi – owned by Norgesgruppene
- Narvesen – operates in Norway, Latvia, and Lithuania – owned by Reitan Group
- Meny – operates in Norway and Denmark – owned by Norgesgruppen
- Pressbyrån – operates in Sweden – owned by Reitan Group
- Rema 1000 – bought Lidl Norge – operates in Norway, Denmark and Sweden – owned by Reitan Group
- R-kioski – operates in Finland and Estonia – bought by Reitan Group in 2012

==== Poland ====
- Freshmarket
- Groszek
- Małpka Express
- Polomarket
- Społem
- Żabka – operates in Eastern Europe; the Czech Republic division was sold to Tesco in 2010

==== Russia ====
- Dixy
- Magnit
- Mini Lenta
- Pyaterochka
- SPAR
- VkusVill

==== Spain ====
- DIA
- Mercadona

==== Switzerland ====
- Coop
- Denner
- Migros

==== United Kingdom ====
- Best-One – supplied by Bestway
- Budgens – owned by Booker Retail Partners GB
- Co-op Food
- Costcutter
- David Sands
- Happy Shopper – Supplied by Booker Cash & Carry, which, in turn, is owned by Tesco plc.
- Kwik Save – bought by Costcutter in 2012
- L&F Jones
- Little Waitrose – convenience shop format for John Lewis' Waitrose Supermarkets
- Londis – owned by Booker Retail Partners GB
- Mace – convenience shop format for Palmer & Harvey wholesale
- Morning, Noon & Night – Scotland
- Nisa – private limited company and retailers' co-operative
- One Stop – owned by Tesco plc
- Premier Stores – Supplied by Booker Cash & Carry, which, in turn, is owned by Tesco plc.
- Sainsbury's Local – including Sainsbury's at Bells, convenience shop format for Sainsbury's supermarkets
- Tesco Express – convenience shop format for Tesco, a supermarket chain
- WHSmith

=== North America ===
Listed by country or country subdivision:

==== Canada ====
- Becker's
- Circle K
- Couche-Tard/Provi-Soir
- Irving Blue Canoe / Irving Mainway
- Needs Convenience
- OLCO
- On the Run, at Exxon and Mobil stations in the US; Esso and Mobil stations internationally, owned by Couche-Tard
- Pioneer
- Quickie Convenience Stores

==== Mexico ====
- 7-Eleven
- Farmacias Guadalajara
- OXXO
- Super City – owned by Soriana
- Tiendas Extra

==== United States ====
Stores are listed by the location of their corporate headquarters. Most of these operate in multiple states:

===== Arizona =====
- Circle K (Tempe)

===== California =====
- ampm (La Palma) – located at ARCO gas stations
- ExtraMile (San Ramon) – at Chevron gas stations

===== Colorado =====
- Loaf 'N Jug (Pueblo) – a division of EG Group

===== Florida =====
- Gate Petroleum (Jacksonville)

===== Georgia =====
- RaceTrac (Atlanta)
- Stuckey's (Eastman)

===== Hawaii =====
- ABC Stores (Honolulu)
- Aloha Island Mart (Honolulu) – owned by Aloha Petroleum
- nomnom (Honolulu) – owned by Par Hawaii, a subsidiary of Par Pacific Holdings
- Sullivan Family of Companies (Honolulu) – owns several chains in Hawaii

===== Idaho =====
- Albertsons Express (Boise)
- Jacksons Food Stores (Boise)
- Roady's Truck Stops (New Plymouth)

===== Illinois =====
- Foxtrot (Chicago)
- Huck's Food & Fuel (Carmi)
- Jewel Express (Itasca)
- Road Ranger (Rockford)
- Wally's (Pontiac)

===== Indiana =====
- Martin's Fuel Centers (South Bend)

===== Iowa =====
- Casey's General Stores (Ankeny) – concentrated in the Midwestern US, primarily in Iowa, Illinois, Minnesota, and Missouri
- Kum & Go (Hampton) – operates in the Midwestern US

===== Kansas =====
- Kwik Shop (Hutchinson) – a division of EG Group

===== Kentucky =====
- Minit Mart (Bowling Green)
- Thorntons (Louisville)

===== Maryland =====
- High's Dairy Store (Hanover)
- Royal Farms (Baltimore)

===== Massachusetts =====
- Cumberland Farms (Framingham) – locations throughout New England

===== Michigan =====
- Meijer (Grand Rapids) – located at Meijer hypermarkets, with a few standalone convenience stores in Michigan
- WESCO (North Muskegon)

===== Minnesota =====
- Cenex (Inver Grove Heights) – owned by CHS Inc.
- Holiday Stationstores (Bloomington)

===== Mississippi =====
- Jr. Food Mart (Flowood)

===== Missouri =====
- Break Time (Columbia) – owned by MFA Oil

===== Montana =====
- Town Pump (Butte) – operates truck stops with casinos in Montana

===== Nevada =====
- EddieWorld (Beatty)
- Terrible Herbst (Las Vegas)

===== New Jersey =====
- QuickChek (Whitehouse Station)

===== New Mexico =====
- Allsup's (Clovis)

===== New York =====
- Byrne Dairy (Syracuse)
- Dairy Barn (East Northport)
- NOCO Express (Tonawanda)
- Stewart's Shops (Saratoga Springs)

===== North Carolina =====
- The Pantry (Cary) – operating under various names in the southeastern United States – Acquired by Circle K
- Kangaroo Express – formerly Petro Express, now owned by Circle K
- VPS Convenience (Wilmington)

===== Ohio =====
- Convenient Food Mart (Mentor)
- Speedway (Enon) – owned by 7-Eleven also operates many former Hess stores
- TravelCenters of America (Westlake)
- United Dairy Farmers (Cincinnati) – operates in the Cincinnati metropolitan area (Ohio, Kentucky, Indiana) plus other Ohio locations

===== Oklahoma =====
- Love's Travel Stops & Country Stores (Oklahoma City) – operates truck stops.
- QuikTrip (Tulsa) – primarily found in the Midwestern and Southern United States.

===== Oregon =====
- Dari Mart (Junction City)
- Plaid Pantry (Beaverton) – operates locations in Oregon and Washington

===== Pennsylvania =====
- A-Plus (Philadelphia) – located at Sunoco gas stations
- Acme Express (Malvern) – Greater Philadelphia
- GetGo (Pittsburgh) – locations throughout western Pennsylvania, western Maryland, northern West Virginia, Ohio, and Indiana, a division of Giant Eagle
- Kwik Fill / Red Apple / Country Fair (Warren) – locations throughout central and western Pennsylvania, eastern Ohio, and western New York
- Rutter's (York) – locations throughout central and eastern Pennsylvania
- Sheetz (Altoona) – locations throughout Pennsylvania, Ohio, West Virginia, Maryland, Virginia, and North Carolina
- Tom's Convenience Store (York) – locations throughout central Pennsylvania
- Turkey Hill Minit Markets (Lancaster) – locations throughout central and eastern Pennsylvania, central Ohio, and central Indiana.
- Wawa (Wawa) – locations throughout eastern Pennsylvania, New Jersey, Delaware, eastern Maryland, eastern Virginia, and Florida

===== Tennessee =====
- MAPCO Express (Brentwood) – a subsidiary of Majors Management LLC
- Pilot Flying J (Knoxville)
- Pilot Food Mart (Knoxville)
- Weigel's (Powell)

===== Texas =====
- 7-Eleven (Dallas)
- AAFES (Dallas) – located on military bases
- Buc-ee's (Lake Jackson)
- Corner Store (San Antonio)
- Exxon (Irving)
- Stripes Convenience Stores (Corpus Christi)

===== Utah =====
- Maverik (Salt Lake City) Run by FJ Management Inc.; formerly known as Flying J Inc., with 400 locations across 13 states in the Intermountain West (except Texas) and South Dakota and Nebraska.

===== Virginia =====
- Fas Mart/Shore Stop (Richmond)
- Farm Fresh Express (Virginia Beach)

===== Washington =====
- Quick Pack Food Mart, Seattle

===== West Virginia =====
- Go-Mart – chain with locations in West Virginia, Virginia, Kentucky, and Ohio

===== Wisconsin =====
- Kwik Trip / Kwik Star (La Crosse) – Kwik Trip in Wisconsin, Michigan, South Dakota, and Minnesota, and Kwik Star in Iowa and Illinois

=== Oceania ===
==== Australia ====
As of 2021, over 8,000 individual convenience stores are operating in Australia. The most common brands and franchises include:

- 7-Eleven
- Ampol
- EzyMart
- IGA X-press
- NewsLink
- NightOwl Convenience Stores
- OTR
- Reddy Express
- Spar

=== South America ===
==== Brazil ====
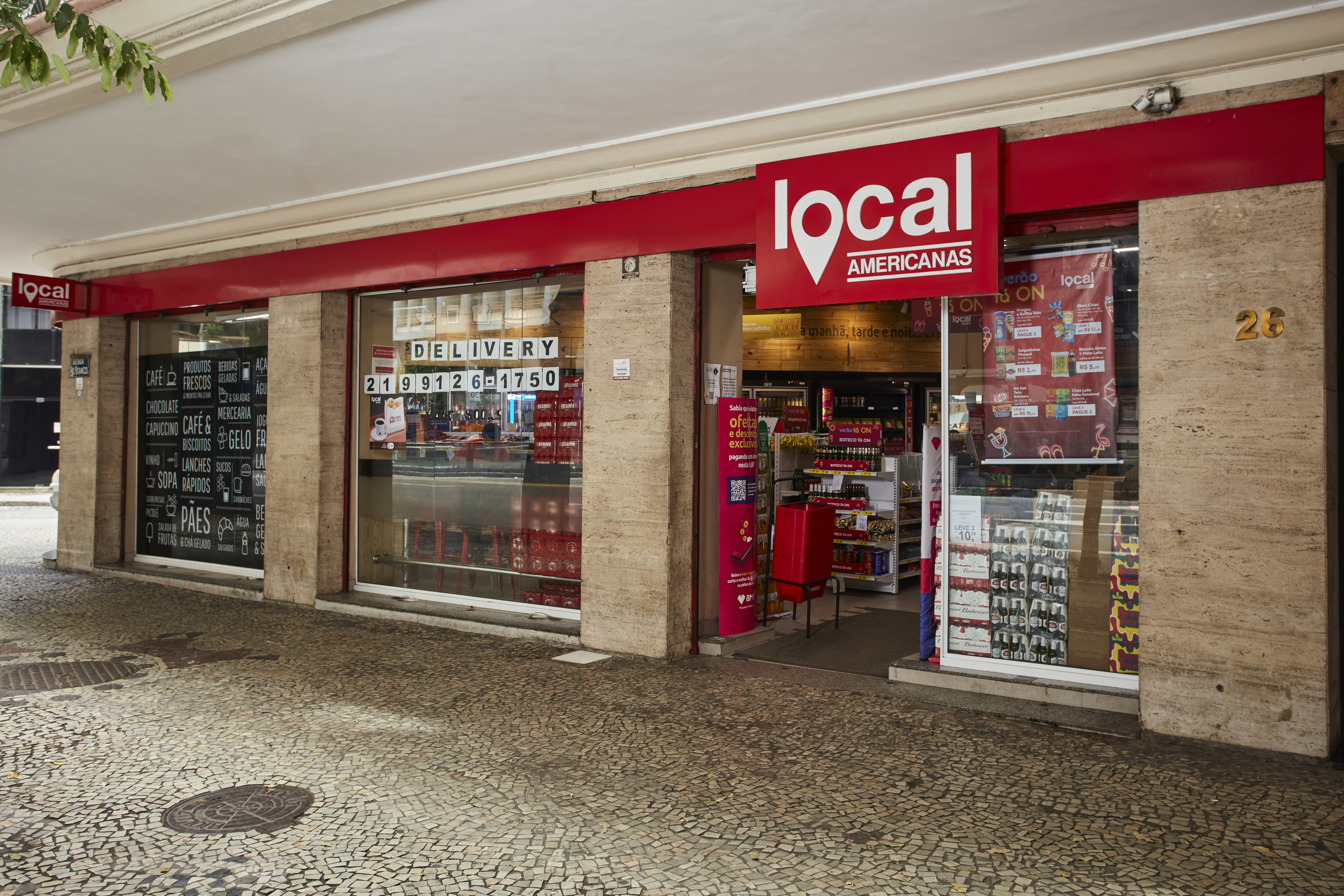
Local Americanas store in Rio de Janeiro, Brazil

In Brazil, most convenience stores are installed at gas stations; over 8,100 stores are operating at service stations. In 2019, over 3,100 individual convenience stores were operating in the country. The most common chains and franchises include:

- ampm
- BR Mania
- Carrefour Express
- Extrafarma
- Local Americanas
- Mini Extra
- Minuto Pão de Açúcar
- OXXO
- Shell Select

==== Paraguay ====
- Biggie (convenience store)

== Former ==
- Daily Stop – based in Hong Kong, merged into 7-Eleven in 2004
- Hess – based in New York City; sold its gas station/convenience store network to Marathon Petroleum in 2014
- Jacksons Stores – became Sainsbury's at Jacksons in 2004; replaced with the Sainsbury's Local brand in 2008
- Local Plus – based in the UK, bought by the Co-operative Group in 2004
- M Local – former UK convenience shop format for Morrisons Supermarkets
- Mac's – based in Canada, rebranded as Circle K in 2017
- McColl's – former UK chain, traded under as Martin, McColls and RS McColl
- Mills – based in the UK, sold to Tesco in 2010
- Somerfield – bought by the Co-operative Group in 2009
- Town & Country Food Stores – bought by Stripes Convenience Stores in 2007
- Ugo – bought by Poundstretcher in 2012
- Uni-Mart – based in Pennsylvania, bought by Kwik Pik in 2009
- UtoteM – operated until 1984 in the Southwestern United States
- White Hen Pantry – based in Illinois, acquired by 7-Eleven in 2006

== See also ==
- List of department stores
- List of hypermarkets
- List of superstores
