= List of supermarket chains in Thailand =

== Current chains ==
- 108 Shop
- 7-Eleven
- Big C group, includes:
  - Mini Big C
  - Big C Supercenter
  - Big C Extra
- Central Food Retail (a part of Central Retail Corporation) group, includes:
  - Tops Fine Food
  - Tops Food Hall
  - Tops Daily
  - Tops Supermarket
- Super Cheap
- CP Fresh Mart
- CJ More
- Foodland
- Gourmet Market & Home Fresh Mart (part of The Mall Group)
- Jiffy
- Lawson 108 (a part of Lawson and 108 Shop)
- Makro (CP Axtra)
- Maxvalu Tookjai
- Rimping
- Lotus's group, includes:
  - Lotus's Hypermarket
  - Lotus's Prive
  - Lotus's Go Fresh
  - Lotus's Go Fresh Supermarket
- UFM Fuji Super (a part of Fuji Citio and Srikrung Wattana Group)
- Villa Market
- Mitsukochi Depachika

== Defunct chains ==
- Auchan (branches in Thailand now changed and acquired by Big C)
- Carrefour (has been taken over by Group Casino and all Carrefour branches have been renamed Big C Extra)
- Food Lion (Branches in Thailand now acquired by Central Food Retail)
- The Mall Group
- Seiyu Group, includes:
  - SEIYU (branches in Thailand now acquired by Jusco Thailand)
- Walmart
- Isetan
- Spar
- Super Save
- FamilyMart (a part of Central Retail Corporation) group
- Fresh Mart
