= Alberta Market =

Convenience store in Portland, Oregon, U.S.

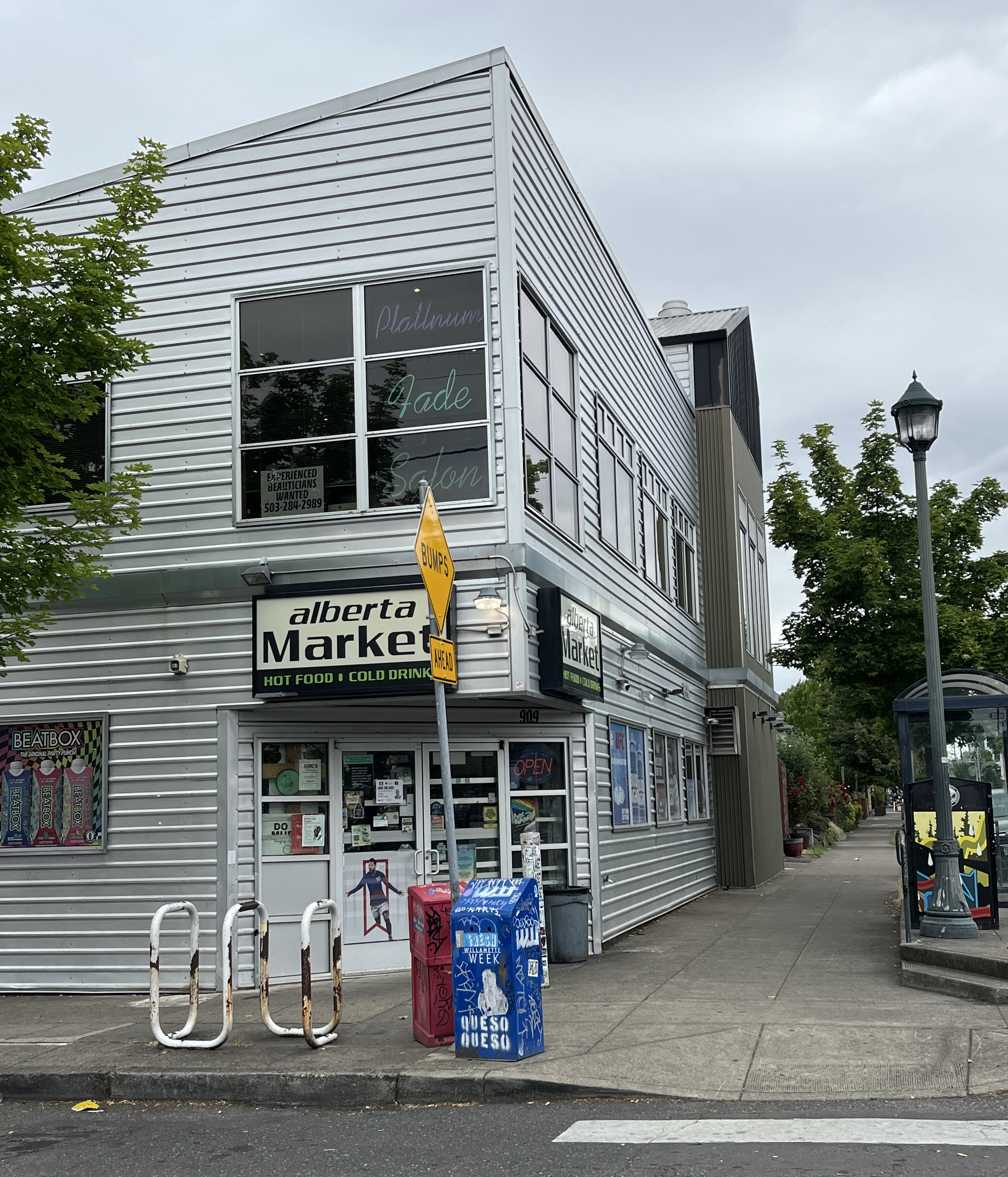
- The convenience store's exterior, 2025
- Interactive map of Alberta Market

Restaurant information
- Location: 909 Northeast Alberta Street, Portland, Multnomah, Oregon, 97211, United States
- Coordinates: 45.5592°N 122.6564°W

Alberta Market is a convenience store in Portland, Oregon, United States. It operates on Alberta Street in northeast Portland's King neighborhood. Jack's Chicken, or simply Jack's, sells chicken wings within the shop. Alberta Market also offers potato wedges, corn dogs, and egg rolls. The shop has garnered a positive reception, especially for its fried chicken and potato wedges. Keith Lee said the fried chicken was among the best he's had.

== Description ==
The convenience store Alberta Market operates at the intersection of Ninth and Alberta Street in northeast Portland's King neighborhood. Within Alberta Market, Jack's Chicken serves Southern-style chicken wings, drumsticks, and thighs. The store also offers "jojos" (potato wedges) as well as corn dogs and egg rolls. Complimentary packets of Ranch dressing are available.

== History ==
Chris Chung is the owner.

Food critic Keith Lee visited the shop in 2025.

== Reception ==
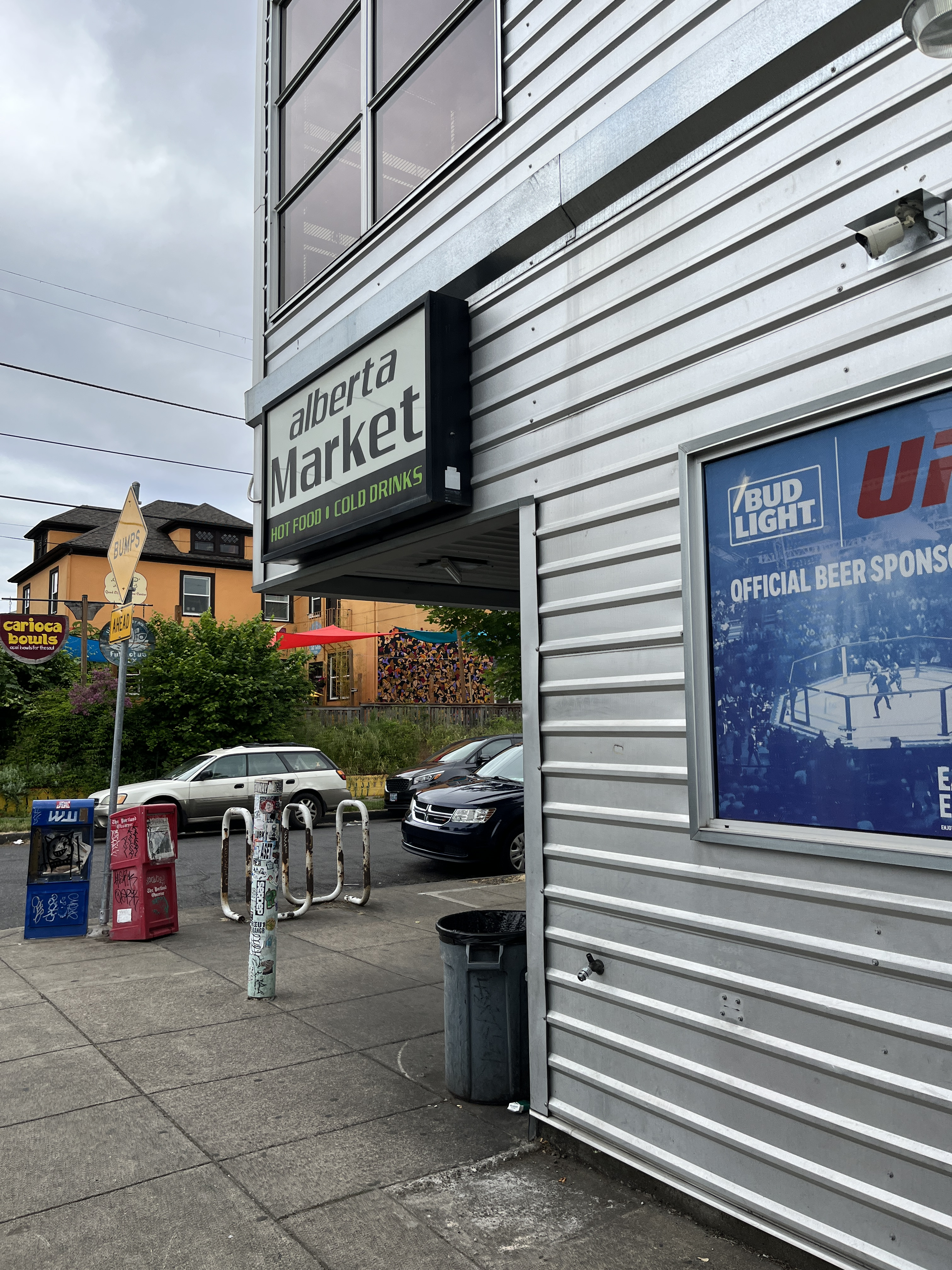
The shop's exterior, 2025

Andy Kryza included Alberta Market in Thrillist's 2013 overview of Portland's best chicken and jojos. Michael Russell included the business in The Oregonian's 2016 overview of the city's five best fried chicken wings. He wrote, "Equally beloved by locals and some of Portland's best chefs, the inexpensive wings ... are breaded and fried to a soft, salty crunch. You can get a half dozen for $5, and you can get them until midnight on Fridays and Saturdays, which happens to be when they taste the best." In Willamette Week's 2017 overview of Portland's best chicken and jojos, Pete Cottell said Alberta Market was the overall winner and had the best jojos. He recommended, "Get there before late afternoon, because they usually sell out, and for good reason."

In Eater Portland's 2024 overview of the city's best "real-deal" fried chicken, Ron Scott and Thom Hilton said, "Ask any local about Jack’s wings and you’ll get the lowdown on a Portland tradition. Tucked inside this unostentatious convenience store are some gently spiced fried chicken wings, paired with the market's deep-fried jojos. Chicken and jojos can be found across the city, but Alberta Market's take may be Portland's most popular." Krista Garcia and Rebecca Roland included Alberta Market and Jack's Chicken in a 2024 list of Portland's eleven best chicken and jojo "champs". The duo wrote, "it's no secret that this corner market is legendary for its fried wings."

In 2024, Eater Portland's Katrina Yentch said Alberta Market's jojos were the "best for nostalgic Portlanders", offering "the most familiar presentation of jojos to locals for its no-frills preparation and affordability". In the website's 2025 overview of the Portland metropolitan area's best chicken wings, Brooke Jackson-Glidden and Dianne de Guzman called the chicken and jojos a "delicious bargain". Katherine Chew Hamilton included Alberta Market in the website's 2025 recommended food and drink options on Alberta Street. She said Alberta Market "might look like an ordinary corner store from the outside, but it's actually a fried chicken hotspot for those in the know."

Writers for Portland Monthly included the chicken and jojos in a 2017 list of the city's thirty best "cheap eats", or inexpensive dishes. In the magazine's 2025 overview of the city's best chicken wings, Alex Frane said, "It couldn't stay a secret forever. For years, the seemingly unremarkable corner store ... was a favorite for those in the know, regulars visiting daily and leaving the shop with nothing more than white paper baggies dotted with fryer grease. Now, various influencers and media outlets (whoops) have spilled that Alberta Market hawks some of the best fried chicken wings in Portland." Frane and Jordan Michelman included the business in a 2026 list of the city's best chicken wings. In his 2025 video review of Alberta Market, Lee said, "In my opinion, it's some of the best fried chicken I've ever had in my life."

== See also ==
- List of chicken restaurants
- List of convenience stores
- Quick Pack Food Mart, a convenience store and fried chicken restaurant in Seattle
