= Foxtrot (disambiguation) =

Foxtrot is a dance and style of music.

Foxtrot or fox trot may also refer to:

== Arts, entertainment, and media ==
=== Films ===
- Fox Trot Finesse, 1915 short silent film comedy
- Foxtrot (1976 film), a British drama film directed by Arturo Ripstein
- Foxtrot (2017 film), an Israeli drama film
- Foxtrot Six, Indonesian action movie (2019)

=== Music ===
- Foxtrot (album), 1972 studio album by Genesis
- Foxtrot, a dutch musical by Annie M.G. Schmidt, Harry Bannink and Paddy Stone (1977)
- musical song Can that Boy foxtrot! by S.J. Sondheim from Follies (1971)
- John C. Adams' "Foxtrot for Orchestra" The Chairman Dances (1985)

=== Other uses in arts–entertainment–media ===
- FoxTrot, syndicated comic strip by Bill Amend
- The Foxtrot, British television play-for-today (1971)

== Horses ==
- Fox trot (gait) or Ambling gait
- Missouri Fox Trotter, a breed of horse

== Other uses ==
- The letter F in the NATO phonetic alphabet
- Foxtrot class submarine of the Soviet era
- Foxtrot (convenience store), a defunct convenience store chain in Illinois
- Foxtrot (criminal network), a criminal network in Sweden
- Foxtrot (Ukrainian retailer), a chain of electronics and home appliance stores

== See also ==
- Foxtrot Broadcasts, high-priority messages sent on the same network as the US Emergency Action Messages
