= Sodini =

Sodini is a surname. Notable people with the surname include:

- Dante Sodini (1858–1934), Italian sculptor
- George Sodini (1960–2009)
- Peter J. Sodini, American businessman
- Pierre-François Sodini (born 1989), French footballer
- Simona Sodini (born 1982), Italian footballer
