= CJ Express Group =

Thai retail company

C.J. Express Group Co., Ltd.
- Native name: บริษัท ซี.เจ. เอ็กซ์เพรส กรุ๊ป จำกัด
- Type: Subsidiary
- Industry: Retail
- Founded: January 4, 2005; 21 years ago
- Number of locations: >1,700 stores (2025)
- Area served: Thailand
- Brands: CJ More; CJ Supermarket; CJX
- Parent: Carabao Group (2013-present)
- Website: https://www.cjmore.co.th/

CJ Express Group Co., Ltd. (Thai: บริษัท ซี.เจ. เอ็กซ์เพรส กรุ๊ป จำกัด) is a Thai retail company that operates convenience stores and supermarkets under the brands CJ Supermarket and CJ More. It was founded in 2005 as a provincial retailer in Ratchaburi and was acquired by Carabao Group in 2013. As of 2025, it operates over 1,700 branches nationwide.

In 2022, the company announced plans to list on the Stock Exchange of Thailand, but was later postponed due to Thailand's weak market sentiment and worsening economic conditions.

== History ==
CJ Express Group was established on January 4, 2005, under the name PSD Rak Thai Co., Ltd. The first branch opened in Ratchaburi province, initially focusing on selling consumer goods at low-prices to provincial communities in Central Thailand.

On August 1, 2013, the business underwent restructuring when Sathien Setthasit, Chairman of Carabao Group, acquired a majority stake and renamed the company to CJ Express Group.

== Brands ==
Under the new "CJ MORE" business model announced on November 11, 2020, the company operates the following brands under the "More Than Anyone, More Than Supermarket" concept:

=== CJ Supermarket ===
The company's original retail brand, focusing on household staples. Known for having a wide variety of items at competitive prices, with their hypermarket-level pricing and convenience store availability. First rounds of expansions were mostly in Central Thailand, such as Nakhon Pathom, Ratchaburi,Kanchanaburi, Suphan Buri, Chon Buri and Bangkok.

=== CJX ===
Hybrid retail-wholesale with items similar to CJ Supermarket, plus club pack/wholesale options in the same store.

=== Nine Beauty ===
Multi-brand cosmetics zone, within the supermarket itself. Provides cosmetics, skin care products and dietary supplements.

=== Bao Café ===
Fresh coffee under the "Good taste, good price" concept, with local touches at an affordable price. Other non-coffee drinks are available in a wide variety as well, with their rich taste and served with toasts.

=== UNO ===
Lifestyle and fashion items, stationery and electronics with modern design under the "Your Innovation" concept, targeting working-age people looking for daily items

=== A-Home ===
Home improvement zone for home owners ranging from D.I.Y. items, hand tools, gardening equipment, plumbing tools, car care products, kitchen appliances all the way to small electrical appliances.

=== PET HUB ===
Pet shop with a wide variety of pet-related goods such as pet food, treats, and toys. Covers dogs, cats, birds and aquatic animals.

=== Tian Tian ===
Ice cream and milk tea brand at affordable prices, similar to MIXUE, Ai-CHA and WEDRINK while being a 100% Thai brand despite Chinese-sounding name.

Apart from these notable brands, CJ MORE also operates Bao Wash automatic laundry shops and CJ MORE Food Hall at select branches.
