= Wesco =

Wesco is the name of several companies in the United States:

- WESCO International, an electrical distribution company based in Pittsburgh, Pennsylvania
- Wesco Financial, a diversified financial corporation based in Pasadena, California
- West Coast Shoe Company, maker of Wesco work boots, based in Scappoose, Oregon
- WESCO oil, an oil company in West Michigan

It also refers to Wesco in Germany (formerly Westermann & Co), founded 1867.

== Surname ==
- Bryant Wesco (born 2005), American football player
