= Quick Pack Food Mart =

Convenience store and restaurant in Seattle, Washington, U.S.

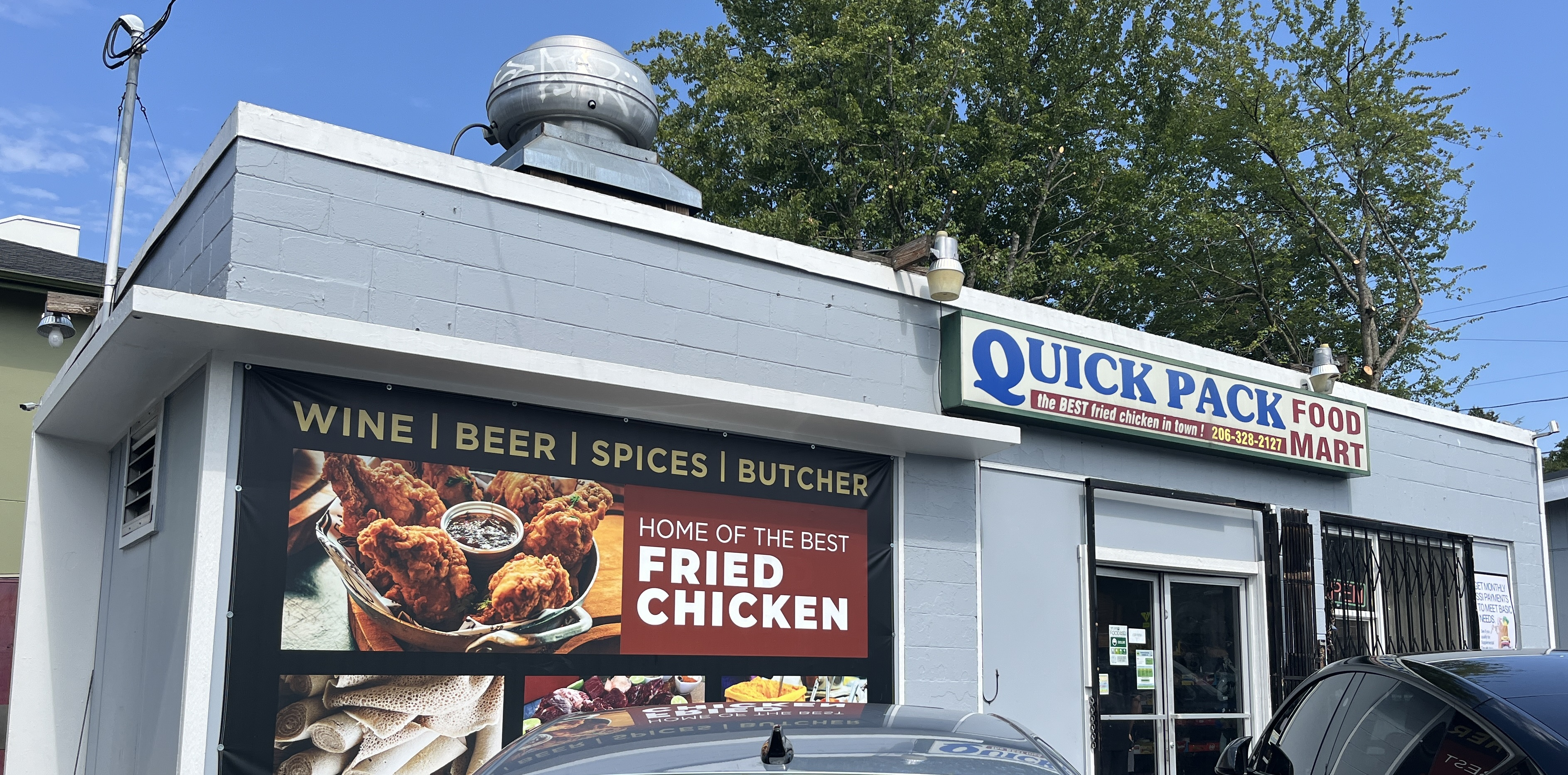
- The store's exterior in 2024
- Interactive map of Quick Pack Food Mart

Restaurant information
- Location: 2616 South Jackson Street, Seattle, King, Washington, 98144, United States
- Coordinates: 47.5995°N 122.2978°W

Quick Pack Food Mart is a convenience store and fried chicken restaurant in Seattle's Central District, in the U.S. state of Washington. The Black-owned business has garnered a positive reception for its fried chicken, jojos, and samosas.

== Description ==
Quick Pack Food Mart is a convenience store and fried chicken restaurant at the intersection of Martin Luther King Jr. Way and South Jackson Street in the Central District. In addition to fried chicken, the menu includes jojos (potato wedges) made from Russet potatoes as well as samosas filled with rice. There is no seating available.

The Black-owned shop used to have a sign with a typo that read "Seattle's Best Friend Chicken".

== Reception ==
In 2020, during the COVID-19 pandemic, Eater Seattle's included Quick Pack in a list of the city's best fried chicken options for delivery or take-out. Jade Yamazaki Stewart included Quick Pack in the website's 2022 list of sixteen restaurants for "knockout" fried chicken in the Seattle metropolitan area. She wrote, "When fresh out of the fryer, the oversized wings and juicy thighs at this unassuming convenience store rival the best birds in the city." Stewart and Meg van Huygen included Quick Pack in a 2024 overview of recommended restaurants for "affordable, delicious" food in the city and said the business was among Seattle's best fried chicken restaurants. Stewart and Gabe Guarente also included the business in a 2024 list of fourteen restaurants for "stellar" wings in Seattle, writing: "Given the breakneck pace of development in the Central District, here's hoping Quick Pack is a holdout for years to come. You won't find an extensive menu at this unassuming convenience store, but you will find oversized, well-seasoned, shockingly good wings, a fantastic grab-and-go snack when they're fresh out of the fryer." Eater Seattle's 2024 list of 38 "essential" restaurants in the city says, "we challenge you to find a better way to spend $3 than buying a drumstick here". The website also recommended, "A couple pieces makes great road trip comfort food; a dozen pieces is a Sunday dinner."

Thrillist has called the fried chicken "delicious". Jake Uitti ranked Quick Pack second in The Stranger's overview of Seattle's best fried chicken and said eating there "was a glorious experience; damn near out of a Rockwell painting". In 2018, Chason Gordon of Seattle Magazine wrote, "Quick Pack is your prototypical hidden gem. They don't house 'The best fried chicken in town!' like their confident sign says, but if you're in the area, it's worth a visit." In 2020, The Infatuation's Aimee Rizzo said Quick Pack was "rumored" to have some of the city's best fried chicken. She and Kayla Sager-Riley included the business in a 2024 overview of Seattle's fourteen best restaurants for chicken wings.

== See also ==
- Alberta Market, convenience store and fried chicken restaurant in Portland, Oregon
- List of Black-owned restaurants
- List of chicken restaurants
- List of convenience stores
