= Auto restaurant =

Japanese rest area facility

An auto restaurant is a rest area facility found in Japan, equipped with food counters and vending machines. In many cases it is unmanned and it is open 24 hours a day, but the facilities that include an, amusement arcade may have established business hours. Some locations have bathing facilities such as public baths or onsen.

== History ==
Suburban type shops along the national highways of Japan developed for customers who eat at midnight, such as the truck drivers of the 1970s. Initially, the range of foods available at the vending machines included hamburgers, cup noodle, and Japanese curry dishes. They were prepared in a microwave oven or used hot water from an integrated water heater. Later, vending machines appeared that could automatically cook enriched meals with variations such as tempura, soba, and udon. There is also a sit down drive-in.

In 1978, the video game Space Invaders appeared, and then a fusion of the auto restaurant and the suburban game center at its peak. However, during the 1980s, when the 24-hour convenience store and fast food stores increased all over the country, it was possible to procure meals without relying on vending machines even at midnight. As a result, automatic vending machines that are complex and difficult to maintain became obsolete. Due to public security problems, the number of stores quickly fell.

Thereafter, business types like the Automatic Super Delis at ampm convenience stores, in which convenience chains set up vending machines for lunch and drinks at offices and the like also appeared. Moreover, in parking areas along expressways, there were increasing cases of abolishing the shops / light snack corner or making it unmanned, and there are increasing cases to shift to this form, and parking areas with only the toilet.
