= 8 à Huit =

French convenience store chain

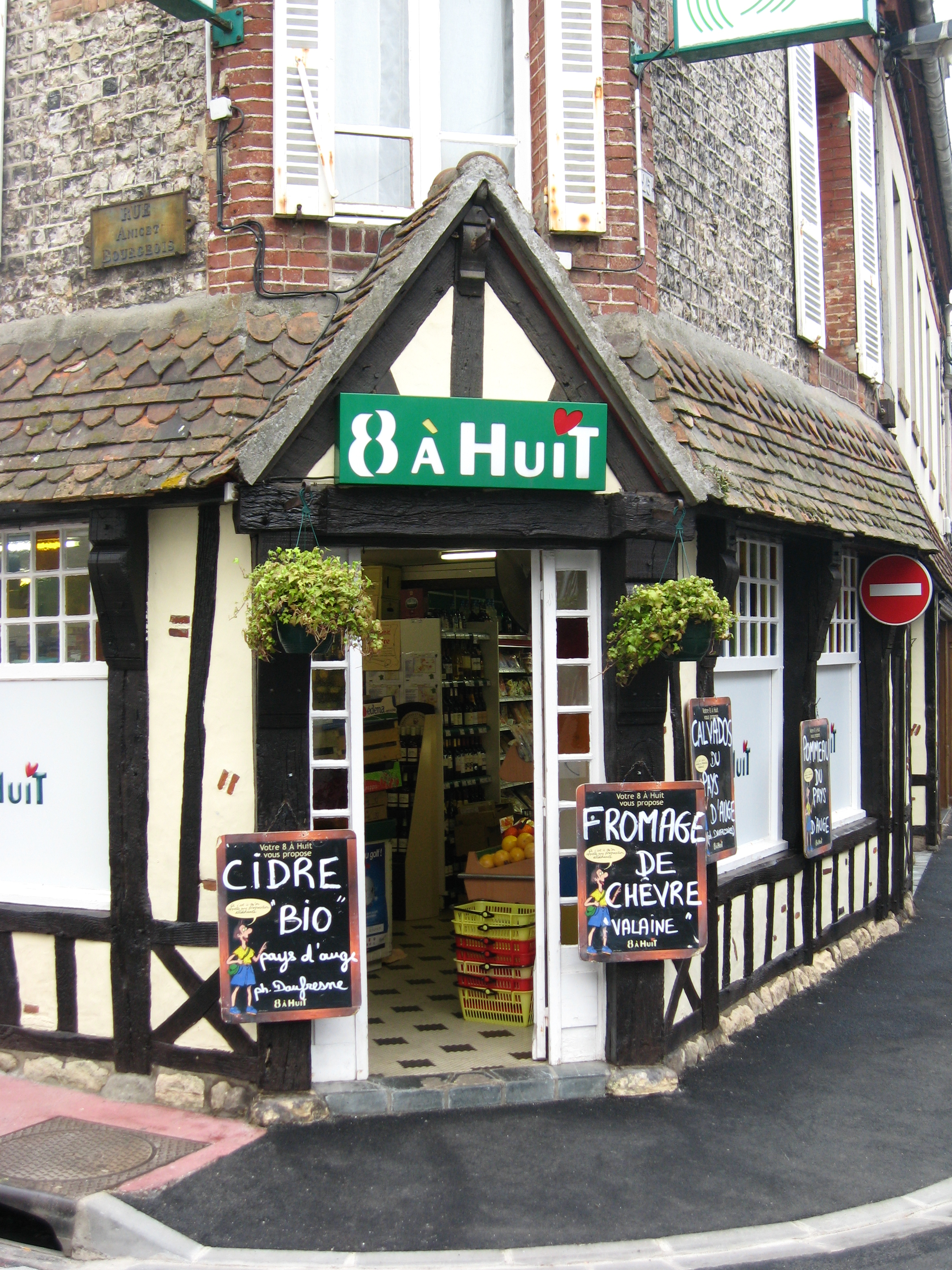
A store 8 in Huit in Étretat, France.

8 à Huit is a chain of supermarkets and convenience stores based in France. Founded in 1977, the company has been a subsidiary of the French supermarket chain Carrefour since 1999. As the name implies, stores are typically open from 8:00 A.M. to 8:00 P.M. local time.

== See also ==
- List of convenience stores
