= NewsLink =

Australian travel retail company

NewsLink Pty Ltd
- Type: Travel Retail
- Industry: Retail
- Founded: 1990
- Headquarters: Sydney, Australia
- Products: Travel Products, Press, Convenience Items, Books, Music
- Website: http://www.newslink.com.au/

NewsLink Pty Ltd (or LS travel retail Asia Pacific - formerly known as Lagardère Services Asia Pacific) is an Australian retail company that sells convenience items and travel products in airports and railway stations in Australia, China, Hong Kong, Singapore, Taiwan, and Fiji.

== History ==
NewsLink began in 1990 when its founder, Roger Wood obtained the rights to operate the newsagency concessions at railway stations in Sydney, Australia.

In 1994 NewsLink expanded into its first airport operations. The growth and potential of the business was soon recognised, and Newslink became the first company chosen by R. M. Williams and Australian Geographic to represent their brands in travel retail.

In 2000 NewsLink joined Times the Bookshop and opened the first TimesNewsLink store at Singapore Changi Airport in Singapore.

NewsLink became part of Hachette Distribution Services (HDS) in 2001. HDS is a worldwide company that operates an international network of media and entertainment stores and is owned by French conglomerate Lagardere. Newslink now falls under the Lagardere Service corporate umbrella.

== Brands ==
NewsLink operates a number of chains of retail outlets, including:

- NewsLink: Newspapers, Magazines, Books, Gifts, Drinks and Snacks
- Icons: Gourmet Traveller books and magazines, Gourmet Foods, Wine, and Spirits
- RELAY: Books, Newspapers, Magazines, Gifts, and Souvenirs
- Hub Convenience: Convenience Items - Snacks and Drinks
- TimesNewsLink: Books, and Magazines
- Kaboom: Children's Toys, Games, Educational products, activity packs, Books, Multimedia and Confectionery.
- Bijoux Terner: Everything is $20 - Watches, Sunglasses, Costume Jewellery, Silk Ties, Handbags, Scarves, and various other accessories.
- Discover: Australian gifts and souvenirs
- Watermark: Books with integrated Cafe

== See also ==
- List of convenience stores
