= EddieWorld =

American convenience store chain

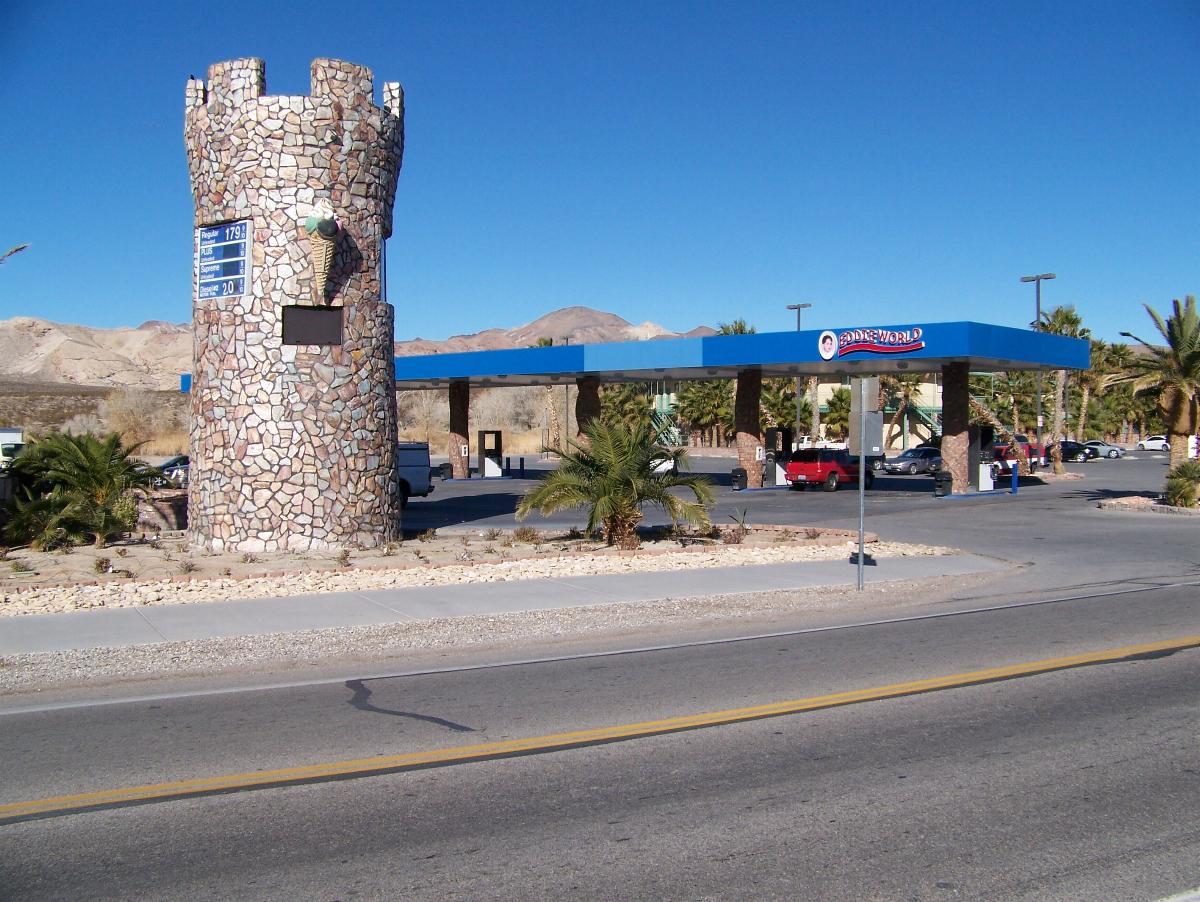
- EddieWorld in Beatty, Nevada
- Company type: Private
- Industry: Convenience store; Gas station; Electric vehicle charging; Fast food
- Founded: 2001; 25 years ago Beatty, Nevada as Death Valley Nut and Candy Company
- Founders: Ed Ringle
- Number of locations: 2
- Area served: Nevada and California
- Products: Candy, snacks, beverages, hot meals, merchandise, and fuel
- Website: eddieworld.com

EddieWorld is a small American chain of convenience stores and gas stations. Founded in 2001 in Beatty, Nevada as the Death Valley Nut and Candy Company, there are currently two EddieWorld locations—the original in Nevada and another in California.

== History ==
The Death Valley Nut and Candy Company was established in 2001 by Ed Ringle in Beatty, Nevada, near Death Valley, serving travelers along the U.S. 95 corridor to the valley and between Reno and Las Vegas. The store, eventually branding itself as EddieWorld, gradually added a gas station and Tesla Supercharger and ChargePoint EV chargers. Inside the store includes snacks and candy sold under the Death Valley Nut and Candy Company brand as well as imported snacks, an array of souvenirs and toys, and small shops within the building, such as a café, Subway, and Jedidiah's Jerky.

EddieWorld, now owned by Ed Ringle's son Alex, opened a second location strategically placed between Los Angeles and Las Vegas along Interstate 15 in Yermo, California on January 8, 2018, with a gas station and EV chargers outside the store and a Peet's Coffee, Jedidiah's Jerky, and Calico Pizzeria on the inside. With 26 fuel pumps and a 27,000 sq ft (2,500 m^{2}) convenience store, it is the largest gas station in the state. Also noted are the novelties throughout the premises, such as a 3D printer that makes custom gummy candy, a minigame system above the urinals in the men's restroom controlled by urinating in the toilet, and a 65-foot tall (20 m) water tank by the parking lot decorated to resemble an ice cream sundae.

== See also ==
- Buc-ee's, an American convenience store and gas station often compared to EddieWorld for similar novelties
