= Shipley Energy =

American energy company

- Type: Private
- Industry: Home heating, natural gas
- Founded: 1929
- Founder: Bill Shipley III
- Headquarters: York, Pennsylvania, U.S.
- Key people: William Shipley III, CEO 2012–2016 Chairman (incumbent); David Gruno, CEO; Richard Beamesderfer, CFO
- Products: Heating oil, natural gas, propane
- Website: www.shipleyenergy.com

Shipley Energy is a heating and cooling company headquartered in York, Pennsylvania. It provides energy to residential and commercial customers, in the Mid-Atlantic region of the United States, in the form of heating oil, propane, natural gas and electricity for residential customers, as well as kerosene, biodiesel and fuel oil to commercial customers, for buildings, machinery and fleets. The company also installs and services heating and cooling equipment, for both residential and commercial customers.

== Services offered ==
=== Residential services ===
Residential services offered:

- Electricity supply
- Natural gas
- Propane heating
- Oil heating
- HVAC services
- Cooling electricity installations

=== Commercial services ===
Commercial services offered:

- Energy fleet
- Fueling service
- Wholesale fuels
- Equipment transport trucking

== Shipley Group ==
Shipley Energy is a company of the Shipley Group. Other companies in the group:

- Shipley Fuels Marketing, is the wholesale fuel sister company of Shipley Energy. It offers fuel from most major refiners serving the Mid Atlantic Region, including biodiesel and bio-heating oil, heating oil, kerosene, diesel, NRLM and gasoline, both branded and unbranded. Services include: inventory monitoring, daily quoting, pump and gravity off-loading, and delivery.
- Seth Energy, a Shipley Energy Company, provides HVAC services, heating oil, and propane to Lancaster and Chester counties, Pennsylvania.
- Tom’s Stores and Travel Centers, are a chain of gas station and convenience stores based in York, Pennsylvania. The company currently has eight locations in central Pennsylvania.
- Solar Secured Solutions, provides a solar run security system, for protecting trailers and other portable property, including explosives, and also offers the FuelQue product, a fuel monitoring system.

Shipley Energy also owns and operates three franchises of the Atlanta-based Arby's Restaurants chain, in conjunction with Tom’s Travel Centers.
