= Sathien Setthasit =

Thai billionaire

Sathien Sathientham (previously known as Sathien Setthasit) is a Thai billionaire. He made his fortune from Carabao Energy Drink, which he co-founded in 2002 with Aed Carabao. He resides primarily in Bangkok.
