= Thorntons LLC =

American convenience store chain based in Kentucky

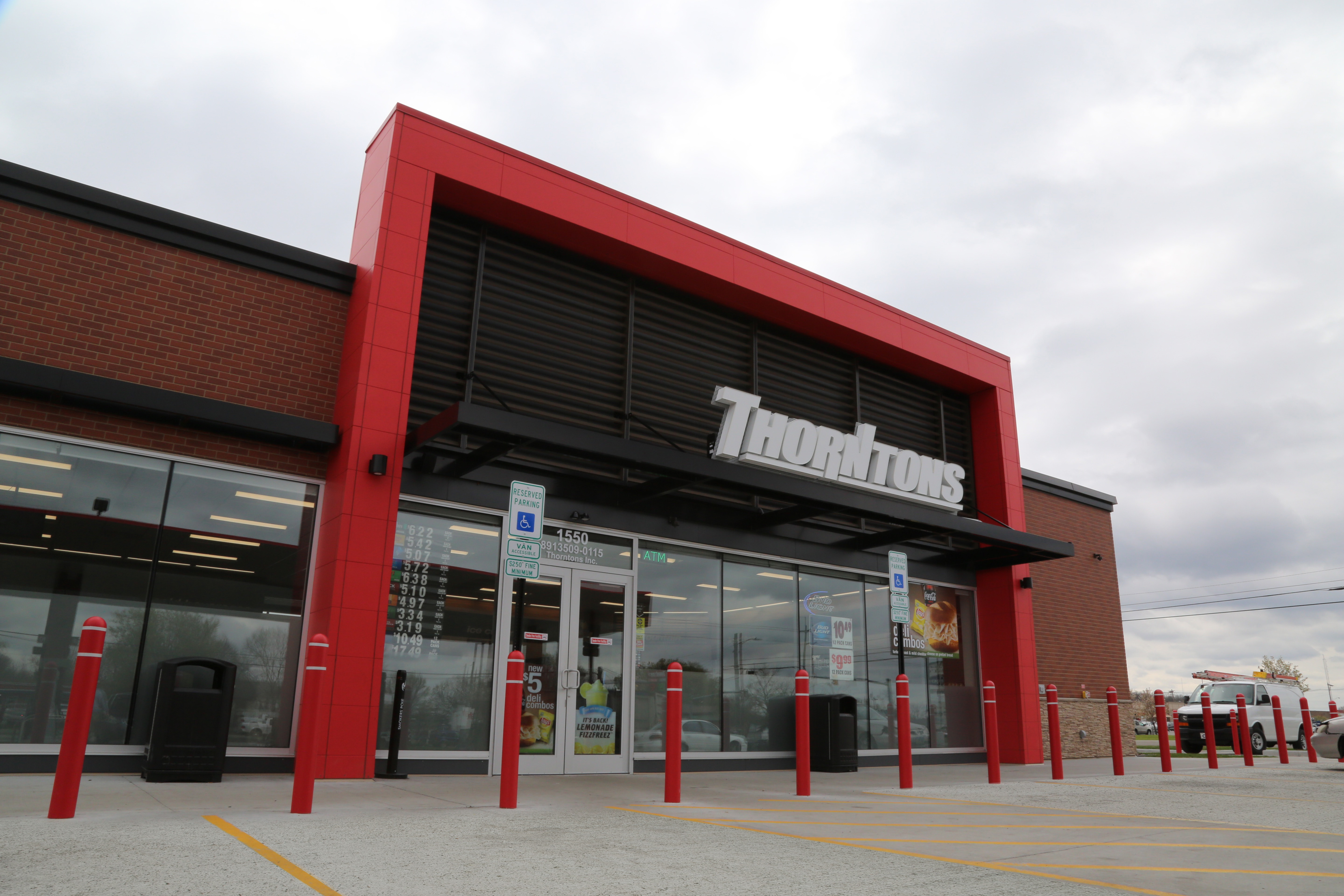
- Thorntons store in Hamilton, Ohio
- Type: Subsidiary
- Industry: Convenience store; Gas station; Fast food
- Founded: 1971
- Founder: James Thornton
- Headquarters: Louisville, Kentucky, United States
- Number of locations: 200+ (2024)
- Area served: Florida, Illinois, Indiana, Kentucky, Ohio, Tennessee
- Products: Prepared foods, snacks, beverages, coffee, fuel
- Number of employees: 4,700
- Parent: BP
- Website: www.mythorntons.com

Thorntons LLC, formerly Thorntons Inc., is an American gasoline and convenience store chain headquartered in Louisville, Kentucky. It operates 200+ locations which vary from traditional fuel and convenience stores, stores with expanded kitchen formats and Travel Centers. Thorntons stores are located in six states: Florida, Illinois, Indiana, Kentucky, Ohio and Tennessee. Founded in 1971 by James Thornton, it is a subsidiary of BP.

== History ==
The first Thorntons location opened in 1971 in Clarksville, Indiana. The original site featured a kiosk building and a full-service attendant. In the 1980s, Thorntons transitioned from kiosk locations to convenience stores and grew to over 100 locations.

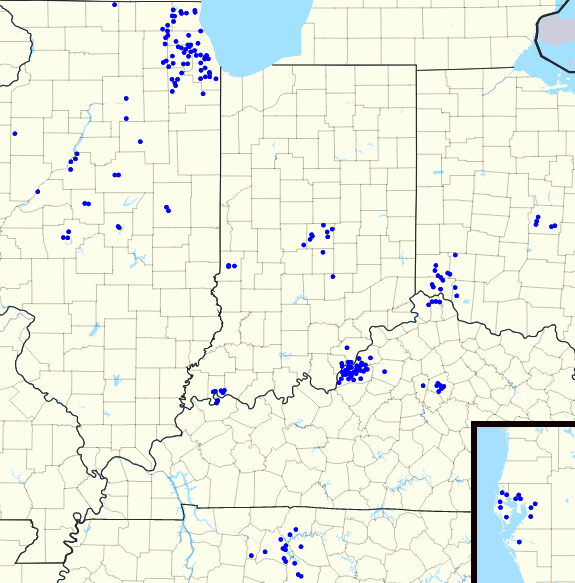
Thorntons locations map as of January 2020

In 2013, Thorntons introduced a larger store model with an expanded food program in select Louisville, Kentucky and Southern Indiana stores. In 2016, this platform was expanded in select Chicago metropolitan area stores.

Around the same time frame, Thorntons rolled out Unleaded15 fuel which provides an octane rating of 88 and contains approximately 15% ethanol. Certain Thorntons locations also offer E85.

In 2019, Thorntons was acquired by a joint venture between Arclight Capital Partners and BP. In July 2021, BP agreed terms to acquire ArcLight Capital Partners' shareholding. The transaction was completed on August 31, 2021. BP retained the Thorntons brand, making it a sister chain to BP-owned ampm; the two chains do not overlap.
