= Petro Express =

Petro Express was a multi-store convenience chain based in Charlotte, North Carolina. Their stores were located in Mecklenburg County, North Carolina, and neighboring counties. On January 9, 2007 The Pantry, Inc. of Sanford, North Carolina announced that it would be buying the 66 Petro Express stores. After the acquisition by The Pantry, Inc., it was announced that all Petro Express locations would sell Chevron's Texaco brand gasoline.
