= Carabao Energy Drink =

Thai energy drink

- Type: Energy drink
- Manufacturer: Carabao Group
- Origin: Thailand
- Introduced: 2002; 24 years ago
- Website: www.carabao.co.th

Carabao Energy Drink, also known as Carabao Dang (Thai: คาราบาวแดง; RTGS: kharabao daeng; lit. 'red water buffalo'), is a Thai energy drink brand launched in 2002 by Carabao Tawandang Co Ltd. It is now Thailand's second most popular energy drink, after Krating Daeng. It is the key brand of Carabao Tawandang in Thailand, with an estimated 21 percent market share in 2014.

The name "Carabao Dang" comes from the Carabao Group's association with the band Carabao, combined with the German Tawandang Brewery Restaurant. It is marketed with the slogan "Carabao Dang: The Fighting Spirit".

The drink's launch was accompanied by a high-profile TV advertising campaign featuring the company founder (along with Sathien Setthasit), rock star Yuenyong Opakul, also known as Aed Carabao. This campaign was investigated by the Office of the Consumer Protection Board for being too violent, but went on to win a gold and a silver medal at Media & Marketing magazine's Asian Brand Marketing Effectiveness Awards in 2003.

In 2004 the drink was introduced to Europe and the United States. Exports to China and India began in 2007. Carabao was introduced in Australia at the beginning of 2018.

== Market and share ==
The market for energy drinks in Thailand is estimated at 35 billion baht in 2018. Carabao research indicates that more than eight million Thais consume energy drinks. Nineteen percent live in Bangkok, 32 percent in other urban areas and 49 percent in rural provinces. Carabao Group expects 2018 revenues to reach 15 billion baht, up from 13 billion baht in 2017.

== Production ==
Carabao Energy Drink is manufactured by Carabao Tawandang Co., Ltd. at the company's integrated production complex in Bang Pakong District, Chachoengsao Province, Thailand. The facility comprises beverage bottling and canning plants, as well as glass bottle and aluminium can manufacturing facilities. According to Krones, the Bang Pakong complex operates eight Krones production lines, including a canning line installed in 2021 with a capacity of up to 74,000 cans per hour. The facility produces approximately two billion beverage containers annually for distribution in Thailand and export to more than 40 countries.

== Sponsorship ==
In 2015, Carabao began expanding its brand presence in the United Kingdom by becoming the front-of-shirt sponsor of Reading F.C. for the 2015–16 EFL Championship season, supporting the brand's entry into the European market.

Later that year, Carabao signed a three-year agreement to become the Principal Partner of Chelsea F.C., beginning with the 2016–17 season. The partnership included the club's training kit sponsorship and a range of commercial and marketing activities aimed at strengthening Carabao's international brand presence.

In 2017, Carabao became the title sponsor of the English Football League Cup, which was subsequently renamed the Carabao Cup. The initial sponsorship agreement covered three seasons.

In 2020, Carabao expanded its football sponsorship activities in Scotland by becoming the Official Energy Drink Partner of Heart of Midlothian F.C. and Hibernian F.C. for the 2020–21 season.

In 2023, Carabao became the principal sponsor of Hoàng Anh Gia Lai F.C. in Vietnam's V.League 1 and returned as the Official Sports Drink Partner of Reading F.C.

In 2026, the sponsorship agreement for the Carabao Cup was extended until the end of the 2028–29 season, making Carabao the longest-serving title sponsor in the competition's history.

In addition to club and competition sponsorships, Carabao has supported grassroots football development in Thailand through initiatives such as Carabao Coach the Coaches, delivered in partnership with the English Football League (EFL), as well as the Carabao 7-a-Side Cup and Carabao Grassroots Football programmes, which promote youth coaching and community football participation.
