= VkusVill =

Russian grocery store chain

Vkusvill

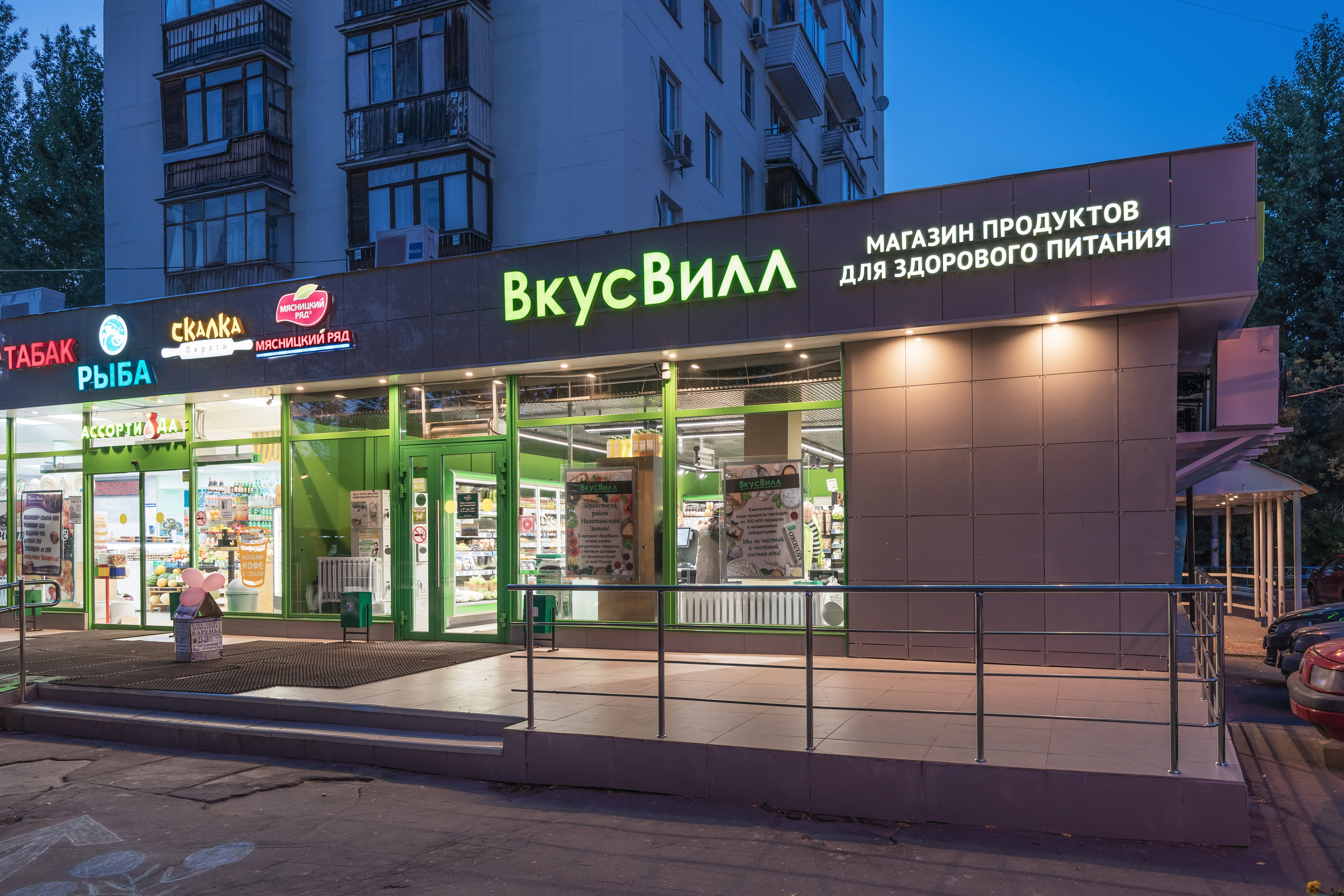
- A location in Moscow, Russia
- Native name: Вкусвилл
- Type: Joint-stock company
- Industry: grocery store
- Founded: 2009
- Founder: Krivenko Andrey Aleksanderovich
- Revenue: 34,041,642,000 Russian ruble (2020)
- Operating income: 3,250,233,000 Russian ruble (2020)
- Net income: 951,731,000 Russian ruble (2020)
- Total assets: 48,836,032,000 Russian ruble (2020)
- Website: https://vkusvill.ru/

Vkusvill (Russian: Вкусвилл, lit. 'Tasteville') is a Russian food retail chain founded by Andrey Krivenko in 2012 in Moscow. As of March 2023, VkusVill has more than 1,350 stores in 72 Russian cities.

== History ==
In 2009 Krivenko opened the first store "Izbenka", which sold fresh dairy products. By 2012 the chain consisted of 140 stores in Moscow and the Moscow Oblast.

In 2012 the first stores of the VkusVill chain were opened, which, in addition to dairy products, also sold groceries.

In 2020, the first Vkusvill store abroad was opened in Amsterdam. However, this project was not successful and was closed in 2022.

In November 2022 the company announced the start of sales of products in China.

Plans to list VkusVill on Nasdaq and Moscow Exchange were canceled in 2022 due to Russia's invasion of Ukraine.

In March 2023 Vkusvill launched food sales in Dubai through the YallaMarket app. In November 2023 it became known about the purchase by Vkusvill of the Anderson cafe chain.

In April 2024 Vkusvill opened a store in the city of Alma-Ata (Kazakhstan).

== Ownership ==
The founder of the network, Andrey Krivenko, through JSC "Evolutionary Goal" owns LLC "Izbenka Project", which, in turn, owns 86.05% of JSC "Vkusvill", and another 1.79% of shares directly. The Baring Vostok structure owns 12.16% of the retailer's shares.
