= Peter J. Sodini =

American business executive

Peter J. Sodini was the president and chief executive officer of The Pantry, Inc. (NASDAQ: PTRY), purportedly the leading independently operated convenience store chain in the Southeastern U.S., from June 1996 to September 2009. He became chairman of The Pantry's board effective February 2006.

== Career ==
He previously served as chief operating officer from February 1996 until June 1996. Prior to his positions with The Pantry, Sodini was chief executive officer and a director of Purity Supreme, Inc. from December 1991 through February 1996. Prior to 1991, Sodini held executive positions at several supermarket chains, including Boys Markets, Inc. and Piggly Wiggly Southern, Inc.

Sodini announced in April 2009 that he was going to retire from The Pantry when his contract expired at the end of September 2009. Sodini commented, "I have now spent over ten years with The Pantry, and am proud of what we have accomplished. Ultimately, however, the Board and I discussed the Company`s succession plan and we decided now was the right time to implement it. I look forward to working with the Board to assure a seamless transition and I continue to remain enthusiastic about the Company`s opportunities and prospects in the years to come."

== Compensation ==
While CEO of The Pantry in 2008, Sodini earned a total compensation of $1,861,974, which included a base salary of $800,000; a cash bonus of $352,590, options granted of $586,673; and other compensation of $122,711.
