= Ampm =

US multinational convenience store chain

ampm
- Logo since 2016

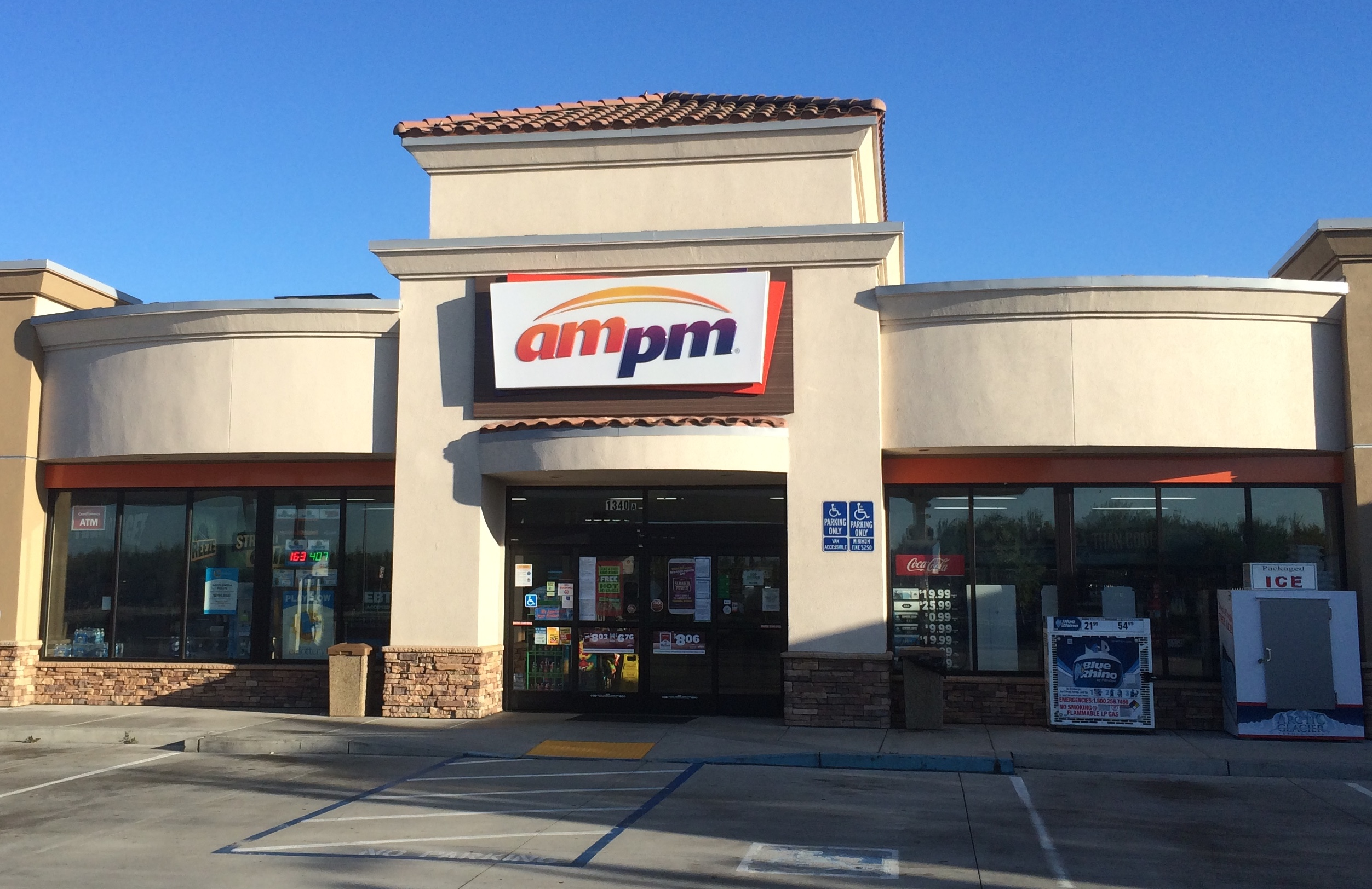
- An ampm outlet in Ripon, California, 2020
- Company type: Subsidiary
- Industry: Franchising
- Founded: 1978; 48 years ago
- Founder: Atlantic Richfield Company
- Parent: BP
- Website: ampm.com

ampm (rarely "am/pm") is an American convenience store chain with branches operating in Arizona, California, Nevada, Oregon, Washington and in several countries such as Costa Rica and Brazil. The brand pulled out of the Eastern United States in 2012, but returned a decade later with an outlet opening in The Bronx, New York City.

The ampm brand is owned by BP America, Inc., a subsidiary of BP, which acquired its founding owner, Atlantic Richfield Company (ARCO), in 2000. In the United States, the stores are usually attached to an ARCO or BP-branded gas station. The first location opened in Southern California in 1978.

== History ==
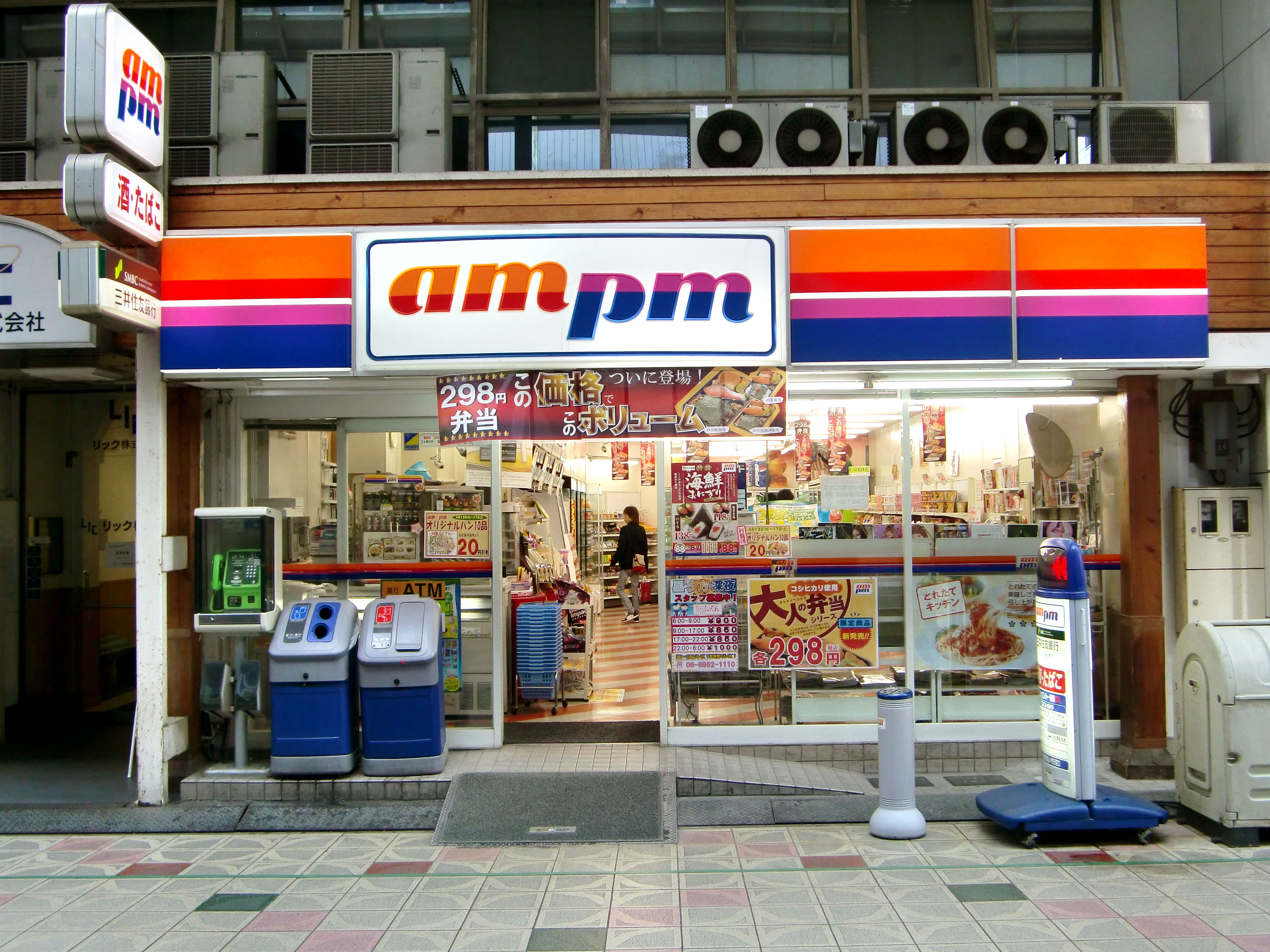
A former ampm in Osaka, Japan

=== 1978–2007 ===
ampm is owned by a subsidiary of BP, which acquired its founding owner, Atlantic Richfield Company (ARCO), in 2000. The first ampm location opened in Southern California in 1978. The chain would also have a presence in the Northeastern United States at ARCO locations until ARCO spun those operations off into Atlantic Petroleum in 1985, with those stores being rebranded as A-Plus. A-Plus remains owned by Sunoco (which acquired Atlantic in 1988), though all the company-owned stores were sold to 7-Eleven in 2018.

The Japanese chain was originally established by Kyodo Oil Company (later Japan Energy) in 1989; many of its stores are located within Kyodo Oil (later JOMO) filling stations. It remained under Japan Energy control until it was sold to Reins International Inc, an operator of Korean-style restaurants in Japan, in 2004. It became a wholly owned subsidiary of FamilyMart in 2009. Subsequently, am/pm stores were converted into FamilyMart stores.

=== 2008–2011: BP Connect branding ===
In spring 2008, U.S. branches of the BP Connect brand of convenience stores rebranded to ampm, which also brought the brand under the BP banner after exclusively being under the ARCO banner. The decision saw markets with a large BP presence, such as Chicago, Cleveland, Indianapolis, Orlando, and Pittsburgh, face rebranding as ampm stores and TV ads. In August 2008, BP announced its decision to sell the majority of its retail operations in the Orlando area to Apopka-based Medallion Convenience Stores. Also in 2008, the Indianapolis stores were sold to Ricker Oil, which began operating them under the BP/Ricker's identity; those stores are now owned and operated by GetGo. The Pittsburgh area stores were sold to 7-Eleven; the stores alongside 7-Eleven's later acquisition of ampm spinoff A-Plus supplemented 7-Eleven's legacy locations in the area usually branded with Exxon or Gulf. The Columbus, Ohio, locations were sold to locally based Duchess Shoppe in 2010. In November 2009, FamilyMart announced its acquisition of am/pm Japan. All ampm stores in Japan then subsequently rebranded as FamilyMart.

=== 2012–2023 ===
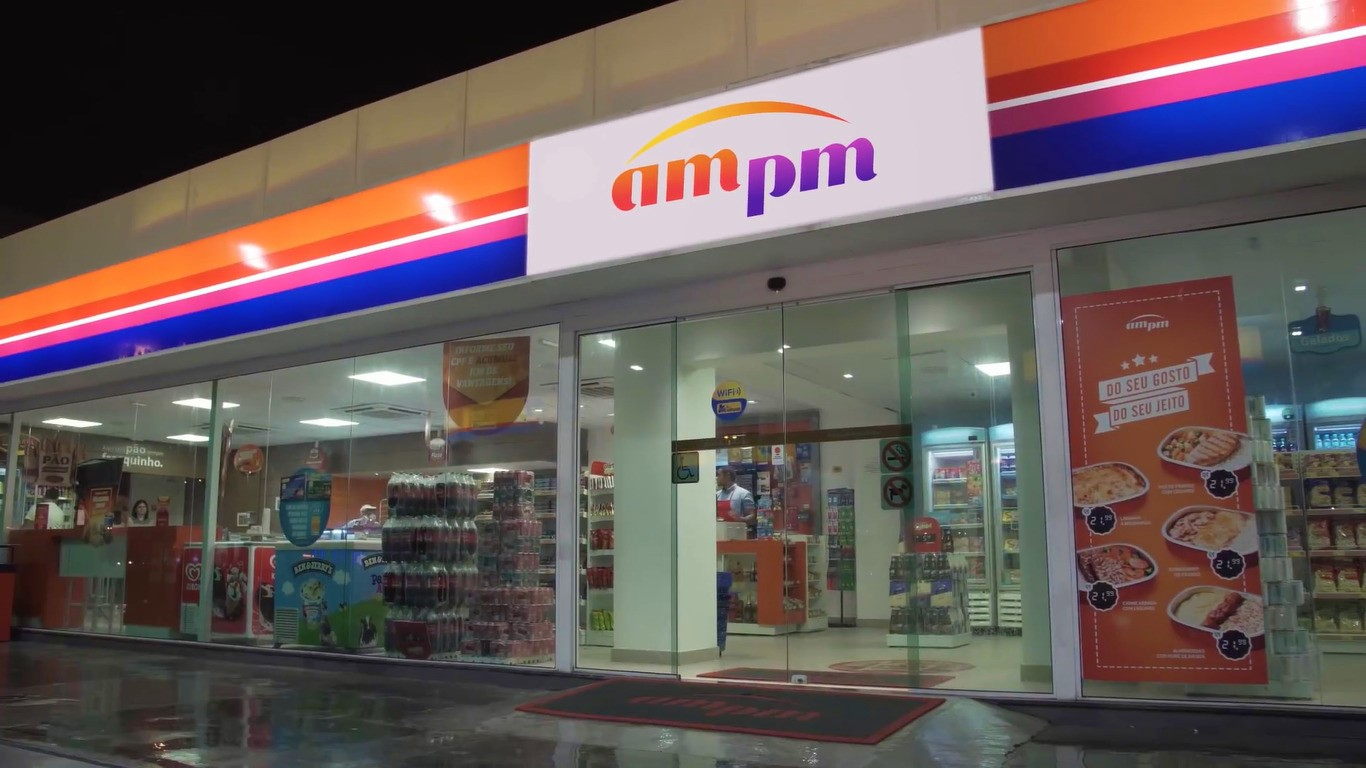
An ampm store in Rio de Janeiro, Brazil

In 2012, in Costa Rica, both ampm and Fresh Market stores were owned by the same company. By the end of that year, there were 38 ampm locations in the country. In August 2012 it was reported that BP had divested, or was planning to divest, all ampm operations East of the Rockies. In 2012, BP announced it would withdraw ampm stores from the eastern US by the end of that year, naming specifically Atlanta, Chicago, Cincinnati, Cleveland, and Orlando. At the time, there were 200 ampm convenience stores in BP fuel outlets in the eastern US, with 900 locations in the western US alongside BP and ARCO outlets. This occurred around the same time that BP divested ARCO itself to Tesoro Corporation and licensed the ARCO name from Tesoro for the Pacific Northwest and Northern California while retaining ownership of ampm. As of 2021, BP franchises ampm to independent ARCO owners in the Southwest United States, though company-owned ampm stores in the area converted to Speedway following Marathon Petroleum's purchase of ARCO in 2018.

In 2014, the brand was focusing on food such as "coffee, bakery, fresh sandwiches and hot foods, along with an extensive condiment bar," as well as fountain drinks and refrigerated display cases. It had a value line, "ampm Good Stuff." ampm had 950 stores overall, with headquarters in La Palma, California, and operations in five states: Arizona, California, Nevada, Oregon, Washington. ampm was nearing its 1,000th location by November 2017. In early 2019, BP had "recently opened its first new-to-industry ampm site" in 12 years, marking the company's 1,000th ampm location in a BP outlet. In May 2019, Ipiranga was operating ampm stores in Brazil, with 2,500 ampm stores at gas stations in the country.

In 2019, BP acquired an ownership stake in rival chain Thorntons LLC, and in 2021 announced it would acquire full ownership from partner ArcLight Capital Partners. The deal would make ampm and Thorntons sister chains, though BP plans to keep operations separate. With Thorntons being primarily in the Midwestern United States and Florida, the two chains do not overlap geographically.

In August 2022, BP opened their first East Coast ampm convenience store in the New York City borough of The Bronx. It also marked the first time the West Coast chain had a presence in the Eastern United States since pulling out in 2012. A second New York City location opened in Queens in 2023.

== Dispersion ==
With the division of ARCO between BP and Tesoro, West Coast franchising rights were split between BP (Washington, Oregon and Northern California) and Tesoro subsidiary company Treasure Franchise Company LLC (Arizona, Nevada, Utah and Southern California).

Franchised and BP-owned units of ampm are also found in parts of Mexico, usually co-located with a Pemex (which is the main provider of gas in the country) and in Brazil usually, with an Ipiranga station. In Argentina they could be found in YPF/ACA stations. In Chile they formerly operated on Petrobras stations

== See also ==
- List of companies of Japan
- List of convenience stores
