= The Pantry =

Convenience store chain

The Pantry Inc.
- Company type: Publicly traded company
- Traded as: Nasdaq: PTRY
- Industry: Convenience store chain
- Founded: 1967; 59 years ago
- Defunct: 2015; 11 years ago
- Fate: Acquired by Alimentation Couche-Tard, with most stores rebranded as Circle K
- Headquarters: Cary, North Carolina, United States
- Number of locations: 1,537
- Area served: Southeast United States
- Key people: Dennis Hatchell (CEO)

The Pantry, Inc. (Nasdaq: PTRY) was a publicly traded convenience store chain based in Cary, North Carolina that operated Kangaroo Express stores. The Pantry was founded in 1967 by Sam Wornom and Truby Proctor, Jr. in Sanford, North Carolina The company has been publicly traded since June 1999 and owned by investors since 1987, when then investor Montrose Capital purchased controlling shares from Wornom and Proctor. Recent CEOs have included the former chairman of the board and interim CEO Edwin J. Holman, who took over after Terrance M. Marks, the former president and CEO, resigned in December 2011. (Marks had replaced the longtime former CEO Peter Sodini who had held office since 1996 until retiring in September 2009.) Dennis Hatchell was the CEO of the company as of 2012.

The Pantry was one of the United States' largest convenience store chains and the leading independently operated chain in the southeastern U.S. As of September 29, 2014, the company operated 1,518 stores in thirteen states under several banners, including its primary operating banner Kangaroo Express. States include Alabama, Florida, Georgia, Indiana, Kansas, Kentucky, Louisiana, Mississippi, Missouri, North Carolina, South Carolina, Tennessee, and Virginia.

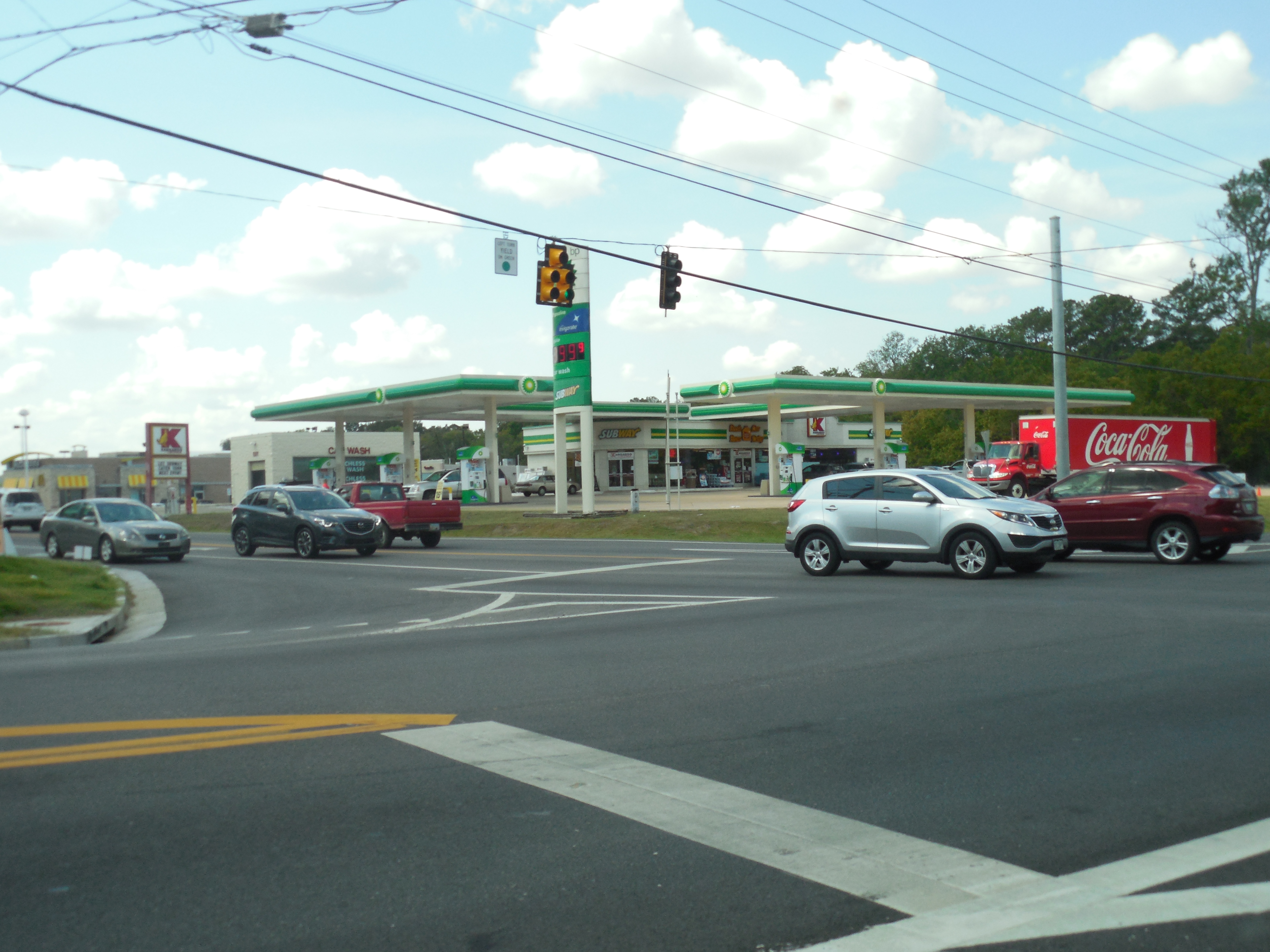
BP Gas Station with a Kangaroo Express store

On December 18, 2014, Quebec based Alimentation Couche-Tard, the parent company of Circle K, announced its plans to acquire The Pantry for $860 million (~$1.12 billion in 2024) all cash tender. The acquisition was completed in March 2015, increasing Couche-Tard's presence in the Southeast and Gulf Coast. Most Kangaroo Express stores were converted to Circle K stores. Couche-Tard later began to trial a revival of the Kangaroo Express banner for use as a franchise brand.

== Overview ==
The Pantry was the largest independently operated convenience store chain in the southeastern United States. It expanded rapidly during the late 1980s into the 2000s through various acquisitions. In 2008, it was announced that all Pantry stores would be rebranded under its primary operating banner, Kangaroo Express. In 2009, the company moved its headquarters from Sanford, North Carolina, to Cary, North Carolina. Later in January 2016, Kangaroo Express stores were converted to Circle K stores.

== Products and services ==
The Pantry offered its own private label "Kangaroo" brand of gasoline, and operated 250 in-store quick-service restaurants. Additionally, 285 stores sold Marathon gasoline under a co-branding agreement.

The Kangaroo Express chain offered "Bean Street Coffee Company", its own brand of coffee, and its own private label for selected merchandise, and Roo's Water its own label for bottled water. Company promotions included "Freeze the Swamp" in Florida, "The Battle for Bean Street" in North Carolina's Triangle Area stores, Salute Our Troops, and Roo Cup.

In 2010, its "Fresh Initiative" was announced to improve the Bean Street Coffee Service, revamp nearly all Kangaroo Express stores, and add more appealing meals and snacks. The program was planned to encompass all stores by end of 2012.

More than half of Kangaroo Express stores were located within 25 miles of a military installation. The company has raised millions of dollars each year for military support organizations as part of its summer-long Salute Our Troops fundraising campaign.

In 2014, the first military-themed Kangaroo Express store opened in Fayetteville, North Carolina. Kangaroo Express hosted a round table at the USO of North Carolina Fort Bragg Center to collect input from servicemen and women, their spouses and children, and the store design was developed as a direct result of their feedback.

== Acquisitions ==
- 1997 – "Lil’ Champ", of Jacksonville, Florida, from Docks de France
- 1998 – "Quick Stop", of Fayetteville, North Carolina
- 1998 – "Zip Mart", primarily of North Carolina
- 1999 – "Etna", of Winston-Salem, North Carolina, from Taylor Oil
- 1999 – "Handy Way Stores", of Crescent City, Florida, from Miller
- 2000 – "Kangaroo", from Kangaroo Inc.
- 2000 – "On-the-Way Foods", from McKnight Oil
- 2003 – "Golden Gallon", of Chattanooga, Tennessee, from Ahold USA
- 2005 – "Cowboys" of Rome, Georgia from D & D Oil Co.
- 2007 – "Petro Express", of Charlotte, North Carolina
- 2011 – "Presto", of Olathe, Kansas

== Awards and acknowledgements ==
- Fortune 500 - since 2007
- Convenience Store News 2012 Grand Spirit Award
- Convenience Store News 2011 Spirit Award for companies with 500-plus stores
- Convenience Store News 2014 Best Original Store Design
- Convenience Store News 2014 Gold Medal Award Best Food Service/ LTO Promo
