= More (store) =

Indian grocery chain - MORE Supermarkets

More Retail Private Limited More. stores

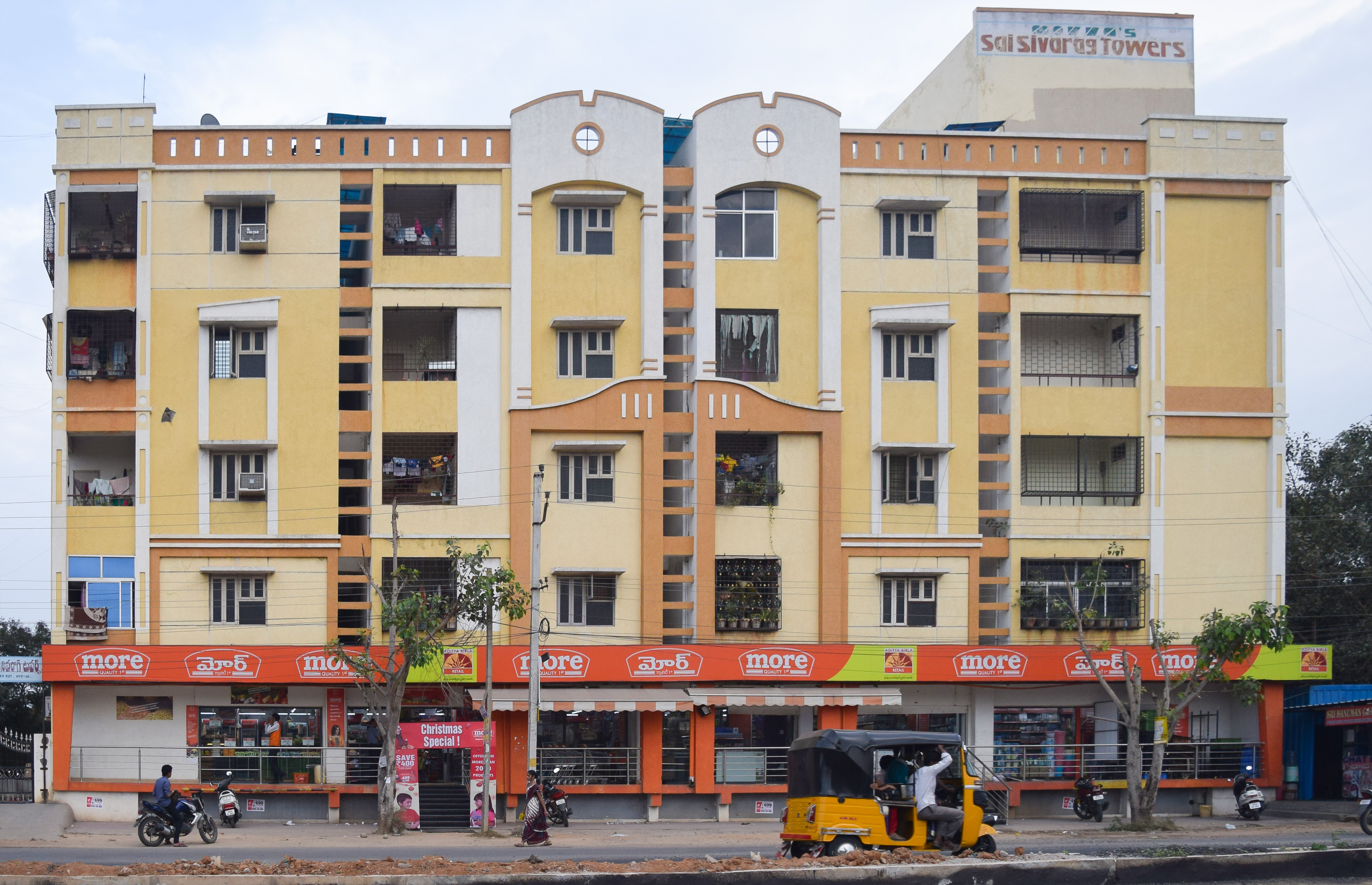
- A More supermarket in Hyderabad.
- Type: Private Company
- Industry: Retail
- Predecessor: Aditya Birla Retail Limited founded July 14, 1988; 37 years ago
- Founded: 2007
- Headquarters: Mumbai, India
- Number of locations: 878 - SuperMarkets, 42 - HyperMarkets
- Key people: Vinod Nambiar – Managing Director; Giridhar Ayanur Seetharam (CEO)
- Products: Supermarket; Hypermarket; Grocery & staples; Daily essentials; Dairy & frozen; Home and furniture; Home appliances; Bed & bath
- Brands: More Supermarket, More Hypermart, More Megastore
- Number of employees: over 11,000
- Website: moreretail.in

MORE (Short for "More Retail Private Limited") is an Indian food and grocery retail store chain. More operates its stores under two formats; More Supermarkets and More Hypermarkets. More also offers an online grocery service via its mobile app. More Retail was previously known as Aditya Birla Retail Limited when it was part of the Aditya Birla Group before More was sold to investors led by Samara Capital and Amazon. More Retail has a network of 878 Supermarkets in 30 cities and 42 Hypermarkets in 12 cities.

The company is headquartered in Mumbai and has offices in Kolkata and Bengaluru.

More Retail Limited also provide customers products under its own labels.

== History ==
1986 - K Anjaneyulu and his wife established Trinethra Super Retail, a Hyderabad-based supermarket chain.

2007 - Aditya Birla Group acquired Trinethra Super Retail, which was their first retail acquisition. Trinethra Super Retail had over 172 stores spread across four states - Andhra Pradesh, Karnataka, Tamil Nadu and Kerala. In Tamil Nadu and Andhra Pradesh, the Trinethra brand was being used, while in Karnataka and Kerala, the Fabmall brand was being used. ABG later rebranded Trinethra as More Retail.

2008 – More Retail launched More Hypermarket in Baroda and Mysore.

2008-12 – More Retail expanded its footprint to 635 stores across India

2015 - Aditya Birla Retail Limited acquired Total Super Stores from Jubilant Agri and Consumer Products Ltd (JACL)

2016-17 – Aditya Birla Retail Ltd won the Retail Transformation and Reinvention award for "Retail Transformation and Re-Invention"

2019 – WItzig Advisory acquired Aditya Birla Retail from Aditya Birla Retail Group and rebranded it as 'More Retail Pvt. Limited'

2022 – More Retail has 900+ stores across India.

== Restructuring ==
Various news reports, later confirmed by an order from Competition Commission of India, indicated the More was sold by Aditya Birla Group to a group of investors led by the private equity firm Samara Capital & E-Commerce company Amazon. Consequently, More is no longer part of Aditya Birla Group.
