= Mills Group Ltd =

Mills Group Ltd was a chain of 77 newsagents/convenience stores, located in suburbs and small towns throughout the Midlands, South Wales and the North East of England.

The company was founded in 1986 by accountant Nigel Mills and his father, John. Its head office, Mills House, was in West Monkseaton, near Newcastle upon Tyne where John Mills had owned a newsagent store.

The group attempted to diversify into a number of markets other than convenience, including insurance.

In December 2010, the company announced that the stores were being sold to the Tesco owned One Stop group. The sale was approved in March 2011. At this point, the group's annual revenue exceeded £100 million.

As well as convenience stores, the founders also owned three supermarkets and a hotel. After the sale of the group, Nigel Mills went on to found The Lakes Distillery.
