= Wesco (oil company) =

Wesco Inc.
- Type: Private
- Industry: Oil & Gas operations
- Founded: 1952; 74 years ago
- Headquarters: Muskegon, Michigan, U.S.
- Key people: Gerald (Jerry) Westgate (president); Lauren Wackernagel (CFO)
- Products: Petrochemical
- Number of employees: 1,050
- Website: www.gowesco.com

Wesco Inc. is a company that operates convenience stores throughout Michigan, mostly in West Michigan. It is based in North Muskegon, Michigan.

== History ==
Wesco was founded in 1952 by Bud Westgate. In the 1980s and 1990s, the company expanded by acquiring Rengo Oil (15 stores) and Weaver Oil (19 stores). Wesco now owns and operates a bulk fuel and propane business under the name Wesco Energy, along with six Subway locations and six Wesco Deli locations.

== Locations ==
Wesco operates 55 stores. Most of them are along the Lake Michigan shoreline between Holland and Benzonia, particularly in Holland, Grand Haven and Muskegon. A few are located as far east as Adrian. There are two, each across the road from each other, in Fruitport.

Some locations feature a deli that serves pizza and sandwiches. At some locations, they are also known for their popcorn.

== Wesco Bakery ==
Wesco has a bakery in Norton Shores, Michigan where they make "Fresh Every Day" Donuts, Muffins, Cookies, and more. Many Wesco locations also have in-store bakeries.

== Wesco Deli ==
Wesco operates 6 Wesco Deli locations in Grand Haven, White Cloud, Fremont, New Era, Whitehall, Belding, and Rothbury.

== Awards ==
Wesco was named one of West Michigan's 101 Best and Brightest Places to Work in 2010, 2011, 2012, and 2013. In 2016 Wesco was recognized as one of the 101 Best and Brightest Places to Work in the nation.

== Data Compromise ==
In late 2006, customers that used credit cards at WESCO Convenience Stores, as well as several other Michigan businesses, were subject to identity theft. This caused credit card companies to reissue thousands of new cards.
