= Foxtrot (convenience store) =

Convenience store chain based in Chicago

- Founded: 2015; 11 years ago in Chicago, United States
- Defunct: April 23, 2024
- Fate: Bankruptcy and liquidation
- Headquarters: Chicago, Illinois, U.S.
- Area served: Austin; Chicago; Dallas; Washington D.C.
- Key people: Liz Williams (CEO); Mike LaVitola (Co-founder and chairman); Tae Strain (Corporate executive chef)
- Number of employees: 1,000 (2024)
- Parent: Outfox Hospitality
- Website: foxtrotco.com

Foxtrot was a chain of convenience stores founded in Chicago in 2015 that also served as cafés, wine bars, and third places. It featured locally sourced products as well as wines and a selection of groceries. They were present in the Washington, D.C. metropolitan area, Dallas, Austin, and Chicago.

In November 2023, the company announced it was going to be merged with Dom's Kitchen & Market, an upscale grocery store brand with 2 stores, to be named Outfox Hospitality.

In January 2024, they opened their 10th location in Washington, D.C., their 33rd store in total. Placer.ai rated it together with Trader Joe's as one of its 2024 "hot brands", saying that it was "redefining the convenience store" and noting that it was attractive to its "wine drinker" and "nutritionally aware" categories of customers.

Foxtrot closed all of its locations suddenly on April 23, 2024. The company announced plans to file for bankruptcy protection. A day after the closure, Foxtrot's parent company, Outfox Hospitality, became the subject of a class action lawsuit filed in Chicago by a former Foxtrot employee and store manager over violating Illinois state and federal labor laws in regards to the abrupt shutdown.

On May 15, 2024, Foxtrot and Dom's Kitchen filed for Chapter 7 bankruptcy liquidation.
