= Potato wedges =

Slices of a potato, baked or fried

Potato Wedges
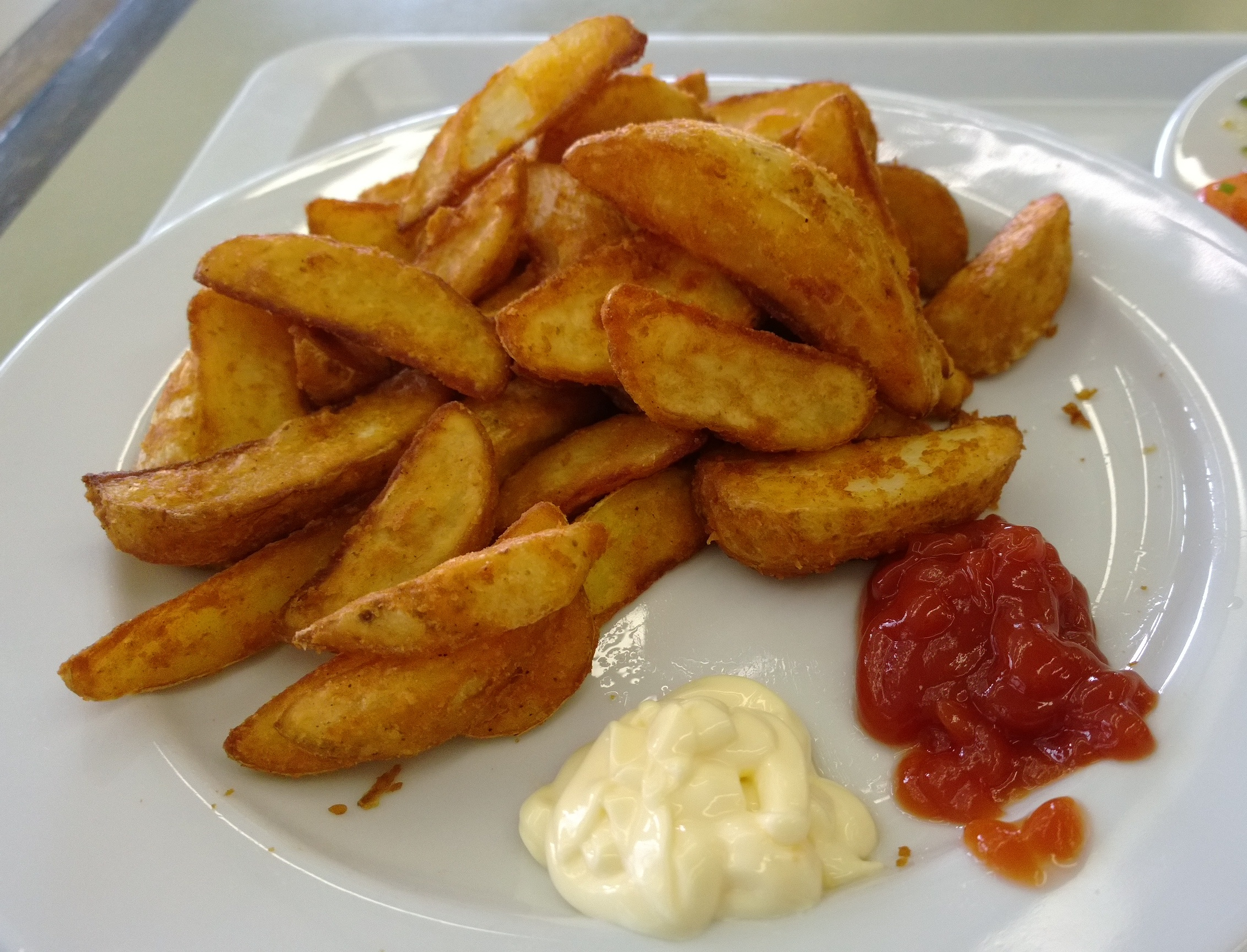
- Potato Wedges served with mayonnaise and ketchup
- Course: Hors d'oeuvre, side dish
- Main ingredients: Potatoes

Potato wedges are irregular wedge-shaped slices of potato, often large and unpeeled, that are either baked or fried. They are sold at diners and fast food restaurants, and are usually seasoned with a variety of spices, commonly paprika, salt and pepper.

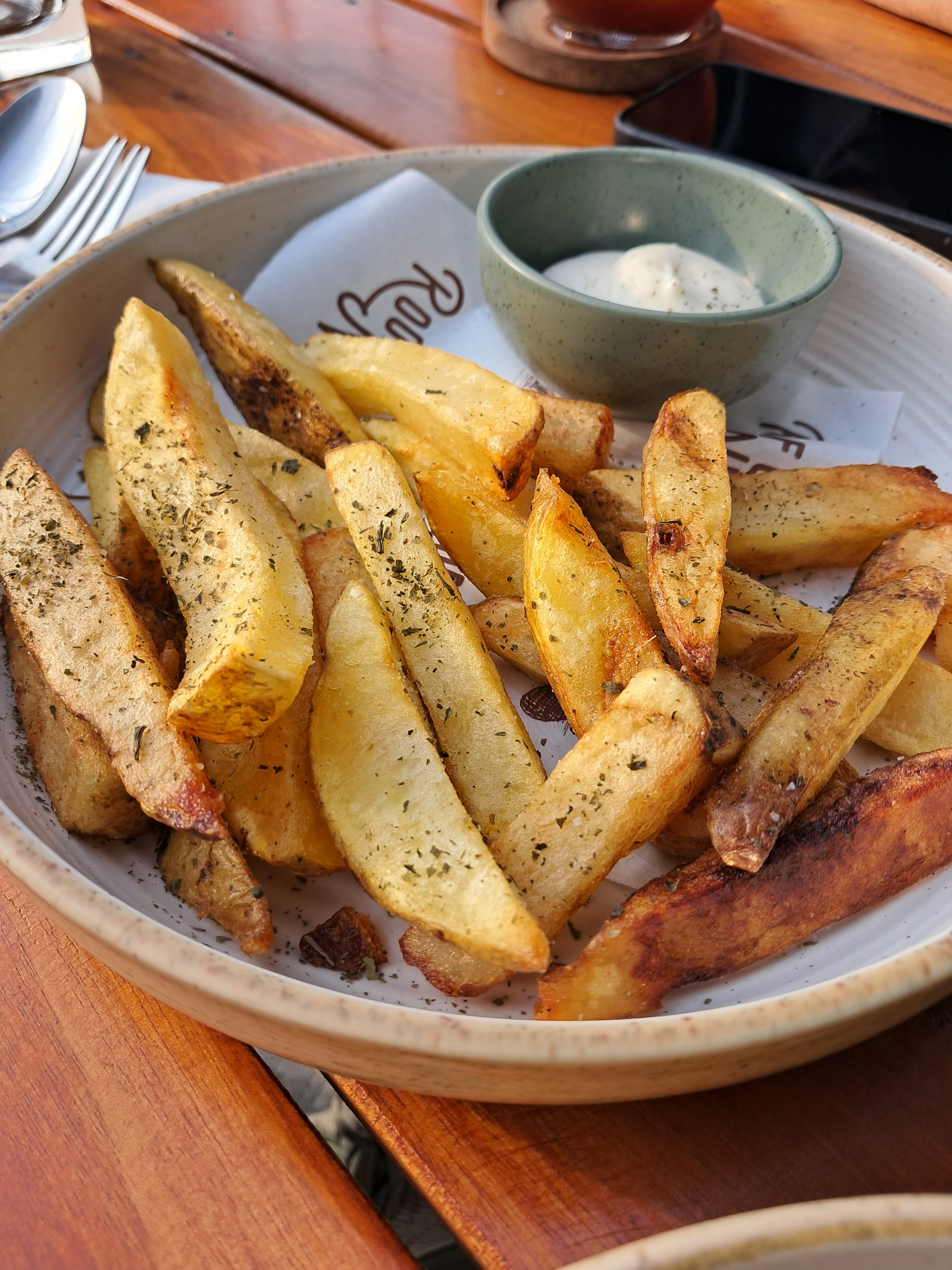
Potato wedges served with mayonnaise, at a restaurant in Jakarta, Indonesia

In Australia, potato wedges are a common bar food that are often served with a sauce. Consumers may use sour cream, sweet chili sauce, ketchup, or some combination of these. In Ireland, spicy potato wedges are a common item served at hot deli counters.

== Other names ==
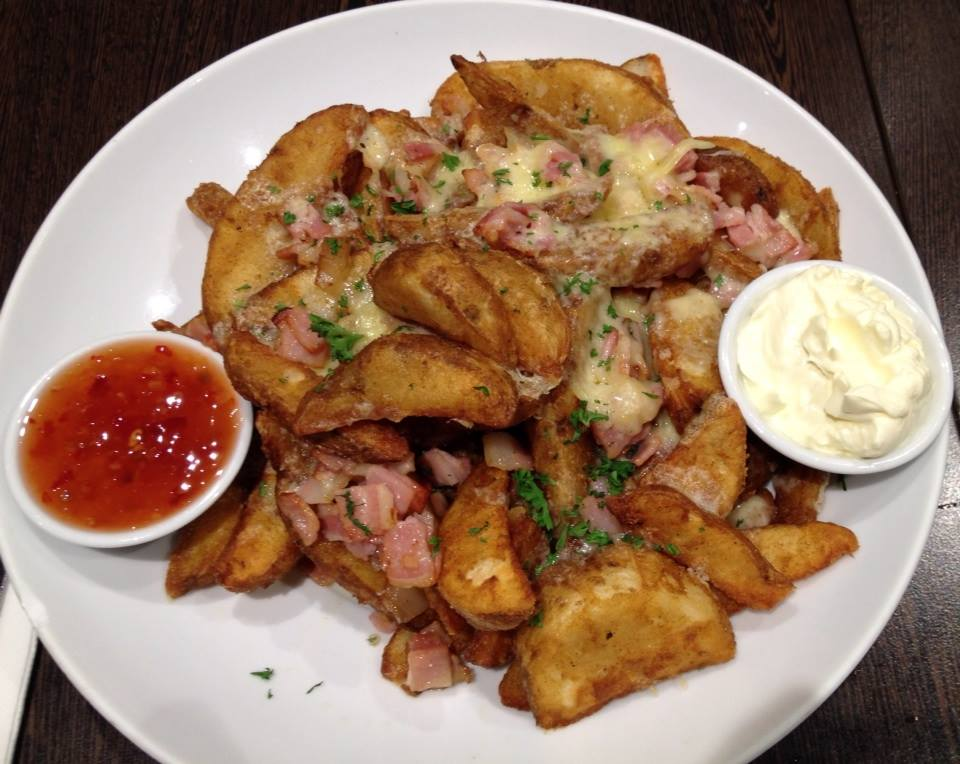
Potato wedges with cheese and bacon, accompanied by sweet chilli sauce and sour cream

- In some regions of the United States, particularly Idaho, Oregon, Washington, Montana, Alaska, Minnesota, Nebraska, Northern Utah, and Northeast Ohio, a popular variation of potato wedges are known as jojos. Jojos are potato wedges that are battered, seasoned, and either deep-fried in the same vat as fried chicken, or pressure-fried.
- In other regions of the United States, particularly Mississippi, Louisiana, Alabama, Georgia, Tennessee, and Arkansas, they are sometimes called potato logs.
- In Germany, they are known as Kartoffelspalten ('potato clefts'), wilde Kartoffeln ('wild potatoes'), Westernkartoffeln ('Western potatoes') or Kartoffelecken ('potato wedges').
- In Czechia, they are known as americké brambory ('American potatoes').
- In Slovakia, they are known as americké zemiaky ('American potatoes').
- In Russia, they are known as картофель по-деревенски kartofel po-derevenski ('village-style potatoes').
- In Georgia, they are known as მექსიკური კარტოფელი ('Mexican potatoes').

== See also ==
- List of hors d'oeuvre
- French fries
