= 108 Shop =

Thai convenience stores franchise

108 Shop Mini Outlet
- Industry: Retail (Convenience stores)
- Founded: 2004; 22 years ago
- Founders: Saha Group
- Headquarters: Bangkok, Thailand
- Number of locations: over 250
- Key people: Boonsithi Chokwatana; Boonyasit Chokwatana
- Parent: Saha Group; Sun 108 Co., Ltd
- Website: 108shops.com

108 Shop is a Thai chain of franchise convenience stores, with locations nationwide. Sun 108 is the operator of 108 Shop convenience stores and is a subsidiary of Saha Pathanapibul Co., Ltd (Saha Group).

In March 2013, Saha Group and Lawson, Inc. launched in Thailand, and they created “LAWSON 108” as a special store brand for Thailand. 108 Shop is undergoing a change of its name to LAWSON 108.
