= Fresh Mart =

Chain of convenience stores in Thailand

- Industry: Retail (Convenience stores)
- Founded: 2000
- Founders: Narin Jiyaron
- Headquarters: Bangkok, Thailand
- Number of locations: 600
- Parent: Fresh Mart International co., ltd
- Website: freshmart.co.th

Fresh Mart Unlimited (Thai: เฟรชมาร์ท) is a Thai chain of convenience stores which operates throughout the country as a part of Fresh Mart International Public Co.Ltd. It was founded in 2000 by Narin Jiyaron.

== Stores ==
As of 2011, the company operated 600 Fresh Marts.
