= Safeway (disambiguation) =

Safeway is an American supermarket chain.

Safeway may also refer to:

== Brands and enterprises ==
=== Supermarket chains ===
- Safeway (Australia), a defunct Australian supermarket chain, which was a subsidiary of the American company and is now part of Woolworths Limited
- Safeway (Canada), a former subsidiary of the American company and now a division of Sobeys
- Safeway (Channel Islands), a defunct Channel Islands supermarket chain, which was a subsidiary of the UK Safeway plc and is now part of Waitrose
- Safeway (UK), a defunct UK supermarket chain, which was a subsidiary of the American company
  - Safeway Stores (Ireland), a former Northern Ireland–based joint venture between Safeway plc and Fitzwilton Group

=== Other brands and enterprises ===
- Safeway Insurance Group, a privately held insurance company in the United States
- Safway Services, now known as BrandSafway, American construction services company

== People ==
- Safeway Goya, American singer
