= Thomas Warburton =

Thomas Warburton may refer to:

- Thomas Warburton (businessman) (1837–1909), English businessman
- Thomas Warburton (writer) (1918–2016), Finnish writer and translator
- Thomas Warburton better known as Mr. Warburton (born 1968), American animator and television producer
