= Rathbones Bakeries =

Bakery founded in 1893, in Lydney, Gloucestershire

Rathbones Bakeries was a bakery founded in 1893, in Wigan, Lancashire. By 1997 it was owned by Greencore, through that company's purchase of Kears Group Two years later, Kears Group rebranded itself as Rathbones.

Kears was bought from Greencore by Finedon Mill of Northampton, for £20.6 million in April 2004, a year in which it had sales of £100 million, with customers including Morrisons and Tesco. Following a fire the company went into receivership, with part of its operation sold to Warburtons and parts to Morrisons in 2005.
