= Rami Baitiéh =

French businessman of Lebanese ancestry

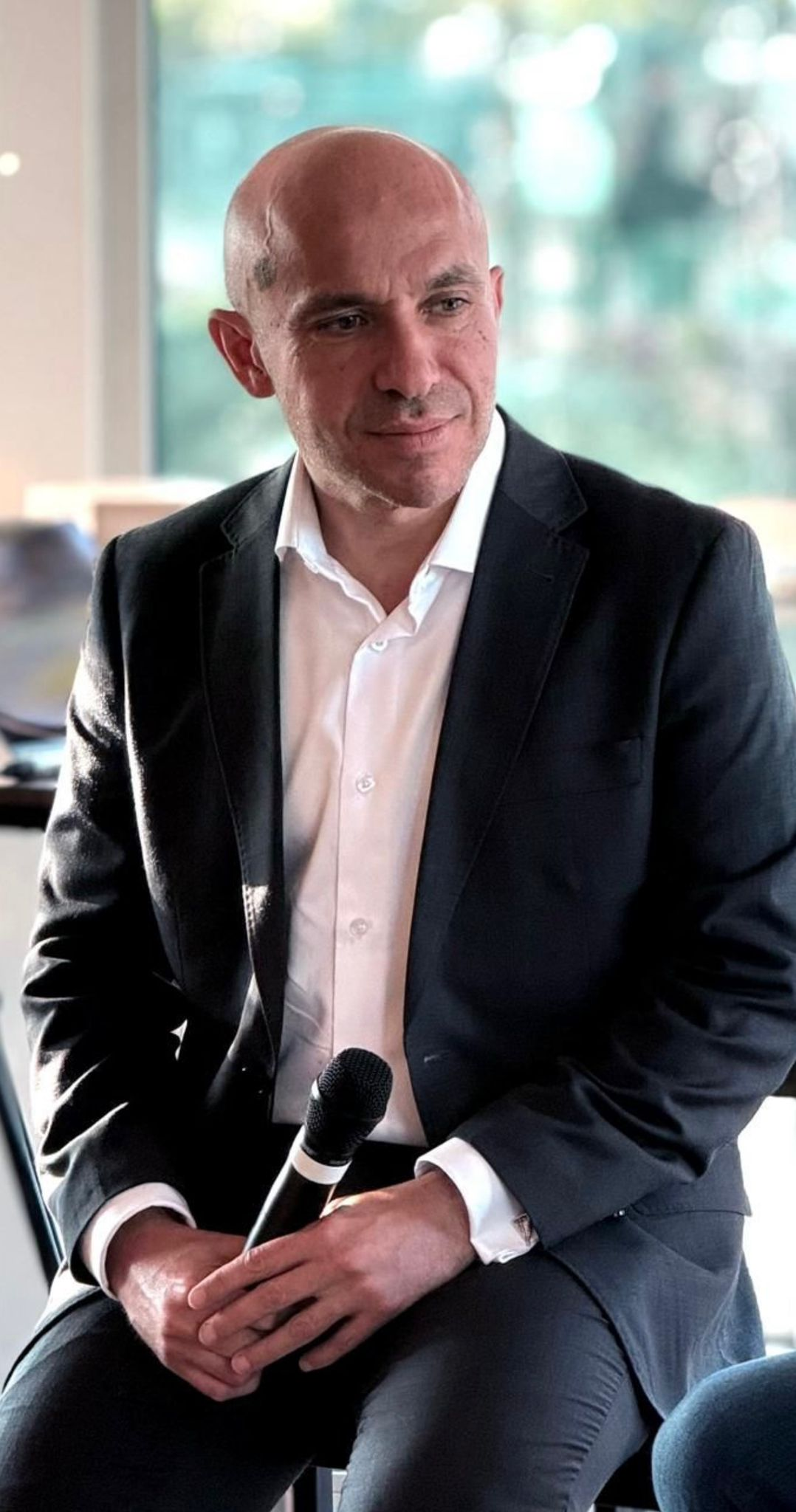
- Baitiéh in 2025
- Born: May 1971 (age 54–55)
- Education: Université du Québec
- Title: CEO, Morrisons
- Term: November 2023-
- Predecessor: David Potts

Rami Baitiéh is a French-Lebanese company director, currently Chief executive officer of Morrisons supermarkets. Born in Lebanon, he arrived in France at the age of 17 and began his career with Carrefour in 1995, joining the head office a few years later. Transferred to Poland in 2006, he joined Turkey after five years. He then successively managed Carrefour's subsidiaries in Taiwan, Argentina and Spain before taking over the management of Carrefour France in July 2020. He launched a plan to transform the company, with a focus on reducing its dependence to hypermarkets and increasing the share in revenues of convenience stores and organic food. In November 2023, he became managing director of retailer Morrisons in the UK.

== Biography ==
=== Early life and education ===
Born in Lebanon, Rami Baitiéh arrived in France at the age of seventeen and studied at the Compiègne business school. He graduated top of his class, with a master's degree in accounting and finance. He later joined the military reserve of the French Air and Space Force, in which he is now a colonel. In 2012, he obtained a Master of Business Administration from the University of Quebec in Montreal.

=== Career at Carrefour ===
Rami Baitiéh began his career in 1995 at Carrefour, as a department manager assistant in the Compiègne hypermarket. During this period, he developed a computer tool for supplies management to replace the paper-based schedule, which took several hours a day to fill. The tool was later deployed in other stores in the region and subsequently across the country. Following this, and after being noticed by Daniel Bernard, then chairman of the board of directors, he joined the head office as a buyer, and later became head of non-merchandise products.

In 2006, Rami Baitiéh moved to Poland, where he held the position of director of IT, supplies and strategy. Five years later, he was transferred to Turkey as merchandise and supply chain director. During this period, he introduced the 5/5/5 method, before taking up the same position in Romania, after two and a half years. This method consists in basing the company's organisation on fifteen points of customer relationship management and customer experience on which to concentrate efforts: five for trust, five for services and five for proximity. The aim is reached by offering strong promises and guarantees, such as immediate refunds with no time limit on non-food products.

In February 2015, Rami Baitiéh left Turkey to manage Carrefour Taiwanese subsidiary. His tenure there focused on food safety, a key issue in the local market. Spotted by Alexandre Bompard, then Carrefour's new CEO, Rami Baitiéh was sent to Argentina, and then in Spain, the group’s third-largest country in terms of sales, where he implemented similar management principles.

=== Executive director of Carrefour France ===
In July 2020, Rami Baitiéh became executive director France of Carrefour. He also joined the group's board of directors. In this role, he took charge of Carrefour's first and main subsidiary, which accounted at that time for 48% of the group's €80 billion in sales, with 105,000 employees and 5,424 shops, including 248 hypermarkets. He applied the same methods as in the previous countries, communicating his email address to all employees and on the Carrefour website. He imposed the relocation of the manager's office to the centre of each market and the sharing of his contact details with customers, or the presence of notebooks at checkouts to record all requests.

Rami Baitiéh launched the Top project, which involved replacing the multi-skilling of employees with specialisation in three teams: front, data and back. The aim was, once again, to reduce problems for customers, such as stock-outs. This led particularly to the abandonment of shopping trolleys with tokens, deemed as irritating by customers. On his arrival, Rami Baitiéh also set up the School for Leaders, an internal training programme open to all employees, to give them the opportunity to progress up the hierarchy. He had previously set up this process in Argentina and then in Spain, after a cashier complained that it was administratively cumbersome to progress internally.. He also made it his duty to visit the Group's supplier factories twice a month.

Concerning commercial development, Rami Baitiéh's term at the head of Carrefour France was mainly devoted to the transition from a model focused on the hypermarket, which appeal among the public was waning but which he had nevertheless to straighten up, to a model focused on e-commerce and small business. He also aimed to expand the organic products and private label offers. To this end, he initiated the takeover of Bio c'bon, an organic farming retailer, after it filed for bankruptcy in 2020. He also developed franchises and lease management, with the recovery of Carrefour's market share as a result. Lease management was thus the preferred model for the development of Supeco, a discount chain launched in September, prior to the arrival of Rami Baitiéh at the head of Carrefour France. He also opened up Carrefour France to new outlets to diversify revenues, such as car rental.

=== CEO of Morrisons ===
Rami Baitiéh succeeded David Potts as Chief Executive Officer of Morrisons on 6 November 2023. Morrisons was then the fifth largest retailer in the United Kingdom. This brought to an end his twenty-eight-year association with Carrefour, during which time he will have worked in seven countries and learnt eight languages. In 2023, Morrisons operated five hundred supermarkets and hypermarkets and a network of one thousand convenience stores, with around 110,000 employees and €18.4 billion in sales. The company's business model is based on strong private labels development, with extensive vertical integration.

Rami Baitiéh's appointment followed the takeover of Morrisons two years earlier by American private equity firm Clayton, Dubilier & Rice for seven billion pounds and the company's acquisition in May 2022 of McColl's, a chain of 1,200 convenience stores. One of his first tasks was to finalise this takeover and the transition of all McColl's shops under the Morrisons Daily brand.

In September 2024, Rami Baitiéh joined Marjane Holding, a Moroccan mass retail group, as an independent director. In January 2025, he was appointed chairman of GroceryAid, a charity that provides financial, emotional and practical support to people who work or have worked in the food retail sector in the United Kingdom.

Business positions
Preceded by David Potts	Chief executive officer of Morrisons; 2023–present	Incumbent
