= Great Academy Ashton =

Location
- Broadoak Road; Ashton-Under-Lyne, Greater Manchester, OL6 8RF; England; 53.5047°N 2.0833°W

Information
- Type: Academy
- Motto: “Inspiring Greatness ”
- Department for Education URN: 135508 Tables
- Ofsted: Reports
- Head teacher: David Waugh
- Gender: Coeducational
- Age: 11 to 16
- Colours: Red, white and black
- Website: gaa.greatacademies.co.uk

Great Academy Ashton (formerly New Charter Academy) is a coeducational secondary school with academy status in Ashton-under-Lyne, Greater Manchester, England.

The school was formed on 1 September 2008 as a result of a merger between Hartshead Sports College and Stamford High School. New Charter Academy was originally split between the two former school sites, but moved to a new £40 million sole campus in September 2011, shared with Samuel Laycock School.

Great Academy Ashton is part of the Great Academies Education Trust which also includes Copley Academy and Silver Springs Primary Academy in Stalybridge, as well as Middleton Technology School.

Great Academy Ashton is sometimes informally known as GAA and used to be called New Charter Academy up until September 2017.

The school was placed in special measures in January 2017. The current headteacher, David Waugh, has been working at the school since January 2021.

== Notable former pupils ==
=== Hartshead County Secondary School ===
- David Potts, CEO, Morrisons
