= Tameside College =

Coordinates: 53.4877°N 2.0804°W

Location
- Beaufort Rd; Ashton Under Lyne, Greater Manchester, OL6 6NX; England

Information
- Local authority: Tameside
- Specialist: College
- Ofsted: Reports
- Chair: John Lyne
- Principal: Ms Jackie Moores
- Gender: Coeducational
- Age: 16 to None

Tameside College is a further education college located in Ashton-under-Lyne, Greater Manchester, England.

The college offers a range of courses for students from Tameside and the surrounding area. These courses include NVQs, BTECs, Apprenticeships, Access courses the college also runs adult learning in the evenings. As well as its operations from its main site in Ashton-under-Lyne, the college also operates three Local Learning Centres in Ashton-under-Lyne, Droylsden and Hyde.

Tameside College opened a brand new campus at Tameside One in Ashton Town Centre in 2018 as part of the rengeration work within the town Vision Tameside. The new campus includes improved facilities and a larger space to accommodate future students. Subject areas include, Hair and Beauty, Hospitality and Catering, IT, Travel and Tourism. The centre also includes the training restaurant "The Restaurant@T-One" and a training hair and beauty salon, both of which are open to the public.

Tameside College also owns and operates Clarendon Sixth Form College also in Ashton-under-Lyne, offering A-Levels to local school-leavers. The College Principal is Jackie Moores.

== Notable former pupils ==
- Mick Hucknall, singer-songwriter, former frontman of Simply Red
- David Potts - CEO, Morrisons
