= David Potts (businessman) =

British corporate executive

- Born: David Tom Potts; 18 March 1957 (age 69); Ashton-under-Lyne, England
- Education: Hartshead County Secondary School; Tameside College
- Alma mater: Hollings College (now Manchester Metropolitan University)
- Known for: Former CEO of Morrisons (2015-2023)
- Children: 2 sons

David Tom Potts, CBE (born 18 March 1957) is a British corporate executive who has been chief executive of Asda since November 2026. He was chief executive of Morrisons from 2015 to 2023.

== Early life ==
David Tom Potts was born on 18 March 1957 in Ashton-under-Lyne, and educated there at Hartshead County Secondary School.

Potts got a summer job at Tesco in Ashton-under-Lyne as a general assistant, while waiting for his O-level results, having already worked in a greengrocers. He failed all five of his O-levels, and has stated, "My lack of success at school was probably to do with playing football all the time".

== Career ==
Having failed his exams, Potts continued working full-time with Tesco. After work, he studied at Tameside College to obtain English and Maths O-levels. Then he studied on day release for a diploma in retailing at Hollings College (now part of Manchester Metropolitan University) in Manchester.

Aged 24, he was posted to Ryde on the Isle of Wight, as Tesco's youngest-ever superstore manager.

In February 2015, it was announced that Potts would succeed Dalton Philips as CEO of Morrisons, who would step down after five years in charge.

It was announced in September 2023 that Potts would be standing down as CEO of Morrisons in November 2023.

On 3 November 2026, Potts became group chief executive of Asda, taking over from Allan Leighton, who stepped back to become non-executive chairman.

== Honours ==
In the 2013 New Year Honours, Potts was appointed a Commander of the Order of the British Empire (CBE) "for services to Employment, Skills and Apprenticeships in the Retail Sector".

== Personal life ==
He has two sons, Dan and George. and two grandchildren Esmé and Leo, the children of Dan and his wife Sarah. His partner is Jane Holt.

Business positions
Preceded by Dalton Philips	Chief executive officer of Morrisons; 2015–2023	Succeeded by Rami Baitiéh
