= Motor Fuel Group =

Petrol retailer in the United Kingdom

Motor Fuel Limited
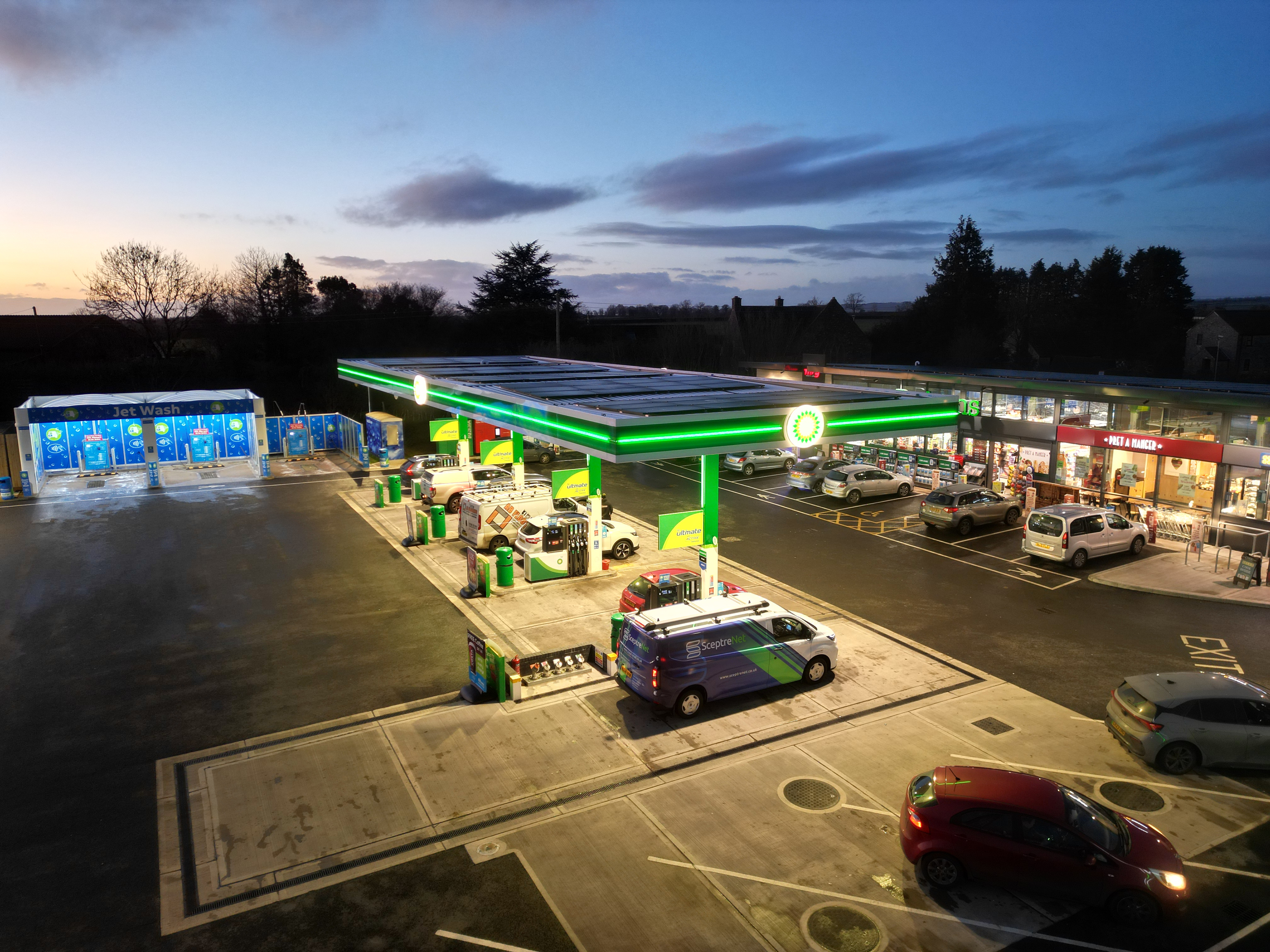
- MFG petrol station logo
- Type: Private
- Founded: 2004
- Headquarters: St Albans,
- Owner: Clayton, Dubilier and Rice
- Parent: Morrisons (20%)
- Website: motorfuelgroup.com

Motor Fuel Group (trading as Motor Fuel Group and MFG) is a British forecourt operator that has grown through a series of management-led acquisitions and strategic investments to become one of the United Kingdom’s largest independent petrol station operators.

As of March 2024, the group is the UK's largest independent forecourt provider. The company is currently based in St Albans and is owned by Clayton, Dubilier & Rice, who also own the Morrisons supermarket chain.

== History ==
Motor Fuel Group (MFG) is a British forecourt operator that has grown through a series of management-led acquisitions and strategic investments to become one of the United Kingdom’s largest independent petrol station operators.

The modern incarnation of the company traces its origins to late 2011, when a new management team led by Chief Executive Officer William Bannister acquired the business on 22 December 2011. The team included Jeremy Clarke (Chief Operating Officer), Simon Lane (Chief Financial Officer) and Adam Wadlow (Chief Investment Officer), each bringing significant experience from the forecourt and convenience retail sectors. The group at this time operated a network of approximately 48 sites under major fuel brands including BP, Shell, Esso, Mobil Texaco and Jet, with a strategy focused on expansion and retail diversification.

MFG’s growth accelerated through acquisitions throughout the 2010s. In October 2014, the company completed the purchase of the retail assets of Murco Petroleum, adding hundreds of sites and substantially increasing its market presence. In 2015, the business secured new investment from American private equity firm Clayton, Dubilier & Rice (CD&R) in a transaction valued at around £500 million, further bolstering its capacity for expansion. That year also saw the acquisition of 90 Shell-branded stations.

Between 2016 and 2017, MFG continued to add forecourts through several smaller acquisitions, including Synergie Holdings, Roadside Group, FW Kerridge, Burns & Co., Manor Service Stations and sites from the Golden Cross Group.

A major milestone came in 2018 when MFG announced the £1.2 billion acquisition of MRH, one of the UK’s largest independent forecourt operators, bringing nearly 500 additional sites into its network and making it one of the country’s biggest operators by site count. The deal also included fuel wholesale and retail operations in the Channel Islands under brands such as Roberts, PDJ and GPD.

The expansion continued with additional purchases in subsequent years, including 10 operating stations and three new-to-industry sites from Symonds Retail Limited in 2019, and six forecourts in the Lake District acquired in December 2020. In early 2021, MFG added several operational and new-to-industry sites from BP, and announced a planned £400 million investment to deploy ultra-rapid electric vehicle (EV) charging infrastructure across hundreds of its sites as part of a long-term diversification strategy.

Throughout 2022, despite challenging market conditions, the group reported strong trading performance and continued development of its retail and EV charging offerings, including the rollout of its EV Power network and expanded food-to-go partnerships.

In April 2024, MFG completed a major £2.5 billion acquisition of 337 Morrisons petrol forecourts, together with over 400 associated sites across the UK, further expanding its retail footprint and opportunities for ultra-rapid EV charger deployment.

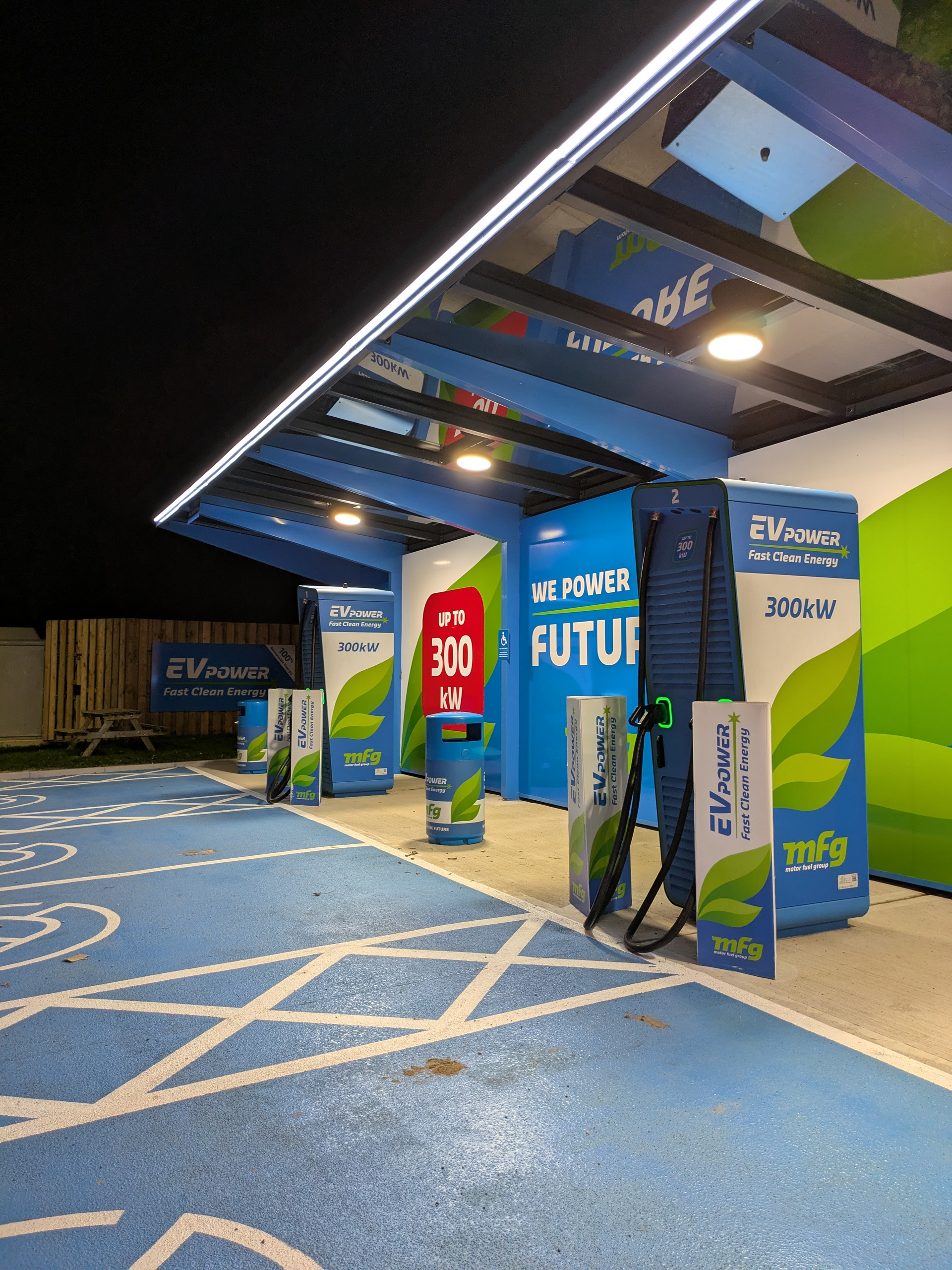
EV Power rapid charger in Tonbridge, Kent

As of 2025, MFG operates more than 1,200 sites across the United Kingdom, combining traditional forecourt fuel retailing with convenience retail, food service and a growing electric vehicle charging network.

== Time Line ==
Year	Event
2014	In October, MFG completed the acquisition of the retail assets of Murco Petroleum.
2015	In April, 90 Shell-branded stations were acquired. In July, MFG secured new investors Clayton, Dubilier & Rice (CD&R) in a transaction valued at approximately £500 million.
2016	MFG acquired north-west based Synergie Holdings with 19 stations and north-east based Roadside Group with 10 stations.
2017	Four stations each were acquired from FW Kerridge and Burns & Co., nine stations from Macclesfield-based Manor Service Stations, and 14 stations from the Golden Cross Group.
2018	In February, MFG announced the £1.2 billion acquisition of MRH, bringing nearly 500 stations into the network. The acquisition also included a wholesale and retail fuel business in the Channel Islands, operating under the Roberts, PDJ, and GPD brands.
2019	In October, 10 operating stations and three new-to-industry (NTI) sites were acquired from south-west England forecourt operator Symonds Retail Limited.
2020	In December, MFG acquired six forecourts in the Lake District from AUK Investments Limited.
2021	In January, seven operational stations and nine NTI sites were purchased from BP. In March, a £400 million investment plan was announced for 2,800 Ultra-Rapid 150kW EV chargers across 500 MFG sites over 10 years. In Q2, six high-volume BP-branded sites in the South East were acquired from George Hammond.
2022	Despite unprecedented challenges, 2022 was MFG’s best trading year since its formation in 2011. The year saw the opening of three NTI sites, 35 major developments, and construction of 43 EV Power hubs. ‘Food to Go’ offerings expanded with eight new PRETs, 21 new Greggs, and the first Burger King.
2024	At the end of April, MFG completed a £2.5 billion acquisition of 337 Morrisons petrol forecourts and more than 400 associated sites across the UK, supporting Ultra-Rapid EV charging development.

== See also ==
- EG Group
- Park Garage Group
- Rontec
