= Clarendon Sixth Form College =

Sixth-form college in Greater Manchester, England

Location
- Camp Street; Ashton-under-Lyne, Greater Manchester, OL6 6DF; England; 53.4906°N 2.0930°W

Information
- Type: Sixth form college
- Established: 1980s
- Local authority: Tameside
- Department for Education URN: 130516 Tables
- Ofsted: Reports
- Principal: Jackie Moores
- Gender: Coeducation
- Age: 16 to 18
- Website: https://www.clarendon.ac.uk

Clarendon Sixth Form College is a sixth-form college on Camp Street in Ashton-under-Lyne, England, in the metropolitan borough of Tameside.

In October 2015, the college relocated to a new building in Ashton town centre, from the previous site on Clarendon Road in Hyde.

== History ==
Originally Hyde County Grammar School for Boys, this educational establishment closed its doors to 11-year-olds in 1979. When the last intake had progressed to the Sixth Form, the Sixth Form college was formally established. It was during this period that the now highly acclaimed "Dominion" rock band was formed by students at the college. The Brand Name 'Hyde Clarendon' was added some years later and derives from the college's location on Clarendon Road.

Clarendon Sixth Form College delivers a mixture of A-Level and vocational qualifications.

It is now part of Tameside College, a larger further education college based on Beaufort Road in Ashton-under-Lyne.

== Alumni ==
=== Hyde County Grammar School for Boys ===
- Warren Bradley, footballer
- Air Vice-Marshal John Cliffe CB OBE, station commander of RAF Leeming from 1999 to 2000
- Prof Christopher Collier, professor of environmental remote sensing at the University of Salford since 1995, and President of the Royal Meteorological Society from 2004 to 2006
- Ronnie Hazlehurst, conductor and composer of many TV themes such as Yes Minister, and three times musical director of the Eurovision Song Contest (left at the age of 14)
- Brian Kent, president of the Institution of Mechanical Engineers from 1994 to 1995
- Timmy Mallett
- Prof Louis Wain CBE, professor of agricultural chemistry at Wye College from 1950 to 1978, and winner of the Mullard Award in 1988

=== Clarendon Sixth Form College ===
- Tom Cassell (better known as Syndicate or The Syndicate Project), popular gaming commentator on YouTube. He left the college to pursue his YouTube career and has since amassed over 12.5 million subscribers.
- Col Needham, English entrepreneur who is known as the founder and CEO of IMDb. He has been general manager of IMDb since its acquisition by Amazon in 1998.
