= Greencore =

Irish food company

Greencore Group plc
- Company type: Public
- Traded as: LSE: GNC; FTSE 250 component
- Founded: 1991; 35 years ago in Dublin, Ireland
- Headquarters: Dublin, Ireland
- Key people: Leslie Van de Walle (Chairman); Dalton Philips (CEO)
- Products: Convenience foods; Sandwiches; Deserts; Pizzas; Ready meals; Sauces; Soups; Dips; Salads
- Revenue: ▲£1,947 million (2025)
- Operating income: ▲£125.7 million (2025)
- Net income: ▲£79.5 million (2025)
- Number of employees: 28,000 (2026)
- Subsidiaries: Feldhues Group
- Website: www.greencore.com

Greencore Group plc is a food company in Ireland. It was established by the Irish government in 1991, when Irish Sugar was privatised, but today Greencore's products are mainly convenience foods, not only in Ireland but also in the United Kingdom. A major supplier to British and Irish supermarkets, Greencore is the largest sandwich manufacturer in the world. It is listed on the London Stock Exchange and is a constituent of the FTSE 250 Index.

== History ==
The company was established in 1926 in Carlow as a private enterprise known as the Irish Sugar Manufacturing Company, Limited. The Sugar Manufacture Act, 1933 was passed to promote self-sufficiency in sugar manufacture; this Act was brought on by a crisis in the industry and resulted in the nationalisation of sugar manufacture. Factories were built in Mallow, Thurles and Tuam, and the company became Cómhlucht Siúicre Éireann, Teoranta, the Irish for Irish Sugar Company, Limited. When run by Michael Joe Costello, Irish Sugar introduced the first electronic computer into Ireland in 1957, buying it from Dora Metcalf. The Thurles and Tuam factories were closed in the early 1980s after a rationalisation became necessary, and the company decided to concentrate manufacture at its Carlow and Mallow factories.

In February 1990, the then managing director, Chris Comerford, was found to have received £9 million when the company acquired the 49% shareholding in a subsidiary that it did not already own. Comerford resigned but four years of litigation between the company and Comerford followed.

The Sugar Act, 1991 privatised the entity and it became Greencore at that time. The Act was passed as the company had diversified beyond being a sugar-manufacturing company into other food products. That year 55% of the group was listed on the Irish Stock Exchange, and over the years since additional placements have led to almost 100% of the shares being in private hands. However, the Irish Government retains a special share, with a face value of EUR 1.26, in order to prevent the Irish sugar quota being sold without its consent.

In 2005 the company announced that it would close its factory in Carlow, ceasing production on 11 March. In March 2006 it was announced that the last remaining factory would close in Mallow, and this closure occurred on 12 May. The reason indicated for these closures has been the reform of European Union policies on sugar which reduced the quotas and subsidies available and therefore making its manufacture unprofitable in Ireland. The company took a charge of €9M to its profit in 2008 when it was alleged that the former financial controller of the Mineral Water business had concealed costs.

In October 2009 Nordzucker announced that it had bought Greencore's 50% stake in its joint venture SugarPartners. As part of the deal, Nordzucker acquired the Siucra, McKinney and Castle brands from the company. On 10 November 2010, the European Court of Auditors found that the closure of the last Greencore sugar plant in Mallow in 2006 may not have been necessary.

The company was due to merge with Northern Foods in 2011 to form Essenta Foods, to be headquartered in Dublin but listed on the London Stock Exchange. The deal, however, fell through after businessman Ranjit Singh Boparan outbid Greencore to win the approval of Northern Foods shareholders, on 21 January 2011. On 12 July 2011, Greencore announced it intended to buy Uniq plc. The deal closed in November 2011, with Uniq resultantly delisting from the London Stock Exchange. On 25 July 2016, the company acquired The Sandwich Factory Holdings Ltd for £15m from Cranswick plc. On 14 November 2016, Greencore announced it would acquire US-based Peacock Foods for $747.5m, significantly expanding its presence in the country.

The health of Greencore's U.S. business was questioned by investors as a result of a late August 2017 fear that Starbucks had backtracked on a contract at the coffee giant's Jacksonville facility in Florida. Brokerage house Cantor Fitzgerald became the first firm to lower its investment rating of Greencore, stating that the stock's fall was caused by "some underlying event in the US."

In October 2018 Greencore announced that it would sell its U.S. business to Hearthside Food Solutions for £817 million.

In June 2021 Patrick Murray, a manager at Greencore in Dundee, Scotland, was found to have racially abused an English employee and the company was fined £13,000.

In September 2022, Dalton Philips became CEO of Greencore.

In June 2024, Greencore voluntarily and proactively recalled 45 of its products following an outbreak of Shigatoxigenic E. coli in the United Kingdom in major supermarket chains. Although no testing of their products has yet indicated the presence of E. coli in them, Greencore wanted to take precautionary steps to minimize harm to consumers and spread information about the outbreak.

In April 2025, the company announced the acquisition of Bakkavör for £1.2 billion with the deal being subject to shareholder and regulatory approval. In December 2025, it was announced that Greencore had received final clearance from the UK Competition and Markets Authority to proceed with the acquisition of Bakkavor, subject to the divestment of its Bristol soups and sauces facility. The approval enabled Greencore to complete the transaction, scheduled for January 2026, following regulatory concerns regarding competition in the own-label chilled sauces market. In January 2026, it was announced the Nottingham-headquartered chilled food manufacturer, The Compleat Food Group had completed the acquisition of Greencore’s sauces and soups business in Bristol following approval from the Competition and Markets Authority. The acquisition of Bakkavör was completed on 16 January 2026.

== See also ==
- List of Irish companies
- Foo Go
