= Rontec =

Rontec Roadside Retail Limited
- Company type: Private
- Industry: Retail
- Founded: 2011
- Founder: Gerald Ronson
- Headquarters: London, United Kingdom
- Website: https://rontec.com

Rontec Roadside Retail Limited is a British operator of filling stations, convenience stores and food service providers in the United Kingdom, with around 260 sites.

== History ==
In 2011, British businessman Gerald Ronson purchased a number of Total sites, forming Rontec.

In 2015, the operator launched Shop'n Drive, supplied by Booker Group. In November 2016, the operator launched an agreement with Morrisons to launch Morrisons Daily stores at its forecourts.

== See also ==
- EG Group
- Motor Fuel Group
- Park Garage Group

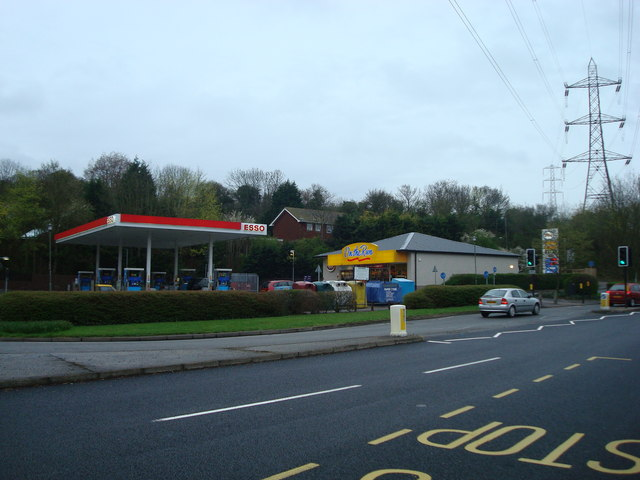
A Rontec site on the A21 in London.
