= Col Needham =

English entrepreneur (born 1967)

- Needham in 2026
- Born: Colin Needham; 26 January 1967 (age 59); Denton, Lancashire, England
- Education: University of Leeds (BS)
- Occupation: Computer scientist
- Spouse: Karen Gaskin (m. 1989)
- Children: 2

Colin Needham (born 26 January 1967) is an English computer scientist who founded the Internet Movie Database (IMDb). He was its chief executive officer from its creation in 1990 until 2025, when he stepped down and instead took a role as its executive chairman.

== Early life ==
Needham was born on 26 January 1967 in Denton, Lancashire. (Note: Denton was in Lancashire until it was moved to the newly formed Greater Manchester in 1974.) He attended Audenshaw School and Clarendon Sixth Form College in Hyde, Cheshire, (Note: Hyde was in Cheshire until it was moved to the newly formed Greater Manchester in 1974.) and graduated from the University of Leeds with a BSc (Hons) in computer science in 1988.

== Career ==
Needham started the Internet Movie Database (IMDb) in 1990 while working as an engineer at Hewlett-Packard (HP) in Bristol. The site evolved from what was initially his personal film database, which became an online bulletin board consisting of simple records kept on a succession of early computers and contributed to by several people, all of whom Needham outlasted.

By 1996, with the success of IMDb's first film-related advertising campaign (for Independence Day), Needham had quit HP to work on IMDb fully as a paid employee. In 1998, IMDb was acquired by Amazon. In 1999, Needham won two Webby Awards for IMDb.

In 2017, Needham removed message boards from IMDb, stating that they "are no longer providing a positive, useful experience for the vast majority of our more than 250 million monthly users worldwide". In 2025, he stepped down as the chief executive officer of IMDb and handed over to Nikki Santoro, then shifted to the role of executive chairman.

== Personal life ==
Needham married Karen Gaskin in 1989. They live in Filton with their twin daughters.
