= Dalton Philips =

Irish businessman (born 1968)

- Born: Timothy David Dalton Philips; 18 February 1968 (age 58)
- Education: Stowe School
- Alma mater: University College Dublin; Harvard University
- Occupation: Businessman
- Years active: 1989–present
- Title: Chief Executive of Greencore
- Term: 26 September 2022-present
- Children: 3

Timothy David Dalton Philips (born 18 February 1968) is an Irish businessman. He has been the CEO of Greencore since September 2022.

He was the CEO of the UK supermarket chain Morrisons from January 2010 until March 2015, when he was succeeded by David Potts. He was the chief executive of DAA, the Irish state-owned global airports and travel retail group which runs Dublin and Cork airports until September 2022.

== Early life ==
Born in Ireland, Philips is the son of the late Tim Philips, who was managing director of Ballyfree Farms, and the grandson of Osbourne David Philips, an American entrepreneur who invented the plastic zip-lock. Philip's mother Susan was an independent member of Wicklow County Council and a politics tutor at University College Dublin.

Philips attended Stowe School in Buckinghamshire, has a BA in geography/Greek & Roman civilisation (1990) from University College Dublin, an MBA from Harvard Business School and an honorary doctorate of management from the University of Bradford.

== Career ==
His retailing career began in New Zealand, where he began as a store manager. He then had 11 jobs in 14 countries, including an appointment to Jardine Matheson's Dairy Farm International. He joined Walmart in 1998, and after working in Brazil, became chief operating officer in Germany. He then joined the Weston family retail operation as CEO of upmarket Irish department store group Brown Thomas in 2007, and then becoming chief operating officer of Canadian retailer Loblaw in January 2007, under Allan Leighton.

After Morrisons CEO Marc Bolland announced his departure to Marks and Spencer in December 2009, Philips was appointed as his replacement in January 2010.

At Morrisons annual general meeting in June 2014, Morrisons former chairman Sir Ken Morrison blasted Phillips and his new board of directors for their running of the company, stating, "I have something like 1000 bullocks and, having listened to your presentation, Dalton, you’ve got a lot more bullshit than me".

In January 2015, Philips was ousted as chief executive of Wm Morrison after several years of poor profitability and a series of strategy changes.

Philips was CEO of DAA from 2017 to 2022. In 2019, the DAA saw record-breaking passenger numbers. In 2020, Covid was “the most serious crisis that has ever faced the international aviation sector and our business,” according to Philips. By June 2020, the pandemic had already cost DAA €160m in lost revenue, with passengers decreased by 99%. The DAA implemented a series of public health measures to protect and enhance the health and safety of passengers and staff as a result of COVID-19. In October 2020, Dublin Airport anti-COVID-19 measures received accreditation from global industry body Airports Council International (ACI).

On 1 June 2022, Philips was called before the Oireachtas transport committee as a representative of the DAA after multiple days of prolonged queues with more than 1,000 passengers missing a flight in one day. After DAA gave no guarantee that such queues would not return the situation was described by Minister of State in the Department of Finance, Seán Fleming as a "reflection of bad management, full stop".

In May 2021, Philips had defended as necessary the decision to lay off 2,000 of DAA's 7,750 staff, despite the state backstop in place at the time, stating, "if you had that [bailout] mentality, it’s all over...we have to carry our own water." The decision to fire so many staff was criticised in June 2022 in Dáil Éireann, with deputies claiming that the resultant airport delays had made Ireland in to a "laughing stock".

Philips became CEO and executive director of Greencore in September 2022.

== Other work ==
Philips was a member of the Irish government's high-level task force on COVID-19 vaccination rollout.

== Recognition ==
In December 2025, Philips was named Business Person of the Year at the Business & Finance Awards in recognition of his work at Greencore. In 2020, Philips was awarded UCD Alumnus of the Year in Arts & Humanities.

== Personal life ==
Philips has other business interests including a number of non-executive directorships, and is known to have a public Christian profile. Philips has three children and is married to Penny Nesbitt, a member of the family who previously owned Arnotts department store, and speaks Spanish, Italian and Portuguese.

Business positions
Preceded by Marc Bolland	Chief executive officer of Morrisons; 2009–2015	Succeeded by David Potts
