= Park Garage Group =

British petrol station operator

Park Garage Group PLC
- Company type: Private
- Industry: Retail
- Founded: 1975
- Founder: Mandan and Sneh Tandon
- Headquarters: Croydon, London, United Kingdom
- Website: https://parkgaragegroup.com

Park Garage Group is a family-owned British operator of filling stations in the United Kingdom, founded in 1975.

== History ==
In February 2023, the group purchased 27 forecourts from EG Group, who were forced to sell these because of a Competition and Markets Authority decision following the EG Group owners purchase of Asda, giving Park Garage Group 77 forecourt sites.

== See also ==
- EG Group
- Motor Fuel Group
- Rontec
