= Warburtons =

British baking firm founded by Thomas Warburton in 1876

Warburtons Limited

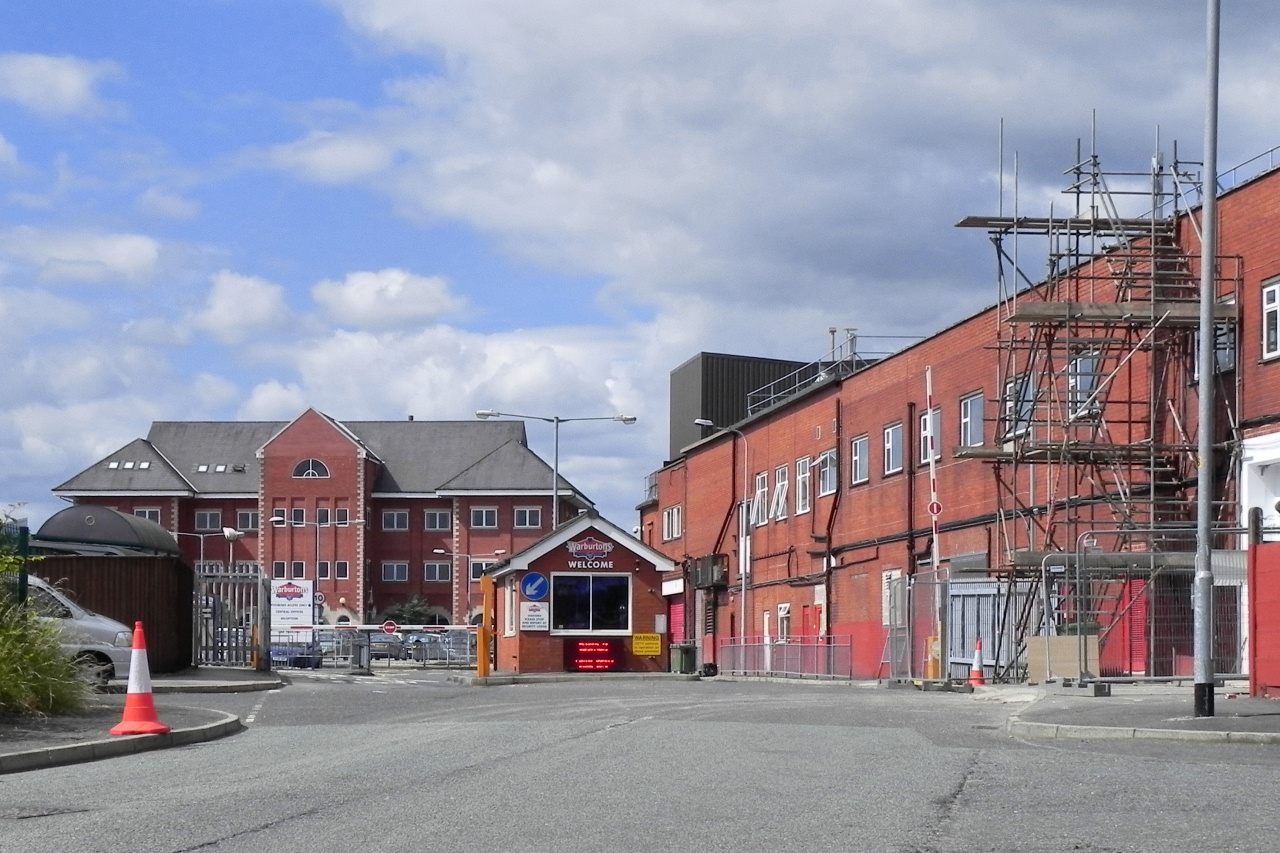
- Headquarters, Bolton
- Type: Private
- Industry: Baking
- Founded: 1876 (150 years ago)
- Founder: Thomas Warburton
- Headquarters: Bolton, Greater Manchester, England
- Key people: Jonathan Warburton (Chairman)
- Products: Bread and other bakery goods
- Revenue: £574.4 million
- Owner: Jonathan Warburton; Brett Warburton; Ross Warburton
- Number of employees: Over 5000
- Parent: Warburtons Holdings Limited
- Website: warburtons.co.uk

Warburtons Limited is a British baking firm founded by Thomas Warburton in 1876 and based in Bolton, a town formerly in Lancashire, England, and now in Greater Manchester. For much of its history Warburtons only had bakeries in Lancashire and it remains a family-owned company. As of 2018, Warburtons has 12 bakeries, 14 depots, and nearly 5000 employees around the UK.

The company embarked on a large expansion programme in the late 1990s which continued in the 2000s and it has grown across the United Kingdom after being relatively unheard of outside the North West. By 2010, it had a 24% share of the UK bread market compared with 2% when it was based solely in Bolton. In 2008, Warburtons was the most popular bread in Lancashire with a 45% market share compared with just 15% in London.

== History ==
=== Founding years ===
Ellen and Thomas Warburton bought a small grocery shop in Bolton in 1876. The business grew and Thomas' nephew Henry joined the business when he was 16 and became a skilled baker by the age of 25. Henry continued to expand the business and the location of the bakery was moved four times in 25 years finishing with the opening of Back o'th' Bank Bakery opened by Rachael Warburton in July 1915. Henry became involved in local affairs within the community and stood as a Liberal candidate. He became mayor of Bolton. Henry Warburton died in 1936.

Warburtons grew with the purchase of several smaller companies in North West England.

=== Expansion ===
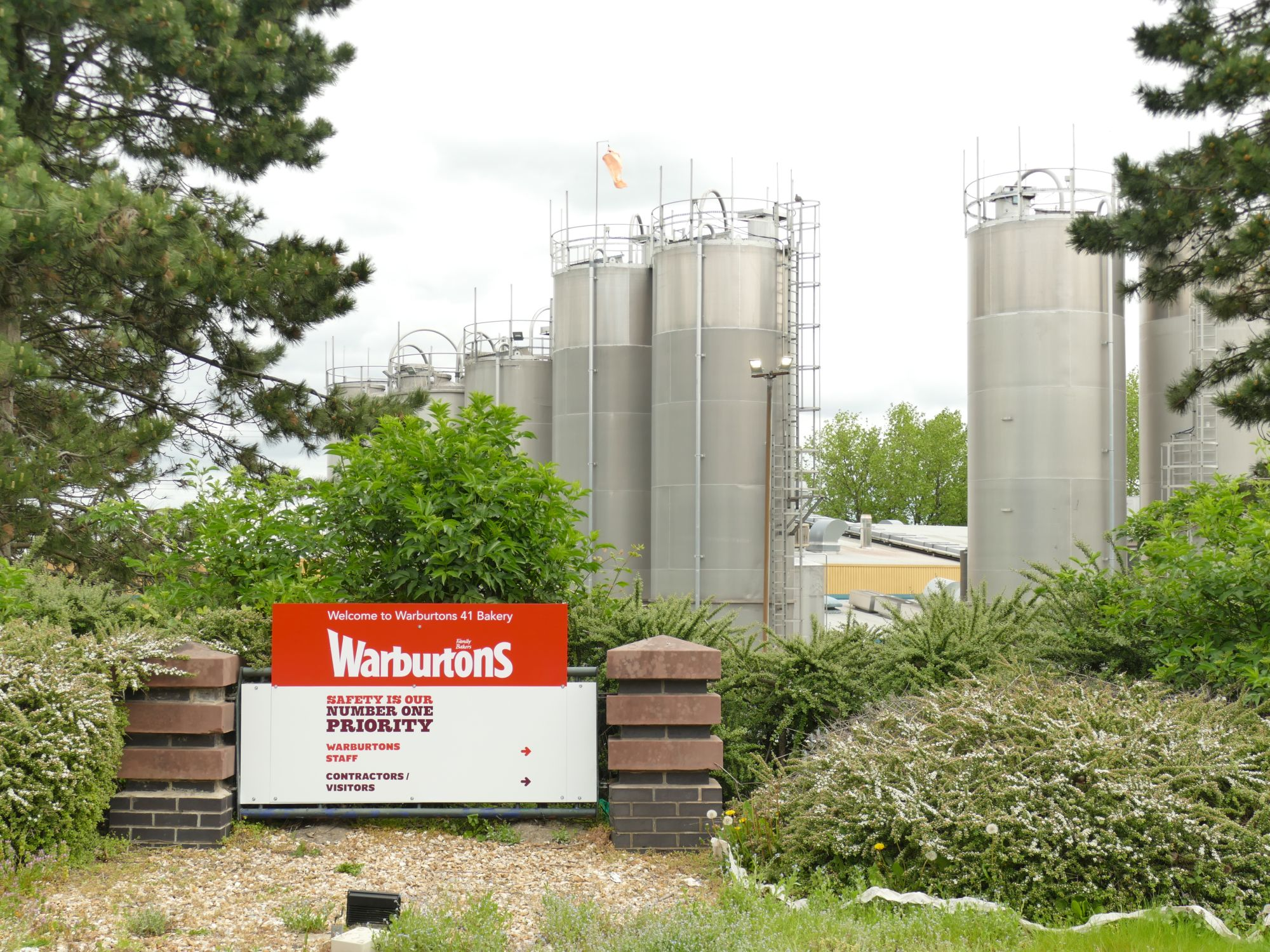
Plant north of Wakefield, West Yorkshire

Production of bread was based solely in Bolton for much of the company's history. Because of this, during transport the bread lost its freshness by the time it arrived anywhere outside the North West of England. With demand increasing from national retailers such as Tesco, Asda and Sainsbury's, in the late 1990s the company embarked on an expansion programme and opened new plants at Eastwood in Nottinghamshire, Bellshill and Wednesbury. Warburtons moved into Scotland in 1996 and by 2003 the company had a 32% share of the Scottish bread market.

=== National brand ===
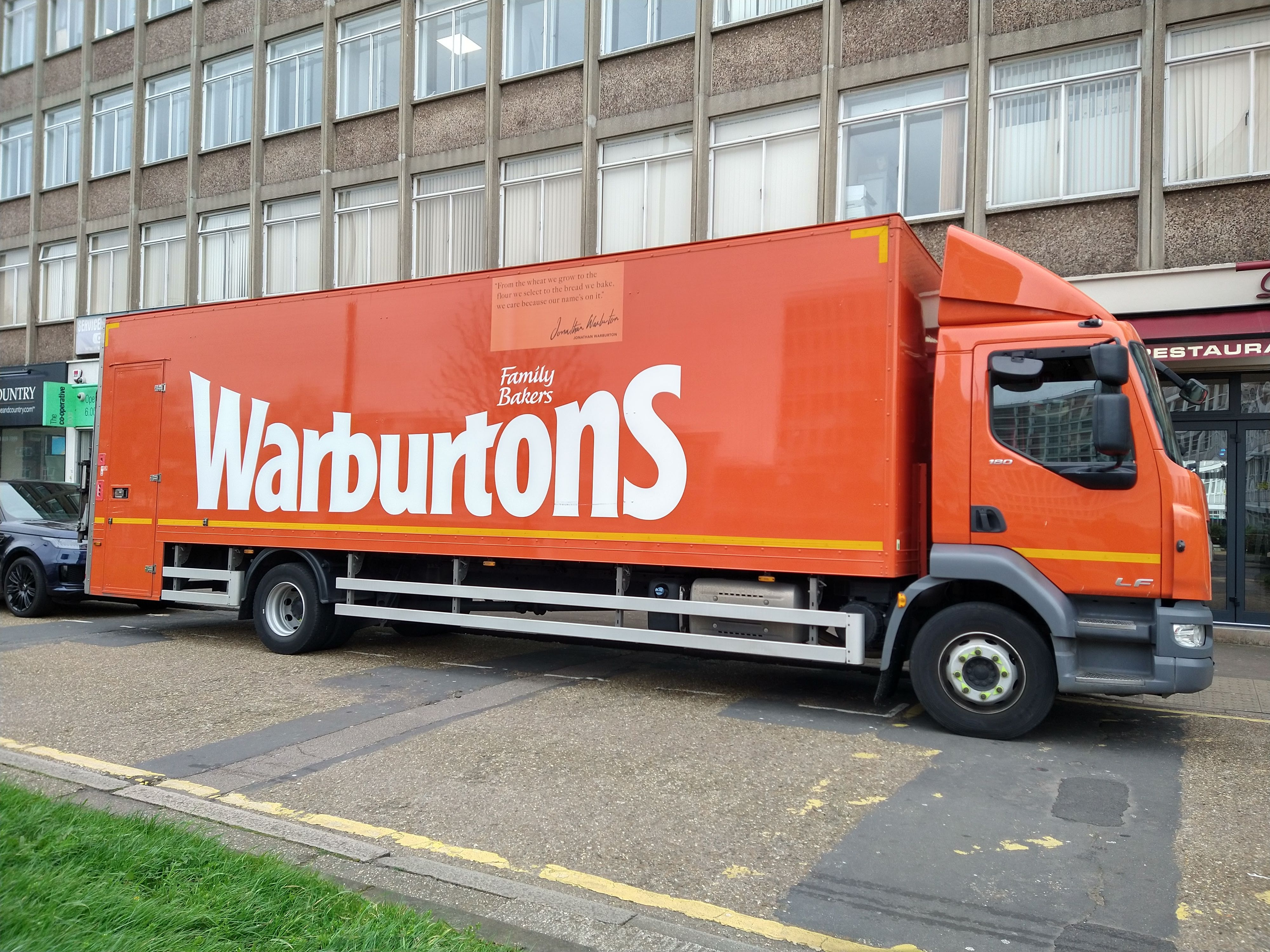
Warburtons lorry, London

In October 2003, Prince Philip, Duke of Edinburgh opened Warburtons' eleventh bakery in Enfield, North London. In 2004, Warburtons increased production in Scotland with the completion of Bellshill, phase two. Rathbones Bakeries, based in Walsall, went into administration in April 2005, and Warburtons bought a bakery at Stockton-on-Tees just off the A66 near Preston-on-Tees in January 2005, and another bakery at Rogerstone near the A467 at Newport in November 2005. A £60m 12-acre (49,000 m^{2}) super bakery in Normanton, West Yorkshire opened in March 2006, claiming to be the largest bakery in Europe. Other bakeries outside of the Lancashire area are in Newburn for Newcastle upon Tyne next to the A6085 and River Tyne.

In 2010, the company announced the closure of its Newport facility, but retained a distribution depot at Port Talbot to continue service to the South Wales market. Production was transferred to a new plant in Bristol. The lease on the Newport plant was ceded to Brace's Bakery.

In 2013, the Daily Mirror named Warburtons as Britain's best loved shopping brand ahead of Coca-Cola, Heinz, and Cadbury.

In 2015, Warburtons announced the use of Sylvester Stallone in its marketing campaign, with Stallone re-enacting parts he had played previously. Another advert involves The Muppets singing about the new brand of giant crumpets, in a style almost identical to the opening theme of The Muppet Show, whilst the advert with Peter Kay plays on the Bolton connection.

In May 2019, Robert De Niro appeared in an advert for Warburtons bagels. In 2021, George Clooney appeared in a TV advert alongside Jonathan Warburton. In 2023, Samuel L. Jackson portrayed Warburton in an advert for the Warburtons Toastie loaf.

In March 2020, Warburtons was criticised by some smaller independent retailers for prioritising delivieries to larger supermarkets as a result of the COVID-19 pandemic. In response to the UK Government's measures against COVID-19, Warburton said: "It went too far... people have been hugely fearful, unnecessarily".

In January 2023, Waitrose said it had stopped stocking Warburtons products the previous year amid a commercial dispute, "after their performance didn’t meet our expectations."

== Products ==
Warburtons makes five categories of products: Bread, Rolls, Bakery Snacks (including crumpets and potato cakes), Gluten Free and Weight Watchers.

Warburtons' staple products include the orange wrappered Toastie loaf, the blue wrappered Medium loaf and the green wrappered Thickest loaf, all of which are wrapped in wax paper.
