= Feldhues Group =

German-Irish meat processing company

- Founded: 1960s
- Headquarters: Nordrhein Westfalen, Germany; Monaghan, Ireland
- Key people: Mike Hamill

Feldhues Fun Foods GmbH is a German-Irish meat processing company and supplier. They manufacture and sell sandwich meat and holiday meats, and sliced cheese products which contain printed images including Billy Roll and Billy Bear, which became popular characters in the company and pictures of their meats became known on social media due to their potential unsettling nature. Custom images and special products can also be requested by customers.

== History ==
They were founded in the 1960s by Bernhard Feldhues who created the machinery. They opened in Metelen in 1978. Billy Roll was introduced in 1986 at IFFA in Frankfurt and Billy Bear was released afterwards. Happy Tractor and Happy Fox were introduced in 2017. Their products are created at their Monaghan branch in Ireland.

In 2005, Dublin-based company, Greencore sold the company and its Irish branch to Dutch private investment group ON Nederland BV. The machinery the company uses was later auctioned.

Pictures of their products became popular online, especially on the social networking site Reddit. They are referred to as "face meats” and Billy Roll was dubbed "ham clown" and “meat clown".
