= Safeway (Channel Islands) =

Channel Island supermarket chain

- Industry: Grocery
- Founded: 1993
- Defunct: 2011
- Fate: Defunct - Purchased by Waitrose and re-branded
- Owner: Waitrose
- Subsidiaries: Safeway Stores (Jersey) Ltd; Safeway Stores (Guernsey) Ltd
- Website: Safeway (Channel Islands)

Safeway (Channel Islands) was a supermarket chain in the Channel Islands. There were two supermarkets, one in Jersey and one in Guernsey.

The chain was founded in 1993, when Argyll Foods's Safeway division acquired them off a local businessman, Mr M D Besant.

Following Morrisons 2004 acquisition of Safeway plc, a local business, CI Traders (now Sandpiper CI), bought the two Safeway supermarkets from Morrisons in 2005 for £51 million.

In 2011 Sandpiper CI sold the stores to Waitrose, ending the Safeway name in the Channel Islands.

In February 2018, it was announced that Sandpiper CI would be rebranding its Guernsey and Jersey Food Halls as Morrisons Daily. None of the properties involved came under the previous Morrisons branding.
