= Thomas Warburton (businessman) =

English businessman

- Born: 1837; Bury, Lancashire, England
- Died: 1909 (aged 71–72)
- Occupation: Businessman
- Known for: founding Warburtons
- Spouse: Ellen Platt

Thomas Warburton (1837–1909) was an English businessman. In 1870, he founded a grocery shop which became a bakery business, known today as Warburtons. It is now the largest bakery business in the United Kingdom, owned by Jonathan, Ross and Brett Warburton, the fifth generation of the family.

== Personal life ==
Warburton and his wife, Ellen Platt, opened their first shop, in Bolton's Bow Street, in 1870. Assisted by Thomas' brother, George, six years later, Ellen began baking bread, shortly after which the business was renamed Warburtons the Bakers. Their nephew, Henry, delivered the bread via horse and cart.

Thomas and Ellen's daughter, Sarah, died in 1879.

Warburton died in 1909, aged 71 or 72. His wife survived him by eleven years.
