= McColl's =

British convenience store chain

- Logo used from 2012 to 2021
- Industry: Convenience store chain
- Founded: 1973; 53 years ago
- Founder: Martin McColl
- Defunct: September 2024; 1 year ago
- Fate: All locations converted to Morrisons Daily
- Headquarters: United Kingdom
- Brands: RS McColl's, Martin's
- Owner: Morrisons

McColl's was a British convenience shop, newsagent and post office operator, founded in 1973. The chain also traded as RS McColl's in Scotland, and used the name Martin's for its newsagent-format shops.

In May 2022, British supermarket chain Morrisons rescued McColl's from administration, with 132 stores set to close. All of the remaining shopfronts were converted to the Morrisons Daily fascia by September 2024.

As of September 2024, the defunct McColl's, RS McColl's, and Martin's trademarks are owned by Alliance Property Holdings Limited, a subsidiary company of Morrisons. The former mccolls.co.uk website now re-directs to Morrisons Daily.

== History ==
=== RS McColl ===
Logo introduced in 1998

RS McColl, colloquially known as McColl's, was a Scottish newsagent company named after Robert Smyth McColl, who was a professional footballer. It was founded in 1901 by McColl and his brother Tom.

=== Martin McColl ===
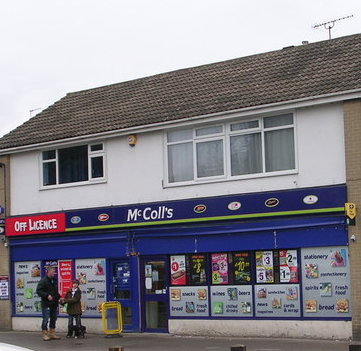
McColl's shop in York

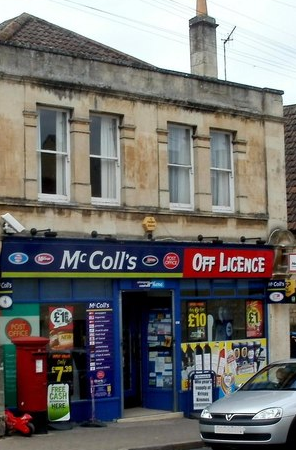
McColl's shop in Larkhall, Bath

RS McColl became part of TM Retail – formally TM Group (The Mayfair Group) – in November 1998, when Forbuoys (a subsidiary of TM Retail) acquired Martin Retail Group, creating Great Britain's largest chain of newsagents, and RS McColl's chain of newsagents. In addition to RS McColl, TM Retail's former trading names included the following subsidiaries: Mayfair Services (cigarette vending), Vendepac (drinks vending), Forbuoys, Martin's, Dillons (purchased from One Stop Stores Ltd following the takeover by Tesco of parent company T&S Stores) and McColl's.

In 2006, TM Retail was renamed Martin McColl Limited after a management buyout, with the various stores rebranded as Martin's (for the news and variety stores) or McColl's (for the convenience stores) and the stores in Scotland retaining the RS McColl name.

In August 2013, the group changed its name from Martin McColl Retail Group to McColl's Retail Group.

The company was floated on the stock market in January 2014. In July 2016, wholly owned subsidiary, Martin McColl Ltd, announced it would acquire 298 shops from The Co-operative Group (subject to Competition & Markets Authority approval) for £117 million, this meant they entered Northern Ireland for the first time, but it was short lived as all of the stores were since converted into Spar franchises.

=== Covid-19 pandemic ===
In February 2020, McColl's announced its intentions to close down 330 stores over the next three or four years while it aimed to concentrate its consumer retail business operations. McColl's changed its focus from newsagents to larger grocery stores after writing down the valuation of its company has brought the chain to a loss, with its dividend suspended as well.

In May 2022, McColl's was placed in voluntary administration and purchased by Morrisons.

=== Morrisons takeover ===
After having Morrisons' Safeway brand on around 400 product lines in over 1,300 stores since January 2018, McColl's decided to take the wholesale agreement further by having 350 of their convenience stores rebranded from McColl’s to Morrisons Daily. The first rebranded stores were operating at the start of 2021, with the 100th rebranded store opening in Ellesmere Port in October 2021. A total of 185 stores were converted to Morrisons Daily by the end of 2021. McColl's hoped to have 350 shops trading under the new format by the end of 2022.

In 2021, McColl's raised £30m to invest in the expansion of its Morrisons Daily convenience stores. The income of the convenience stores had been reduced by the coronavirus pandemic. McColl's was reported to have £170m of debt by BBC News, while The Guardian reported a lower figure of £100m of debt.

On 6 May 2022, McColl's was reported to be on the verge of financial collapse. The retailer said it was "increasingly likely" it would fall into administration unless a rescue deal were successful. The company reported that it would "be placed into administration with the objective of achieving a sale of the group to a third-party purchaser and securing the interests of creditors and employees". Earlier in the week, the listed company warned that its shares would be suspended as it was not able to meet the deadline for filing its annual results.

On 6 May 2022, it was announced that the company would enter voluntary administration after talks with Morrisons about a rescue deal failed. PricewaterhouseCoopers was appointed as administrator. At the time of the announcement, the McColl's website listed a total of 1,149 stores, with 755 branded McColl's, 270 branded Morrisons Daily, 116 branded Martin's, and eight branded RS McColl. On 9 May, Morrisons agreed terms with the administrator to acquire McColl's in a pre-packaged insolvency arrangement.

On 30 May 2022, the Competition and Markets Authority (CMA) announced it was launching an investigation into Morrison's acquisition of McColl's due to competition concerns, ordering Morrison's to run McColl's as a separate company while the investigation is being carried out.

On 13 July 2022, the CMA announced it had launched a formal investigation into Morrison's acquisition of McColl's. On 15 July 2022, Morrisons announced it had agreed to rescue McColl's pension scheme following the acquisition.

On 9 September 2022, the CMA announced it had largely cleared Morrisons acquisition of McColl's, raising concerns in 35 local areas where both brands would face reduced competition if the takeover went ahead as planned. Morrisons was then given five days to offer proposals to the CMA to address the concerns identified. On 23 September 2022, Morrisons said it was offering to divest the overlapping convenience stores to ease the CMA's concerns, which the CMA said it would accept.

On 10 October 2022, Morrisons announced it planned to sell 28 McColl's stores (26 stores in England, one store in Scotland and one store in Wales) to a purchaser or purchasers approved by the CMA due to competition concerns. The CMA said it was consulting on the proposals for selling the stores.

On 27 October 2022, the CMA announced it would not be escalating its investigation and had cleared Morrisons' acquisition of McColl's, accepting Morrisons' plan to sell 28 McColl's stores.

On 1 November 2022, Morrisons announced it would close 132 loss-making McColl's stores (putting 1,300 jobs at risk) over the remainder of the year, and convert the remaining McColl's stores into Morrisons Daily stores within the next two to three years, bringing the number of Morrisons Daily stores to more than 1,000. Morrison's convenience, online and wholesale director Joseph Sutton would take charge of McColl's from McColl's interim CEO Karen Bird and CFO Giles David. Affected employees would be offered jobs in other local Morrisons stores or other parts of the Morrisons business.

In September 2024, the final McColl's stores were converted to Morrisons Daily, ending the chain.

== Criticism ==
In November 2014, after a number of robberies in Wirral, including one in which a manager was knocked out, McColl's was fined £150,000 and ordered to pay £78,000 prosecution costs for failing to protect its staff.

In August 2021, McColl's was "named and shamed" by the UK government for not paying workers the minimum wage.
