= Foo Go =

Premade snack company

- Type: food manufacturer
- Founded: 2001
- Founder: George Robinson
- Headquarters: Lincolnshire, England
- Products: Sandwiches and buns
- Number of employees: 500
- Parent: Greencore Group
- Website: foo-go.com

Foo Go was a brand of pre-packed sandwiches and other convenience food.

Foo Go operated on a "zero waste" policy and has used water-based boards, inks, and coatings with packet windows made from cornstarch instead of the normal oil-based inks and plastic film to make the containers biodegradable.

== History ==
Foo Go was founded in 2001 by George Robinson. In 2009, Greencore Group plc bought Foo Go for £4.4M.
