= Morrisons =

British supermarket chain

Wm Morrison Supermarkets Limited
- Logo used since 2015

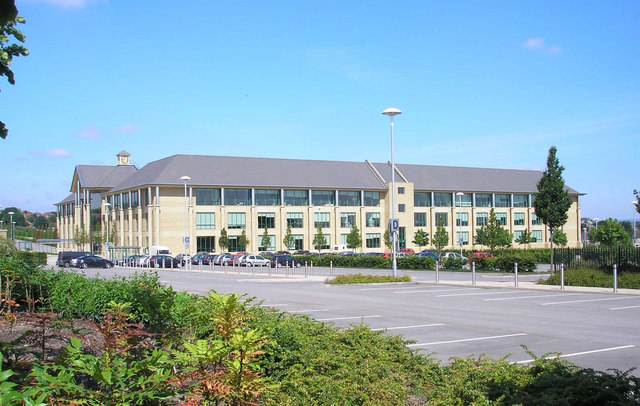
- Hilmore House in Bradford, Morrisons' head office
- Trade name: Morrisons
- Formerly: Wm Morrison (Provisions) Limited (1940–1967); Wm Morrison Supermarkets Limited (1967–1981); Wm Morrison Supermarkets PLC (1981–2021)
- Type: Private
- Industry: Retail
- Founded: 1899; 127 years ago
- Founder: William Morrison
- Headquarters: Bradford, England
- Key people: Rami Baitiéh (CEO)
- Products: Books; Clothing; Florist; Food and drink; Homeware; Magazines; Petrol; Tobacco
- Brands: Morrisons Daily; Safeway
- Revenue: ▲£18,479 million (2022)
- Operating income: ▲£251 million (2022)
- Net income: ▼ —£25 million (2022)
- Owner: Clayton, Dubilier & Rice
- Number of employees: 110,000 (2021)
- Subsidiaries: Motor Fuel Group (20%)
- Website: morrisons.com

Wm Morrison Supermarkets Limited, trading as Morrisons, is the fifth largest supermarket chain in the United Kingdom. As of 2021, the company had 497 supermarkets across Great Britain, and one in Gibraltar. The company is headquartered in Bradford, England.

Founded in 1899 by William Morrison, it began as an egg and butter stall in Rawson Market, Bradford. Until 2004, its store locations were focused in the North of England but with the takeover of Safeway in that year, the company's presence increased significantly in the South of England, Wales and Scotland. As of February 2021, Morrisons employed 110,000 employees and served around 11 million customers each week.

The company was listed on the London Stock Exchange until it was acquired by private equity firm Clayton, Dubilier & Rice (CD&R) in October 2021. Many changes were made after the takeover, and the company is struggling financially.

Morrisons is the fifth largest supermarket in the United Kingdom by market share (8.6%), overtaken for fourth place by Aldi in September 2022.

== History ==
=== Founding ===
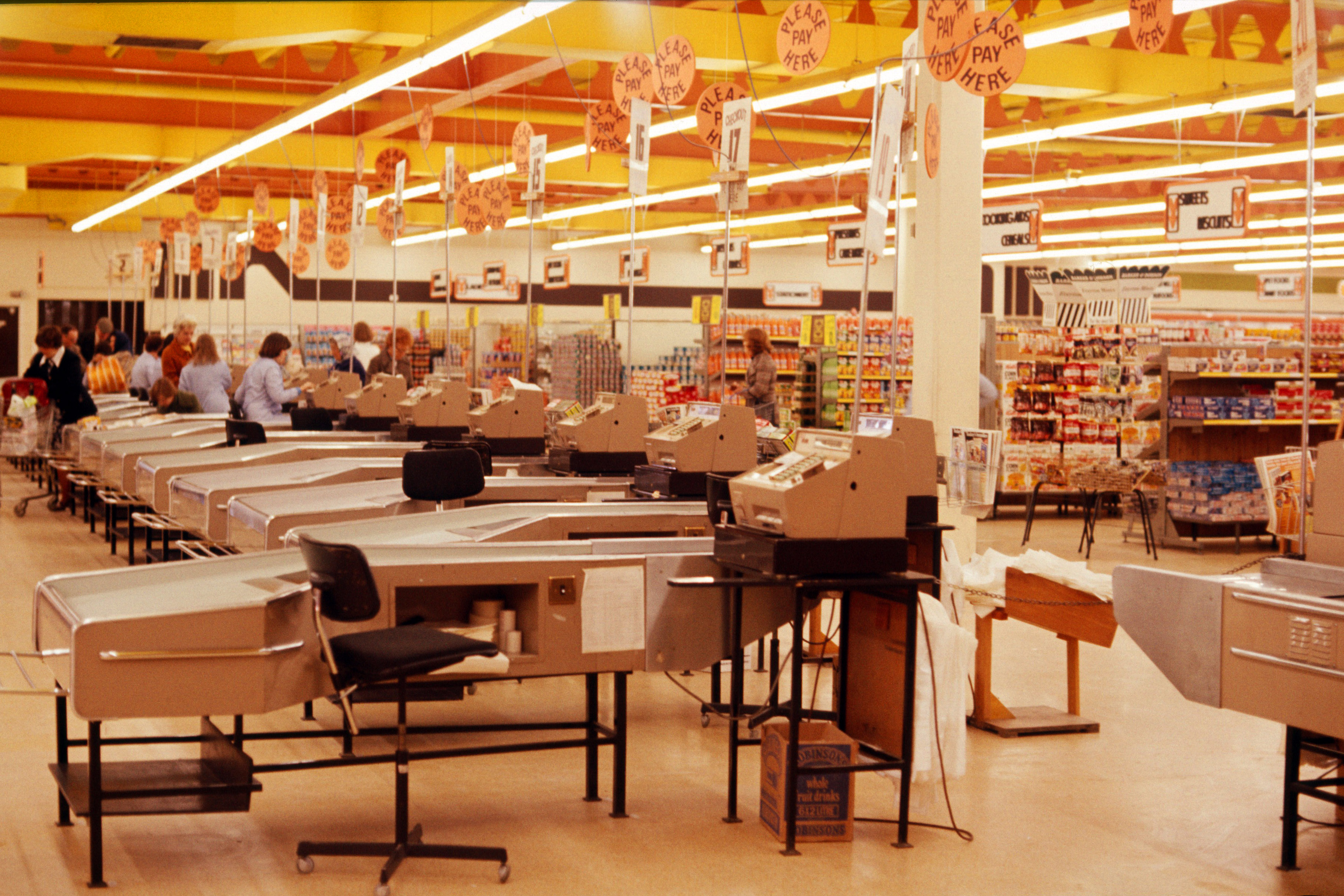
Interior of the Merrion Centre, Leeds in the 1970s.

The company was founded as Wm Morrison Limited in June 1899 by William Morrison, who started the business as an egg and butter merchant in Rawson Market, Bradford, England.

His son Ken Morrison took over the company in 1952, aged 21. In 1958, Morrisons opened a small shop in the city centre. It was the first self-service store in Bradford, the first store to have prices on its products, and it had three checkouts. The company opened its first supermarket, "Victoria", in the Girlington district of Bradford in 1961.

In 1967, Morrisons became a public limited company listed on the London Stock Exchange.

=== Safeway ===
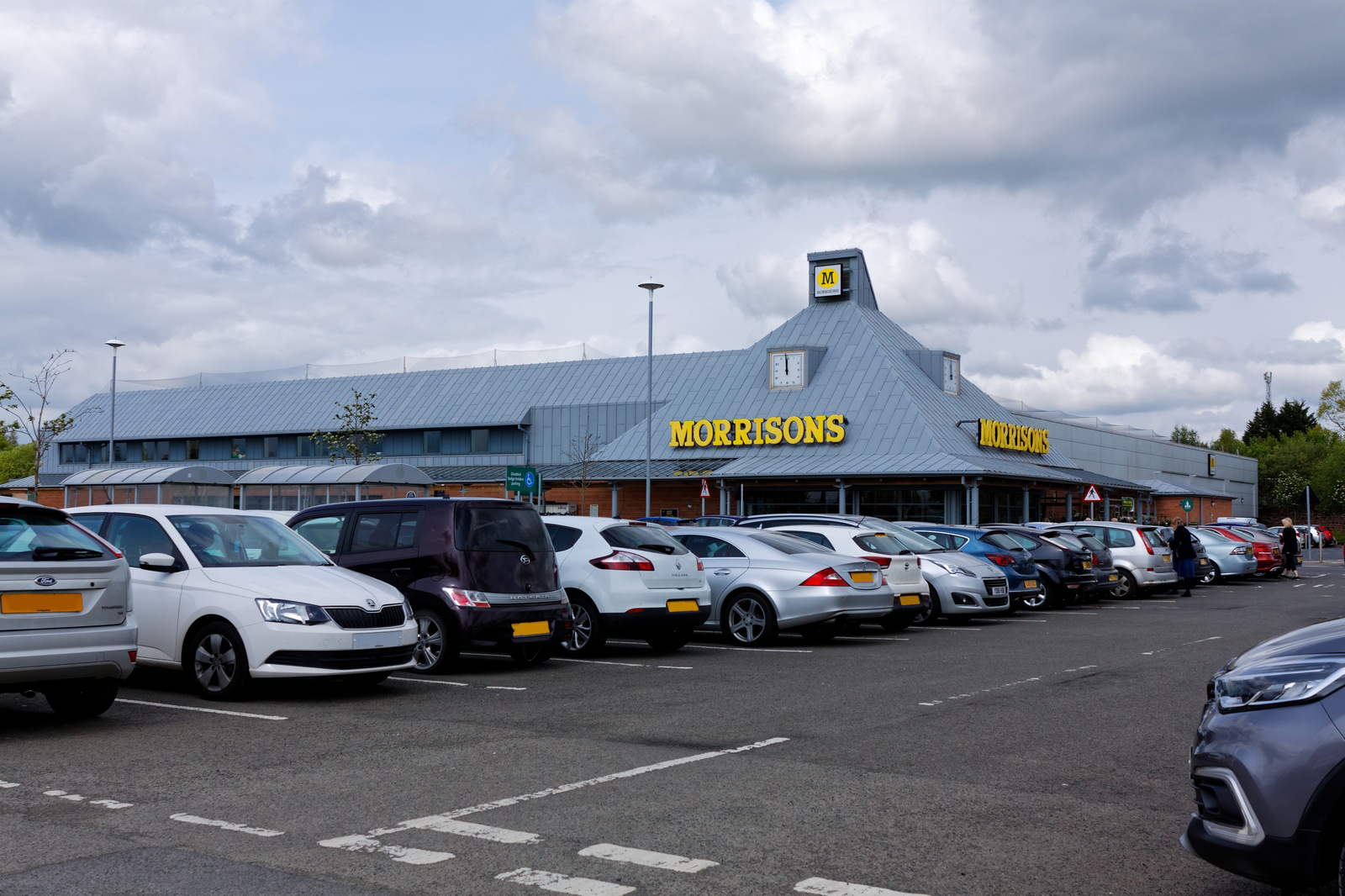
Morrisons expansion into Scotland following acquisition of Safeway led to the first Scottish store opening in Kilmarnock in 2004

In March 2004, Morrisons acquired Safeway, a British supermarket chain which owned 479 stores, giving Morrisons a larger presence in southern England. The company was purchased for £3.3 billion, comprising 1 new Morrisons share (enabling Safeway shareholders to have a 50% stake in the enlarged group and reducing the Morrison family's shareholding to 18%), plus 60 pence in cash (paid for by the divestment of 52 overlapping stores) for each Safeway share held. The acquisition quickly ran into difficulties caused in part by changing the accounting systems six weeks before the transaction was completed, leading to a series of profit warnings being issued by Morrisons, poor financial results and a reversion to manual systems.

The programme of store conversions from Safeway to Morrisons was the largest of its kind in British retail history, focusing initially on the retained stores which were freehold, over 25,000 sq ft (2,300 m^{2}) with separate car parks. Within a few weeks, Safeway carrier bags were replaced by those of Morrisons, and Morrisons own-brand products began to appear in Safeway stores.

Originally 52 shops were to be compulsorily divested after the takeover. Two closed for other reasons, John Lewis Partnership purchased 19 to be part of its Waitrose chain, J Sainsbury plc purchased a further 14, and Tesco bought 10 in October 2004. At the time Morrisons chose not to move into the convenience store sector, although it later did so with its M Local stores. In accordance with this policy decision, 114 smaller 'Safeway Compact' stores were sold to rival supermarket chain Somerfield in 2004 in a two-part deal worth £260.2 million.

In 2004, the first Morrisons store in Scotland was officially opened in Kilmarnock. In Northern Ireland Morrisons sold the Safeway stores, and a store in Bangor that opened after the Morrisons takeover, to Asda. Waitrose purchased five stores in 2005, followed by six more on 18 July 2006, including the former Safeway store in Hexham, Northumberland, which became England's most northerly Waitrose branch. In May 2005, Morrisons announced the closure of Safeway and BP joint venture convenience store/petrol station. Under the deal, the premises had been split 50/50 between the two companies.

Morrisons also sold Safeway's Channel Islands stores, in Guernsey and Jersey, to CI Traders where the stores continued to trade as Safeway, although the products they sold carried the brand names of chains such as Iceland. In 2011, Sandpiper CI/CI Traders sold the Channel Island Safeway stores to Waitrose, and the Safeway brand disappeared from the Channel Islands. On the Isle of Man, the Douglas store was sold to Shoprite and the Ramsey store was sold to The Co-operative Food. The Gibraltar store was originally offered for sale, but was ultimately converted. In November 2006, plans were submitted for the extension and redevelopment of the store to introduce the full Morrisons format.

In September 2005, the company announced the closure of former Safeway depots in Kent, Bristol and Warrington with the loss of 2,500 jobs. The Kent depot was later sold to upmarket rival Waitrose, and the Warrington one to frozen food rival Iceland. Part of the Bristol depot was sold to Gist. The store conversion process was completed on 24 November 2005 when the final Safeway fascia disappeared from the UK.

=== Morrison family step down ===
Following the acquisition of Safeway, Morrisons encountered a number of difficulties. The company had issued five profits warnings since the acquisition, and it was felt that Morrisons' "northern" format did not work as well in the south. To reinvigorate its new national image, Morrisons appointed Dutchman Marc Bolland, the chief operating officer of Heineken, as its new Chief Executive.

On 13 March 2008, Sir Ken Morrison retired as chairman after 55 years at the company, and was made Honorary President.

=== Expansion and partnerships ===
When the Co-operative Group completed its takeover of the Somerfield supermarket chain in March 2009, it was required to sell a number of stores by the Competition Commission. Morrisons purchased 35 stores from the combined group, mostly trading under the Somerfield name. These new stores were the first of more than 100 identified by Morrisons for expansion into smaller supermarkets, with the aim of having a store within 15 minutes of every UK home.

Marc Bolland departed to become the CEO of Marks & Spencer in December 2009, and Dalton Philips was appointed as his replacement in January 2010.

In 2010, Morrisons signed a deal with budget retailer Peacocks, the first concession store opened as part of a refurbishment at the retailer's store in Idle, Bradford. The Peacocks section was rolled out into other stores before launching its own children's-wear brand 'Nutmeg' into 85 stores on 21 March 2013.

The first Morrisons M local store opened in Ilkley, Yorkshire, in 2011. All M Local stores were later rebranded as the short-lived "My Local" chain in 2015.

In December 2012, a television advertising campaign which showed a dog being given pieces of Christmas pudding was criticised by the British Veterinary Association and the Kennel Club, as raisins are harmful to dogs. Morrisons said that veterinarian advice they received said that there would be minimal risk.

In May 2013, Morrisons formed a partnership with Ocado to use its technology systems and distribution infrastructure to help launch its own online service.

=== Restructuring ===
Richard Pennycook, who had joined Morrisons in October 2005, was replaced as Chief Financial Officer at Morrisons in June 2013 by Trevor Strain, previously Finance Director Corporate.

In February 2014, it emerged that younger members of the founding Morrison family, who own 10% of the company and who are thought to include two of Honorary President Sir Ken Morrison's children, William Morrison Junior and Andrea Shelley, along with Sir Ken Morrison's niece and her husband, Susan and Nigel Pritchard, had approached a number of private equity firms about taking the company private. They were said to be unhappy about the company's financial performance, and Dalton Philips's corporate strategy.

Following a new three-year corporate strategy revealed in March 2014 aimed at recovering sales and market share, at Morrisons Annual General Meeting in June 2014 Morrisons former chairman Sir Ken Morrison criticised Dalton Philips's approach. Morrison's nephew Chris Blundell, who controls most of the remaining family stake in the supermarket, agreed, telling told the board it needed rescuing, and welcomed the decision by chairman Sir Ian Gibson to leave the business in June 2015.

In June 2014, Morrisons announced that plans had been put in place to cut 2,600 jobs as a result of changes to its management structure. Morrisons stated that it had trialled the new structure and believed that better performance was achieved via these methods. These cuts would primarily affect department manager and supervisory positions. Morrisons claimed they would create 1,000 jobs in Morrisons M local convenience stores and 3,000 in new supermarkets. Following this, Morrisons sold its distribution centre in Kent to a real estate investment company for £97.8 million. The depot in Kemsley was to be immediately leased back to the supermarket chain on a 25-year agreement, for a rent of £5.4 million per annum.

Following a 3.1% drop in like-for-like sales in the Christmas 2014 trading period, Sir Ian Gibson stood down six months early and was replaced by former Tesco chief financial officer Andrew Higginson at the end of January 2015. On 25 February 2015, Morrisons named former Tesco director David Potts as its new chief executive. Dalton Philips and five other executives also left the company in March 2015.

Morrisons also announced the closure of ten loss-making stores (eight former Netto UK stores and two former Somerfield stores, bought under Philips's leadership) in Cramlington, Accrington, Ravensthorpe, Bransholme (Hull), Telford, West Bromwich, Wallasey (Seacombe), Newton le Willows, Rugby and Crawley. In addition, six unprofitable convenience stores would close, and the roll-out of the convenience store chain would be slowed, as a batch of 40 sites would no longer be bought.

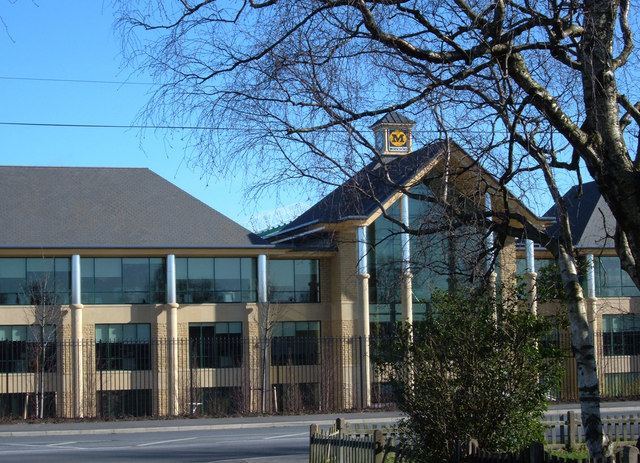
Morrisons' headquarters in Bradford, West Yorkshire

In June 2015, Morrisons cut the price of 200 'everyday items' by up to 33% The store chain's like-for-like sales had fallen by 2.9% in the first three months of 2015, after falling 2.6% in the last three months of 2014. The company responded by deciding to 'simplify' its head office in Bradford at the cost of 720 jobs.

In September 2015, Morrisons announced the sale of its 140 M Local stores to Mike Greene and Greybull Capital, to be re-branded My Local, for £25 million and that it planned to close 11 supermarkets, with a reported 900 jobs lost. In January 2016 Morrisons bosses announced that a further 7 stores would be closing to help optimise their existing assets and address areas of underperformance.

Following a well-publicised crash in UK milk prices in November 2015, Morrisons launched a variety milk labelled 'For Farmers', with a large Union Jack on the label, claiming an extra 23p per 4-pint bottle would to be given to farmers – 10p per litre. Following complaints, Morrisons admitted that the extra money was actually paid to the supplier of the milk, Arla Foods, to be divided among several countries, with only a fifth of the 23p going to UK farmers. Morrisons later changed the scheme in 2017 such that the total additional payment went directly to a selected group of 300 British farmers. A smaller group of 50 farmers were tasked with supplying the range, with additional welfare standards applied to the production of the milk.

From March 2020, the company aimed to cut down 3,000 management roles, and created 7,000 shop-floor jobs as part of its restructuring plan.

In December 2020, Morrisons was criticised for retaining Paula Vennells on its board, despite her role as CEO of the Post Office during the subpostmasters' scandal and criticism of her leadership there as "both cruel and incompetent" by a Conservative peer and various MPs. Vennells eventually left her role as a non-executive director on 26 April 2021.

=== CD&R takeover ===
In June 2021, Morrisons rejected a £5.5 billion takeover bid from private equity firm Clayton, Dubilier & Rice (CD&R) believing it "significantly undervalued" the company.

In July 2021 a bid to take over Morrisons, led by US private equity firm, Fortress Investment Group and backed by the Canada Pension Plan and Koch Industries, valuing the company at £6.3 billion ($8.7 billion), was made. This bid was provisionally accepted by the board, subject to shareholder approval, on 3 July 2021. Following the Fortress bid, Apollo Global were considering a bid, leading to speculation of a bidding war, but Apollo Global withdrew and supported the Fortress bid. On 6 August 2021, the Fortress-led consortium increased its offer to £6.7 billion ($9.29 billion) after Silchester International Investors, Morrisons largest shareholder, said the previous offer was too low. The Morrisons board once again recommended the deal to shareholders. However, on 19 August 2021 an improved offer of £7 billion from CD&R was recommended by the board of Morrisons to shareholders; the board dropped its recommendation for Fortress's offer.

In October 2021 the £7 billion CD&R bid was accepted; the takeover was approved by the High Court on 26 October 2021.

In May 2022, Morrisons purchased McColl's in a pre-packaged insolvency arrangement with its administrator, with all stores eventually converting to the Morrisons Daily fascia.

In February 2023, 16 months after the CD&R takeover of the 124-year-old chain, it was reported as having "fallen into a hole that just keeps getting deeper".

The chain's underlying profits had dropped by 15% to £828 million in the year ending 30 October; sales dropped by 4.2% despite prices increasing sharply—implying an even greater loss in volume of sales—for a pre-tax loss of £33 million. Morrisons' net debt obligations had been £3.2bn before the CD&R takeover, and had increased to £7.5 billion. A former senior Morrisons executive said "[CD&R] paid too much and now they have to claw that back". Unlike any other UK supermarket, Morrisons has a manufacturing arm including abattoirs, vegetable packing houses and fish processing plants comprising a vertically integrated supply chain. An industry insider suggested that this may be sold, which would mean a complete change of course for the company.

On 6 November 2023 Rami Baitiéh succeeded David Potts as Chief Executive.

In December 2025, Morrisons lost a legal challenge over whether VAT should be charged on its rotisserie chickens. On 17 December 2025, a tribunal judge said HM Revenue & Customs had not ruled the chickens to be zero-rated for VAT and Morrisons failed to disclose key facts about special packaging it used to control the meat's temperature. In May 2026, Morrisons were fined £750,000 over 51 hygiene concerns in their Cwmbran store, despite management having been aware of the issues for "over a month." Later that year, their Cheltenham and Aberystwyth stores were described as having food hygiene issues severe enough to pose a threat to human life.

== Animal welfare ==
In 2016, Morrisons pledged to stop sourcing eggs from caged hens by 2025. It met this target five years early, becoming the first major UK retailer to sell only free-range eggs in 2020. In 2024, Morrisons joined a letter by Compassion in World Farming urging the UK government to ban cages for egg-laying hens.

On 16 August 2021, a worker led a protest against the company for raising deformed birds at four of its intensive farms. The Independent reported that campaigners from Open Cages, Animal Equality UK and The Humane League UK urged Morrisons to sign the Better Chicken Commitment (BCC), banning the use of fast-growing breeds susceptible to lameness and heart attacks, and giving birds natural light and more space. The company responded that they cared about animal welfare, required suppliers to maintain standards, and had asked for a full investigation.

In May 2025, footage of pig abuse was taken at a Lincolnshire pig farm that supplies Morrisons, following which the supermarket suspended supplies.

== Financial performance ==
The financial results have been as follows:

52/53 weeks to	Turnover (£m)	Profit/(loss) (£m)	
52/53 weeks to	Turnover (£m)	Before tax	After tax
30 October 2022	18,479	(33.0)	(25.0)
2 February 2020	17,536	408.0	348.0
3 February 2019	17,735	320.0	244.0
4 February 2018	17,262	380.0	311.0
29 January 2017	16,317	325.0	305.0
31 January 2016	16,122	217.0	222.0
1 February 2015	16,816	(792.0)	(761.0)
2 February 2014	17,680	(176.0)	(238.0)
3 February 2013	18,116	879.0	647.0
29 January 2012	17,663	947.0	690.0
30 January 2011	16,479	874.0	632.0
31 January 2010	15,410	858.0	598.0
1 February 2009	14,528	655.0	460.0
3 February 2008	12,969	612.0	554.0
4 February 2007	12,462	369.0	247.6
29 January 2006	12,115	(312.9)	(250.3)
30 January 2005	12,116	193.0	105.0
1 February 2004	4,944	319.9	197.6
2 February 2003	4,290	282.5	186.3
3 February 2002	3,915	243.0	143.7
4 February 2001	3,496	219.1	120.0
29 January 2000	2,969	189.2	103.1

== Current operations ==
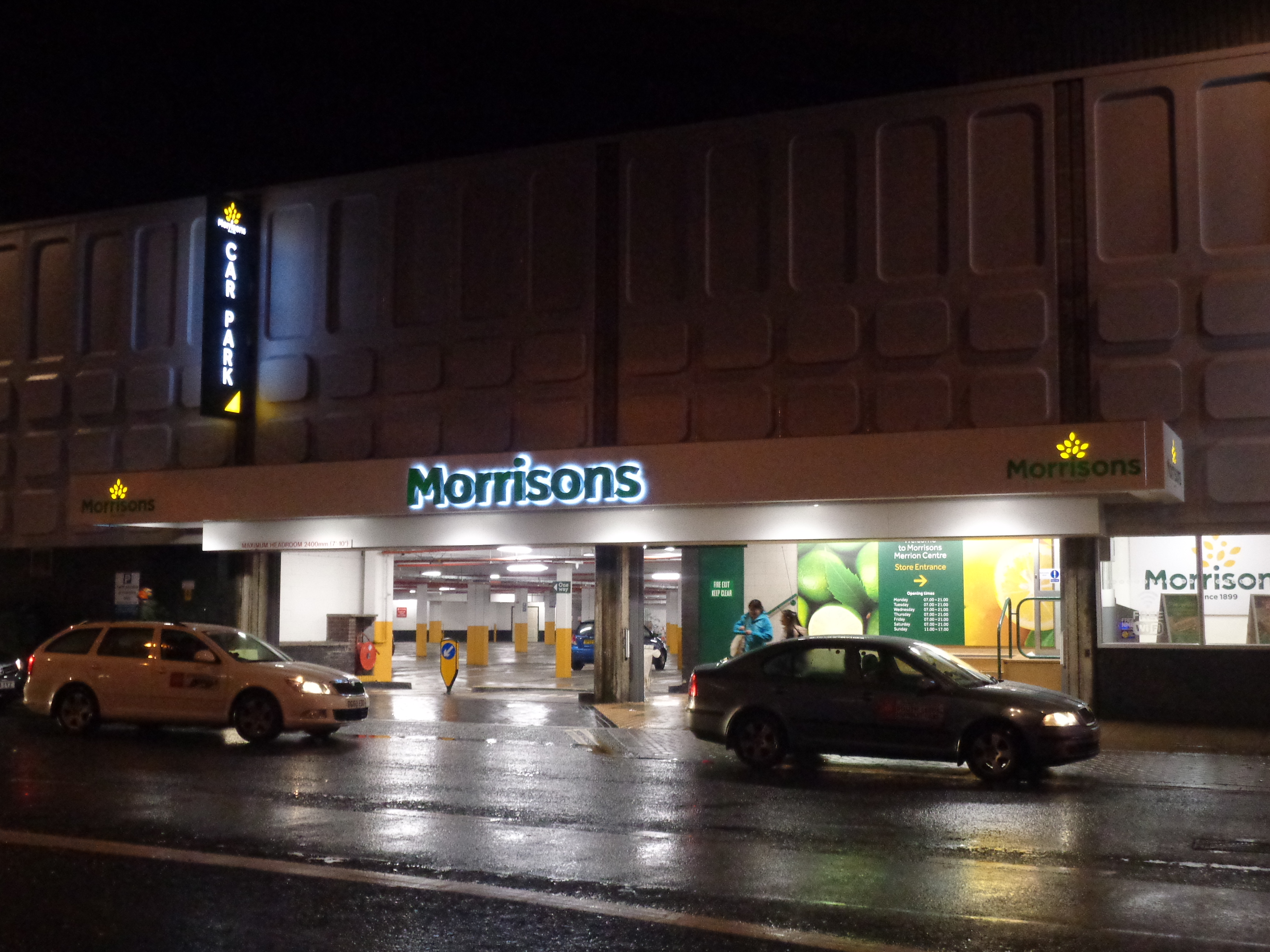
A Morrisons branch at the Merrion Centre, Leeds showing new branding introduced in 2015

In July 2020, Morrisons had 497 superstores in the United Kingdom, including those it retained following its purchase of Safeway plc. Until 2004, Morrisons superstores were largely concentrated in the English Midlands and the North of England, but had expanded southwards, beginning with a store at Erith, Greater London, which opened in 1998.

In April 2021, Morrisons said that it would replace plastic bags with paper bags to cut plastic use.

=== Store formats ===
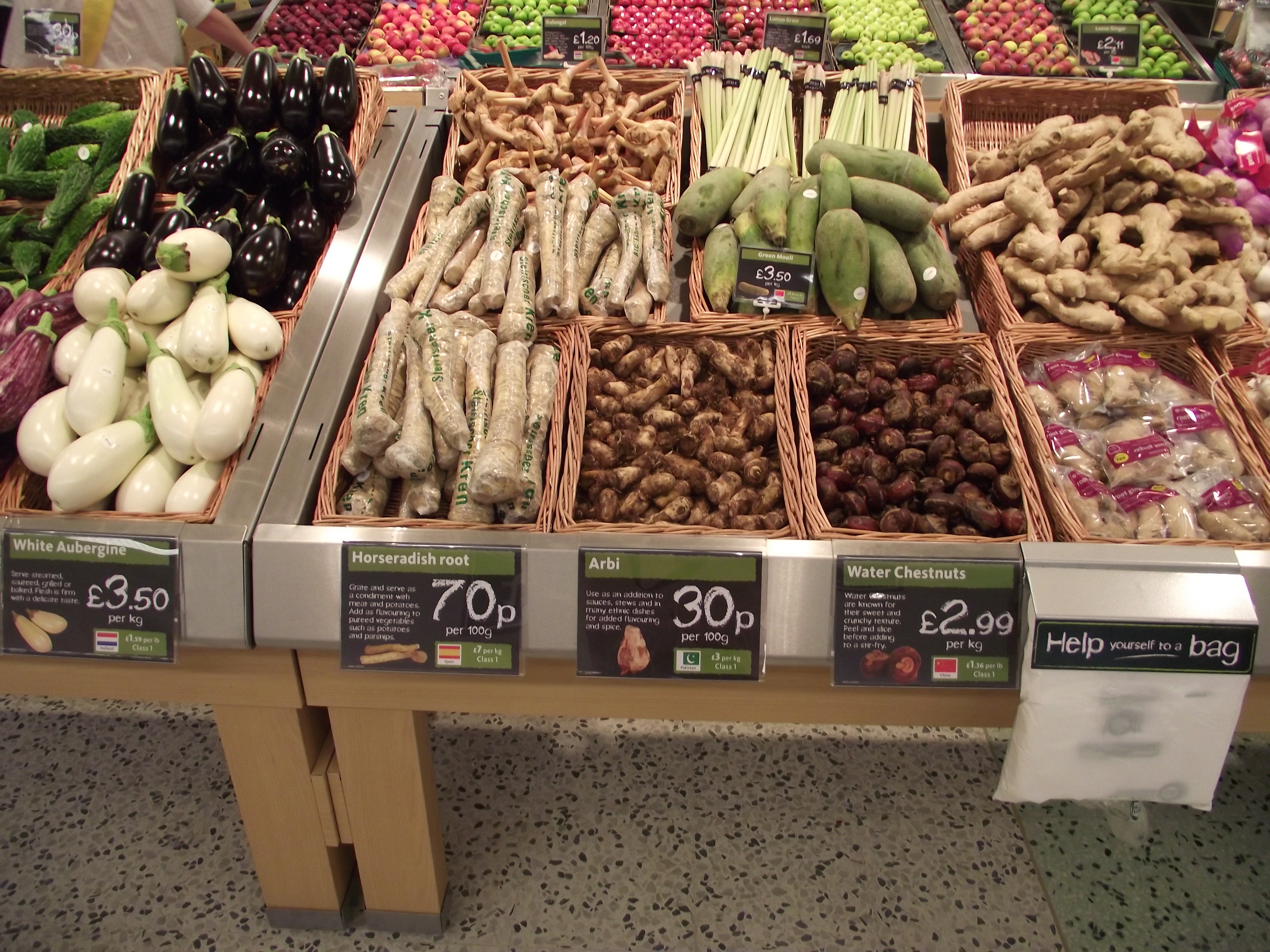
Morrisons "Fresh Format" Produce department in Swinton, Manchester.

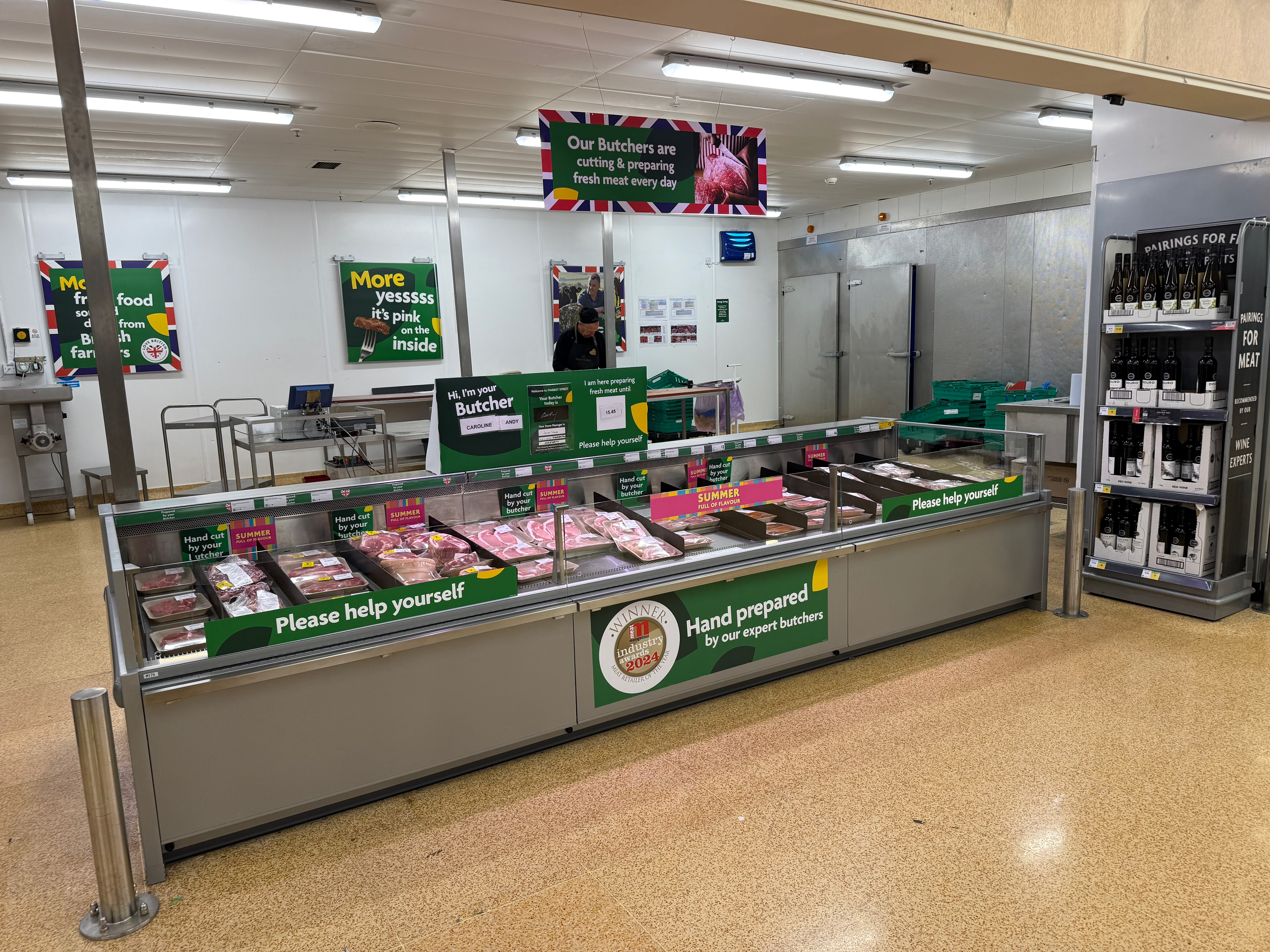
A butcher works in the "Market Street" department, in Hunslet, Leeds, May 2025. This store is different in that there is no service counter, instead being self service.

Most Morrisons superstores have produce in Market Street. Packaged meat is near or next to a butcher's counter, a delicatessen with cheese fridge is nearby, and there is a rotisserie counter named Oven Fresh.

=== Convenience stores ===
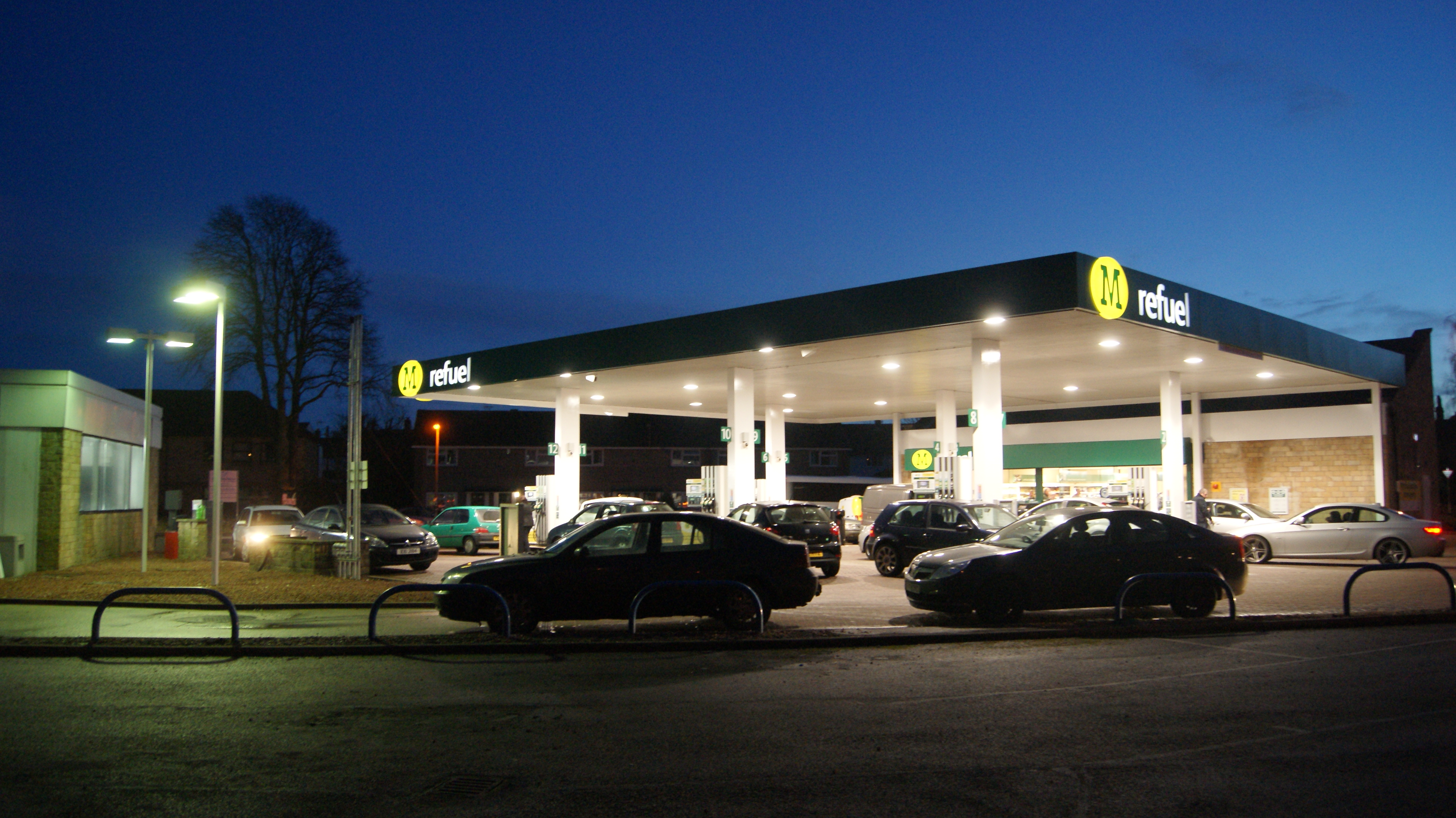
A Morrisons petrol station in Wetherby, West Yorkshire, England

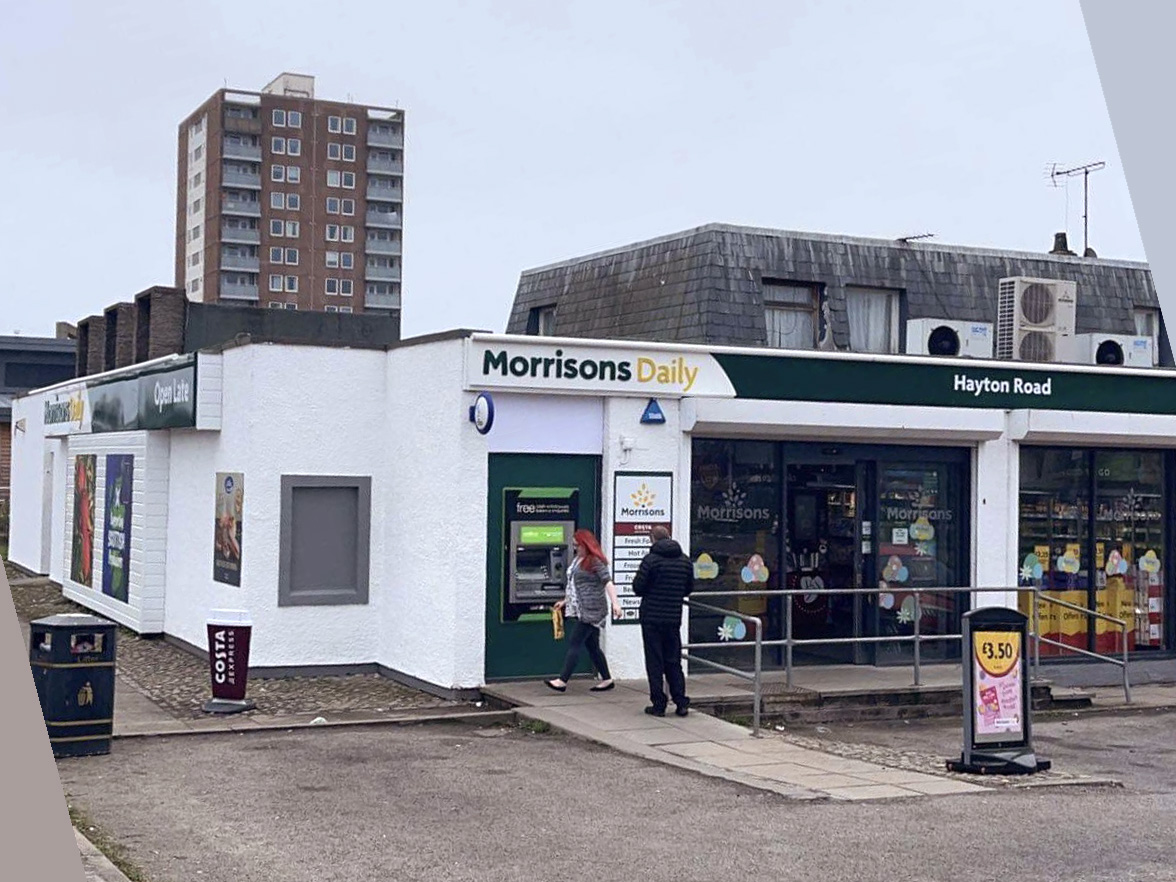
A Morrisons Daily store in Aberdeen

Following the failure of the supermarket's M Local stores, Morrisons returned to the convenience market in 2016 with a new chain of five trial forecourt stores under the Morrisons Daily brand in partnership with Motor Fuel Group. Soon after in 2017, this trial ended with the stores closed and a new partnership was formed with Rontec to open 40 stores across the company's forecourts. In 2019, Morrisons Daily stores operated by MPK Garages and Essar began to trade under a similar deal.

In 2018, Morrisons agreed on a franchise and wholesale supply deal with SandpiperCI to operate 43 Morrisons Daily convenience stores in the Channel Islands, which were previously operated under the Nisa brand. By 2022, SandpiperCI had converted 19 of their stores in the Channel Islands to the Morrisons Daily format, including the former Benest's of Millbrook store at Lisbon House.

A partnership agreement in 2021 saw Morrisons and McColl's committing to the conversion of 300 existing McColl's convenience stores into Morrisons Daily stores over the next three years, following a successful trial of 30 conversions in the months prior. This extension is of a deal, first struck in 2017, which saw Morrisons acting as McColl's sole supplier until at least 2027, with the supermarket supplying over 1,200 of their stores. Morrisons converted all McColl's stores to the Morrisons Daily fascia by September 2024.

Morrisons revived the Safeway brand in 2016 for use in stores of its wholesale customers and in Morrisons Daily stores, along with two MPK Garages forecourt stores which operate with Safeway Daily branding.

=== Online retail ===
In 2012, the group launched its first retail website called "Morrisons Cellar" selling wine from around the world.

Unlike its competitors, Morrisons did not offer online shopping for many years. In May 2013 Morrisons announced a partnership with Ocado to use its technology systems and distribution infrastructure to help launch its own online service. Morrisons also signed a deal with Amazon to supply products for their Prime Pantry.

=== Market share ===
Morrisons market share decreased after its purchase of Safeway, but it eventually grew again after the store disposals and conversions.

Morrisons' UK market share declined steadily since 2019; in January 2025 it was 8.6% – behind Tesco (28.5%), Sainsbury's (15.9%), Asda (12.6%) and Aldi (10.2%), and ahead of Lidl (7.2%).

According to CACI, as of 2006, Morrisons had market dominance in 10 postcode areas, half of which were in its home county of Yorkshire; SY (Shrewsbury), LD (Llandrindod Wells), WS (Walsall), TS (Teesside), TD (Hawick), BD (Bradford), HG (Harrogate), LS (Leeds), WF (Wakefield) and HD (Huddersfield).

=== Vertical integration ===
Morrisons produce more than half of its products in-house.

=== Home-delivery service ===
Morrisons now offer a home delivery service, as do most UK supermarkets.

In June 2020, at an early stage of the COVID-19 pandemic in the United Kingdom Morrisons, introduced a home delivery program with telephone ordering for elderly and vulnerable people, limited to those residing within 10 miles of a Morrisons shop. Morrison's Doorstep Delivery continued to be available, with some changes (in particular, a limit of three items per order to prevent stockpiling was dropped), after pandemic restrictions were removed.

=== Petrol stations ===
Morrisons used to operate 400 petrol stations across the UK, offering Petrol and Diesel at all sites and LPG Autogas at selected sites. Most petrol stations are located in the car park area within selected stores, but there are also a number of standalone petrol stations operated by either Morrisons Daily or Morrisons Select. All petrol stations were sold to MFG in 2024.

Over the years, Morrisons petrol stations underwent several different re-brands and colour schemes. These were:

Petrol station branding	Colour scheme	Example image(s)	Years introduced	Notes/Comments
Miles Better Value	Black text on yellow		Pre-circa 1998	These colour schemes remained on some petrol stations until 2008.
Miles Better Value	Yellow text on black v1		Pre-circa 1998	These colour schemes remained on some petrol stations until 2008.
Miles Better Value	Yellow text on black v2		circa 1998 — 2007	These colour schemes remained on some petrol stations until 2008.
Miles Better Value	Yellow with green text on white		2007–2011	These colour schemes remained on some petrol stations until 2020.
Miles Better Value	Grey with green text on white		2007–2011	These colour schemes remained on some petrol stations until 2020.
M Refuel	White text on green		2011–2016	These colour schemes remained on some petrol stations until 2020.
Morrisons Daily / Select	White and yellow text on green		2016 — present	

==== Fuel cards ====
For many years until 2014, Morrisons petrol stations provided a loyalty card scheme known as the Miles card. Each member earned 10 points whenever they purchased a litre of fuel, along with a £5 shopping voucher if they bought a total of 500 litres or more. This was replaced by the Match & More card in 2014, followed by the More card in 2016 and My Morrisons in 2021, later rebranded as Morrisons More with deals such as Fiver, where purchases give customers points, 5000 points being worth £5 in 2023.

Morrisons also offer the fuelGenie fuel card scheme.

== Former operations ==
=== Kiddicare ===
In 2011, Morrisons bought children's retailer Kiddicare for £70 million to give it the knowledge to sell clothing and homewares online. In 2012 10 former Best Buy stores from the Carphone Warehouse were acquired to expand Kiddicare into retail stores. Kiddicare was sold to the Endless private equity firm for £2 million in July 2014, and sold on to Worldstores two months later for an undisclosed sum.

=== FreshDirect ===
Morrisons purchased a 10% stake in New York-based online grocer FreshDirect for £31 million in 2011. After having sent a team to New York to learn from the business ahead of the predicted launch in 2013, Morrisons began a home delivery initiative in January 2014. In March 2014 Morrisons CEO Dalton Phillips announced the company had agreed to sell its stake in FreshDirect due to financial difficulties the company was facing and, as it had set up its own online shopping site, it no longer needed FreshDirect. The sale was completed in August 2016 for £45 million.

=== Convenience stores ===
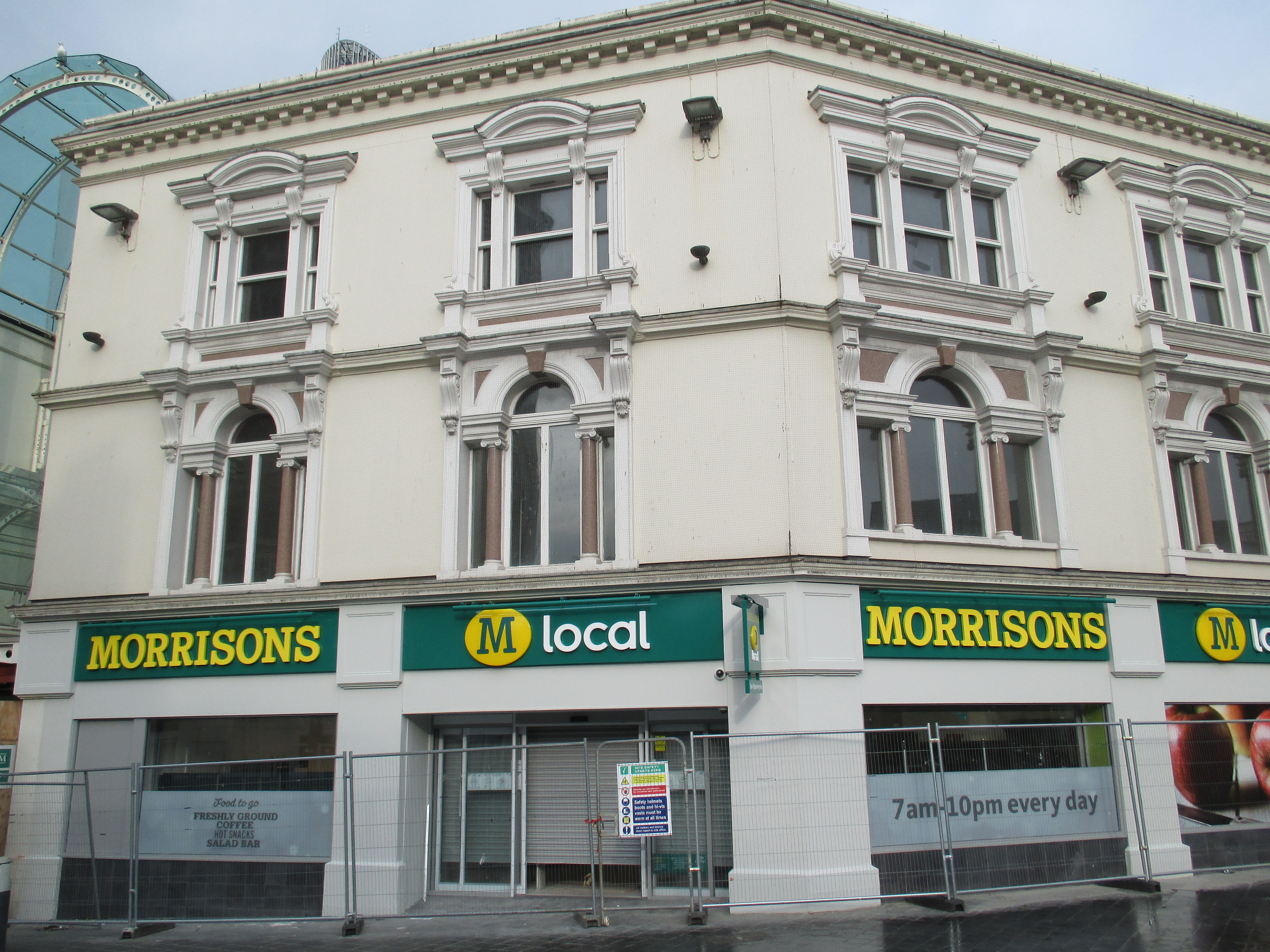
Morrisons M local, Church Street, Liverpool

The company operated a number of smaller stores called "Morrisons M Local" in major places such as Birmingham, Manchester, Cardiff and Bristol. These stores had a similar format to small Tesco Express and Sainsbury's Local stores, but included a wider range of ready-to-eat hot food such as pastries, coffee, rotisserie, porridge and also a salad bar. Items were supplied from nearby superstores and shoppers could also order foods, including fresh meat and fish.

A distribution centre in Feltham, West London was acquired to provide a distribution network to the stores in London and the South East where there are relatively few Morrisons superstores.

Around 70 stores were opened by the end of 2013, boosted by the purchase of 7 Jessops and 49 Blockbuster stores from administrators. On 26 February 2013, a further six HMV stores were acquired from administrators. The M Local chain was sold to a private equity group in 2015 and rebranded My Local, but entered administration itself less than a year later.

== Marketing and branding ==
=== Logos and slogans ===
The Morrisons logo, 1985 – March 2007

The Morrisons logo, March 2007 – June 2016

The Morrisons logo, 2015 – present.

On 15 March 2007, Morrisons unveiled what they proclaimed as a "more modern brand image", which was rolled out to all stores, vehicles and distribution sites. This kept the main 'Morrisons' signage and colour scheme, while replacing the familiar 'M' logo. The low price in-house brand, Bettabuy, was also changed to a 'more modern' brand called Morrisons Value, which was again rebranded to M Savers in January 2012. The change saw the replacement of the old yellow and black logo, with the 'More Reasons To Shop at Morrisons' strap line replaced with 'Fresh Choice For You'. In 2010 this was replaced by 'Eat Fresh. Pay Less'. This was later changed again in 2013 to 'More Of What Matters'. It also involved the replacement of external signage, with the previous Morrisons signs being retained alongside the new logo, as well as changes to product packaging, point of sale, advertising, staff uniforms (replacing the old blue ties and bows with green ones) and distribution vehicles. The rationale behind the decision was the need for Morrisons to attract a wider national customer base, capitalising on its expanded geographical spread following the acquisition of Safeway.

In 2015, Morrisons released a new logo and slogan 'Morrisons Makes It' to try and draw on the brand's heritage, with the new logo being installed on all store signs as well as new uniforms and new in-store looks.

In May 2023, Morrisons launched a new advertising campaign which saw the old 'More Reasons to Shop at Morrisons' slogan and jingle being revived.

=== Loyalty card ===
The Match & More card, introduced in 2014, price matched the chain's customers' comparable grocery shopping in store and online with Aldi, Lidl, Tesco, Sainsbury's and Asda. If a customer spent £15 or more and could have paid less for their comparable groceries, Morrisons automatically gave them the difference in points on their card at the checkout. For 1p difference in the cost of shopping, customers got 10 Match points—and for £1 difference they got 1,000 points. The difference was calculated at the checkout on national brands and comparable own label products and fresh food, even those that are on promotion elsewhere.

In 2016 the Match & More loyalty cards were rebranded as the "More" loyalty card and all customers were issued a new card in line with the rebranding. The loyalty scheme was rebranded once again in May 2021 as "My Morrisons", in line with the company dropping the points collection feature. The Morrisons More loyalty scheme was reintroduced on 22 May 2023, replacing My Morrisons. This changed their loyalty card format to the original Match & More scheme announced in 2014.

=== Product ranges ===
Morrisons stocks thousands of lines sold under their own brands. These include Morrisons Savers, formerly M Savers, an economy brand including items ranging from food and drink to toiletries, in 2015 the UK's fastest-growing grocery brand.

=== Tommy's Afternoon Tea Box ===
Morrisons launched a special 'Tommy's Afternoon Tea Box' to support shoppers wishing to mark the end of World War Two anniversary on 2 September 2020. The boxes benefitted the Tommy Tea initiative through the Royal British Legion Industries (RBLI), with £1 on every box heading to the charity, as well as an additional £10,000 provided by the company.

== Distribution ==
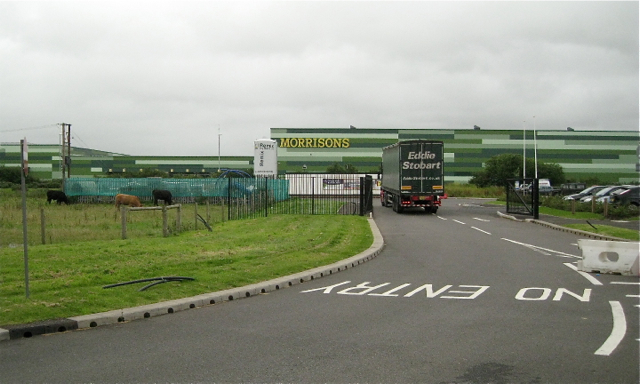
Morrisons distribution centre, Bridgwater, Somerset

In 2005, Morrisons purchased part of the collapsed Rathbones Bakeries, which supplied Morrisons bread, for £15.5 million.

In 2007, Morrisons opened a new Distribution Centre in Swindon and announced that it had bought a new site on Junction 23 of the M5 in Bridgwater in Somerset, for redevelopment as a fresh produce packing facility.

In 2011, Morrisons opened a new 767,500 sq/foot distribution centre in Bridgwater as part of the £11 million redevelopment project. This project also created 1,200 new jobs. Following the opening of the new distribution centre the Swindon depot was no longer required, and it was closed in December 2011.

Morrisons publishes detailed standards for their agricultural supply chain, including species specific welfare considerations. In 2025, Morrisons committed to new shrimp welfare standards by 2027 in cooperation with its suppliers.

== See also ==
- List of supermarket chains in the United Kingdom
- McColl's
- Mainstop
