= Ultracargo =

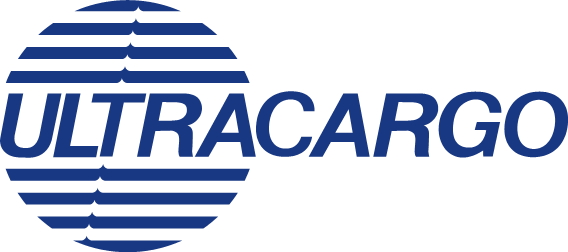
- Founded: 1966
- Headquarters: São Paulo, Brazil
- Revenue: R$ 346,5 milhões (2015)
- Owner: Ultrapar
- Number of employees: 613
- Website: www.ultracargo.com.br

Ultracargo is Brazil's largest bulk liquids storage company, primarily operating in the storage of chemicals, petrochemicals, biofuel, and vegetable oil. Ultracargo operates under the Ultra group along with Ipiranga, Ultragaz, Oxiteno and Extrafarma.

Ultracargo is the only operator in its sector with a presence in all major ports of Brazil. It has facilities in the Port of Santos, Port of Rio de Janeiro, Port of Paranaguá; Port of Aratu in Bahia; Porto do Itaqui in São Luís, Maranhão and Suape Port in Pernambuco. Additionally, they have terminals in Paulínia, state of São Paulo.

== History ==
The company began in 1966 as Transultra, which operated in both road transport and chemical storage. In 1978, Tequimar Chemical Terminal was founded in the Port of Aratu. When Transultra and Tequimar eventually merged into one logistics operation, it was rebranded as Ultracargo.

In 1986, Ultracargo began the construction of a 45,000 m² storage unit at the Suape Terminal in Pernambuco. It is their second oldest unit. Their terminal in Paulinia began operations in 1999. In July 2005, Ultracargo opened their second intermodal terminal in the Port of Santos. It integrates road, rail and sea transport. By then, it had a storage capacity of 33,500 m³ for chemical, 40,000 m³ for alcohol, and 38,000 m³ for vegetable oils.

In 2008, Ultrapar (through Ultracargo) announced the purchase of company União Terminais, which was previously owned by Unipar Carbocloro. The acquisition of União Terminais doubled the size of Ultracargo, making it the largest storage company for liquid bulk in Brazil and enhancing its range of operations. With this acquisition, Ultracargo increased its presence in the Port of Santos, the main port in Brazil, and positioned them strategically in the ports of Rio de Janeiro and Paranaguá.

In December 2009, Ultra (through Ultracargo) acquired a terminal with an 83,000 m³ capacity for storage in the port of Suape, Pernambuco. In September 2011, the company increased the Suape terminal’s storage capacity by 26,000 m³.

In March 2010, Ultra sold Ultracargo's operations in in-house logistics, solid bulk storage, and road transportation. This allowed Ultracargo to focus exclusively on bulk liquid storage. The same year, the company initiated plans to increase the storage capacity in all of its facilities. To date, Ultracargo has completed expansions in the ports of Santos and Aratu.

In July 2012, Ultracargo acquired Noble Group Limited's port terminal in Itaqui, increasing its capacity by 55,000 m³. The acquisition was also notable due to the strategic position of the port, which has access to railways that supply fuel to the states of Maranhão, Piauí and Tocantins. Fuel consumption in these states is higher than the national average and the acquisition marked the entry of Ultracargo in this market.

In April 2015, a fire hit six tanks containing fuel at the end of the Ultracargo terminal in the Port of Santos. It took eight days to put out the fire, but there were no casualties.

== Regions and ports ==
- Port of Santos, São Paulo
- Port of Suape, Pernambuco
- Port of Rio de Janeiro, Rio de Janeiro
- Port of Paraná, Paranaguá
- Porto do Itaqui, São Luís, Maranhão
- Port of Aratu, Bahia
- Paulínia, state of São Paulo (net terminal)
