= Pery Igel =

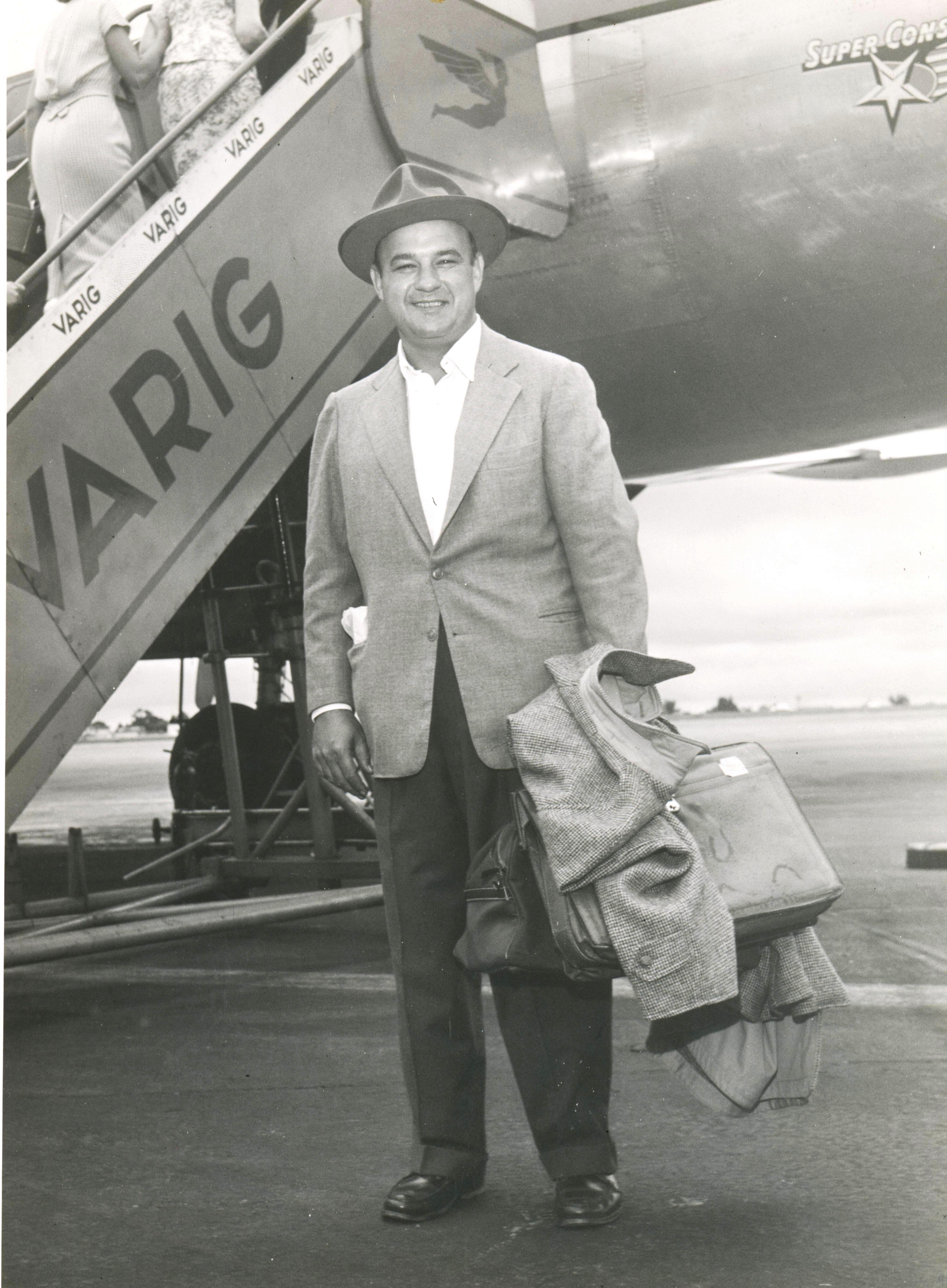
- Born: November 27, 1921
- Died: September 24, 1998 (aged 76)
- Occupations: Businessman, second president of Ultrapar
- Father: Ernesto Igel
- Relatives: Daisy Igel (sister)

Pery Igel (November 27, 1921 – September 24, 1998) was a Brazilian businessman. Igel was Ultra's second president, succeeding his father and company founder, Ernesto Igel.

== Biography ==
Igel was the administrator and second president of Ultra. He took over the company created by his father, Ernesto Igel, in 1959. After two years as president, Igel moved the headquarters from Rio de Janeiro to São Paulo, Brazil. Under Pery's administration, Oxiteno and Ultracargo were founded, two of the five divisions of Ultra, along with Ultragaz (first division of Ultra), as well as Ipiranga and Extrafarma, which were incorporated into the group in 2007 and 2014 respectively.

Under his administration, the company created and also dissociated a number of other activities that had stopped being related to Ultra's long-term strategy, such as a domestic appliances retailer (Ultralar), an engineering company (Ultratec), a frozen food organization (Supergel,) and the fertilizer industry (Ultrafértil).

Igel stepped down as CEO in 1981 and appointed vice president Paulo Cunha to the position. Igel became president of Ultra's board of directors and remained its main shareholder.

Before his death in September 1998, Igel transferred the controlling shares of Ultra to his family and to a small group of Ultra executives through the creation of a holding company.
