= Igel (surname) =

Igel is a surname. Notable people with the surname include:

- Daisy Igel (born 1926/1927), Brazilian architect and billionaire heiress
- Ernesto Igel (1893–1966), Austrian businessman
- Fritz Igel (1898-unknown), Austrian chess player and writer
- Nick Igel (born 1972), American soccer player
- Pery Igel (1921–1998), Brazilian businessman
- Stacy Igel, American fashion designer
- Wolf von Igel (1888–?), alleged spy for Germany during WWI
