= Paulo Cunha (businessman) =

Brazilian executive and businessman

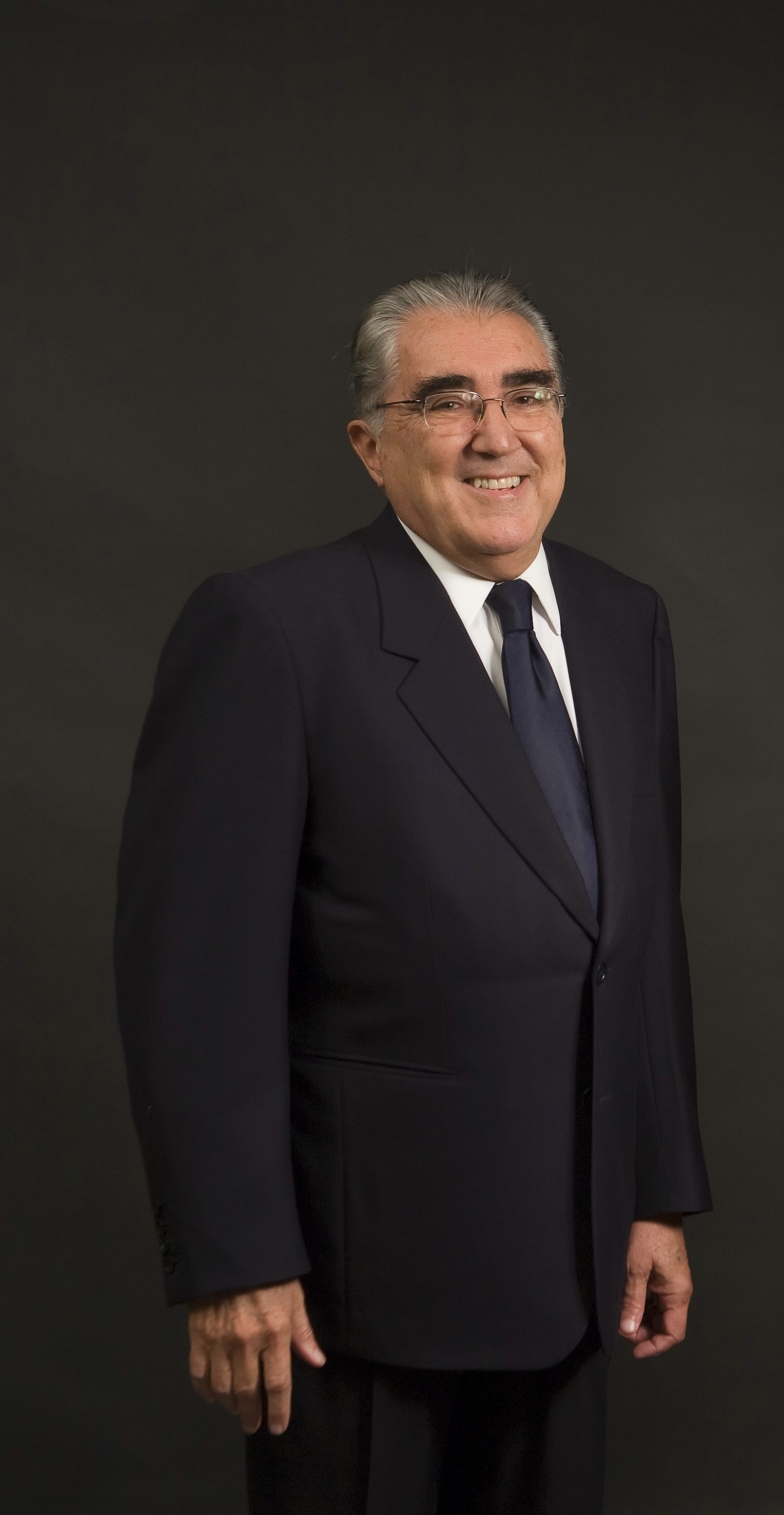
- Born: March 1, 1940 (age 86); Rio de Janeiro
- Occupations: President of Administrative Council, Ultra

Paulo Guilherme Aguiar Cunha is a Brazilian executive and businessman. He is the chairman of the board of directors of Ultra. He is known to have a strong nationalist profile, being a reference in the debate about the Brazilian industrial development and has often been asked to take over economy ministries.

Ultra is the fourth largest company in Brazil, with net incomes of R$60.9 billion in 2013, according to the annual report Valor 1000.

He was a member of the National Monetary Council, the board of directors of BNDESPar, the Advisory Council of the Brazilian Chemical Industry Association (Abiquim), president of the Brazilian Association of Technical Standards (ABNT), and the Brazilian Petroleum Institute (IBP). He is also one of the founders of the Institute of Studies for Industrial Development (Iedi).

== Early life and education ==
Cunha was born in Rio de Janeiro, Brazil, on March 1, 1940, the son of a military father and schoolteacher mother. He graduated with degrees in mechanical and industrial engineering from the Pontifical Catholic University of Rio de Janeiro (PUC-RJ). He began his professional life at Petrobras in the early 1960s.

== Career ==
In 1967, Cunha began working at Ultra, by invitation of Pery Igel, who was the president of the company. He later worked with Ultrafértil, Ultra's fertilizer development division, and was one of the founders of Petroquímica União. He was also the head manager of Oxiteno, the largest manufacturer of ethanol oxide and derivatives in Latin America.

In 1973, Cunha became vice president of Ultra. In 1981, he was named president of the company.

In 1998, Cunha was invited and declined the invitation to be the Minister of Development in Brazil, during Fernando Henrique Cardoso's government. Cunha led Ultra's IPO in 1999 and began a series of acquisitions that consolidated Ultragaz's leadership in the Brazilian LP gas market. He initiated Oxiteno's international expansion, which led the company to the leading position in the Latin American market.

In 2001, Cunha was nominated one of the Top 20 best executives of Brazil, by the national newspaper Jornal Valor Econômico.

In 2007, he stepped down as president and retained the position of chairman of the board of directors.

The company is among the top 500 worldwide, according to a Fortune magazine ranking published in 2014. The company's shares are traded under the name Ultrapar on the stock exchange market of São Paulo (BM&F Bovespa) and New York (NYSE).

Ultra operates in five segments: Ipiranga distribution of liquid fuels, Ultragaz LP gas distribution, Extrafarma retail pharmacy chain, Ultracargo storage of liquid bulk, and Oxiteno chemicals.
