= Paulo Cunha =

Paulo Cunha may refer to:

- Paulo Cunha (businessman) (born 1940), Brazilian executive and businessman
- Paulo Cunha (politician) (born 1971), Portuguese lawyer and politician
- Paulo Cunha (basketball) (born 1980), Portuguese basketball player
- Paulo Cunha (footballer) (born 1986), Portuguese football player
