= Solvay Indupa =

Solvay Indupa S.A.I.C.

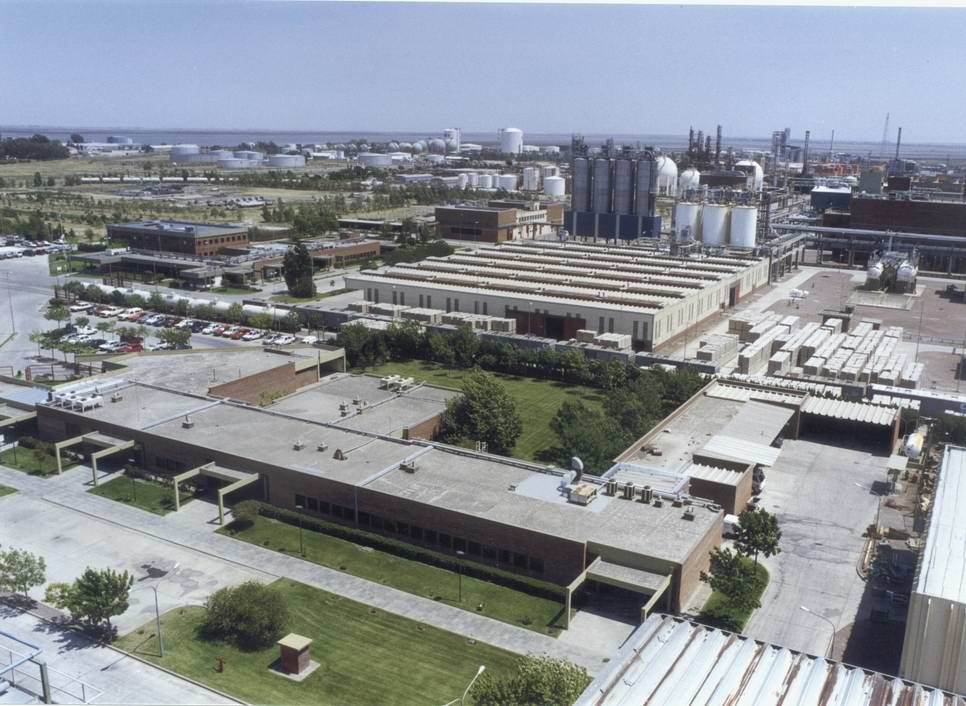
- Solvay Indupa's Bahía Blanca facility
- Company type: Subsidiary
- Traded as: BCBA: INDU
- Industry: Petrochemical
- Founded: 1948
- Headquarters: Buenos Aires, Argentina
- Key people: Paulo Francisco Trevia Schirch, (Chairman & CEO)
- Products: PVC, Caustic soda, Chlorine, Sodium hypochlorite
- Revenue: ▼US$ 654.9 million (2012)
- Net income: ▼ - US$ 22.1 million (2012)
- Number of employees: 392
- Parent: Unipar Carbocloro
- Website: www.solvayindupa.com

Solvay Indupa is an Argentine petrochemical company formerly owned by Solvay. It was considering selling this business to Braskem, but the project was rejected by the Brazilian competition authority. Solvay Indupa is one of the largest petrochemical companies in Latin America. The company is headquartered in Buenos Aires and has a Brazilian office located in São Paulo.

Since December 2016, it is owned by Unipar Carbocloro.

== History ==
Indupa (Indústrias Patagonicas) was established in Río Negro Province (Argentina) on September 16, 1948, and became a leading local producer of chlorine, Polyvinyl chloride resins (PVC), and caustic soda. It relocated operations to the petrochemical center in Bahía Blanca in 1986; but an economic crisis in subsequent years forced it into government receivership in 1993. Re-privatized in 1995 to a consortium led by Dow Chemical, Indupa was acquired in 1996 by Brussels-based Solvay, which owns a 51% stake. The company, in turn, acquired Solvay do Brasil and its Santo André facility (opened in 1941) in 1998.

In 2013 Solvay accepted to sell Solvay Indupa for Brazilian giant petrochemical company Braskem, the largest petrochemical company in Latin America, but this sale was refused by the Brazilian competition authority. In 2016, Unipar Carbocloro purchased 70.59% of the company, while committing to a Public takeover bid on the remainder of the stock.

== Dioxin Contamination ==
In 1998 Indupa Solvay was involved in a European dioxin crisis as it delivered highly contaminated (20-100 times higher than normal) lime milk for the use in Brazilian citrus pulp pellets. These pellets were distributed as feed for European cattle farms. The contamination was discovered by a German monitoring program that found dioxin trends increasing in butter, milk and meat samples starting in February 1998.

Moreover, recent studies have shown that the landfill and downstream area at the Indupa Solvay plant are still highly contaminated and have most probably affected the sediments and the flood plains of the Rio Grande (Paraná River) area.
