= Quattor (company) =

Brazilian petrochemical company

- Company type: Private
- Industry: Petrochemical
- Founded: 2008
- Defunct: 2009
- Headquarters: Rio de Janeiro, Brazil
- Revenue: ▲R$ 9.0 billion (2008)
- Number of employees: 2,000
- Website: www.quattor.com.br

Quattor was a Brazilian petrochemical company headquartered in Rio de Janeiro. Founded on June 12, 2008, Quattor was the second largest petrochemicals in Brazil, behind only the Braskem and one of the largest petrochemical of the Americas. In 2009 the company was incorporated by Braskem, the largest Brazilian petrochemical and one of the largest in the world.

Quattor was result of the union of assets UNIPAR(60%) and Petrobras(40%), and now the set of five companies, Quattor Participações SA, Quattor Basic Chemicals SA (ex-Union Petrochemical SA), SA Quattor Petroquímica (formerly Suzano Petroquímica SA), Polyethylenes Union SA and Rio Polímeros SA.

The company had 11 production units located in three Brazilian states: Rio de Janeiro, São Paulo and Bahia, in addition to the support office in São Paulo. It also had laboratories Quality and Development Centers, which assist in the development and improvement of its products. All this facilities have been transferred to Braskem.
