= Ernesto Igel =

Austrian entrepreneur (1893–1966)

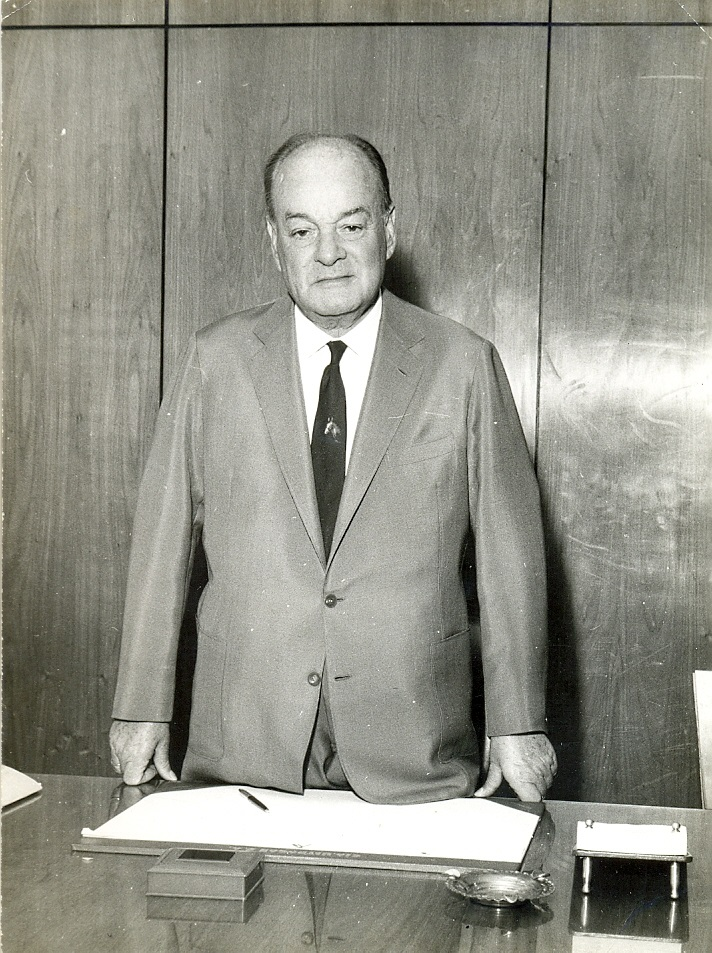
- Born: 27 November 1893; Vienna, Austria
- Died: 24 January 1966 (aged 72)
- Occupation: Businessman
- Known for: Founder of Ultragaz
- Spouse: Margaret Hartman
- Children: Pery Igel; Daisy Igel

Ernesto Igel (27 November 1893 – 24 January 1966) was an Austrian entrepreneur and founder of the company Empresa Brasileira de Gáz a Domilicio Ltda, the first Brazilian gas distribution network of fuel for cooking equipment (LPG).

In 1938, the company changed its name to Ultragaz S.A.

Through Ultragaz's growth and the creation of new companies, Ernesto Igel founded Ultra, also known as Ultrapar.

== Early life ==
Born to a family of merchants in Vienna, Austria, Igel was the eldest of five children. At 15, he got his first job at an import-export company. At 21, he was drafted to the Austrian army to fight in World War I. He was sent to Romania, where he served as a management assistant.

== Career ==
After the war, Igel moved to Brazil in 1920, when he was 26 years old. He then established the company Ernesto Igel & Cia., an importer of tableware, sanitary metals, stoves and heaters for use with pipeline gas. During his trips to Europe, Igel got to work with the then-new gas bottling technology for domestic use.

On 30 August 1937, Igel founded Empresa Brasileira de Gás a Domicílio Ltda. The following year, in September 1938, the company's IPO set the start of Ultragaz S.A. After that, the company extended its operations and began to conduct business throughout Brazil.

== Personal life ==
Igel married Margaret Hartman, also Austrian, with whom he had two children, Pery and Daisy Igel. The businessman headed the administration of their companies until 1959, when he named his son Pery as the new head of Ultragaz.
