= Daisy Igel =

Brazilian architect (died 2019)

- Born: Daisy Ruth Igel; 1927; Rio de Janeiro, Brazil
- Died: 2019 (aged 91–92)
- Occupation: Architect
- Spouse: Divorced
- Children: 3

Daisy Igel (1927–2019) was a Brazilian architect and billionaire heiress. She studied architecture at the School of Design—Illinois Institute of Technology (IIT), in Chicago. She was a professor at the School of Industrial Design of the State University of Rio de Janeiro, from 1969 to 1970. She also gave courses at the Museum of Modern Art in Rio de Janeiro.

Daisy Igel was the daughter of Ernesto Igel, the founder of Ultrapar.

Igel was divorced, with three children, and lived in Rio de Janeiro.

Igel died in 2019.
