= Stacy Igel =

American fashion designer

Stacy Morgenstern Igel is an American fashion designer, author, founder and creative director of the fashion line Boy Meets Girl.

== Early life ==
Igel was born in Chicago. She attended the University of Wisconsin-Madison, where she majored in retailing, with concentrations in design and merchandising, and secured a certificate in business.

== Personal life ==
Igel, born as Stacy Morgenstern, is of Jewish heritage. She is married to Brian Igel. On October 4, 2014, Igel gave birth to her first child Dylan Reid Igel. Igel currently resides in New York City.

== Career ==
Igel held internships with several designers, including Zandra Rhodes and Donna Karan, as well as on-air icon, Elsa Klensch. Igel then secured a position at IZOD, and then Elie Tahari.

In 2001, Igel launched her brand “Deesh” which featured boy/girl silhouettes. In 2006, Igel officially dropped the brand name Deesh and marketed her brand exclusively as Boy Meets Girl.

In 2010, Igel partnered with The Moret Group and launched the first Boy Meets Girl New York Fashion Week (NYFW) show, titled “Intrepid Traveler”, featuring a musical performance from The Neon Trees.

In 2015, Igel purchased the Boy Meets Girl brand and company under private ownership. The brand, Boy Meets Girl (BMG), has been worn by celebrities including Rosario Dawson, Rachel Bilson, Nina Dobrev, and Kendall Jenner. The Boy Meets Girl brand’s boy and girl silhouette logo has been featured in publications including InStyle, Teen Vogue, Lucky, Seventeen, Women’s Wear Daily, and The New York Times. The brand is currently sold at Nordstrom.

In March 2023, Igel became a published author when her first book, Embracing the Calm in the Chaos, was published.

== Charity ==
Igel is involved with the Young Survival Coalition (YSC), a charity that focuses on helping young woman who are diagnosed with and have survived breast cancer. Starting in 2008, Stacy Igel, on behalf of Boy Meets Girl, sponsored and co-chaired the Young Survival Coalition’s (YSC) annual In Living Pink Gala to raise money for breast cancer research. Igel collaborated with Urban Outfitters in 2009 to create Boy Meets Girl x YSC clothing and accessory products that have raised over $20,000 for the YSC.

In addition, since 2009 Igel, on behalf of Boy Meets Girl has worked with the BullyBust Campaign, on behalf of the National School Climate Center (NSCC), to raise awareness to help stop bullying in schools nationwide. Igel partnered with teen celebrity, Sammi Hanratty, to educate teens on how to stand up to bullying. Igel created a Boy Meets Girl t-shirt, which sold exclusively at Bloomingdales, to raise money for the anti-bullying movement. Igel has sponsored various BullyBust events, including the annual fundraising gala, to continue help raise awareness.
