= Paulo Cunha (footballer) =

Portuguese footballer

Personal information
- Full name: Paulo André Vilaça Cunha
- Date of birth: 19 February 1986 (age 40)
- Place of birth: Vila Nova de Famalicão, Portugal
- Height: 1.91 m (6 ft 3 in)
- Position: Goalkeeper

Team information
- Current team: Varzim
- Number: 1

Youth career
- 2002–2004: Braga
- 2004–2005: Rio Ave

Senior career*
Years	Team	Apps	(Gls)
2005–2006	Mirandela		
2006–2008	Valenciano		
2008–2010	Marinhas		
2010–2013	Vianense		
2013	Ribeirão	4	(0)
2014	Vianense	6	(0)
2014–2015	Tirsense	38	(0)
2016	Varzim B	14	(0)
2016–	Varzim	4	(0)
- * Club domestic league appearances and goals as of 26 March 2017

Paulo André Vilaça Cunha (born 19 February 1986) is a Portuguese football player who plays for Varzim.

== Club career ==
He made his professional debut in the Segunda Liga for Varzim on 21 September 2016 in a game against Olhanense.
