= Braskem =

Brazilian Petrochemical Corporation

Braskem S.A
- Type: Public
- Traded as: B3: BRKM3, BRKM5; BMAD: XBRK; NYSE: BAK; Ibovespa Component
- Industry: Petrochemical
- Founded: August 16, 2002; 24 years ago
- Headquarters: São Paulo, São Paulo, Brazil
- Area served: Brazil, United States, Argentina, Mexico, Europe
- Key people: Roberto Prisco Ramos (CEO)
- Products: Petrochemical, chemicals and resins
- Revenue: ▲US$ 14.7 billion (2017)
- Net income: ▲US$ 1.7 billion (2017)
- Owner: Odebrecht (38.25%); Petrobras (32.15%)
- Number of employees: 7,656
- Website: braskem.com

Braskem S.A is a Brazilian petrochemical company headquartered in São Paulo. The company is the largest petrochemical company in Latin America and has become a major player in the international petrochemical market (8th largest resin producer worldwide).

== Products ==
Braskem is the Americas’ top thermoplastic resin producer. With 36 industrial plants spread across Brazil, United States, Mexico and Germany, the company produces over 16 million tons of thermoplastic resins and other petrochemicals per year. Braskem is the world’s leading biopolymers producer with its 200,000 tons Green PE plant that produces polyethylene from sugarcane-based ethanol.

=== Basic petrochemicals ===
Braskem controls the three largest petrochemical complexes in Brazil, located in the cities of Camaçari, Bahia, Mauá, São Paulo and Triunfo, Rio Grande do Sul. Besides these three petrochemical complexes, Braskem also controls a complex in Duque de Caxias, Rio de Janeiro, which is based on gas rather than naphtha. Its basic petrochemical units account for the supply of ethylene and propylene to the company's nearby polymer units. The company also produces other chemical products such as benzene, butadiene, toluene, xylene and isoprene. These compounds are mostly sold to other chemical companies based within the same complexes, such as Innova S.A., Elekeiroz and Dow Chemical.

Although its main feedstock is naphtha, Braskem's green ethylene plant was inaugurated in September, 2010. This green ethylene plant is an important step forward in the strategy of becoming a global leader in sustainable chemicals. The plant is the largest industrial-scale operation in the world producing ethylene made from 100% renewable raw materials, i.e., sugar-cane. The project was conceived and installed in less than two years based on Braskem’s proprietary technology.

Located at the Triunfo petrochemical complex in the state of Rio Grande do Sul, the plant produces 200,000 tons of green ethylene, which will be transformed into an equivalent volume of green plastic.

=== Polymers ===
Braskem is Brazil's main producer of polyethylene, polypropylene and polyvinyl chloride – PVC, with 5.7 million tons of resins capacity production in Brazilian territory. The company is also the leader in the US polypropylene market, with 1.5 million tons of production capacity. In addition, its polypropylene capacity production in Germany is 545,000 tons.

Braskem is also implementing an integrated petrochemical complex in Mexico. The complex will consist of a cracker using ethane as feedstock, and three integrated polyethylene plants with a combined annual capacity of 1.05 million tons. The complex will begin production by mid-2015. Developed through a joint venture with the Mexican group Idesa, the project will increase the share of gas in the company’s feedstock matrix, improving its competitiveness.

== History ==
Braskem was formed in 2002, already Latin America's leading petrochemical company, with industrial units and offices in Brazil, as well as commercial bases in the United States and Argentina. The company was formed by the consolidation of six companies: Copene, OPP, Trikem, Nitrocarbono, Proppet and Polialden. In 2006, Braskem acquired Politeno, the third largest polyethylene producer in Brazil. The company joined Petrobras and Ultrapar the following year in the biggest merger in Brazilian history, when those three companies acquired Grupo Ipiranga for US$4 billion. While Petrobras and Ultrapar shared the fuel distribution operations, Braskem took over Ipiranga Petroquímica, Ipiranga's former petrochemical operation.

In 2016, Braskem was fined $957 million over a bribery scandal.

Braskem is responsible for the sinking process of parts of the city of Maceió, in the state of Alagoas. This event has gained national notoriety since its beginning in 2018 and has since caused the displacement of around 60,000 people in the city.

In August 2026, Braskem's Mexican unit filed for Chapter 11 bankruptcy protection amid facing worsening financial strains and a liquidity cash crunch.

== Braskem America ==
Braskem America is the leading producer of polypropylene in the United States, with five production plants located in Texas, Pennsylvania and West Virginia, and a Technology and Innovation Center in Pittsburgh. Headquartered in Philadelphia, Braskem America is a wholly owned subsidiary of Braskem S.A.

Braskem Europe is headquartered in Rotterdam, Netherlands with two plants in Schkopau and Wesseling. Braskem Europe is a wholly owned subsidiary of Braskem S.A.

== Purchases ==
On January 22, 2010, Braskem announced the acquisition of Quattor, in line with its strategy to strengthen the Brazilian petrochemical chain and become one of the five largest and most competitive petrochemical companies in the world. The acquisition of Quattor Participações S.A., Unipar Comercial e Distribuidora S.A., and Polibutenos S.A. Indústrias Químicas was unanimously and fully approved by the board of directors of the Administrative Council of Economic Defense (CADE) on February 23, 2011. On February 1, 2010, Braskem announced the acquisition of the PP assets of Sunoco Chemicals, 4th largest polypropylene producer in the U.S. The transaction represented an important step in Braskem’s international expansion process, offering the combination of growth in the U.S. market, with alternative sources of raw materials at competitive costs and access to major consumer markets. With this acquisition, Braskem has become the 3rd largest polypropylene player in the world.

On July 27, 2011, Braskem announced the acquisition of the polypropylene business (PP) of Dow Chemical. The transaction involved 4 industrial units, 2 plants in the United States and 2 plants in Germany. The U.S. assets, located in Freeport, Texas and Seadrift, Texas, have combined production capacity of 505 kton, which represents 50% of the country’s annual PP production of 1,425 kton. The German assets, located in the cities of Wesseling and Schkopau, have combined annual production capacity of 545 kton. On September 30, 2011, the acquisition was approved by the antitrust agencies of the United States, the Federal Trade Commission and the Antitrust Division of the U.S. Department of Justice, as well as the European Union. The transaction made the company the largest PP producer in the United States.

In 2012, the company commissioned a new PVC plant with annual production capacity of 200 kton in the state of Alagoas. Braskem also expanded its production of butadiene, a key input used by the rubber industry, at its plant located in the state of Rio Grande do Sul, which increased its annual production capacity of this product by 100 kton; in line with its strategy of adding value to the existing chains.

In 2014, the company completed its investment in the expansion and conversion of one of its polyethylene production lines in Bahia to produce metallocene-based LLDPE. This resin, of more modern technology, will supply the plastic film industry.
