= Unipar Carbocloro =

Brazilian chemical company

Unipar Carbocloro S/A
- Type: Sociedade Anônima
- Traded as: B3: UNIP3, UNIP5, UNIP6
- Industry: Chemicals
- Founded: 1969
- Headquarters: São Paulo, Brazil
- Area served: Brazil
- Key people: Frank Geyer Abubakir, (CEO)
- Products: Petrochemical
- Revenue: ▲US$ 926.3 million (2017)
- Net income: ▲US$ 92.8 million (2017)
- Number of employees: 2800
- Website: www.uniparcarbocloro.com.br

Unipar Carbocloro is a publicly traded Brazilian chemical company based in São Paulo and chaired by Frank Geyer Abubakir.

== History ==
Founded in 1969 as União Participações Industriais Ltda., the company is the owner of an industrial complex for the production of chemicals, polyolefins and other oil derivatives, and was a pioneer in the installation of petrochemical complex of São Paulo.

After a consolidation process in the 1980s and 1990s, the company changed its name to Unipar - União de Indústrias Petroquímicas S/A and began a period of expansion from the early 2000s with the incorporation of new company Rio Polímeros and capacity increases at Petroquímica União and Polietilenos União subsidiaries.

In 2008 the company consolidated its assets in southeastern Brazil in the Quattor Participações holding and in 2010 the company was sold to Braskem and Petrobras. Thus, Braskem became the largest petrochemical company in Latin America.

Unipar maintained its investment in other businesses and in 2013 acquired the remaining shares of Carbocloro company from the Occidental Petroleum Corporation. The result was the creation of Unipar Carbocloro S/A, a publicly traded company that used to have minority shareholding capital of Tecsis Technology (but no longer own it) and Advanced Systems S/A. In its current shareholder structure, Unipar Carbocloro exists since May 2013 when the deal was approved by the Administrative Council for Economic Defense (CADE).

== Products ==
Unipar Carbocloro operates in the soda and chlorine industry.

Production capacity

Product	Production capacity
Chlorine	355,000 tons/year
Caustic Soda	400,000 tons/year
Dichloroethane	140,000 tons/year
Hydrochloric Acid	630,000 tons/year
Sodium Hypochlorite	400,000 tons/year

== Other activities ==
Unipar Carbocloro owns 25.17% of the company Tecsis Tecnologia e Sistemas Avançados S/A, a wind turbine manufacturer. In 2014 Tecsis planned to build a new plant in Camaçari, Bahia state.
