= Ultrapar =

Brazilian company

Ultra Group (Ultrapar Participações S.A)
- Type: Public
- Traded as: B3: UGPA3; NYSE: UGP; BMV: UGP
- Industry: Conglomerate
- Founded: 30 August 1937
- Founder: Ernesto Igel
- Headquarters: São Paulo, Brazil
- Key people: Marcos Lutz; Rodrigo Pizzinatto (CFO)
- Products: Biomethane; Fuels; LPG; Compressed Natural Gas; Energy; Logistics; Service stations Bulk-liquids
- Revenue: ▲US$26.5 billion (2025)
- Net income: ▲US$307.1 Million (2025)
- Number of employees: 9,778 direct 76.000 indirect
- Subsidiaries: Ipiranga; Ultragaz; Ultracargo
- Website: www.ultra.com.br

The Ultra Group is a Brazilian conglomerate operating in the industry segments of energy and logistics infrastructure through its subsidiaries Ipiranga, Ultragaz and Ultracargo. These subsidiaries are fully controlled by the holding company Ultrapar. The Group's shares are traded under the name Ultrapar on São Paulo (B3) and on New York (NYSE) stock exchanges.

Based on its financial statements, the Ultra Group, in 2022, was one of the 10 largest business groups in Brazil, with a net revenue of R$147 billion. Furthermore, the group was included in the Fortune magazine ranking of the 500 largest global business groups published for 2019 and in 7th position in the Value 1000 ranking of the largest Brazilian business groups.

== History ==
The origins of Ultrapar Participações SA (Ultra) date back to 1937 with the founding of the company “Empreza Brasileira de Gás a Domicílio” by Ernesto Igel. This was the first Brazilian company to bottle and distribute gas for domestic cooking. The company began operating with a fleet of three trucks and 166 customers, but soon expanded and gave rise to the founding of Ultragaz.

In December 1953. the organization further expanded its operations through both organic growth in Ultragaz and the creation of new companies. Two of the most important businesses resulting from this expansion process were Oxiteno, a pioneering company in the production of ethylene oxide and derivatives in Brazil, created in 1970; and Ultracargo, created from the merger of Transultra and Tequimar. Transultra was a road transport and storage company for chemical and petrochemical products, created in 1966, and Tequimar was a chemical handling terminal, in the port of Aratu (BA), which integrated its storage and logistic services in 1978.

In the past, the Ultra Group also operated in the market segments for the production of fertilizers, through Ultrafértil; retailing of domestic appliances, through Ultralar; industrial engineering, through Ultratec; and in the production and distribution of frozen foods, through Ultragel. However, the Ultra Group withdrew from these sectors in the 1970s to focus on those activities where it saw strong demand growth and opportunities for market leadership.

=== 1999 to 2010 ===
In October 1999, the holding company Ultrapar became a public company and its shares were launched simultaneously on the São Paulo and New York stock exchanges. At the time, it was the first Brazilian company to go public directly in New York. This initiative increased the Group's investment capacity, and enabled it to use its own shares to finance the acquisition of other companies. Following this capitalization, the Ultra Group began a process of expanding its activities in the following decade.

Four years later, in August 2003, Ultra acquired the LPG (bottled gas) distribution operations of Shell Gas which resulted in Ultragaz becoming the market leader in the Brazilian LPG distribution market. In October of the same year, the company began its international operations through Oxiteno’s acquisition of Canamex, the chemical division of the Mexican group Berci.

In 2005, Ultracargo began operating at the inter-modal terminal in the Port of Santos, increasing its market share in the Brazilian logistics segment.

Two years later, in 2007, Ultra acquired the Ipiranga Group’s fuel distribution network in the South and Southeast regions of Brazil, as well as the Ipiranga brand name. As a result, it became the second largest liquid fuel distribution company in Brazil, with a 15% market share.

In 2007, the Ultra Group acquired União Terminais, from União das Indústrias Petroquímicas (Unipar), and Ultracargo became the largest bulk-liquid storage operator in Brazil, with a 30% share of the total market capacity.

The following year, it concluded the acquisition of Texaco Brazil’s, fuel distribution operations increasing Ipiranga's share of the domestic market fuel sector to 23%.

=== 2010 to 2019 ===
In August 2010, Ultrapar's shares were listed in the New Market Segment of the BM&FBovespa stock exchange (now called B3). This stock market segment is composed entirely of companies with very high standards of corporate governance.

The following year, Ipiranga, in partnership with Odebrecht Transport, created ConectCar, a company that operates in the electronic payment segment for highway tolls, parking and fuel purchases.

In October 2013, the Ultra Group formed an association with Extrafarma, which at the time was the eighth largest pharmacy chain in Brazil. Extrafarma originated in the State of Pará and had a strong presence in other States of the North and Northeast Regions of Brazil. As a result of this association, the Ultra Group acquired 186 drugstores in the States of Pará, Amapá, Maranhão, Ceará and Piauí. The payment to the owners of Extrafarma, the Lazara family, was made in Ultrapar shares. The family now holds 2.9% of Ultrapar's share capital.

In June 2016, the Ultra group agreed to acquire the fuel distribution company AleSat for R$2.17 billion. This acquisition would have resulted in the Ultra Group becoming the second largest fuel distribution company in Brazil, with a 30% market share, second only to the market leader, BR Distribuidora. However, the operation was vetoed by the federal competition agency, CADE, in September 2017.

=== 2020 to present day ===
In March 2020, the Ultra Group launched its new brand identity during an event with shareholders, investors and financial analysts. The Group announced that this new brand better reflected its positioning of being an organization that is always looking to the future, that has a legacy of 86 years of history and has a strong presence in the Brazilian market and in eight other countries.

Ultrapar's shares were included in the B3 Efficient Carbon Index (ICO2 B3), which was created in 2010 with the aim of promoting a discussion on climate change in Brazil. This index is composed of the shares of companies that are committed to transparency in reporting their carbon emissions. Ultrapar also obtained a B score in the Climate Change dimension of the Carbon Disclosure Project (CDP), surpassing the D scores for both the regional average for South America, and the average for the oil and gas sector.

Also in 2020, the Group launched a new version of its payments app called abastece aí. This app, which was originally launched in 2016, provides discounts on the purchases of fuel and other products and services at Ipiranga's service stations, Jet Oil workshops and AmPm stores. The app was upgraded with new functionalities and it now provides a broad payment platform, including digital payment accounts for each customer, in addition to discounts and cashback for a growing network of retail partners. Following this, the abastece aí and Km de Vantagens operations were spun off from Ipiranga into a new independent company.

In May 2021, the Group sold its Extrafarma operations to the Pague Menos Group for R$700 million. Then, in August 2021, the group sold its chemical specialty operations subsidiary, Oxiteno, to the Thai-based group, Indorama Ventures.

The sales of Oxiteno and Extrafarma were finally completed in April and August 2022, respectively. These sales strengthened the Group's positioning and investment capacity in its core energy and infrastructure sectors, in addition to reinforcing its financial solidity.

Also in 2022, Ultragaz completed the acquisitions of Stella Energia and NEOgás, which marked its entry into the market segments for renewable electrical energy and compressed natural gas distribution, respectively.

In April 2023, Ultracargo acquired a 50% stake in Opla Logística Avançada from Copersucar. Opla was the largest independent ethanol terminal in Brazil and this acquisition marked Ultracargo's entry into the bulk-liquid storage and logistics segment, integrated inside port terminals, in line with its growth plan. The acquisition was completed in July of the same year.

In August 2023, CADE approved the formation of a consortium between Ultragaz and Supergasbras (SHV) for the shared operation of the bases of their LPG production structures dedicated to supplying bottled gas to households for cooking. This provided customers and resellers with a greater security of supply and improved service levels in the regions served, without any changes in either company's commercial operations.

== Market position ==
According to Sindigás, the union for distributors of LPG, in 2019, Ultragaz was the market leader in the distribution of LPG with a 23.25% share of the Brazilian market.

Ipiranga is the second largest fuel distributor in Brazil, with more than 6,500 service stations.

Ultracargo is the market leader in the sector of independent bulk-liquid storage terminals in Brazil. It is present in the country's main ports and owns and operates modern terminals for the storage and movement of a range of products. In total, its six terminals have a static storage capacity of 955 thousand m^{3}.
