= Oxiteno =

Brazilian chemical manufacturer

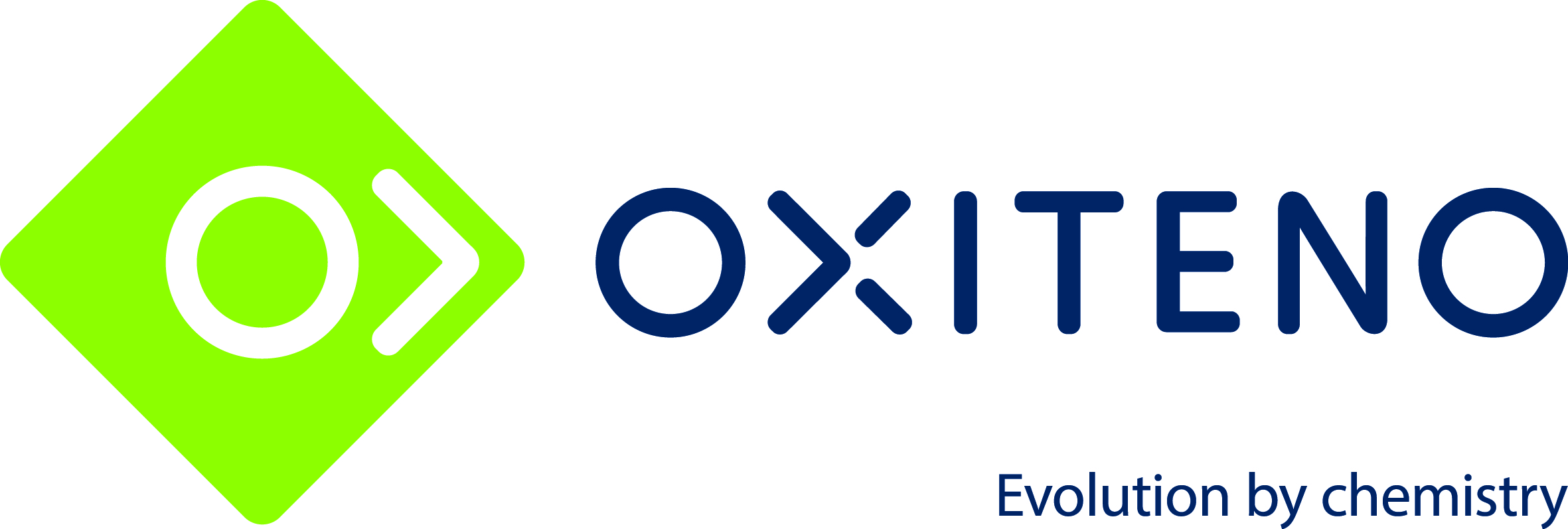
- Company type: Private
- Founded: 1970; 56 years ago
- Founder: Paulo Cunha
- Headquarters: São Paulo, Brazil
- Products: Chemical products
- Owner: Grupo Ultra (1970–2022); Indorama Ventures (2022–present)
- Website: www.oxiteno.com.br

Oxiteno is a Brazilian multinational manufacturer of surfactants and chemicals. The company develops and supplies raw materials to industries in over 30 sectors including cosmetics, personal care, household cleaning and industrial, agrochemicals, paints and varnishes.

Oxiteno operates in nine countries throughout the Americas, Europe, and Asia. It has three research and development centers, twelve industrial plants in Brazil, the United States, Mexico, Uruguay, and Venezuela, as well as commercial offices in Argentina, Belgium, China, and Colombia. According to research conducted by Info Exame magazine in partnership with ESPM, Oxiteno was appointed as the ninth most innovative company in Brazil in 2014.

On April 4, 2022, the company was acquired by Indorama Ventures.

== History ==
Founded in 1970 by Paulo Cunha, Oxiteno was the first company to produce ethylene oxide and derivatives in Brazil. Its first plant was installed at the Mauá Petrochemical Complex, in the outskirts of the metropolitan region of São Paulo, and the second was opened in 1974 in the Industrial Pole of Camaçari, in the Brazilian state of Bahia. Oxiteno created a research and development center in Mauá Petrochemical Complex in 1986, built a new plant in the South Petrochemical Pole of Brazil in the city of Triunfo, Rio Grande do Sul in 1989, and expanded its production capacity in the Camaçari Petrochemical Complex in 1997.

In July 2003, it started its international expansion through the purchase of the Mexican company Canamex. Oxiteno took over the company's two plants in Guadalajara and Coatzacoalcos.

In 2006, Ultra initiated an expansion plan of the ethylene oxide production capacity and other chemicals in Mauá and Camaçari plants. In August of the same year, it opened its first sales office abroad in Buenos Aires, Argentina.

In April 2007, Ultra, through its subsidiary Oxiteno Mexico, acquired the sulfated and sulfonated assets of Unión Química SA in San Juan del Río in México.

In September of that year, Ultra bought the Venezuelan Arch Química Andina, a subsidiary of US-based Arch Chemicals. The unit, located in Santa Rita, Venezuela, was renamed Oxiteno Andina and is the only producer of ethoxylates in the country.

In 2007, Oxiteno opened its first sales office in the United States.

In June 2008, Oxiteno opened an oleochemical plant, which became the first producer of fatty alcohols, fatty acids and glycerin in Latin America, in Camaçari, Bahia.

In April 2012, Oxiteno bought its first plant in the United States. It was a manufacturer of special chemicals, acquired from Pasadena Property, in Pasadena, Texas. The following month, Oxiteno bought American Chemical’s Uruguayan specialty chemicals company, in particular sulfonated surfactants and sulfated in Montevideo. The following year, in 2013, Oxiteno started a project to expand its research and development center to the oil and gas market. The research center is located in Mauá, São Paulo.

On August 30, 2021, it was announced that the Thai Indorama Ventures would acquire Oxiteno for US$ 1.3 billion. This was finished on April 4, 2022.

== Locations ==
=== Brazil ===
- Mauá Petrochemical Complex
- Camaçari Industrial Complex
- South Petrochemical Complex

=== International ===
- Guadalajara, Mexico
- Coatzacoalcos, Mexico
- Buenos Aires, Argentina
- San Juan del Río, Mexico
- Santa Rita, Venezuela
- Pasadena, Texas, USA
- Montevideo, Uruguay
- Colombia
- China
- Belgium
