= Ipiranga (company) =

Brazilian fuel company, subsidiary of Ultra

- Company type: Privately held company
- Industry: Filling station
- Founded: 1937
- Headquarters: Rio de Janeiro, Brazil
- Products: Petroleum and derived products service stations Ipiranga motor oil Petrochemical products Transportation
- Brands: ampm (Brazil) (1994–present); Jet Oil (1994–present); KM de Vantagens (2010–present); ConectCar (2012–present)
- Revenue: ▲US$ 15.0 billion (2015)
- Parent: Ultra
- Website: www.ipiranga.com.br

Ipiranga Produtos de Petróleo S.A, commonly shortened to Ipiranga (Portuguese pronunciation: [ipiˈɾɐ̃ɡɐ]), is a Brazilian fuel company headquartered in Rio de Janeiro, Brazil, and is a subsidiary of Ultra. It is the second-largest Brazilian fuel distribution company, and the largest in the private sector.

The company has about 6,500 gas stations across the country and 1,400 convenience stores. Ipiranga owns the Brazilian operations of the ampm chain of convenience stores, Jet Oil oil change services, Km de Vantagens loyalty program, and ConectCar prepaid system for electronic payment of tolls and parking.

== Etymology ==
Ipiranga combines the indigenous Tupi words ‘y (river) and pirang (red) to mean "red river".

== History ==
Destilaria Rio-Grandense de Petróleo S.A., the first Brazilian refinery, was founded in November 1934 by Brazilian and Argentinian investors in Uruguaiana, state of Rio Grande do Sul. The refinery produced full-scale gasoline, kerosene, diesel oil, and fuel oil. In August 1936, the owners of Destilaria Rio-Grandense de Petróleo partnered with a group of Uruguayan investors and created Ipiranga SA, a Brazilian oil company. The new company was headquartered in Rio Grande. On September 7, 1937, the Refinaria de Petróleo Riograndense was founded in the city of Uruguaiana. At the same time, Companhia Brasileira de Petróleo Ipiranga (Ipiranga Brazilian Oil Corporation) was founded under Destilaria Rio-Grandense de Petróleo S.A.

In 1938, Ipiranga opened its first gas station in Rio Grande (Rio Grande do Sul). In the same year, Brazil's President Getúlio Vargas signed a decree which nationalized the oil refining industry.

By the 1940s, Ipiranga produced solvents, asphalt, lubricants and insecticides in Brazil to counter import restrictions during World War II. Production stopped for the duration of the war. In 1953, the United States began operating units of thermal cracking, which allowed for the production of new fuels.

In 1957, Ipiranga split fuel distribution operations into two companies: Distribuidora de Produtos de Petróleo Ipiranga (DPPI, distribution of petroleum products) which covered the South Region in Brazil, and Companhia Brasileira de Petróleo Ipiranga (CBPI), which covered all other regions in the country. In May 1959, Ipiranga bought Gulf Oil Brazil, and expanded its operations to Brazil.

Ipiranga logo from 1996 to 2023

In 1993, Ipiranga bought the Atlantic service station network in Brazil and became one of the largest gas distribution companies in the country. According to the newspaper O Globo, the purchase of Atlantic was the largest private company acquisition in the country's history. Ipiranga acquired 11 am/pm franchise locations. In the following year, the company launched Jet Oil, an automotive and oil change service franchise.

Ipiranga’s Londrina facility earned its ISO 14001 — Environmental Management System certification in 1998. Ipiranga was the first fuel distribution company in Latin America to earn the certification. In 2006, Ipiranga started to offer biodiesel in its stations.

=== Ipiranga ===
In March 2007, Group Ipiranga was acquired by three companies: Ultra, Petrobras and Braskem. Ultra acquired the Ipiranga brand, its management team and its gas distribution chain in the South and Southeast regions of Brazil. The industrial operations and the rest of the fuel distribution network were transferred to Petrobras and Braskem. The acquisition made Ultra the second-largest gas distribution company in Brazil.

That same year, Ipiranga Zero Carbon Card was launched. A portion of all gas purchases on the credit card went to carbon neutrality programs, such as planting trees.

In 2008, Ultra bought Texaco's fuel distribution chain in Brazil. By then, Texaco had 1986 gas stations in the country. Ipiranga’s presence in Brazil expanded to the Central-West, North and Northeast regions, thus covering all the states of the country. As part of the acquisition, the gas stations were entitled to keep using the Texaco brand for five years; after that they would be converted into Ipiranga's brand. The acquisition brought Ultra's share of the Brazilian fuel distribution business to 23 percent. Also in 2008, Ipiranga launched Jet Oil Motos, a specialized franchise in oil change services for motorcycles.

Ipiranga opened the first eco-efficient station in Brazil, in Porto Alegre (Rio Grande do Sul), in 2009. The station was designed to increase the effectiveness of energy management, water, waste and materials.

In October 2010, Ultra acquired Distribuidora Nacional de Petróleo (DNP), expanding the volume of Ipiranga by 40% in the northern states of Amazonas, Rondônia, Roraima, Acre, Pará and Mato Grosso. The following year, Ipiranga launched a project to collect batteries and cell phones in approximately 30 Jet Oil stations in the city of Rio de Janeiro.

In November 2012, Ipiranga partnered with Odebrecht TransPort to create ConectCar, a company engaged in the electronic payment of tolls, parking and fuel. ConectCar began operations in April 2013 in São Paulo.

In 2014, Ipiranga was named best wholesale company by "Melhores e Maiores" of Exame magazine for the fourth consecutive year. That same year, am/pm, a franchise owned by Ipiranga, was voted the 11th-most-profitable franchise in Brazil by Exame magazine.

== Sponsorships ==
Ipiranga is the main sponsor of A.Mattheis Motorsport in the Stock Car Pro Series.
