= Ultragaz =

Brazilian petroleum distributor

- Company type: Private
- Industry: Gas distribution
- Founded: 1937
- Founder: Ernesto Igel
- Headquarters: São Paulo, SP, Brazil
- Key people: Tabajara Bertelli (CEO)
- Owner: Ultrapar
- Website: www.ultragaz.com.br

Ultragaz is a Brazilian liquefied petroleum gas (LPG) distribution company. It originated as part of the company Empresa Brasileira de Gás a Domicílio, created by Ernesto Igel, founder of Ultra Group.

Ultragaz is the largest LPG distributor in Brazil, with 46 percent market share. It provides gas to about 15 million households in the bottled LPG segment and more than 90,000 customers in bulk.

== History ==
Austrian entrepreneur Ernesto Igel moved to Brazil from Vienna in 1920, and founded Empresa Brasileira de Gás à Domicílio in 1937.

The company was the first in Brazil to distribute household gas. Empresa Brasileira de Gás a Domicílio started small with three delivery trucks and less than 200 customers. By the early 1960s, operating as Ultragaz, the company served a customer base of 1 million users. In 1997, Ultragaz introduced UltraSystem, the LPG bulk delivery system.

In 2003, Ultragaz acquired Shell's LPG distribution business in Brazil, Shell Gas. Ultragaz also introduced online and SMS order systems.

In October 2011, Ultragaz acquired the LPG distribution branch of the Spanish company Repsol in Brazil for R$50 million. and incorporated an annual sales volume of 22,000 tons, corresponding to 1% of the Brazilian market. Ultragaz has over 4,200 resellers.

On November 17, 2016, Petrobras closed the sale of Liquigás to Ultragaz for 2.8 billion reais. On February 28, 2018, CADE disapproved the purchase.

== Other names ==
In the State of Bahia, the company operates as Brasilgás.
