= List of oil refineries =

The Oil & Gas Journal publishes an annual worldwide oil refinery survey that provides plant-by-plant data, including refinery location, crude oil processing capacity, and major process unit capacities. The survey is widely used as an industry reference for refinery information and capacity data.

== Global summary ==
As per Energy Institute and OPEC data from 2024.

Global oil refining capacity by country (2024 estimates)
Country	Amount (million bpd)	Percentage of global capacity	Notes
China	18.48	17.8%	Overtook the U.S. as the world's largest refiner by capacity in 2023.
United States	18.43	17.7%	Maintains the highest actual throughput and complex secondary processing.
Russia	6.80	6.6%	Capacity largely focused on diesel exports; current runs impacted by sanctions.
India	5.80	5.6%	Fastest growing regional hub; operates the massive Jamnagar complex.
South Korea	3.50	3.4%	Highly integrated export-oriented coastal refineries.
Saudi Arabia	3.29	3.2%	Leading refiner in the Middle East, with significant joint ventures.
Japan	3.10	3.0%	Capacity consolidating due to declining domestic demand.

== World's largest refineries ==
No.	Refinery	Company	Location	Barrels per calendar day
1	Jamnagar Refinery	Reliance Industries Ltd.	India, Gujarat, Jamnagar	1,400,000
2	Paraguana Refinery Complex	PDVSA	Venezuela, Falcón, Punto Fijo	955,000
3	Ulsan Refinery	SK Energy	South Korea, Ulsan	840,000
4	Ruwais Refinery	Abu Dhabi National Oil Company (ADNOC)	UAE, Ruwais	817,000
5	Yeosu Refinery	GS Caltex	South Korea, Yeosu	730,000
6	Port Arthur Refinery	Saudi Aramco	United States, Texas, Port Arthur	730,000
7	Onsan Refinery	S-Oil	South Korea, Ulsan	669,000
8	Dangote Refinery	Dangote Group	Nigeria, Lekki	650,000
9	Galveston Bay Refinery	Marathon Petroleum	United States, Texas, Texas City	631,000
10	Beaumont Refinery	ExxonMobil	United States, Texas, Beaumont	630,000
11	Garyville Refinery	Marathon Petroleum	United States, Louisiana, Garyville	617,000
12	Al Zour Refinery	Kuwait Petroleum Corporation	Kuwait	615,000
13	Jurong Island Refinery	ExxonMobil	Singapore, Jurong Island	605,000
14	Daesan Refinery	Hyundai Oilbank	South Korea, Seosan	561,000
15	Baytown Refinery	ExxonMobil	United States, Texas, Baytown	560,640
16	Ras Tanura Refinery	Saudi Aramco	Saudi Arabia, Ras Tanura	550,000
17	Mailiao Refinery	Formosa Petrochemical	Taiwan, Mailiao	540,000
18	Baton Rouge Refinery	ExxonMobil	United States, Louisiana, Baton Rouge	522,500
19	Shell Pulau Bukom Refinery	Shell	Singapore, Bukom Island	500,000
20	Mina Al-Ahmadi Refinery	KNPC	Kuwait	466,000

== Africa ==
=== Algeria ===
- Skikda Refinery I (Sonatrach), 356,500 bbl/d (56,680 m^{3}/d) – built in 2009; processing capacity 16.5 million tonnes per year
- Skikda Condensate Refinery II (Sonatrach), 122,000 bbl/d (19,400 m^{3}/d) – start-up 1980; processing capacity around 5 million tonnes per year
- Adrar Refinery (PetroChina, CNPC/Sonatrach), 13,000 bbl/d (2,100 m^{3}/d) – built in 2007 (0.6 million tonnes/year)
- Sidi Rezine Refinery (Sonatrach), El Harrach, Algiers 77,000 bbl/d (12,200 m^{3}/d) – shutdown in 2018 for modernization, restarted in 2020; refining capacity 3.6545 million of tonnes per year
- Arzew Refinery (Sonatrach), 81,000 bbl/d (12,900 m^{3}/d) – start-up 1975; processing capacity of 780,000 tones of naphtha per year (3.75 million tonne/year)
- Hassi Messaoud Refinery (Sonatrach), 23,000 bbl/d (3,700 m^{3}/d) – Algerian government awarded engineering, procurement, and construction (EPC) contract to Técnicas Reunidas and Samsung Engineering January 2020; construction began February 2025; commissioning 2026–27; processing capacity 5 millions tonnes of crude oil per year
- Tiaret Refinery (Sonatrach), 100,000 bbl/d (16,000 m^{3}/d) – delayed from 2022 to 2025
- Biskar Refinery (Sonatrach SPA), 5 million tons of crude oil per year – in development as of 2017

=== Angola ===
- Luanda Refinery (Sonangol – opened 1958), 72,000 bbl/d (11,400 m^{3}/d)
- Cabinda Refinery (Gemcorp Capital), 60,000 bbl/d (9,500 m^{3}/d) – international tender 2017, under construction 2024–25; planned final capacity by the end of 2026
- Soyo Refinery (Quanten Consortium Angola), 100,000 bbl/d (16,000 m^{3}/d) – public tender for construction in 2019–20, contract awarded in early March 2021, in financing stage in 2025
- Lobito Refinery (Sonangol 30%/KBR 70%), Lobito, Benguela Province, 200,000 bbl/d (32,000 m^{3}/d) – in development as of August 2016 – November 2017, under construction in 2024–26
- Malongo Topping Plant (Cabinda Gulf Oil Company), 15,000 bbl/d (2,400 m^{3}/d) – operational as of 2024

=== Cameroon ===
- Limbé Refinery (Sonara – started in 1976), formerly 42,000 bbl/d (6,700 m^{3}/d) – fire broke out on May 31, 2019 following an explosion in the naphtha separation unit, damaging four of the thirteen production units and forcing a total suspension of operations; site being refurbished since 2021 and to open by late 2027
- Kribi Refinery, Lolabé 30,000 bbl/d (4,800 m^{3}/d) – to start partial operations in 2026

=== Chad ===
- Djarmaya Refinery (Societe d'Etude et d'Exploitation de la Raffinerie (SEERAT)), 20,000 bbl/d (3,200 m^{3}/d) – opened June 2011

=== Congo ===
- Pointe Noire Refinery (CORAF) 21,000 bbl/d (3,300 m^{3}/d)
- Fouta Refinery (Atlantic Petrochemical Refinery/Beijing Fortune Dingheng Investment/Sinopec), 110,000 bbl/d (17,000 m^{3}/d) – to be completed by 2025–26 (2.5 million tones of petroleum products per year)

=== Democratic Republic of the Congo ===
- Muanda Refinery (formerly SOCIR), formerly 15,000 bbl/d (2,400 m^{3}/d) – not in working order since 1998–2000

=== Egypt ===
- Amreya Refinery (Amreya Petroleum Refining Company (APRC)), Alexandria, 80,000 bbl/d (13,000 m^{3}/d) – operational 1972; 3–4 million tons of crude oil per year (around 15% of Egypt's total refining capacity in FY2019-20)
- Alexandria Refinery (Alexandria Petroleum Company), Alexandria, 100,000 bbl/d (16,000 m^{3}/d) – refined about 3.8 million tons of crude oil in fiscal year 2023/24, refined more than 3.5 million tons of crude oil in fiscal year 2024/25
- MIDOR (Middle East Oil Refinery), Ameriya Specialized Free Zone, Alexandria, 100,000 bbl/d (16,000 m^{3}/d) – established 1994; plans to expand by 60,000 bbl/d (9,500 m^{3}/d) by first quarter 2022
- Assiut Refinery (Assiut Oil Refining Company (ASORC)), 90,000 bbl/d (14,000 m^{3}/d) – built 1987
- Mostorod Refinery (Egypt Refining Company (ERC)), Cairo, 161,000 bbl/d (25,600 m^{3}/d) – financial closure of project (June 2012); construction began February 2014; began operating August 2019 – September 2020 with a processing capacity of 4.7 million tonnes per annum
- El-Nasr Refinery (El-Nasr Petroleum Company), Suez, 131,000 bbl/d (20,800 m^{3}/d)
- Suez Petroleum Refinery (Suez Petroleum Processing Company), El Suez, 60,000 bbl/d (9,500 m^{3}/d) – produced about 1.3 million tons in fiscal year 2023–24
- Tanta Refinery (Cairo Petroleum Refining Company), 40,000 bbl/d (6,400 m^{3}/d) – processes 1.2 million tons of crude oil per year
- Wadi Feran Refinery (EGPC), Janub Sina', 10,000 bbl/d (1,600 m^{3}/d)
- Ain Soukhna Refinery (Red Sea National Refining and Petrochemicals Company), 208,000 bbl/d (33,100 m^{3}/d) – signed agreement (April 2021) to build in Suez Canal Economic Zone, construction to be finished by 2024–28

=== Eritrea ===
- Assab Refinery, formerly 18,000 bbl/d (2,900 m^{3}/d) – built 1967; shut down August 1997

=== Ethiopia ===
- Gode Refinery (Golden Concord Group), 70,000 bbl/d (11,000 m^{3}/d) – started construction in late 2025, first phase to be completed within 24 months

=== Gabon ===
- Port Gentil Refinery I (Sogara/Total/Shell/Agip), Ogooue Maritime 21,000 bbl/d (3,300 m^{3}/d) NCI 8.3 – construction started 1965; operational 1967; routinely operates below capacity because of maintenance issues; temporarily shut down in August–September 2016 due to disputed presidential election of Ali Bongo and in 2017 for maintenance; annual processing capacity around 8.8 million barrels – went from processing 110 tonnes (806 barrels) per hour in September 1969 to 155 tonnes (1,136 barrels) per hour in 2016
- Port Gentil Refinery II (Gabon Oil Company/Samsung C&T), 60,000 bbl/d (9,500 m^{3}/d) – to be almost fully automated; being developed as of 2019

=== Ghana ===
- Tema Oil Refinery Limited (TOR – Ghana Government), 45,000 bbl/d (7,200 m^{3}/d) – incorporation & construction 1960–63 and was originally owned 100% by ENI Group, then purchased (Ghanaian Italian Petroleum Company) by Ghana in April 1977; changed to current name in 1990–91; shutdown for six years (2017–25) after fire – three-month Turnaround Maintenance program August–October 2025; resumed operation December 2025
- Sentuo Oil Refinery Limited (SORL), Tema Industrial Zone, 100,000 bbl/d (16,000 m^{3}/d) – conceived from Chinese government's Belt and Road Development Strategy and completed October 2022 – January 2024; capacity approximately five million tons per year processed crude oil
- Akwaaba Refinery, 5,000 bbl/d (790 m^{3}/d) – operates inconsistently
- Platon Gas Oil Ghana Refinery LTD, Greater Accra region, Tema 3,000 bbl/d (480 m^{3}/d) – built 2013; modernization started 2017; operates inconsistently

=== Ivory Coast ===
- Abidjan Refinery I (Societe Ivoirienne de Raffinage (SIR) – Petroci 47.2%, Total 10.3%, Elf 15.1%, Shell 10.3%, Mobil 8%, Burkina Faso 5.4% and Texaco 3.7%) 100,000 bbl/d (16,000 m^{3}/d) Nelson Complexity Index 6.1 – opened 1963–65, re-started in 1980; previously damaged by fire but fully-repaired and operations seriously disturbed by strike in 1994; refining capacity over 3 million metric tonnes per year
  - Abidjan Bitumen Refinery (SMB Cote d'Ivoire, formerly Societe Multinationale de Bitumes SA), 10,500 bbl/d (1,670 m^{3}/d) – founded March 1976 and co-located with above refinery; capacity 525,000 tons of crude oil per year
- Yaatra Ventures Refinery, 170,000 bbl/d (27,000 m^{3}/d) – planned as of April 2025

=== Kenya ===
- KPRL Refinery (originally set up by Kenya Government (50%)/Shell(17.1%)/BP(17.1%)/Chevron(15.8%) as East African Oil Refineries Limited, previously owned by Kenya Government (50%)/Essar Energy of Mumbai, India(50%)), Mombasa, formerly 32,000 bbl/d (5,100 m^{3}/d), Nelson Complexity Index 2.64 – incorporated 1959–60 – Complex I commissioned 1963–64 and Complex II in 1974; nameplate capacity was 4 million metric tons per year but operated below that (around 1.6 million tons per year); operations halted in September 2013 after abandoned, economically unviable 2012 expansion plans; government took over in 2016 and was converted to storage terminal facility
- Lamu Oil Refinery, Lamu Port and Lamu-Southern Sudan-Ethiopia Transport Corridor (LAPSSET), 700,000 bbl/d (110,000 m^{3}/d) – finance and contractors not finalized; construction began September 2026
- Mombasa Refinery II, 650,000 bbl/d (103,000 m^{3}/d) – proposed 2026

=== Liberia ===
- VFuels LLC Modular Refinery (Conex Petroleum Group Inc., Conex Group JV Limited/Liberian Petroleum Refinery Company (LPRC)), Monrovia, 10,000 bbl/d (1,600 m^{3}/d) – started April 2019, acceptance test March 2020 at existing 55,000-tonne petroleum storage terminal that was commissioned in 2016; refinery to be commissioned by 2021

=== Libya ===
- Zawiya Refinery (Zawia Oil Refining Company, National Oil Corporation (NOC)), 120,000 bbl/d (19,000 m^{3}/d) – started 1974 at 60,000 bbl/d (9,500 m^{3}/d), second twin processing plant added 1977; asphalt plants opened 1980–84 with total output of 200,000 tons per year; resumed operations October 2020 after blockade against oil exports; to be upgraded
- Ras Lanuf Refinery (Ras Lanuf Oil & Gas Processing Company, NOC), formerly 220,000 bbl/d (35,000 m^{3}/d) – completed 1984; NOC and Trasta Consortium (United Arab Emirates) signed upgrade agreement to expand to 240,000 bbl/d (38,000 m^{3}/d);significantly damaged by anti-government protests during 2011 Libyan Civil War; closed since 2013 due to arbitration which was settled in February 2022 and negotiations regarding sale of remaining 50% stake ongoing, refinery rehabilitation by NOC needed to bring back into operation
- El-Brega Refinery (Sirte Oil Company, NOC; formerly in partnership with ExxonMobil), formerly 90,000 bbl/d (14,000 m^{3}/d) – production dropped by almost 90% (down to around 11,000 bbl/d (1,700 m^{3}/d)) amid 2011 Libyan Civil War
- Al-Sarir Refinery (Sarir Refining, Arabian Gulf Oil Company (AGOCO), NOC), 10,000 bbl/d (1,600 m^{3}/d) – back online late 2020 after blockade against oil exports; major overhaul completed January–February 2026, resumed operations after planned shutdown and safety tests
- Tobruk Refinery (Tobruk Refining, AGOCO, NOC), 20,000 bbl/d (3,200 m^{3}/d) – resumed operations at end of 2020 after blockade of oil exports and returned to full capacity October 2020
- Tobruk Refinery II, 300,000 bbl/d (48,000 m^{3}/d) – being proposed
- South Refinery (Zallaf Oil and Gas, NOC), Ubari, Fezzan, Murzuq Basin, 30,000 bbl/d (4,800 m^{3}/d) – proposed, tendering phase 2022, construction phase launched 2025 with Honeywell-UOP; to be supplied with crude oil from El Sharara oil field

Note: Libya's refining sector reportedly impacted by UN sanctions, specifically UN Resolution 883 of November 11, 1993, which banned Libya from importing refinery equipment.

=== Madagascar ===
- Toamasina Refinery (Galana Petroleum), formerly 12,000 bbl/d (1,900 m^{3}/d) – established 1966;destroyed in 1994 Cyclone Geralda

=== Mauritania ===
- Nouadhibou Refinery (SOMIR), 20,000 bbl/d (3,200 m^{3}/d) – typically runs at one-quarter capacity

=== Morocco ===
- Mohammedia Refinery (Société Anonyme Marocaine de l'Industrie du Raffinage (SAMIR)/Corral Petroleum Holdings (62+% – Sheikh Mohamed Houssein El Amoudi)), formerly 200,000 bbl/d (32,000 m^{3}/d) – established 1959–61; upgraded 1962–78; privatized (bought by Morocco Corral Group) May 1997; shutdown after fire caused by flood from Oued El Malach dam November 2002; upgraded 2012; closed August 2015, declared bankrupt and ordered liquidated March 2016, turned into a storage facility 2020–23, SONAGRE to assume control of SAMIR January 2026 with eventual upgrade plans to 240,000 bbl/d (38,000 m^{3}/d)
- Sidi Kacem (SAMIR/Corral Petroleum Holdings (73.9%)), Gharb-Chrarda-Béni Hssen, formerly 25,000 bbl/d (4,000 m^{3}/d) – commissioned 1940; privatized 1997; closed 2009, now a storage terminal
- Jorf Lasfar Refinery (SAMIR/International Petroleum Investment Company (IPIC)), 250,000 bbl/d (40,000 m^{3}/d) – planned – contract signed with Tekfen Construction and Installation Company for construction to begin April 2011

=== Niger ===
- Zinder Refinery (Société de Raffinage de Zinder), 20,000 bbl/d (3,200 m^{3}/d) – completed November 2011
- Dosso Refinery (Zimar Group), 100,000 bbl/d (16,000 m^{3}/d) – planned, memorandum of understanding signed in 2024

=== Nigeria ===
- Kaduna Refinery (Kaduna Refining and Petrochemicals Company (KRPC) since 1988, Nigerian National Petroleum Corporation (NNPC)), Kaduna State, formerly 110,000 bbl/d (17,000 m^{3}/d) – construction contract awarded 1977; fuels plant commissioned 1980; lubes plant commissioned 1983 (first of its kind in West Africa); petrochemical plant commissioned 1988; fuels plant to current capacity December 1986; 30,000 metric ton/year Linear Alkyl Benzene Plant of petrochemical plant commissioned March 1988 then merged to become KRPC; Turn Around Maintenance (TAM) 2013; closed January 2018 due to unavailability of crude oil; 2020–23 rehabilitation effort; presently (April 2026) inactive
- Port Harcourt Refinery (Port Harcourt Refining Company (PHRC), NNPC), Rivers State, formerly 210,000 bbl/d (33,000 m^{3}/d) – commissioned 1965 (initially capacity 35,000 bbl/d (5,600 m^{3}/d), "debottlenecked" to 60,000 bbl/d (9,500 m^{3}/d) 1972); additional refinery (capacity 150,000 bbl/d (24,000 m^{3}/d)) commissioned 1989; TAM 1992, 1994 and 2000; major maintenance intervention 2015; 2020–23 planned shutdown for rehabilitation work, resumed operating November 2024 at partial (60,000 bbl/d (9,500 m^{3}/d)) capacity after over three years; shutdown May 2025, presently (April 2026) inactive
- Warri Refinery (Warri Refining and Petrochemicals Company Limited (WRPC), NNPC), Warri, Delta State, formerly 125,000 bbl/d (19,900 m^{3}/d) – commissioned 1978; at current capacity 1987; merged with Ekpan Petrochemical Plants November 1988 to form WRPC; TAM 1989, 1994 and 2000 – production declined steadily except in the early 1990's; 2015 closure based on disrepair and crude oil shortages; 2020–23 rehabilitation effort, back online in December 2022 (shutdown weeks later) and December 2024 at 60% capacity; shutdown January 2025; presently (April 2026) inactive
- Waltersmith Refinery (Waltersmith Refining and Petrochemical Company, Waltersmith Petromen Oil (70%)/Nigerian Content Development and Monitoring Board (NCDMB – 30%)), Ohaji-Egbema Local Government Area, Ibigwe, Imo State, 10,000 bbl/d (1,600 m^{3}/d) since April 2026 – operations started November 2020 at 5,000 bbl/d (790 m^{3}/d) with planned capacity of 50,000 bbl/d (7,900 m^{3}/d)
- Dangote Refinery (Dangote Group 80% stake, owner Aliko Dangote/NNPC 20% stake), Lekki Free Zone, Lekki, Lagos State, 650,000 bbl/d (103,000 m^{3}/d) – announced 2013, construction begun 2016; commissioned May 2023 – September 2024, planned expansion to 1,400,000 bbl/d (220,000 m^{3}/d) by 2028–30
- Azikel Refinery (Azikel Petroleum, Azikel Group), Obunagha, Gbarain, Yenagoa, Bayelsa State, 12,000 bbl/d (1,900 m^{3}/d) Nelson Complexity Index 5.3 – ground-breaking ceremony February 2018, under construction since 2016, estimated completion 2025
- Ogbele Refinery (Niger Delta Petroleum Resources Limited (NDPR), Niger Delta Exploration & Production Plc (NDEP)), Ogbele, Rivers State, 1,000 bbl/d (160 m^{3}/d) Nelson Complexity Index 1 – commissioned December 2010
- Ondo State Refinery (Backbone Infrastructure Nigeria Limited (BINL)/NEFEX Holdings Limited), 500,000 bbl/d (79,000 m^{3}/d) – planned

=== Senegal ===
- Dakar Refinery (Société Africaine de Raffinage (SAR)), Mbao, 127,000 bbl/d (20,200 m^{3}/d) – started 1961 (West Africa's oldest refinery), processes around 1.5 million tons of crude per year
- Rufisque Refinery (SAR 2.0/Sedin Engineering, China National Engineering) – planned, agreement signed September 2024, construction to start 2026; 4 million tons of annual processing capacity; expected to start production 2029

=== Somalia ===
- New Silk Refinery (Singapore New Silk Somaliland Energy Co. Ltd. (SNSSEC)/China Power), Berbera District, 50,000 bbl/d (7,900 m^{3}/d) – 300,000+ gallons of diesel per day, construction begun 2019, opening 2028
- Jasiira Refinery, 10,000 bbl/d (1,600 m^{3}/d) – built in the late 1970s; Iraqi oil delieries halted at start of Iran-Iraq War; re-opened 1989 with erratic Iraqi crude oil imports
- Mogadishu Refinery, 200,000 bbl/d (32,000 m^{3}/d) – agreement signed with Industrial Export, Import, and Foreign Trade Company of Romania in May 1989, never built as of 1992
- Mogadishu Refinery II, at least 50,000 bbl/d (7,900 m^{3}/d) – deal to be finalized and construction to begin by 2027–28

=== South Africa ===
- Astron Energy Refinery (Astron Energy, Glencore South Africa Oil Investment (Pty) Ltd., since 2017), Milnerton, 100,000 bbl/d (16,000 m^{3}/d) – opened 1966; restarted operations May 2023 after an extended shutdown following an explosion in July 2020
- Engen Refinery (Engen Petroleum/Vivo Energy (74%), since May 2024, Vitol), Durban, formerly 120,000 bbl/d (19,000 m^{3}/d) – started operating 1954; permanently closed since a December 2020 fire and explosion; converted to an import and storage terminal
- SAPREF (South African Petroleum Refineries) Refinery (Central Energy Fund (CEF), since May 2024/Sapref), Durban, KwaZulu Natal, formerly 180,000 bbl/d (29,000 m^{3}/d) Nelson Complexity Index 8.44 – started operating 1963; shutdown operations at end of March 2022 after severe flooding and an oil leak damaged the facility; planned restart possible as of April 2026
- Sasol Refinery (Secunda CTL), Secunda, Mpumalanga, 150,000 bbl/d (24,000 m^{3}/d) – coal liquefaction and gasification plant
- Natref (National Petroleum Refiners of South Africa) Refinery (Sasol (64%)/Prax Group (36%, since December 2023)), Sasolburg, 108,500 bbl/d (17,250 m^{3}/d) – commissioned 1971
- Mossel Bay GTL Refinery (PetroSA), formerly 45,000 bbl/d (7,200 m^{3}/d) – 2020 shutdown due to insufficient natural gas supplies; December 2023 plans with Gazprombank to restart refinery, final investment decision not yet announced

=== South Sudan ===
- Tharjiath Refinery (Nilepet (30%)/Quad Layer Holdings (70%)), Unity State – proposed, feasibility studies to be done, Shengli Oilfield Keer Engineering and Construction Company (SOKEC) signed MoU to build refinery & storage facilities in November 2025
- Gameza Refinery, 100,000 bbl/d (16,000 m^{3}/d) – planned
- Akon Refinery (Akon Refinery Company), 50,000 bbl/d (7,900 m^{3}/d) – proposed
- Bentiu Refinery (Safinat/Nilepet), 3,000 bbl/d (480 m^{3}/d) – under construction with limited progress made
- Upper Nile Refinery (Government of South Sudan), Tangrial, 10,000 bbl/d (1,600 m^{3}/d) – planned but suspended

=== Sudan ===
- El Obeid Topping Plant (El Obeid Refinery Company – Sudapet), formerly 10,000 bbl/d (1,600 m^{3}/d) – looted after outbreak of war in April 2023
- al-Jaili Refinery (Sudan Khartoum Refinery Company - Sudapet 50%/China National Petroleum Corporation (CNPC - 50%)), formerly 100,000 bbl/d (16,000 m^{3}/d) – online May 2000; August 2003 – June 2006 expansion to current capacity; partially destroyed after outbreak of war in April 2023
- Port Sudan Refinery (Port Sudan Petroleum Refinery Limited – Sudapet), Port Sudan, Al Bahr Al Ahmar, formerly 21,700 bbl/d (3,450 m^{3}/d) – opened 1964; Memorandum of Understanding signed to rehabilitate and upgrade refinery in April 2013; decommissioned
- Shajirah Topping Plant (Concorp), formerly 10,000 bbl/d (1,600 m^{3}/d) – not operating
- Abu Gabra Topping Plant (Sudapet), formerly 2,000 bbl/d (320 m^{3}/d) – not operating

=== Tanzania ===
- Dar es Salaam Refinery (TIPER – Government of United Republic of Tanzania (Treasury Registrar)/Oryx Energies SA), formerly 17,000 bbl/d (2,700 m^{3}/d) – built 1966; ceased operations 1999-2000, turned into a storage terminal
- Tanga Refinery, 650,000 bbl/d (103,000 m^{3}/d) – proposed April 2026, to be delivered within 4–5 years

=== Tunisia ===
- Bizerte Refinery (Société Tunisienne des Industries de Raffinage (STIR), started 1961), Zarzouna, Bizerte, 34,000 bbl/d (5,400 m^{3}/d) – construction started 1961; production started 1963; revamped 1979, 1984, 1989 and 1997; expansion planned (in study phase in 2021) by the end of 2025
- La Skhira Refinery (Qatar Petroleum), 120,000 bbl/d (19,000 m^{3}/d) – prequalification tender process ended by June 2006–07; construction initially to begin by 2007–08; build-own-operate-transfer contract signed May 2021; capacity to eventually be increased to 150,000 bbl/d (24,000 m^{3}/d)

=== Uganda ===
- Uganda Oil Refinery (Uganda Refinery Holding Company, Uganda National Oil Company (UNOC – 40% stake))/Alpha MBM Investments LLC (60%), since 2023–24), Kabaale, Hoima District, 60,000 bbl/d (9,500 m^{3}/d) – planned, agreement signed March 2025, to begin operations by 2029–30

=== Zambia ===
- Indeni Petroleum Refinery (Indeni Petroleum Refinery Limited (IPRL), Industrial Development Corporation (IDC), Zambian Government, since November 2009), Ndola City, formerly 25,000 bbl/d (4,000 m^{3}/d) – commissioned 1973; ended refining July 2022
- Ndola Refinery II (IDC/Fujian Xiang Xin Holding Company Limited, Zambia Petrochemical Energy Company Limited (ZPEC)), Ndola, Copperbelt, 60,000 bbl/d (9,500 m^{3}/d) – memorandum of understanding signed 2025, Investment Promotion and Protection Agreement signed May 2026, construction ongoing, to be operational 2027–28

== Asia ==
=== Afghanistan ===
- Ghazanfar Oil Refinery (Ghazanfar Group), Hairatan, Balkh, 11,874 bbl/d (1,887.8 m^{3}/d)
- Kam Oil Refinery (Kam Group), Hairatan, Balkh, 11,874 bbl/d (1,887.8 m^{3}/d)
- Ansar Oil Refinery, Herat
- Amu Darya Refinery (China National Petroleum Corp. (CNPC)) – development deal signed 2011; practical work to start October 2012

=== Azerbaijan ===
- Heydar Aliyev Baku Oil Refinery (SOCAR), Baku, 160,000 bbl/d (25,000 m^{3}/d) – capacity increased from 6 to 7.5 million tons per year
- Azerneftyag Refinery (SOCAR), 2.3 million tonnes/year of crude oil – according SOCAR's 2013 annual report, was to be demolished as of 2018

=== Bahrain ===
- Bahrain Petroleum Company (BAPCO) Refinery, 267,000 bbl/d (42,400 m^{3}/d)

=== Bangladesh ===
- Eastern Refinery (BPC), 33,000 bbl/d (5,200 m^{3}/d)
- Petromax Refinery, 2,500 bbl/d (400 m^{3}/d)
- Super Petrochemical (Pvt.) Ltd. Refinery, 3,000 bbl/d (480 m^{3}/d)
- Bashundhara Oil and Gas Company Ltd. Refinery, 40,000 bbl/d (6,400 m^{3}/d)

=== China ===
- Fushun Petrochemical Refinery (Fushun Petrochemical Company, PetroChina, China National Petroleum Corporation (CNPC)), 186,200 bbl/d (29,600 m^{3}/d)
- Anqing Company Refinery (Sinopec), 110,000 bbl/d (17,000 m^{3}/d)
- Beijing Yanshan Company Refinery (Sinopec), 16,500 bbl/d (2,620 m^{3}/d)
- Lanzhou Refinery (PetroChina, CNPC), 111,300 bbl/d (17,700 m^{3}/d)
- CPCC Guangzhou Branch Refinery (Sinopec), 15,000 bbl/d (2,400 m^{3}/d)
- Maoming Company Refinery (Sinopec), 265,000 bbl/d (42,100 m^{3}/d)
- Beihai Company Refinery (Sinopec), 1,200 bbl/d (190 m^{3}/d)
- Cangzhou Company Refinery (Sinopec), 7,000 bbl/d (1,100 m^{3}/d)
- Daqing Petrochemical Refinery (PetroChina, CNPC), 121,500 bbl/d (19,320 m^{3}/d)
- Luoyang Company Refinery (Sinopec), 10,000 bbl/d (1,600 m^{3}/d)
- Jingmen Company Refinery (Sinopec), 10,000 bbl/d (1,600 m^{3}/d)
- Wuhan Company Refinery (Sinopec), 8,000 bbl/d (1,300 m^{3}/d)
- CPCC Changling Company Refinery (Sinopec), 100,000 bbl/d (16,000 m^{3}/d)
- Jinling Company Refinery (Sinopec), 260,000 bbl/d (41,000 m^{3}/d)
- Jiujiang Company Refinery (Sinopec), 9,800 bbl/d (1,560 m^{3}/d)
- Jilin Chemical Refinery (PetroChina, CNPC), 113,400 bbl/d (18,030 m^{3}/d)
- Dalian Petrochemical Refinery (PetroChina, CNPC), 400,000 bbl/d (64,000 m^{3}/d)
- Fushun Petrochemical Refinery (PetroChina, CNPC), 186,000 bbl/d (29,600 m^{3}/d)
- Jinxi Refinery (PetroChina, CNPC), 111,300 bbl/d (17,700 m^{3}/d)
- Jinzhou Petrochemical Refinery (PetroChina, CNPC), 112,000 bbl/d (17,800 m^{3}/d)
- WEPEC Dalain Refinery, 200,000 bbl/d (32,000 m^{3}/d)
- Jinan Company Refinery (Sinopec), 2,100 bbl/d (330 m^{3}/d)
- Qilu Refinery (Qilu Petrochemical Corporation, Sinopec), 210,000 bbl/d (33,000 m^{3}/d)
- Shanghai Gaoqiao Company Refinery (Sinopec), 22,000 bbl/d (3,500 m^{3}/d)
- Tianjin Company Refinery (Sinopec), 10,000 bbl/d (1,600 m^{3}/d)
- Dushanzi Refinery (PetroChina, CNPC), 120,000 bbl/d (19,000 m^{3}/d)
- Ürümqi Petrochemical Refinery (PetroChina, CNPC), 101,000 bbl/d (16,100 m^{3}/d)
- Zhenhai Refinery (Sinopec), 462,000 bbl/d (73,500 m^{3}/d)
- Tahe Integrated Refining and Chemical Complex (Sinopec), Xinjiang – crude oil processing capacity 5 million metric tons per year; to be upgraded by 2029
- Anshan Refinery (PetroChina, CNPC) – closed 2006
- Germu Refinery (PetroChina)
- Guangxi Qinzhou Refinery (PetroChina)
- Harbin Refinery (PetroChina)
- Huabei Petrochemical Refinery (PetroChina)
- Huhehaote Refinery (PetroChina)
- Jilin Oil Field Refinery (PetroChina)
- Lanzhou Petrochemical Company Refinery (PetroChina)
- Linyuan Refinery (PetroChina)
- Majiatan Refinery (PetroChina)
- Maling Refinery (PetroChina)
- Nanchong Refinery (PetroChina)
- Ningxia Yinchuan Refinery (PetroChina)
- Yumen Refining and Petrochemical Plant (PetroChina)
- Liaoyang Petrochemical Refinery (PetroChina)
- Hohhot Petrochemical Refinery (PetroChina), 100,000 bbl/d (16,000 m^{3}/d)
- Fujian Refining and Petrochemical Refinery (Sinopec), 240,000 bbl/d (38,000 m^{3}/d)
- Guangzhou Company Refinery (Sinopec), 260,000 bbl/d (41,000 m^{3}/d)
- Shijiazhuang Refinery (Sinopec), 84,000 bbl/d (13,400 m^{3}/d)

=== India ===
- Bongaigaon Refinery (IOCL), Bongaigaon, 3,760 bbl/d (598 m^{3}/d) or 2.35 million tonnes per year
- Digboi Refinery (IOCL), Upper Assam (India's Oldest Refinery), 0.62 million tonnes per year
- Guwahati Refinery (IOCL), Noonmati, Guwahati, 1,600 bbl/d (250 m^{3}/d) or 1.0 million tonnes per year
- Numaligarh Refinery (NRL), Golaghat District, 3.0 million tonnes per year; capacity to be expanded to 9 million tonnes per year
- Barauni Refinery (IOCL), near Patna, 6.0 million tonnes per year Nelson Complexity Index 7.8
- Nayara Refinery (Rosneft), 406,000 bbl/d (64,500 m^{3}/d) Nelson Complexity Index 12.8
- Gujarat Refinery (IOCL), Vadodara, Nelson Complexity Index 10.0
- Jamnagar Refinery (Reliance Industries – world's largest petroleum refinery), Gujarat, 1,400,000 bbl/d (220,000 m^{3}/d) Nelson Complexity Index 21.1
- Panipat Refinery (IOCL), 15 million tonnes per year Nelson Complexity Index 10.5
- Mangalore Refinery (Mangalore Refinery and Petrochemicals Limited), 199,000 bbl/d (31,600 m^{3}/d) Nelson Complexity Index 10.6
- Bina Refinery (BORL), 116,000 bbl/d (18,400 m^{3}/d)
- Guru Gobind Singh Refinery (HMEL), Bathinda, with capacity of 11.2 million tonnes per year or 230,000 bbl/d (37,000 m^{3}/d) Nelson Complexity Index 12.6
- Haldia Refinery (IOCL), 116,000 bbl/d (18,400 m^{3}/d) Nelson Complexity Index 10.4
- Paradip Refinery (IOCL), 303,000 bbl/d (48,200 m^{3}/d) Nelson Complexity Index 12.2
- Barmer Refinery (HPCL Rajasthan Refinery Limited), 208,000 bbl/d (33,100 m^{3}/d)
- Mathura Refinery (IOCL), 156,000 bbl/d (24,800 m^{3}/d)
- Mumbai Refinery (HPCL), 107,000 bbl/d (17,000 m^{3}/d)
- Mumbai Refinery Mahaul (BPCL), 135,000 bbl/d (21,500 m^{3}/d)
- Visakhapatnam Refinery (HPCL), 150,000 bbl/d (24,000 m^{3}/d)
- Tatipaka Refinery (ONGC), 100 bbl/d (16 m^{3}/d)
- Kochi Refinery (BPCL), 310,000 bbl/d (49,000 m^{3}/d) Nelson Complexity Index 10.8
- Manali Refinery (CPCL), Chennai, 185,000 bbl/d (29,400 m^{3}/d)
- Cuddalore Refinery (Nagarjuna Oil Corporation Limited), 125,000 bbl/d (19,900 m^{3}/d)
- Nagapattnam Refinery (CPCL), 20,000 bbl/d (3,200 m^{3}/d)

=== Indonesia ===
- Dumai Refinery (Pertamina), 170,000 bbl/d (27,000 m^{3}/d)
- Plaju Refinery (Pertamina), 126,000 bbl/d (20,000 m^{3}/d)
- Cilacap Refinery (Pertamina), Java, 300,000 bbl/d (48,000 m^{3}/d)
- Balikpapan Refinery (Pertamina), 360,000 bbl/d (57,000 m^{3}/d)
- Balongan Refinery (Pertamina), 150,000 bbl/d (24,000 m^{3}/d)
- Sorong Refinery (Pertamina), 10,000 bbl/d (1,600 m^{3}/d)
- Tuban Refinery and Petrochemical Complex (PT Pertamina Rosneft Pengolahan dan Petrokimia, Pertamina 55%/Rosneft 45%), East Java province, 300,000 bbl/d (48,000 m^{3}/d) – Joint Venture Agreement signed October 2016; under construction
- Pemping Refinery and Petrochemicals (Pertamina-ExxonMobil), 500,000 bbl/d (79,000 m^{3}/d)
- Pangkalan Brandan Refinery, 5,000 bbl/d (790 m^{3}/d)

=== Iran ===
- Abadan Refinery (NIODC), 450,000 bbl/d (72,000 m^{3}/d)
- Arvand Oil Refinery (NIODC), 120,000 bbl/d (19,000 m^{3}/d)
- Arak Refinery (NIODC), 250,000 bbl/d (40,000 m^{3}/d)
- Tehran Refinery (NIODC), 225,000 bbl/d (35,800 m^{3}/d)
- Isfahan Refinery (NIODC), 375,000 bbl/d (59,600 m^{3}/d)
- Tabriz Refinery (NIODC), 80,000 bbl/d (13,000 m^{3}/d) – online 1977
- Shiraz Refinery (NIODC), 40,000 bbl/d (6,400 m^{3}/d) – online 1973
- Lavan Refinery (NIODC), 60,000 bbl/d (9,500 m^{3}/d)
- Persian Gulf Star Oil Refinery (NIODC), 360,000 bbl/d (57,000 m^{3}/d)
- Kermanshah Refinery (NIODC), 25,000 bbl/d (4,000 m^{3}/d)
- Bandar Abbas Refinery (NIODC), 232,000 bbl/d (36,900 m^{3}/d) – online 1997
- Pars Refinery (NIODC), 150,000 bbl/d (24,000 m^{3}/d) – under construction
- Anahita Refinery (NIODC), 150,000 bbl/d (24,000 m^{3}/d) – under construction
- Bahman Geno Refinery (NIODC), 150,000 bbl/d (24,000 m^{3}/d) – under construction

=== Iraq ===
- Basrah Refinery (Iraq National Oil Company), 210,000 bbl/d (33,000 m^{3}/d)
- Daurah Refinery (Iraq National Oil Company), 180,000 bbl/d (29,000 m^{3}/d)
- Kirkuk Refinery (Iraq National Oil Company), 170,000 bbl/d (27,000 m^{3}/d)
- Baiji Salahedden Refinery (SCOP), 150,000 bbl/d (24,000 m^{3}/d) – online 1981
- Baiji North Refinery (Iraq National Oil Company), 150,000 bbl/d (24,000 m^{3}/d)
- Khanaqin/Alwand Refinery (Iraq National Oil Company), 10,500 bbl/d (1,670 m^{3}/d)
- Samawah Refinery (Iraq National Oil Company), 27,000 bbl/d (4,300 m^{3}/d)
- Haditha Refinery (Iraq National Oil Company), 14,000 bbl/d (2,200 m^{3}/d)
- Muftiah Refinery (Iraq National Oil Company), 4,500 bbl/d (720 m^{3}/d)
- Majd Al Iraq Refinery (Iraq National Oil Company), 6,500 bbl/d (1,030 m^{3}/d)
- Gaiyarah Refinery (Iraq National Oil Company), 4,000 bbl/d (640 m^{3}/d)
- Erbil Refinery (KAR Group), Kurdistan, 100,000 bbl/d (16,000 m^{3}/d)
- Mirsan Refinery (MIRC Group), Kurdistan 150,000 bbl/d (24,000 m^{3}/d)
- Karbala Refinery (South Oil Company (SOC)), 150,000 bbl/d (24,000 m^{3}/d)

=== Israel ===
- Ashdod Oil Refineries (Paz Oil Company), 108,000 bbl/d (17,200 m^{3}/d)
- Haifa Refinery (BAZAN Group), 197,000 bbl/d (31,300 m^{3}/d)

=== Japan ===
- Chiba Refinery (Cosmo Oil Company), 240,000 bbl/d (38,000 m^{3}/d)
- Yokkaichi Refinery (Cosmo Oil Company), 155,000 bbl/d (24,600 m^{3}/d)
- Sakai Refinery (Cosmo Oil Company), 100,000 bbl/d (16,000 m^{3}/d)
- Sakaide Refinery (Cosmo Oil Company, Ltd.), Sakaide, Kagawa, formerly 110,000 bbl/d (17,000 m^{3}/d) – commissioned 1972; upgraded 1980 and 2010; closed July 2013, converted into a terminal
- Muroran Refinery (Nippon Oil), Muroran, Iburi, Hokkaidō, previously 180,000 bbl/d (29,000 m^{3}/d) – commissioned 1973; upgraded 1982 and 2004; closed March 2014 and converted into a petrochemical plant in June 2014 with SK Group and a depot for petroleum products
- Sendai Refinery (Nippon Oil), 145,000 bbl/d (23,100 m^{3}/d)
- Negishi Yokohama Refinery (Nippon Oil), 270,000 bbl/d (43,000 m^{3}/d)
- Osaka Refinery (Nippon Oil, since April 2002), Takaishi City, Osaka Prefecture, formerly 115,000 bbl/d (18,300 m^{3}/d) – started 1970–71; expanded 1992, 1993, 1998 and 2003–04; closed 2020, converted to asphalt-fired power plant
- Mizushima Refinery (Nippon Oil), 250,000 bbl/d (40,000 m^{3}/d)
- Marifu Refinery (Nippon Oil, since April 2002), Waki-cho, Kuga-gun, Yamaguchi Prefecture, 127,000 bbl/d (20,200 m^{3}/d)
- Oita Refinery (Nippon Oil), 160,000 bbl/d (25,000 m^{3}/d)
- Toyama Refinery (Nihonkai Oil Company, Limited, Nippon Oil), Toyama City, formerly 60,000 bbl/d (9,500 m^{3}/d) – commissioned 1971; upgraded 1993; closed January 2009, converted to oil terminal by April 2009
- Kubiki Refinery (Teiseki Topping Plant Company, Ltd. (TTP), Inpex Corporation), Ogata-ku, Joetsu City, Niigata Prefecture, formerly 4,700 bbl/d (750 m^{3}/d) (Japan's smallest refinery) – commissioned 1963; closed down December 2012 – October 2013
- Chiba Refinery (Kyokuto Petroleum), 175,000 bbl/d (27,800 m^{3}/d)
- Kawasaki Refinery (ENEOS Corporation), formerly 335,000 bbl/d (53,300 m^{3}/d) – closed 1999
- Wakayama Refinery (Tonen General Sekiyu/ExxonMobil), 170,000 bbl/d (27,000 m^{3}/d)
- Sakai Refinery (ENEOS Corporation), 156,000 bbl/d (24,800 m^{3}/d)
- Nishihara Refinery (Nansei Sekiyu/Petrobras), 100,000 bbl/d (16,000 m^{3}/d)
- Keihin Refinery (Toa Oil/Royal Dutch Shell), 185,000 bbl/d (29,400 m^{3}/d)
- Showa Yokkaichi Refinery (Showa Yokkaichi/Royal Dutch Shell), 210,000 bbl/d (33,000 m^{3}/d)
- Yamaguchi Refinery (Seibu Oil/Royal Dutch Shell), 120,000 bbl/d (19,000 m^{3}/d)
- Sodegaura Refinery (Fuji Oil Company), 192,000 bbl/d (30,500 m^{3}/d)
- Kashima Refinery (Kashima Oil Company/Japan Energy), 210,000 bbl/d (33,000 m^{3}/d)
- Mizushima Refinery (Japan Energy), 205,200 bbl/d (32,620 m^{3}/d)
- Shikoku Refinery (Taiyo Oil), 120,000 bbl/d (19,000 m^{3}/d)
- Ohita Refinery (Kyusyu Oil), 160,000 bbl/d (25,000 m^{3}/d)
- Hokkaido Refinery (Idemitsu Kosan), 140,000 bbl/d (22,000 m^{3}/d)
- Chiba Refinery (Idemitsu Kosan), 220,000 bbl/d (35,000 m^{3}/d)
- Aichi Refinery (Idemitsu Kosan), 160,000 bbl/d (25,000 m^{3}/d)
- Tokuyama Refinery (Idemitsu Kosan), formerly 120,000 bbl/d (19,000 m^{3}/d) – closed 2014
- Okinawa Sekiyu Seisei Refinery (Idemitsu Kosan Company), formerly 100,000 bbl/d (16,000 m^{3}/d) – commissioned 1972; closed 2003

=== Jordan ===
- Jordan Refinery, Zarqa, Az Zarqa (Jordan Petroleum Refinery Company), 90,000 bbl/d (14,000 m^{3}/d)

=== Kazakhstan ===
- Atyrau Refinery (KazMunayGas), 104,400 bbl/d (16,600 m^{3}/d)
- Pavlodar Refinery (KazMunayGas), 162,600 bbl/d (25,850 m^{3}/d)
- Shymkent Refinery (PetroKazakhstan, CNPC 50%, since 2000/KazMunaiGaz 50%), 105,000 bbl/d (16,700 m^{3}/d) – commissioned 1985; upgraded 2012–14 and in 2017; plans to double its processing capacity to more than 90 million barrels/year as of June 2023

=== Kuwait ===
- Al Zour Refinery (Kuwait National Petroleum Company), 615,000 bbl/d (97,800 m^{3}/d)
- Mina Al-Ahmadi Refinery (Kuwait National Petroleum Company), 466,000 bbl/d (74,100 m^{3}/d)
- Mina Abdullah Refinery (Kuwait National Petroleum Company), 354,000 bbl/d (56,300 m^{3}/d)

=== Kyrgzstan ===
- "Junda" (800,000 tonnes/year)
- Tokmok (450,000 tonnes/year)
- Kant (300,000 tonnes/year)
- "Kyrgyz Petroleum" (300,000 tonnes/year)
- Jalal-Abad (60,000 tonnes/year)

=== Malaysia ===
- Pengerang Refining Company Sdn Bhd (PRefChem Refining) (Petronas and Saudi Aramco Joint Venture), 300,000 bbl/d (48,000 m^{3}/d) Nelson Complexity Index 9.5
- Malaysian Refining Company Sdn Bhd (MRCSB) (Petronas), Melaka, 300,000 bbl/d (48,000 m^{3}/d)
  - PSR-1, Melaka I Refinery (formerly known as Petronas Penapisan (Melaka) Sdn Bhd) (Petronas), 100,000 bbl/d (16,000 m^{3}/d)
  - PSR-2, Melaka II Refinery (formerly operated by Petronas and Phillips 66 Joint Venture) (Petronas), 100,000 bbl/d (16,000 m^{3}/d)
- Petronas Penapisan (Terengganu) Sdn Bhd (PP(T)SB) (Petronas), Kerteh, 124,000 bbl/d (19,700 m^{3}/d)
- Hengyuan Refining Company Berhad (formerly known as Shell Refining Company (Federation of Malaya) Berhad) (HRC), Port Dickson, 155,000 bbl/d (24,600 m^{3}/d) – built 1963
- Port Dickson Refinery (Petron), Port Dickson, 88,000 bbl/d (14,000 m^{3}/d)
- Miri Refinery (Shell) – built 1914
- Kemaman Bitumen Refinery (TIPCO), Kemaman, 100,000 bbl/d (16,000 m^{3}/d)
- Lutong Refinery (Shell), Sarawak, formerly 35,000 bbl/d (5,600 m^{3}/d) – started operations 1917; no longer in operation

=== Mongolia ===
- Mongol Refinery (Mongol Refinery State Owned LLC) 33,000 million bbl/d (5.2×10^{9} m^{3}/d) – under construction, planned in 2026

=== Myanmar ===
- Thanlyin Refinery (Myanma Petrochemical Enterprise), 20,000 bbl/d (3,200 m^{3}/d)

=== Oman ===
- Mina Al Fahal Refinery (OQ RPI), 106,000 bbl/d (16,900 m^{3}/d)
- Sohar Refinery Company (OQ RPI), 116,000 bbl/d (18,400 m^{3}/d)
- Duqm Refinery, Duqm, 230,000 bbl/d (37,000 m^{3}/d)

=== Pakistan ===
- Pak-Arab Refinery Ltd. (PARCO), Muzaffargarh, Qasba Gujrat, Punjab, 120,000 bbl/d (19,000 m^{3}/d)
- National Refinery (National Refinery Limited (NRL)), Korangi, Karachi, Sindh, 12,050 bbl/d (1,916 m^{3}/d) – online 1966
- Attock Refinery Ltd. (ARL), Rawalpindi, Punjab, 53,400 bbl/d (8,490 m^{3}/d)
- Byco Petroleum (Byco) Refinery, Hub, Baluchistan, 150,000 bbl/d (24,000 m^{3}/d) – started 2006
- Pakistan Refinery (PRL), Korangi Creek, Karachi, Sindh, 50,000 bbl/d (7,900 m^{3}/d)
- Enar Petroleum Refinery Training Facility (Enar), Gadap, Karachi, Sindh, 3,000 bbl/d (480 m^{3}/d)
- Grace Refinery Limited (GRL), Kot Addu, Muzaffargarh, Punjab, 120,000 bbl/d (19,000 m^{3}/d) – under construction
- Al Motahedon Petroleum Refineries, Kohat, KP, 50,000 bbl/d (7,900 m^{3}/d) – under construction
- Khyber Refinery (Pvt) Ltd, Kushalgarh, Kohat, KP, 20,000 bbl/d (3,200 m^{3}/d) – under construction

=== Philippines ===
- Bataan Refinery (Petron Corporation), Limay, Bataan, Luzon, 180,000 bbl/d (29,000 m^{3}/d), Nelson Complexity Index 13 – opened April 1961; expanded April 2011 – January 2016; shutdown May–September 2020 during Covid-19
- Tabangao Refinery (Pilipinas Shell Petroleum Corporation, Shell), Tabangao, Batangas City, Batangas, formerly 110,000 bbl/d (17,000 m^{3}/d) – began operations 1962; 2020 permanent shutdown; to be turned into import terminal

=== Qatar ===
- Um Said Refinery (QP Refinery), 147,000 bbl/d (23,400 m^{3}/d)
- Laffan Refinery 1 (QatarEnergy 51%/ExxonMobil 10%/Total 10%/Idemitsu 10%/Cosmo Oil Company 10%/Mitsui 4.5%/Marubeni 4.5%), 146,000 bbl/d (23,200 m^{3}/d)
- Laffan Refinery 2 (QatarEnergy 84%/Total 10%/Cosmo 2%/Idemitsu 2%/Mitsui 1%/Marubeni 1%), 146,000 bbl/d (23,200 m^{3}/d)
- Mesaieed Refinery, 137,000 bbl/d (21,800 m^{3}/d)
- Pearl GTL Refinery – launched 2006, set to be the world's largest plant, converting natural gas into 140,000 bbl/d (22,000 m^{3}/d) of clean-burning liquid transport fuel and other products and 120,000 bbl/d (19,000 m^{3}/d) of oil equivalent per day of natural gas liquids and ethane

=== Russia in Asia ===
The Asian portion of Russia has the following refineries:

- Achinsk Refinery (Rosneft), 129,000 bbl/d (20,500 m^{3}/d)
- Angarsk Petrochemical Refinery (Rosneft), 194,000 bbl/d (30,800 m^{3}/d)
- Antipinsky Refinery (RI-Invest), 180,000 bbl/d (29,000 m^{3}/d)
- Khabarovsk Refinery (АО), 86,000 bbl/d (13,700 m^{3}/d)
- Komsomolsk Refinery (Rosneft), 143,000 bbl/d (22,700 m^{3}/d)
- Nizhnevartovsk Refinery (TNK-BP), 25,100 bbl/d (3,990 m^{3}/d)
- Omsk Refinery (Gazprom Neft), 362,000 bbl/d (57,600 m^{3}/d)
- Tobolsk Petrochemical Refinery (Sibur), 138,000 bbl/d (21,900 m^{3}/d)
- Yaya Refinery (NefteKhimService), 57,000 bbl/d (9,100 m^{3}/d)

=== Saudi Arabia ===
- Riyadh Refinery (Saudi Aramco), 120,000 bbl/d (19,000 m^{3}/d)
- Rabigh Refinery (Petromin, Petrola), 325,000 bbl/d (51,700 m^{3}/d) – online 1990
- Jiddah Refinery (Saudi Aramco), formerly 100,000 bbl/d (16,000 m^{3}/d) – closed
- Ras Tanura Refinery (Saudi Aramco), 550,000 bbl/d (87,000 m^{3}/d) – oldest in country
- Yanbu' Refinery (Saudi Aramco), 225,000 bbl/d (35,800 m^{3}/d)
- Yanbu' JV Refinery (Saudi Arabian Oil Company, Saudi Aramco/Mobil Yanbu Refining Company Inc., ExxonMobil, Saudi Aramco Mobil Refinery Company Limited (SAMREF)), Yanbu Al-Sinaiyah, 400,000 bbl/d (64,000 m^{3}/d) - commissioned 1984; upgraded 2009-13
- Jubail Refinery (Saudi Aramco Total Refining & Petrochemical Company (SATORP) - Saudi Arabian Oil Company, Saudi Aramco - 62.5%/Total - 37.5%), Jubail Industrial City, 465,000 bbl/d (73,900 m^{3}/d) - Memorandum of Understanding signed for proposed, new export refinery 2006; project completed 2013
- Yanbu' Refinery (Saudi Aramco - 62.5%/China Petrochemical Corporation (Sinopec Group - 37.5%), since 2011, Yanbu Aramco Sinopec Refining Company (YASREF)), 400,000 bbl/d (64,000 m^{3}/d) - upgraded 2006-14
- Jazan Refinery (Saudi Aramco, 400,000 bbl/d (64,000 m^{3}/d)
- Jubail Refinery (SASREF) (Saudi Aramco/Shell), 305,000 bbl/d (48,500 m^{3}/d)

=== Singapore ===
- Jurong Island Refinery (ExxonMobil), 605,000 bbl/d (96,200 m^{3}/d)
- Jurong Island Refinery (Singapore Petroleum Company), 285,000 bbl/d (45,300 m^{3}/d) – operating at 117,000 bbl/d (18,600 m^{3}/d) in 2024
- Pulau Bukom Refinery (Royal Dutch Shell), 500,000 bbl/d (79,000 m^{3}/d)

=== Sri Lanka ===
- Sapugaskanda Refinery (Sri Lanka Petroleum Corporation), 38,000 bbl/d (6,000 m^{3}/d) – online 1968

=== South Korea ===
- Ulsan Refinery (SK Energy), 840,000 bbl/d (134,000 m^{3}/d)
- Yeosu Refinery (GS Caltex), 730,000 bbl/d (116,000 m^{3}/d)
- Onsan Refinery (S-Oil), 669,000 bbl/d (106,400 m^{3}/d)
- Daesan Refinery (Hyundai Oilbank), 561,000 bbl/d (89,200 m^{3}/d)
- SK Incheon Petrochem (SK Innovation/SK Incheon Petrochem), 275,000 bbl/d (43,700 m^{3}/d)

=== Syria ===
- Homs Refinery
- Baniyas Refinery 95,000 bbl/d (15,100 m^{3}/d)

=== Taiwan ===
- Dalin Refinery (CPC), 100,000 bbl/d (16,000 m^{3}/d)
- Kaohsiung Refinery (CPC), formerly 270,000 bbl/d (43,000 m^{3}/d) – ceased operations end of 2015
- Mailiao Refinery (Formosa Plastics Corp), 540,000 bbl/d (86,000 m^{3}/d)
- Taoyuan Refinery (CPC), 200,000 bbl/d (32,000 m^{3}/d)

=== Tajikistan ===
- Dengara Oil Refinery – completed in 2018 & was operating in "test mode" at end of 2024, planned capacity of 1.2 million tonnes/year

=== Thailand ===
- Thai Oil Refinery (Thai Oil Company of PTT Public Company Limited), 275,000 bbl/d (43,700 m^{3}/d)
- IRPC Refinery (IRPC PLC of PTT), 215,000 bbl/d (34,200 m^{3}/d)
- PTT Global Chemical Refinery (PTT Global Chemical PLC of PTT), 280,000 bbl/d (45,000 m^{3}/d)
- SPRC Refinery (Chevron NOJV), 175,000 bbl/d (27,800 m^{3}/d)
- Bangchak Phra Khanong Refinery (Bangchak Petroleum), 120,000 bbl/d (19,000 m^{3}/d)
- Bangchak Si Racha Sriracha Refinery (Bangchak Petroleum), 177,000 bbl/d (28,100 m^{3}/d)
- Rayong Refinery (Rayong Refinery Company, Petroleum Authority of Thailand/Thai National Oil Company/Shell International), 145,000 bbl/d (23,100 m^{3}/d) – completed 1996

=== Turkey ===
- STAR Refinery (SOCAR), 214,000 bbl/d (34,000 m^{3}/d) – operating since late 2018
- Kirikkale Refinery (Tüpraş), 112,500 bbl/d (17,890 m^{3}/d)
- Izmit Refinery (Tüpraş), 226,000 bbl/d (35,900 m^{3}/d)
- Aliaga Refinery (Tüpraş), 200,000 bbl/d (32,000 m^{3}/d)
- Batman Refinery (Tüpraş), 22,000 bbl/d (3,500 m^{3}/d)
- Doğu Akdeniz Petrol Refinery (Çalık Holding) – under construction
- ATAŞ (Refinery) (BP/Royal Dutch Shell/Turcas) – closed 2004

=== Turkmenistan ===
- Seidi Refinery, 120,000 bbl/d (19,000 m^{3}/d)
- Turkmenbashi Refinery, 116,000 bbl/d (18,400 m^{3}/d)

=== United Arab Emirates ===
- Abu Dhabi Refinery (Abu Dhabi Oil Refining Company), 85,000 bbl/d (13,500 m^{3}/d)
- Fujairah VTTI Refinery (Vitol Group), 80,000 bbl/d (13,000 m^{3}/d)
- Fujairah ECOMAR Refinery, 7,500 bbl/d (1,190 m^{3}/d)
- Fujairah heavy crude oil flashers (Uniper), 70,000 bbl/d (11,000 m^{3}/d)
- Ruwais Refinery (Abu Dhabi National Oil Company (ADNOC)), 817,000 bbl/d (129,900 m^{3}/d) – two refineries
- Jebel Ali Refinery (ENOC), 140,000 bbl/d (22,000 m^{3}/d)
- Al Nakheel Oil Refinery (ANOR) – closed

=== Vietnam ===
- Dung Quat Refinery (Petrovietnam), 148,000 bbl/d (23,500 m^{3}/d)
- Nghi Sơn Refinery (Nghi Son Refinery and Petrochemical LLC), 200,000 bbl/d (32,000 m^{3}/d)

=== Yemen ===
- Aden Refinery (Aden Refinery Company), 120,000 bbl/d (19,000 m^{3}/d)
- Marib Refinery (Hunt Oil Company), 10,000 bbl/d (1,600 m^{3}/d) – dedicated April 1986

== Europe ==
=== Albania ===
- Ballsh Refinery (ARMO Oil Refiner), formerly 20,000 bbl/d (3,200 m^{3}/d) – closed 2019
- Fier Refinery (ARMO Oil Refiner), 10,000 bbl/d (1,600 m^{3}/d)
- Bitex Refinery, Elbasan, 3,750 bbl/d (596 m^{3}/d)

=== Austria ===
- Schwechat Refinery (OMV), 176,000 bbl/d (28,000 m^{3}/d)

=== Bosnia and Herzegovina ===
- Bosanski Brod Refinery (Energoinvest), 29,800 bbl/d (4,740 m^{3}/d) – online 1969, 1.5 million tonnes per year

=== Belarus ===
- Mozyr Refinery (Slavneft, 21% stake Rosneft), 95,000 bbl/d (15,100 m^{3}/d)
- Novopolotsk Refinery (Naftan), 81,131 bbl/d (12,898.8 m^{3}/d)

=== Belgium ===
- Antwerp Refinery (Total), Port of Antwerp, 360,000 bbl/d (57,000 m^{3}/d) Nelson Complexity Index 8.4 – commissioned 1951; upgraded 2003–05, 2008 and 2012–17
- Antwerp Refinery (ExxonMobil), 333,000 bbl/d (52,900 m^{3}/d)
- Antwerp N.V. Refinery (Vitol), formerly 35,000 bbl/d (5,600 m^{3}/d) – closed 2021, converted to distribution terminal
- Independent Belgian Refinery (IBR – Gunvor, since 2012), Antwerp, formerly 110,000 bbl/d (17,000 m^{3}/d) – commissioned 1968; upgraded 1973, 1986 and 2005; temporarily closed February 2011; closed 2020, converted to distribution terminal

=== Bulgaria ===
- Neftochim Burgas Refinery (Lukoil), 208,000 bbl/d (33,100 m^{3}/d)

=== Croatia ===
- Rijeka Refinery (INA Industrija Nafte), 22,610 bbl/d (3,595 m^{3}/d) – online 1964
- Sisak Refinery (INA), 60,000 bbl/d (9,500 m^{3}/d)

=== Czech Republic ===
- Litvinov Refinery (Orlen Unipetrol), 120,000 bbl/d (19,000 m^{3}/d)
- Kralupy Refinery (Orlen Unipetrol), 80,000 bbl/d (13,000 m^{3}/d)
- Pardubice Refinery (PARAMO, owned by Orlen Unipetrol), formerly 15,000 bbl/d (2,400 m^{3}/d) – closed 2012, converted to distribution terminal

=== Denmark ===
- Kalundborg Refinery (Klesch), 110,000 bbl/d (17,000 m^{3}/d)
- Fredericia Refinery (Royal Dutch Shell), 68,000 bbl/d (10,800 m^{3}/d)

=== Finland ===
- Porvoo Refinery (Neste), 206,000 bbl/d (32,800 m^{3}/d)
- Naantali Refinery (Neste Oil Oyj), formerly 58,000 bbl/d (9,200 m^{3}/d) – closed 2021, converted to distribution terminal

=== France ===
- Normandy Refinery (Total), Gonfreville, 240,000 bbl/d (38,000 m^{3}/d) – upgraded 1998–2003, 2007, 2009 and 2012-13
- Port Jérôme-Gravenchon Refinery (ExxonMobil), 270,000 bbl/d (43,000 m^{3}/d)
- Donges Refinery (Total), 231,000 bbl/d (36,700 m^{3}/d)
- Lavera Oil Refinery (PetroIneos), 210,000 bbl/d (33,000 m^{3}/d)
- Fos-sur-Mer Refinery (ExxonMobil), 140,000 bbl/d (22,000 m^{3}/d)
- Feyzin Refinery (Total), 119,000 bbl/d (18,900 m^{3}/d)

==== Closed ====
- Flandres Refinery (Total), Dunkirk, formerly 156,000 bbl/d (24,800 m^{3}/d) – closed September 2009-10
- La Mède Refinery (Total), Provence, formerly 155,000 bbl/d (24,600 m^{3}/d) – explosion November 1992 and shutdown for several months; closed 2015–16; converted to biorefinery, reopened 2019
- Petit Couronne Refinery (Petroplus, since 2007), Petit Couronne, formerly 162,000 bbl/d (25,800 m^{3}/d) – started 1929; closed 2011-12
- Berre-l'Etang Refinery (LyondellBasell), formerly 110,000 bbl/d (17,000 m^{3}/d) – mothballed 2011
- Grandpuits Refinery (Total), formerly 99,000 bbl/d (15,700 m^{3}/d) – crude processing stopped 2021, being converted to biorefinery and plastic recycling complex
- Reichstett Refinery (Petroplus, 2007), Alsace, formerly 85,000 bbl/d (13,500 m^{3}/d) – started 1963; closed 2010-11 and converted to terminal

=== Germany ===
- Wilhelmshaven Refinery (Hestya), 300,000 bbl/d (48,000 m^{3}/d)
- Karlsruhe Refinery (MiRO (Shell/Rosneft/Phillips 66)), 58,000 bbl/d (9,200 m^{3}/d) Nelson Complexity Index 7.7 (was 9.33)
- Ruhr Öl Refinery (BP), 266,000 bbl/d (42,300 m^{3}/d) Nelson Complexity Index 8.44
- Ingolstadt Refinery (The Carlyle Group and Vitol, Varo Energy – 45%/Bayernoil -55%, previously Erdoelraffinerie Ingolstadt A.G. (ERIAG)), Bavaria, formerly 80,000 bbl/d (13,000 m^{3}/d) Nelson Complexity Index 7.20 – commissioned 1964 at 50,000 bbl/d (7,900 m^{3}/d); upgraded and expanded in 1974, 1978 and 1980; closed down 2008
- Mitteldeutschland Spergau Refinery (Total), Leuna works site, Saxony-Anhalt, 240,000 bbl/d (38,000 m^{3}/d) Nelson Complexity Index 6.4 – started operations 1997; upgraded 2007, 2009 and 2014
- Schwedt Refinery (PCK Raffinerie GmbH (Shell/Rosneft/Eni – 8.3%), 210,000 bbl/d (33,000 m^{3}/d) Nelson Complexity Index 10.43
- Rheinland Werk Godorf Cologne Refinery (Shell), 162,000 bbl/d (25,800 m^{3}/d)
- Rheinland Werk Wesseling Cologne Refinery (Shell), 160,000 bbl/d (25,000 m^{3}/d)
- Ingolstadt Refinery (Gunvor Raffinerie Ingolstadt GmbH, Gunvor, since 2012), Ingolstadt, 110,000 bbl/d (17,000 m^{3}/d) Nelson Complexity Index 7.3 – commissioned 1963; closed February 2012; re-started August 2012
- Hamburg (Holborn) Refinery (Tamoil), 100,000 bbl/d (16,000 m^{3}/d)
- Raffinerie Heide (Klesch), 90,000 bbl/d (14,000 m^{3}/d) Nelson Complexity Index 9.9
- Emsland Lingen Refinery (BP), 80,000 bbl/d (13,000 m^{3}/d) Nelson Complexity Index 10.77
- Burghausen Refinery (OMV), 70,000 bbl/d (11,000 m^{3}/d)
- Elbe Mineralölwerke Hamburg-Harburg Refinery (previously Shell Deutschland Oil GmbH, Shell – sold to Nynas AB in 2013), Hamburg, 110,000 bbl/d (17,000 m^{3}/d) – commissioned 1929; upgraded 2009; to be closed and converted into a terminal in 2012
- Neustadt an der Donau-Vohburg Refinery, (Bayernoil Raffineriegesellschaft mbH (Varo Energy B.V. – 45%, since 2013–14/Rosneft, since 2010/Eni – 20%)), Bavaria, 206,000 bbl/d (32,800 m^{3}/d) Nelson Complexity Index 6.8 – operations began 1967; upgraded 2007–09

=== Greece ===
- Corinth Refinery (Motor Oil Hellas), Corinth, Peloponnese, 255,000 bbl/d (40,500 m^{3}/d)
- Aspropyrgos Refinery (Hellenic Petroleum), Aspropyrgos, West Attica, 148,000 bbl/d (23,500 m^{3}/d)
- Elefsina Refinery (Hellenic Petroleum), Elefsina, West Attica, 100,000 bbl/d (16,000 m^{3}/d)
- Thessaloniki Refinery (Hellenic Petroleum), Thessaloniki, Central Macedonia, 93,000 bbl/d (14,800 m^{3}/d)

=== Hungary ===
- Szazhalombatta Refinery (MOL), Szazhalombatta, Pest, 161,000 bbl/d (25,600 m^{3}/d)

=== Ireland ===
- Whitegate refinery (Irving Oil), 71,000 bbl/d (11,300 m^{3}/d) Nelson Complexity Index 3.8

=== Italy ===
- Sarroch Refinery (Saras S.p.A. Raffinerie Sarde), 135,000 bbl/d (21,500 m^{3}/d) – online 1964
- Impianti Sud Refinery (ISAB, Lukoil), Priolo, Sicily, 220,000 bbl/d (35,000 m^{3}/d) – online 1978
- Milazzo RAM Refinery (Eni – 50%/KNPC – 50%), 200,000 bbl/d (32,000 m^{3}/d)
- Novara Refinery (Sarprom Trecate 74.1%/Erg 25.9%), 200,000 bbl/d (32,000 m^{3}/d)
- Augusta Refinery (Raffineria Siciliana Oli Minerali (RASIOM)), Sicily, 100,000 bbl/d (16,000 m^{3}/d) – online 1965
- Impianti Nord Refinery (Lukoil/Erg), 160,000 bbl/d (25,000 m^{3}/d)
- Sannazzaro de' Burgondi Refinery (Eni's Refining & Marketing division), Turin-Milan-Genoa industrial triangle, Po Valley, 180,000 bbl/d (29,000 m^{3}/d) – built 1963, original annual capacity five million tonnes, then capacity doubled by 1975, revamped 1988–92 and upgraded 2004–09; further 23,000 bbl/d (3,700 m^{3}/d) upgrade proposed in 2006–07 and planned by 2011–12
- Falconara Marittima Ancona Refinery (API), 85,000 bbl/d (13,500 m^{3}/d)
- Taranto Refinery (Eni), 120,000 bbl/d (19,000 m^{3}/d) – began operation 1967, processing capacity of 6.5 million tonnes of crude oil; upgraded 2009; emergency flares activated in 2015 and January 2016
- Busalla Refinery (IPLOM), 37,800 bbl/d (6,010 m^{3}/d) – 1,890,000 tonne per year
- Villasanta Refinery (Lombarda Petroli), 18,100 bbl/d (2,880 m^{3}/d) – online 1964

==== Closed ====
- Livorno Refinery (Eni), formerly 85,000 bbl/d (13,500 m^{3}/d) – crude processing being stopped in 2022
- Porto Marghera Venice Refinery (Eni S.p.A., since 1978), formerly 70,000 bbl/d (11,000 m^{3}/d) – started 1926; expanded 1934; reconstructed after WWII in 1947; upgraded 1968 and 1989; closed, converted into a green bio-refinery in 2012-14, restarted production of Green Diesel from vegetable oils in 2014-15
- Cremona Refinery (Tamoil, since 1988), Po Valley, formerly 96,000 bbl/d (15,300 m^{3}/d) – commissioned 1965; upgraded 1982; closed 2011, converted into a terminal
- Mantova Refinery (IES Italiana), formerly 55,000 bbl/d (8,700 m^{3}/d) – closed January 2013
- Gela Refinery (Eni), formerly 100,000 bbl/d (16,000 m^{3}/d) – closed, being converted into biorefinery
- Rome Refinery (Total 49%/ERG 51%, since 2010), Rome, formerly 86,000 bbl/d (13,700 m^{3}/d) – commissioned 1965; revamped 1990; closed 2012, to be converted to a terminal

=== Lithuania ===
- Mažeikių Refinery (Mazeikiu Nafta – PKN Orlen), 263,000 bbl/d (41,800 m^{3}/d)

=== Netherlands ===
- Pernis Refinery (Royal Dutch Shell), Rotterdam, 404,000 bbl/d (64,200 m^{3}/d)– upgraded by the end of 2018
- Rotterdam #2 Refinery (BP), 400,000 bbl/d (64,000 m^{3}/d) Nelson Complexity Index 5.29
- Botlek Refinery (Esso Nederland BV, ExxonMobil), Rotterdam, 190,000 bbl/d (30,000 m^{3}/d) - built late in the 1950s; upgraded 2016-18
- Zeeland Refinery (Total – 55%/Lukoil – 45%, since 2009), Industrial East Flushing, 190,000 bbl/d (30,000 m^{3}/d) Nelson Complexity Index 9.8 – startup of refinery 1973; upgraded 1986
- Gunvor Refinery (Gunvor Energy Rotterdam (GER), since January 2023, Gunvor, since 2016), Europoort, Port of Rotterdam, formerly 75,000 bbl/d (11,900 m^{3}/d) – crude processing stopped 2020
- VPR Refinery (Vitol) (in escrow), 80,000 bbl/d (13,000 m^{3}/d)

=== North Macedonia ===
- OKTA Skopje Refinery (Hellenic Petroleum), 50,000 bbl/d (7,900 m^{3}/d)

=== Norway ===
- Slagen Refinery (ExxonMobil), formerly 110,000 bbl/d (17,000 m^{3}/d) – closed 2021, converted to import terminal
- Mongstad Refinery (Equinor), 200,000 bbl/d (32,000 m^{3}/d)
- Sola Refinery (Norske Shell), formerly 40,000 bbl/d (6,400 m^{3}/d) – commissioned 1968; closed 2000

=== Poland ===
- Plock Refinery (PKN Orlen), Płock, 276,000 bbl/d (43,900 m^{3}/d)
- Gdańsk Refinery (Grupa LOTOS S.A.), Gdańsk, 210,000 bbl/d (33,000 m^{3}/d) – built 1973–74 (original nameplate capacity ca.3 million tpa); upgraded many times from 1994–2010; processing capacity after second distillation startup in December 2010 to 10.5 million tpa (2011)
- Czechowice Refinery (Grupa LOTOS S.A.), formerly 12,000 bbl/d (1,900 m^{3}/d) – crude oil processing terminated, first quarter 2006
- Trzebinia Refinery (PKN Orlen), 4,000 bbl/d (640 m^{3}/d)
- Jasło Oil Refinery (Grupa LOTOS S.A.), formerly 3,000 bbl/d (480 m^{3}/d) – crude oil processing terminated, fourth quarter 2008
- Jedlicze Refinery (PKN Orlen), 2,800 bbl/d (450 m^{3}/d)
- Glimar Refinery (Hudson Oil), formerly 3,400 bbl/d (540 m^{3}/d) – all operations (including crude oil processing) terminated 2005, acquired 2011

=== Portugal ===
- Sines Refinery (Galp Energia/Eni – 33%), 220,000 bbl/d (35,000 m^{3}/d)
- Porto Refinery (Petrogal, Galp Energia), formerly 110,000 bbl/d (17,000 m^{3}/d) – closed April 2021; produced around 2.3 million tonnes per year of diesel, gasoline, and kerosene fuels

=== Romania ===
- Petromidia Constanţa Refinery (Rompetrol), 100,000 bbl/d (16,000 m^{3}/d)
- Petrobrazi Refinery (Petrom/OMV), Ploiești, 90,000 bbl/d (14,000 m^{3}/d) – 4.5 million tonnes per year; started 1934; mostly destroyed during WWII then rebuilt; upgraded 2005
- Petrotel Lukoil Refinery (Petrotel/Lukoil), Ploiești, 68,000 bbl/d (10,800 m^{3}/d) – upgraded 2004
- Vega Ploiești Refinery (Rompetrol), 20,000 bbl/d (3,200 m^{3}/d)
- Petrolsub Suplacu de Barcău Refinery (Petrom/OMV), 15,000 bbl/d (2,400 m^{3}/d)

==== Closed ====
- RAFO Oneşti Refinery (Calder A), formerly 70,000 bbl/d (11,000 m^{3}/d) – closed
- Steaua Romană Câmpina Refinery (Omnimpex Chemicals), formerly 15,000 bbl/d (2,400 m^{3}/d) – closed
- Arpechim Refinery (Petrom, since 1997, – 49%/OMV, since 2003, – 51%), Pitești, formerly 70,000 bbl/d (11,000 m^{3}/d) Nelson Complexity Index 7.3 – founded 1964; upgraded 1967 and 2005; mothballed November 2009; partially operated on an "as needed" basis in 2010; closed 2011, operated as a terminal
- Astra Refinery (Interagro), formerly 20,000 bbl/d (3,200 m^{3}/d) – closed

=== Russia in Europe ===
The European portion of Russia contains the following refineries:

- Afipsky Refinery, design capacity 6.25 million tons per year or 143,833 bbl/d (22,867.6 m^{3}/d)
- Ilsky Refinery (INPZ), 6.6 million tonnes annually - struck by Ukrainian attacks at least sixteen times between May 2023-2 June 2026
- Kirishi Refinery (Surgutneftegas), 346,000 bbl/d (55,000 m^{3}/d)
- Krasnodar Refinery (Russneft), 52,000 bbl/d (8,300 m^{3}/d)
- Kuibyshev Refinery (Rosneft), Samara Oblast, 120,500 bbl/d (19,160 m^{3}/d)
- Novokuibyshevsk Refinery (Rosneft), Samara Oblast, 136,000 bbl/d (21,600 m^{3}/d)
- Nizhnekamsk Refinery (Tatneft, TANEKO), 150,000 bbl/d (24,000 m^{3}/d)
- Nizhnekamsk Refinery (TAIF), 143,000 bbl/d (22,700 m^{3}/d)
- Kstovo Refinery (Lukoil), Nizhny Novgorod Oblast, 293,000 bbl/d (46,600 m^{3}/d) – 2.1 million tonnes per year as of 2021
- Neftekhim Salavat refinery, Bashkortostan
- Novoshakhtinsk Refinery (Новошахтинский завод нефтепродуктов), 172,600 bbl/d (27,440 m^{3}/d)
- Orsk Refinery (SAFMAR), 114,000 bbl/d (18,100 m^{3}/d)
- Perm Refinery (Lukoil), 226,000 bbl/d (35,900 m^{3}/d)
- Ryazan Refinery (Rosneft), 295,000 bbl/d (46,900 m^{3}/d)
- Salavatnefteorgsintez Refinery (Gazprom), 172,000 bbl/d (27,300 m^{3}/d)
- Syzran Refinery (Rosneft), 120,500 bbl/d (19,160 m^{3}/d)
- Tuapse Refinery (Rosneft), 207,000 bbl/d (32,900 m^{3}/d)
- Ukhta Refinery (Lukoil), 72,000 bbl/d (11,400 m^{3}/d)
- Ufa Refinery (Bashneft), 129,000 bbl/d (20,500 m^{3}/d)
- Novo-Ufa Refinery (Bashneft), 122,500 bbl/d (19,480 m^{3}/d)
- Ufaneftekhim Refinery (Bashneft), 160,000 bbl/d (25,000 m^{3}/d)
- Volgograd Refinery (Lukoil), 250,000 bbl/d (40,000 m^{3}/d)
- Yaroslavl Refinery (Slavneft), 271,000 bbl/d (43,100 m^{3}/d)
- Saratov oil refinery, (TNK-BP), 108,000 bbl/d (17,200 m^{3}/d)

=== Serbia ===
- Pančevo Refinery (Naftna Industrija Srbije), 4.8 million tonnes/year
- Novi Sad Refinery (Naftna Industrija Srbije), 2.6 million tonnes/year
- Hemco Refinery (Hemco Lubricants)

=== Slovakia ===
- Slovnaft Bratislava Refinery (Slovnaft), 110,000 bbl/d (17,000 m^{3}/d)
- Petrochema Dubová Refinery (Russian investors), Petrochema

=== Spain ===
- Bilbao Muskiz Refinery (Petroleos del Norte, S.A. (Petronor), since 1968, Repsol YPF), Somorrostro (Vizcaya), 240,000 bbl/d (38,000 m^{3}/d) – commissioned 1970; partially mothballed 2009; upgraded and restarted 2010, upgraded again in 2011
- Puertollano Refinery (Repsol Petroleo, S.A.), 170,000 bbl/d (27,000 m^{3}/d) – commissioned 1965; upgraded 1999–2000 and 2005
- Tarragona Refinery (Repsol Petroleo, S.A.), 186,000 bbl/d (29,600 m^{3}/d) – opened 1975; upgraded 1983, 1999, 2002 and 2007
- Tarragona Asphalt Refinery (ASESA), 20,000 bbl/d (3,200 m^{3}/d)
- La Coruña Refinery (Repsol), Bens Valley, 120,000 bbl/d (19,000 m^{3}/d) – started September 1964
- Cartagena Refinery (Repsol YPF), Murcia, 220,000 bbl/d (35,000 m^{3}/d), since 2011 – upgraded again 2012-14
- Tenerife Refinery (Compania Espanola de Petroleos, S.A., CEPSA (IPIC)), Tenerife, 90,000 bbl/d (14,000 m^{3}/d) – commissioned 1930; upgraded 2002; to be closed, 2030
- La Rábida Refinery (CEPSA), Palos de la Frontera, Huelva, 190,000 bbl/d (30,000 m^{3}/d) – upgraded 2007–10
- Gibraltar-San Roque Refinery (CEPSA (IPIC)), Gibraltar-San Roque, 240,000 bbl/d (38,000 m^{3}/d) – commissioned 1969; upgraded 1997, 2003–04 and 2011
- Castellon Refinery (BP), 100,000 bbl/d (16,000 m^{3}/d) Nelson Complexity Index 10.58

=== Sweden ===
- Lysekil Refinery (Preem), 220,000 bbl/d (35,000 m^{3}/d)
- Preemraff Gothenburg Refinery (Preem), 78,000 bbl/d (12,400 m^{3}/d)
- Nynäshamn Refinery (Nynas), 90,000 bbl/d (14,000 m^{3}/d)
- Göteborg Refinery (Keele Oy), 70,000 bbl/d (11,000 m^{3}/d)

=== Switzerland ===
- Cressier Refinery (Varo Energy Holding SA, joint venture of Vitol and Carlyle International Energy Partners (CIEP), since 2014), Neuchâtel, 68,000 bbl/d (10,800 m^{3}/d) – shutdown 2011 – January 2012; re-started July 2013; being partially converted to use natural gas as of 2015
- Collombey-Muraz Refinery (Raffinerie du Sud-Ouest S.A.), formerly 46,000 bbl/d (7,300 m^{3}/d) – online 1963; closed March 2015

=== Ukraine ===
- Halychyna Refinery (Pryvat), 40,000 bbl/d (6,400 m^{3}/d)
- Kherson Refinery (Alliance), 36,000 bbl/d (5,700 m^{3}/d)
- Kremenchuk Refinery (Ukrtatnafta), 368,500 bbl/d (58,590 m^{3}/d)
- LINOS Refinery (TNK-BP), Lisichansk, formerly 160,000 bbl/d (25,000 m^{3}/d) – started operations 1976; upgraded 1979–87, 1994, 2001, 2003, 2004–05 and 2007; mothballed March 2012
- Lviv Oil Research & Refinery – defunct 2009
- Naftokhimik Prykarpattya (Pryvat), 39,000 bbl/d (6,200 m^{3}/d)
- Odesa Refinery (Lukoil), Odessa, formerly 56,000 bbl/d (8,900 m^{3}/d) Nelson Complexity Index 3.9 – began operations 1937; upgraded 1992 and 2004; 2005–08 closed temporarily for refurbishment; mothballed 2010

=== United Kingdom ===
England

- Coryton Refinery (Petroplus, since June 2007), Essex, Thames Estuary, formerly 220,000 bbl/d (35,000 m^{3}/d) Nelson Complexity Index 12 – commissioned 1953; upgraded 2003; closed June 2012 and coverted to an import terminal
- Fawley Refinery (ExxonMobil), 270,000 bbl/d (43,000 m^{3}/d)
- Harwich Refinery (Haltermann Carless), 500,000 tonnes/year
- Heysham Refinery (Shell), formerly 2 million tonnes/year – closed 1976
- Humber Refinery (Phillips 66), 221,000 bbl/d (35,100 m^{3}/d) Nelson Complexity Index 11.8 (was 11.6)
- Kent Refinery (BP), formerly 4 million tonnes/year – closed 1982
- Lindsey Oil Refinery (Prax Group), 200,000 bbl/d (32,000 m^{3}/d) – built 1968
- Port Clarence Teesside Refinery (Petroplus, since 2000), Teesside, formerly 117,000 bbl/d (18,600 m^{3}/d) – commissioned 1966; debottlenecked 1981; upgraded 1996; closed 2009, now a crude oil reception, storage, and trans-shipment installation
- Shell Haven Refinery (Shell), formerly 6,000 tonnes/day – closed December 1999, transitioned to a terminal
- Stanlow Refinery (Essar Oil), 296,000 bbl/d (47,100 m^{3}/d)

Scotland

- Grangemouth Refinery (Petroineos, a joint venture of Ineos, since 2005, and PetroChina), formerly 210,000 bbl/d (33,000 m^{3}/d) – to be closed and converted to storage terminal, second quarter 2025

Wales

- Llandarcy Oil Refinery (BP), formerly 200,000 bbl/d (32,000 m^{3}/d) – closed 1998
- Esso Refinery, Milford Haven (Esso), formerly 4.5 million tonnes/year – closed 1983
- Gulf Refinery, Milford Haven (Petroplus International N.V., Petroplus UK Holding Limited, since September 1998), formerly 115,000 bbl/d (18,300 m^{3}/d) – 5.75 million tons per year; opened 1968; closed and dismantled December 1997; now a Dragon LNG Terminal
- Milford Haven Refinery (Murco), formerly 135,000 bbl/d (21,500 m^{3}/d) – closed November 2014
- Pembroke Refinery (Valero), 270,000 bbl/d (43,000 m^{3}/d), Nelson Complexity Index 11.6

== North & Central America ==
=== Aruba ===
- Aruba Refinery (Valero Refining Company-Aruba N.V., Valero, since February 2004), San Nicolas, formerly 235,000 bbl/d (37,400 m^{3}/d) – commissioned 1929; shut down from 1985–90; mothballed 2009 and again in 2012, to be converted to terminal in 2012; bought by Citgo and reopened now permanently closed

=== Bahamas ===
- BORCO Refinery (Bahamas Oil Refining Company), Freeport, formerly 125,000 bbl/d (19,900 m^{3}/d) – commissioned 1970; closed 1985, now an oil terminal

=== Canada ===
==== General information ====
As of 2018, Canadian refineries collectively had the capacity to process 1.6 million bbl/d (250,000 m^{3}/d) of crude oil and produce 1.9 million bbl/d (300,000 m^{3}/d) of petroleum products.

==== Alberta ====
- Strathcona Refinery (Imperial Oil (ExxonMobil)), Sherwood Park, Strathcona County, 191,000 bbl/d (30,400 m^{3}/d) - upgraded 2001
- Scotford Refinery (Shell Oil Company/Canadian Natural Resources), Strathcona County, 110,000 bbl/d (17,000 m^{3}/d) – upgraded 2004–06
- Edmonton Refinery (Suncor Energy), Sherwood Park, Strathcona County, 146,000 bbl/d (23,200 m^{3}/d) – opened 1951
- Sturgeon Refinery (North West Redwater (NWR) Partnership), Redwater, Sturgeon County, 129,000 bbl/d (20,500 m^{3}/d) of bitumen – engineering began 2011–13, construction began 2015
- Husky Lloydminster Refinery (Husky Energy), Lloydminster, Vermilion River, 30,000 bbl/d (4,800 m^{3}/d) of asphalt

==== British Columbia ====
- Burnaby Refinery (Parkland Fuel), Burnaby, 55,000 bbl/d (8,700 m^{3}/d)
- Prince George Refinery (Tidewater), Prince George, 12,000 bbl/d (1,900 m^{3}/d)

==== New Brunswick ====
- Irving Oil Refinery (Irving Oil), Saint John, 320,000 bbl/d (51,000 m^{3}/d)

==== Newfoundland and Labrador ====
- North Atlantic Refinery (North Atlantic Refining), Come by Chance, 130,000 bbl/d (21,000 m^{3}/d)

==== Nova Scotia ====
- Dartmouth Refinery (Imperial Oil (ExxonMobil), since 1989), formerly 82,000 bbl/d (13,000 m^{3}/d) - began production 1918; upgraded 2001-03; closed down 2013, converted to terminal

==== Ontario ====
- Nanticoke Refinery (Imperial Oil (ExxonMobil)), Nanticoke, 112,000 bbl/d (17,800 m^{3}/d)
- Sarnia Refinery (Imperial Oil (ExxonMobil)), Sarnia, 121,000 bbl/d (19,200 m^{3}/d)
- Shell Corunna Refinery (Shell Canada), Corunna, 85,000 bbl/d (13,500 m^{3}/d)
- Clarkson Refinery (HollyFrontier), Mississauga, 15,600 bbl/d (2,480 m^{3}/d)
- Sarnia Refinery (Suncor Energy Products, Inc.), Sarnia-Lambton, 85,000 bbl/d (13,500 m^{3}/d) – opened 1952
- Oakville Refinery (Suncor), Oakville, formerly 90,000 bbl/d (14,000 m^{3}/d) – commissioned 1958; closed 2005
- Sarnia Refinery (Shell), Sarnia, 76,000 bbl/d (12,100 m^{3}/d) – commissioned 1952; upgrade started 2004 and cancelled July 2008

==== Quebec ====
- Montreal Refinery (Suncor Energy), East Montreal, 137,000 bbl/d (21,800 m^{3}/d) – opened 1955
- Jean-Gaulin Refinery (Valero), Lévis, 235,000 bbl/d (37,400 m^{3}/d)
- Montreal Refinery (Shell Canada Limited), Montreal East, formerly 130,000 bbl/d (21,000 m^{3}/d) – upgraded 2004–06; closed 2010 and originally was to be made into a terminal but was dismantled and demolished in 2012–14

==== Saskatchewan ====
- Co-op Refinery Complex (FCL), Regina, 145,000 bbl/d (23,100 m^{3}/d)
- Moose Jaw Refinery (Gibson Energy), Moose Jaw, 22,000 bbl/d (3,500 m^{3}/d)

=== Cuba ===
- Nico López Refinery (Cupet), Havana, 122,000 bbl/d (19,400 m^{3}/d)
- Hermanos Díaz Refinery (Cupet), Santiago, 102,500 bbl/d (16,300 m^{3}/d)
- Cienfuegos Refinery (Cupet), 76,000 bbl/d (12,100 m^{3}/d)

=== Curaçao ===
- Isla Refinery (Government of Curaçao, since 1985), 320,000 bbl/d (51,000 m^{3}/d)

=== Costa Rica ===
- Puerto Limón Refinery (Recope), formerly 25,000 bbl/d (4,000 m^{3}/d) – start-up 1967; not operational since 2011

=== Dominican Republic ===
- Haina Refinery (REFIDOMSA), 33,000 bbl/d (5,200 m^{3}/d) - start-up 1973

=== El Salvador ===
- Refinería Petrolera De Acajutla RASA (Petróleos de El Salvador (Trafigura), Puma Energy since 2011-12), formerly 22,000 bbl/d (3,500 m^{3}/d) – construction began 1960; start-up 1962; closed October 2012, to become a terminal

=== Guatemala ===
- Puerto Barrios Refinery (Texaco), formerly 12,500 bbl/d (1,990 m^{3}/d) – out of use
- La Libertad Refinery (Perenco)

=== Honduras ===
- Puerto Cortés Refinery (REFTEXA - Texaco), formerly 16,000 bbl/d (2,500 m^{3}/d) – closed

=== Jamaica ===
- Kingston Refinery (PetroJam & PDVSA), 50,000 bbl/d (7,900 m^{3}/d)

=== Martinique ===
- Fort de France Refinery (SARA), 16,500 bbl/d (2,620 m^{3}/d)

=== Mexico ===
- Miguel Hidalgo Tula Refinery (Pemex), Tula, Hidalgo, 320,000 bbl/d (51,000 m^{3}/d)
- Minatitlan Refinery (Pemex), Minatitlan, Veracruz, 170,000 bbl/d (27,000 m^{3}/d)
- Cadereyta Refinery (Pemex), Cadereyta Jiménez, Nuevo León, 292,000 bbl/d (46,400 m^{3}/d)
- Salamanca Refinery (Pemex), Salamanca, Guanajuato, 236,000 bbl/d (37,500 m^{3}/d)
- Francisco I. Madero Refinery (Pemex), Ciudad Madero, Tamaulipas, 190,000 bbl/d (30,000 m^{3}/d)
- Salina Cruz Refinery (Pemex), Salina Cruz, Oaxaca, 320,000 bbl/d (51,000 m^{3}/d)
- Dos Bocas Refinery (Pemex), Paraiso, Tabasco, 340,000 bbl/d (54,000 m^{3}/d)

=== Nicaragua ===
- Cuesta Del Plomo Managua Refinery (Trafigura Beheer BV, Puma Energy since 2011-12), 22,000 bbl/d (3,500 m^{3}/d) - start-up 1962

=== Trinidad and Tobago ===
- Pointe-à-Pierre Refinery (Petrotrin, previously Texaco), formerly 170,000 bbl/d (27,000 m^{3}/d) – closed November 2018

=== United States ===
As of January 2024, there were 132 operating oil refineries in the United States with an atmospheric crude oil distillation capacity of 18,374,628 barrels per calendar day, according to the U.S. Energy Information Administration (EIA).

==== Alabama ====
- Atmore Refinery (Goodway Refining LLC), Atmore, 3,500 bbl/d (560 m^{3}/d)
- Saraland Refinery (Vertex Energy), Saraland, 88,000 bbl/d (14,000 m^{3}/d)
- Tuscaloosa Refinery (Hunt Refining Company), Tuscaloosa, 72,000 bbl/d (11,400 m^{3}/d)

==== Alaska ====
- Kenai Refinery (Marathon Petroleum Company), Kenai, 68,000 bbl/d (10,800 m^{3}/d)
- North Pole Refinery (Petro Star by Arctic Slope Regional Corporation), North Pole, 21,000 bbl/d (3,300 m^{3}/d)
- North Pole Refinery (Flint Hills Resources LP by Koch Industries), North Pole, formerly 127,459 bbl/d (20,264.4 m^{3}/d) – shut down in 2014
- Prudhoe Bay Crude Oil Topping Unit (Hilcorp), Prudhoe Bay, 6,500 bbl/d (1,030 m^{3}/d)
- Kuparuk Topping Unit (ConocoPhillips), Prudhoe Bay, 15,000 bbl/d (2,400 m^{3}/d)
- Valdez Refinery (Petro Star by Arctic Slope Regional Corporation), Valdez, 55,000 bbl/d (8,700 m^{3}/d)

==== Arkansas ====
- El Dorado Refinery (Delek), El Dorado, 83,000 bbl/d (13,200 m^{3}/d) Nelson Complexity Index 10.2
- Smackover Refinery (Cross Oil Refining & Marketing Inc by Martin Midstream Partners LP), Smackover, 7,700 bbl/d (1,220 m^{3}/d)

==== California ====
- Bakersfield Refinery (GCEH), Bakersfield, formerly 66,000 bbl/d (10,500 m^{3}/d) – conversion to 17,000 bbl/d (2,700 m^{3}/d) of renewable diesel projected to be completed by 2nd half of 2022
- Bakersfield Refinery (Kern Oil & Refining Co.), Bakersfield, 26,000 bbl/d (4,100 m^{3}/d)
- Bakersfield Refinery (San Joaquin Refining Co.), Bakersfield, 15,000 bbl/d (2,400 m^{3}/d)
- Benicia Refinery (Valero), Benicia, 170,000 bbl/d (27,000 m^{3}/d), Nelson Complexity Index 16.1 – may be "idled, restructured, or cease refining operations" by the end of April 2026
- El Segundo Refinery (Chevron), El Segundo, 269,000 bbl/d (42,800 m^{3}/d)
- Los Angeles Refinery (Marathon), Carson and Wilmington, 365,000 bbl/d (58,000 m^{3}/d) (the formerly separate Carson and Wilmington refineries began reporting as one entity in 2019) Nelson Complexity Index 12.07
- Los Angeles Refinery (Phillips 66), Wilmington and Carson, formerly 139,000 bbl/d (22,100 m^{3}/d), Nelson Complexity Index 14.3 – planned closure, second quarter 2025
- Martinez/Avon Refinery (Marathon), Martinez, formerly 166,000 bbl/d (26,400 m^{3}/d) – conversion to 48,000 bbl/d (7,600 m^{3}/d) of renewable diesel projected to be completed by late 2023
- Martinez Refinery (PBF Energy), Martinez, 157,000 bbl/d (25,000 m^{3}/d), Nelson Complexity Index 16.1
- Paramount Refinery (World Energy), Paramount, formerly 50,000 bbl/d (7,900 m^{3}/d) – idle, March 12, 2021
- Richmond Refinery (Chevron), Richmond, 245,271 bbl/d (38,995.0 m^{3}/d)
- San Francisco Refinery (Phillips 66), Rodeo and Arroyo Grande, formerly 120,200 bbl/d (19,110 m^{3}/d), Nelson Complexity Index 13.3 – the 200-mile-apart, but connected, Rodeo and Santa Maria/Arroyo Grande refineries began reporting as one entity in 2017. Intended to be closed and converted to renewable fuels plant by 2024
- Santa Maria Asphalt Refinery (Greka Energy), Santa Maria, 9,500 bbl/d (1,510 m^{3}/d)
- South Gate Refinery (World Oil Corp., formerly Lunday-Thagard Co.), South Gate, 8,500 bbl/d (1,350 m^{3}/d)
- Torrance Refinery (PBF Energy), Torrance, 166,000 bbl/d (26,400 m^{3}/d), Nelson Complexity Index 13.8 (was 14.9)
- Wilmington Asphalt Refinery (Valero), Wilmington, 6,300 bbl/d (1,000 m^{3}/d)
- Wilmington Refinery (Valero), Wilmington, 135,000 bbl/d (21,500 m^{3}/d), Nelson Complexity Index 15.9
- Talley Asphalt Products Refinery, Kern, 1,700 bbl/d (270 m^{3}/d) – started operating in 2021
- Cenco Refinery (Cenco Refining), formerly 50,000 bbl/d (7,900 m^{3}/d) – upgraded 1981; closed 1995

==== Colorado ====
- Commerce City Refinery (Suncor Energy (U.S.A.) Inc., since 2003–05), Commerce City, 98,000 bbl/d (15,600 m^{3}/d) – three plants at two refineries

==== Delaware ====
- Delaware City Refinery (Delaware City Refining Company LLC, PBF Energy Partners, since June 2010), Delaware City, 180,000 bbl/d (29,000 m^{3}/d) Nelson Complexity Index 13.6 – commissioned 1956; closed down 2009; re-started and upgraded in 2011

==== Georgia ====
- Savannah Asphalt Refinery (Nustar Asphalt Refining LLC by NuStar Energy), Savannah, 28,000 bbl/d (4,500 m^{3}/d)

==== Hawaii ====
- Kapolei Refinery (Par Hawaii Refining, LLC, Par Pacific Holdings, since 2018), Ewa Beach (Kapolei), 93,500 bbl/d (14,870 m^{3}/d) – single remaining refinery in Hawaii now includes refining assets previously owned and operated as "Hawaii Refinery" by Chevron Corporation with up to 54,000 bbl/d (8,600 m^{3}/d) in additional capacity; closed briefly in 2013 and was to be converted to a terminal; re-opened after sale to Hawaii Pacific Energy, LLC, Par Petroleum Corporation

==== Illinois ====
- Lemont Refinery (Citgo), Lemont, 177,000 bbl/d (28,100 m^{3}/d) Nelson Complexity Index 12.85
- Joliet Refinery (ExxonMobil), Joliet, 275,000 bbl/d (43,700 m^{3}/d)
- Robinson Refinery (Marathon Petroleum Company), Robinson, 253,000 bbl/d (40,200 m^{3}/d)
- Wood River Refinery (WRB Refining LP by Phillips 66/Cenovus, Roxana, 346,000 bbl/d (55,000 m^{3}/d) Nelson Complexity Index 11.0 (was 12.5)

==== Indiana ====
- Whiting Refinery (BP Products Inc by BP), Whiting, 435,000 bbl/d (69,200 m^{3}/d) Nelson Complexity Index 9.73
- Mount Vernon Refinery (Countrymark Co-op), Mount Vernon, 35,000 bbl/d (5,600 m^{3}/d)

==== Kansas ====
- Coffeyville Refinery (Coffeyville Resources by CVR Energy), Coffeyville, 115,000 bbl/d (18,300 m^{3}/d) Nelson Complexity Index 12.9
- El Dorado Refinery (HF Sinclair), El Dorado, 135,000 bbl/d (21,500 m^{3}/d) Nelson Complexity Index 11.8
- McPherson Refinery (CHS Inc.), McPherson, 100,000 bbl/d (16,000 m^{3}/d)

==== Kentucky ====
- Catlettsburg Refinery (Marathon Petroleum Company), Catlettsburg, 300,000 bbl/d (48,000 m^{3}/d)
- Somerset Refinery (Continental Refining Company), Somerset, 5,500 bbl/d (870 m^{3}/d)

==== Louisiana ====
- Alliance Refinery (Phillips 66), Belle Chasse, formerly 253,600 bbl/d (40,320 m^{3}/d) Nelson Complexity Index 12.0 – closed 2021
- Baton Rouge Refinery (ExxonMobil), Baton Rouge, 522,500 bbl/d (83,070 m^{3}/d)
- Chalmette Refinery (PBF Energy), Chalmette, 185,000 bbl/d (29,400 m^{3}/d) Nelson Complexity Index 13.0 (was 12.7)
- Convent Refinery (Shell Oil Company), Convent, formerly 240,000 bbl/d (38,000 m^{3}/d) – closed November 2020; conversion into a low-carbon alternative energy facility considered
- Cotton Valley Refinery (Calumet Specialty Products Partners), Cotton Valley, 13,020 bbl/d (2,070 m^{3}/d)
- Garyville Refinery (Marathon Petroleum Company), Garyville, 617,000 bbl/d (98,100 m^{3}/d)
- Krotz Springs Refinery (Delek), Krotz Springs, 80,000 bbl/d (13,000 m^{3}/d)
- Lake Charles Refinery (Calcasieu Refining), Lake Charles, 135,500 bbl/d (21,540 m^{3}/d)
- Lake Charles Refinery (Citgo), Lake Charles, 455,000 bbl/d (72,300 m^{3}/d)
- Lake Charles Refinery (Pelican Refining), Lake Charles, 150,000 bbl/d (24,000 m^{3}/d)
- Lake Charles Refinery (Phillips 66), Westlake, 264,000 bbl/d (42,000 m^{3}/d) Nelson Complexity Index 11.1 (was 11.2)
- Meraux Refinery (Valero), Meraux, 135,000 bbl/d (21,500 m^{3}/d) Nelson Complexity Index 9.7
- Norco Refinery (Shell Oil Company), Norco, 235,000 bbl/d (37,400 m^{3}/d)
- Port Allen Refinery (Placid Refining), Port Allen, 60,000 bbl/d (9,500 m^{3}/d)
- Princeton Refinery (Calumet Specialty Products Partners), Princeton, 8,300 bbl/d (1,320 m^{3}/d)
- Shreveport Refinery (Calumet Specialty Products Partners), Shreveport, 57,000 bbl/d (9,100 m^{3}/d)
- St. Charles Refinery (Valero), Norco, 340,000 bbl/d (54,000 m^{3}/d) Nelson Complexity Index 16.0
- St. Rose Refinery (Shell Oil Company), St. Rose, 45,000 bbl/d (7,200 m^{3}/d)

==== Michigan ====
- Marathon Detroit Refinery (Marathon Petroleum Company), Detroit, 144,000 bbl/d (22,900 m^{3}/d)
- Erie Refining Company, Bloomingdale, formerly 1,400 bbl/d (220 m^{3}/d) – closed late 1940s
- Fort-Dalo Oil and Refining Company, Bloomingdale, formerly 1,400 bbl/d (220 m^{3}/d) – closed late 1940s
- Midwest Refinery – eventually acquired by and merged with Leonard Refinery below; closed late 1990s
- Northern Oil Refinery, Alma – operated from approximately 1938 – October 1999; cleanup on site began 1992
- Leonard Oil Refinery, Alma (first refinery to produce high, 96-octane gasoline in 1953), formerly 55,000 bbl/d (8,700 m^{3}/d) – operated from 1936–1999; damaged by fire 1992; demolished 2003
- former Wolvertine Refinery, Alma

==== Minnesota ====
- Pine Bend Refinery (Flint Hills Resources by Koch Industries), Rosemount, 375,000 bbl/d (59,600 m^{3}/d)
- St. Paul Park Refinery (Marathon Petroleum Company), St. Paul Park, 105,000 bbl/d (16,700 m^{3}/d) Nelson Complexity Index 11.5

==== Mississippi ====
- Pascagoula Refinery (Chevron), Pascagoula, 330,000 bbl/d (52,000 m^{3}/d) – plans to almost triple its capacity
- Vicksburg Refinery (Ergon), Vicksburg, 26,500 bbl/d (4,210 m^{3}/d)
- Rogerslacy Refinery (Hunt Southland Refining), Sandersville, 10,000 bbl/d (1,600 m^{3}/d)
- Greenville Biodiesel Refinery (Scott Petroleum), capacity 17 Million of Gallons per Year (uses soybean and corn oil)

==== Montana ====
- Billings Refinery (Phillips 66), Billings, 66,000 bbl/d (10,500 m^{3}/d) Nelson Complexity Index 12.4 (was 14.4)
- Billings Refinery (Par Pacific Holdings), Billings, 60,000 bbl/d (9,500 m^{3}/d)
- Calumet Montana Refining (Calumet Specialty Products Partners), Great Falls, 24,500 bbl/d (3,900 m^{3}/d)
- Laurel Refinery (CHS Inc.), Laurel, 59,600 bbl/d (9,480 m^{3}/d)

==== Nevada ====
- Eagle Springs Refinery (Foreland Refining), Ely, 2,192 bbl/d (348.5 m^{3}/d)

==== New Jersey ====
- Bayway Refinery (Phillips 66), Linden, 258,000 bbl/d (41,000 m^{3}/d) Nelson Complexity Index 7.7 (was 8.4)
- Eagle Point Refinery (Sunoco), Westville, formerly 145,000 bbl/d (23,100 m^{3}/d) – closed early 2010
- Paulsboro Asphalt Refinery (Axeon) Paulsboro, formerly 49,000 bbl/d (7,800 m^{3}/d) – closed in 2017
- Paulsboro Refinery (PBF Holding Company LLC, PBF Energy Company LLC, since December 2010) Paulsboro, 160,000 bbl/d (25,000 m^{3}/d) Nelson Complexity Index 13.1 – commissioned 1917
- Perth Amboy Refinery (Chevron), Perth Amboy, formerly 80,000 bbl/d (13,000 m^{3}/d) – closed in 2012
- Port Reading Refinery (Hess), Port Reading, formerly 70,000 bbl/d (11,000 m^{3}/d) – closed in 2013

==== New Mexico ====
- Navajo Refinery (HF Sinclair), Artesia, 100,000 bbl/d (16,000 m^{3}/d) Nelson Complexity Index 11.8
- Bloomfield Refinery (Western Refining), Bloomfield, formerly 16,800 bbl/d (2,670 m^{3}/d) – closed 2012
- Ciniza Refinery (Marathon Petroleum Company), Gallup, formerly 27,000 bbl/d (4,300 m^{3}/d) – closed 2020, being demolished

==== North Dakota ====
- Mandan Refinery (Marathon Petroleum), Mandan, 71,000 bbl/d (11,300 m^{3}/d)
- Dickinson Renewables Facility (Marathon Petroleum), Dickinson, formerly 19,000 bbl/d (3,000 m^{3}/d) – converted to 12,000 bbl/d (1,900 m^{3}/d) renewable diesel plant (using corn, soybean oil, and other organically-derived feedstock) by late 2020

==== Ohio ====
- Canton Refinery (Marathon Petroleum), 100,000 bbl/d (16,000 m^{3}/d)
- Lima Refinery (Cenovus Energy), 175,000 bbl/d (27,800 m^{3}/d)
- Toledo Refinery (Cenovus Energy, since 2022), 160,000 bbl/d (25,000 m^{3}/d) Nelson Complexity Index 10.66
- Toledo Refinery (PBF Energy), 180,000 bbl/d (29,000 m^{3}/d) Nelson Complexity Index 11.0 (was 9.2)

==== Oklahoma ====
- Ardmore Refinery (Valero), Ardmore, 90,000 bbl/d (14,000 m^{3}/d) Nelson Complexity Index 12.1
- Ponca City Refinery (Phillips 66) Ponca City, 217,000 bbl/d (34,500 m^{3}/d) Nelson Complexity Index 8.8
- Tulsa Refinery East & West (HF Sinclair), Tulsa, 125,000 bbl/d (19,900 m^{3}/d) Nelson Complexity Index 14.0
- Wynnewood Refinery (Wynnewood Refining by CVR Energy) Wynnewood, 70,000 bbl/d (11,000 m^{3}/d) Nelson Complexity Index 9.3

==== Pennsylvania ====
- Bradford Refinery (American Refining Group), Bradford, 11,000 bbl/d (1,700 m^{3}/d)
- Marcus Hook Refinery (Sunoco), Marcus Hook, formerly 178,000 bbl/d (28,300 m^{3}/d) – closed December 2011; acquired by Sunoco Logistics in 2012 – converted into hub for storing and processing natural gas liquids (NGLs)
- Philadelphia Refinery (Philadelphia Energy Solutions by Carlyle Group), Philadelphia, formerly 335,000 bbl/d (53,300 m^{3}/d) – closed in June 2019 after explosion
- Trainer Refinery (Monroe Energy by Delta Air Lines), Trainer, 185,000 bbl/d (29,400 m^{3}/d)
- Warren Refinery, United Refining Company, Warren, 70,000 bbl/d (11,000 m^{3}/d)
- Wamsutta Oil Refinery (historical), McClintocksville

==== Tennessee ====
- Memphis Refinery (Valero), Memphis, 195,000 bbl/d (31,000 m^{3}/d) Nelson Complexity Index 7.9

==== Texas ====
- Baytown Refinery (ExxonMobil), Baytown, 560,640 bbl/d (89,135 m^{3}/d) Nelson Complexity Index 13.7
- Big Spring Refinery (Delek), Big Spring, 73,000 bbl/d (11,600 m^{3}/d)
- Beaumont Refinery (ExxonMobil), Beaumont, 630,000 bbl/d (100,000 m^{3}/d)Nelson Complexity Index 9.03
- Borger Refinery (WRB Refining LP by Phillips 66/Cenovus, Borger, 149,000 bbl/d (23,700 m^{3}/d) Nelson Complexity Index 11.6 (was 12.3)
- Buckeye Partners Refinery, Corpus Christi, 60,000 bbl/d (9,500 m^{3}/d) – started operating in 2015
- Corpus Christi Complex (Flint Hills Resources), Corpus Christi, 350,000 bbl/d (56,000 m^{3}/d)
- Corpus Christi Refinery (Citgo), Corpus Christi, 157,500 bbl/d (25,040 m^{3}/d)
- Corpus Christi East & West Refinery (Valero), Corpus Christi, 370,000 bbl/d (59,000 m^{3}/d) Nelson Complexity Index 15.4
- Deer Park Refinery, PEMEX (since 2022), Deer Park, Houston Ship Channel, 330,000 bbl/d (52,000 m^{3}/d) – constructed 1929; upgraded 2011
- El Paso Refinery (Marathon Petroleum), El Paso, 133,000 bbl/d (21,100 m^{3}/d)
- Galveston Bay Refinery (Marathon Petroleum, since 2013), Texas City, 631,000 bbl/d (100,300 m^{3}/d) – 2005 explosion
- Hartree Partners Refinery, Channelview, 45,000 bbl/d (7,200 m^{3}/d) – started operating in 2019
- Houston Refinery (LyondellBasell), Houston, formerly 268,000 bbl/d (42,600 m^{3}/d) – decommissioned February 2025; to be converted into a chemical recycling plant to produce plastic pellets
- Houston Refinery (Valero), Houston, 255,000 bbl/d (40,500 m^{3}/d) Nelson Complexity Index 8.9
- Independent Refinery (Stratnor), Houston, 100,000 bbl/d (16,000 m^{3}/d)
- Kinder Morgan Refinery, Galena Park, 105,000 bbl/d (16,700 m^{3}/d) – started operating in 2015
- McKee Refinery (Valero), Sunray, 200,000 bbl/d (32,000 m^{3}/d) Nelson Complexity Index 9.5
- Nixon Refinery (Blue Dolphin Energy Company) Nixon, 15,000 bbl/d (2,400 m^{3}/d)
- Newton County, Texas Refinery – will process one million tons of wood waste into 65 million gallons of transportation biofuels annually, including sustainable aviation fuel and renewable diesel
- Oneok Refinery, Corpus Christi, 42,500 bbl/d (6,760 m^{3}/d) – started operating in 2017
- Pasadena Refining System (Chevron), Pasadena, 100,000 bbl/d (16,000 m^{3}/d)
- Petromax Refining Refinery, Houston, 25,000 bbl/d (4,000 m^{3}/d) – started opering in 2015
- Port Arthur Refinery (Total, since 1973), Port Arthur, 238,000 bbl/d (37,800 m^{3}/d) – started operations 1936; upgraded 2011, 2013, 2020 and 2022–23
- Port Arthur Refinery (Motiva Enterprises), Port Arthur, 730,000 bbl/d (116,000 m^{3}/d)
- Port Arthur Refinery (Valero), Port Arthur, 435,000 bbl/d (69,200 m^{3}/d) Nelson Complexity Index 12.4
- San Antonio Refinery (Calumet Specialty Products Partners), San Antonio, 21,000 bbl/d (3,300 m^{3}/d)
- Sweeny Refinery (Phillips 66), Sweeny, 265,000 bbl/d (42,100 m^{3}/d) Nelson Complexity Index 13.4 (was 13.2)
- Sullivan Three Rivers Refinery (Valero), Three Rivers, 100,000 bbl/d (16,000 m^{3}/d) Nelson Complexity Index 13.2
- Texas City Refinery (Valero), Texas City, 260,000 bbl/d (41,000 m^{3}/d) Nelson Complexity Index 11.1
- Texas International Terminals Refinery, Galveston, 45,000 bbl/d (7,200 m^{3}/d) – started operating in February 2022
- Tyler Refinery (Delek), Tyler, 75,000 bbl/d (11,900 m^{3}/d)

==== Utah ====
- North Salt Lake Refinery (Big West Oil, a subsidiary of FJ Management), North Salt Lake, 35,000 bbl/d (5,600 m^{3}/d)
- Salt Lake City Refinery (Chevron), Salt Lake City, 55,000 bbl/d (8,700 m^{3}/d)
- Salt Lake City Refinery (Marathon Petroleum), Salt Lake City, 68,000 bbl/d (10,800 m^{3}/d)
- Woods Cross Refinery (HF Sinclair), Woods Cross, 45,000 bbl/d (7,200 m^{3}/d)
- Woods Cross Refinery (Silver Eagle Refining), Woods Cross, 15,000 bbl/d (2,400 m^{3}/d)

==== Virginia ====
- Yorktown Refinery (Western Refining), Yorktown, formerly 70,000 bbl/d (11,000 m^{3}/d) Nelson Complexity Index 11.4 – upgraded 2006–07; mothballed September 2010

==== Washington ====
- Puget Sound Refinery (HF Sinclair), Anacortes, 149,000 bbl/d (23,700 m^{3}/d)
- Marathon Anacortes Refinery (Marathon Petroleum), Anacortes, 119,000 bbl/d (18,900 m^{3}/d)
- Cherry Point Refinery (BP), Blaine, 225,000 bbl/d (35,800 m^{3}/d) Nelson Complexity Index 9.59
- Ferndale Refinery (Phillips 66), Ferndale, 105,000 bbl/d (16,700 m^{3}/d) Nelson Complexity Index 7.7 (was 7.0)
- Tacoma Refinery (Par Pacific Holdings), Tacoma, 42,000 bbl/d (6,700 m^{3}/d)

==== West Virginia ====
- Newell Refinery (Ergon), Newell, 23,500 bbl/d (3,740 m^{3}/d) Nelson Complexity Index 3.84

==== Wisconsin ====
- Superior Refinery (Cenovus Energy), Superior, 49,000 bbl/d (7,800 m^{3}/d)

==== Wyoming ====
- Cheyenne Refinery (HF Sinclair), Cheyenne, formerly 52,000 bbl/d (8,300 m^{3}/d) Nelson Complexity Index 8.9 – converted (2021) to Renewable Diesel Unit (RDU), 6,000 bbl/d (950 m^{3}/d), processes refined soybean oil and animal fats into renewable diesel and small amounts of renewable naphtha
- Douglas Refinery (Genesis Energy), Douglas, 4,500 bbl/d (720 m^{3}/d)
- Evanston Refinery (Silver Eagle Refining), Evanston, 3,000 bbl/d (480 m^{3}/d)
- Newcastle Refinery (Wyoming Refining Company, LLC – a subsidiary of Par Pacific Holdings), Newcastle, 20,000 bbl/d (3,200 m^{3}/d)
- HF Sinclair Parco (HF Sinclair), Sinclair, 94,000 bbl/d (14,900 m^{3}/d)
- Sinclair Casper Refinery (HF Sinclair), Evansville, 30,000 bbl/d (4,800 m^{3}/d)

==== Puerto Rico ====
- Yabucoa Refinery (Shell Chemical Yabucoa, Inc., Shell, since December 2001), formerly 77,000 bbl/d (12,200 m^{3}/d) – commissioned 1971; closed 2009
- Bayamón Refinery (Caribbean Petroleum (Capeco), Puma Energy Caribe LLC, Puma Energy International since 2011), Bayamón/Cataño Free Trade Zone, formerly 48,000 bbl/d (7,600 m^{3}/d) – operations begun 1955; closed 1995–98; closed down after explosion and fire in October 2009, converted to fuel terminal

==== US Virgin Islands ====
- St Croix Refinery (previously HOVENSA, then Limetree Bay Terminals, LLC, Limetree Bay Refining, LLC in early 2016), formerly 350,000 bbl/d (56,000 m^{3}/d), since 2011 – commissioned 1966; upgraded 1974, 1981, 1993 and 2002; closed early 2012; used as storage terminal until 2018, then re-opened as refinery in late 2019; after "oil from the refinery fell from the sky" in February and May 2021, it was shut down in May 2021

== Oceania ==
=== Australia ===
==== New South Wales ====
- Kurnell Refinery (Caltex) Botany Bay, formerly 124,500 bbl/d (19,790 m^{3}/d) – closed 2014, converted to terminal
- Clyde Refinery (Shell Australia, since 1928) Rosehill, Clyde, Sydney, formerly 75,000 bbl/d (11,900 m^{3}/d) – built in early 1920s and opened in 1927; upgraded 2002 and 2005; closed in 2009 and 2012; converted to fuel import terminal 2013
- Matraville Refinery (Total) Matraville, formerly 45,000 bbl/d (7,200 m^{3}/d) – closed 1985

==== Victoria ====
- Geelong Oil Refinery (Vitol, Viva Energy) Corio, Geelong, 120,000 bbl/d (19,000 m^{3}/d) – built 1951; fire in "mogas" plant section in April 2026
- Altona Refinery (ExxonMobil Australia) Altona North, Melbourne, formerly about 75,000 bbl/d (11,900 m^{3}/d) – commissioned August 1961; refinery reduced from two trains to one train between 2000–2004; closed 2021, started to be demolished in September 2025 through 2027, being converted to distribution terminal
- Westernport Refinery (BP) Crib Point, formerly 35,000 bbl/d (5,600 m^{3}/d) – closed 1984

==== Queensland ====
- Bulwer Island Refinery (BP), Bulwer Island, Pinkenba, Brisbane, formerly 102,000 bbl/d (16,200 m^{3}/d) Nelson Complexity Index 7.21 – closed 2015, converted to import terminal
- Lytton Oil Refinery (Ampol), Lytton, Brisbane, 104,000 bbl/d (16,500 m^{3}/d)
- Eromanga Refinery (IOR Energy), Eromanga, 1,200 bbl/d (190 m^{3}/d)

==== South Australia ====
- Port Stanvac Refinery (Mobil Refining Australia Pty Ltd, ExxonMobil) Lonsdale, formerly 100,000 bbl/d (16,000 m^{3}/d) – began operations 1963; expanded 1976; closed mid-2003, demolished 2009

==== Western Australia ====
- Kwinana Oil Refinery (BP), Kwinana, formerly 146,000 bbl/d (23,200 m^{3}/d) Nelson Complexity Index 7.70 – closed 2021, being converted to terminal

=== New Zealand ===
- Marsden Point Oil Refinery (The New Zealand Refining Company Ltd. (BP/ExxonMobil/Aotea Energy Limited/Garlow Management Incorporated/Chevron)), Whangārei Harbour, North Island, formerly 135,000 bbl/d (21,500 m^{3}/d) – opened 1964; upgraded 1986, 2003-05, 2010 and 2015-16; closed 2022, converted to terminal

=== Papua New Guinea ===
- InterOil Refinery, Port Moresby (Puma Energy), 32,500 bbl/d (5,170 m^{3}/d)

== South America ==
=== Argentina ===
- La Plata Refinery (YPF), 189,000 bbl/d (30,000 m^{3}/d)
- Buenos Aires Refinery (Royal Dutch Shell), 110,000 bbl/d (17,000 m^{3}/d)
- Luján de Cuyo Refinery (YPF), 105,500 bbl/d (16,770 m^{3}/d)
- Esso Petrolera Campana Refinery (Exxon), Campana, Buenos Aires, 85,000 bbl/d (13,500 m^{3}/d) - upgraded 2010 and 2013
- San Lorenzo Refinery (Refisan S.A.), 38,000 bbl/d (6,000 m^{3}/d) – started 1938
- Plaza Huincul Refinery (YPF), 37,190 bbl/d (5,913 m^{3}/d) – started 1919
- Campo Duran Refinery (Refinor), 32,000 bbl/d (5,100 m^{3}/d)
- Bahía Blanca Refinery (Petrobras), 28,975 bbl/d (4,606.7 m^{3}/d)
- Avellaneda Refinery (Destilerías Argentinas de Petróleos, DAPSA), 1,300 bbl/d (210 m^{3}/d)

=== Bolivia ===
- Gualberto Villarael Cochabamba Refinery (YPFB), 40,000 bbl/d (6,400 m^{3}/d)
- Guillermo Elder Bell Santa Cruz Refinery (YPFB), 20,000 bbl/d (3,200 m^{3}/d)
- Carlos Montenegro Sucre Refinery (Refisur SA), 3,000 bbl/d (480 m^{3}/d)
- Reficruz Refinery, 2,000 bbl/d (320 m^{3}/d)
- Refinería Oro Negro SA, 2,000 bbl/d (320 m^{3}/d)

=== Brazil ===
- Alberto Pasqualini REFAP Refinery (Petrobras, since December 2010), Porto Alegre, Rio Grande do Sul State, 190,000 bbl/d (30,000 m^{3}/d) Nelson Complexity Index 6.9 – commissioned 1968; upgraded to current capacity in 2006
- RECAP (Petrobras), Mauá, 53,500 bbl/d (8,510 m^{3}/d)
- REPLAN (Petrobras), Paulínia, 434,000 bbl/d (69,000 m^{3}/d)
- Henrique Lage REVAP Refinery (Petrobras), São José dos Campos, 190,000 bbl/d (30,000 m^{3}/d) – online 1978
- RPBC Refinery (Petrobras), Cubatão, 170,000 bbl/d (27,000 m^{3}/d)
- REDUC Refinery (Petrobras), Duque de Caxias, Rio de Janeiro, 242,000 bbl/d (38,500 m^{3}/d) – upgraded 2005
- REMAN Refinery (Petrobras), Manaus, 46,000 bbl/d (7,300 m^{3}/d)
- Lubnor Refinery (Petrobras), Fortaleza, 82,000 bbl/d (13,000 m^{3}/d)
- Gabriel Passos REGAP Refinery (Petrobras), Betim, 45,000 bbl/d (7,200 m^{3}/d) – online 1968
- REPAR Refinery (Petrobras), Araucária, 220,000 bbl/d (35,000 m^{3}/d)
- RLAM Refinery (Petrobras), São Francisco do Conde, 280,000 bbl/d (45,000 m^{3}/d)
- RPCC (Petrobras), Guamaré, 35,000 bbl/d (5,600 m^{3}/d)
- RNEST Refinery (Petrobras), Ipojuca, 100,000 bbl/d (16,000 m^{3}/d)
- COMPERJ Refinery (Petrobras), Itaboraí – under construction
- Refinaria Ipiranga (Refinaria Riograndense), Pelotas, 17,000 bbl/d (2,700 m^{3}/d)
- Refinaria Manguinhos (Manguinhos SA, Grupo Peixoto de Castro/Repsol YPF), Rio de Janeiro, 15,000 bbl/d (2,400 m^{3}/d) – commissioned 1954
- DAX Oil Refinery (Dax-Oil), Camaçari, 2,100 bbl/d (330 m^{3}/d)
- Univen Refinery (Univen Petróleo), Itupeva, 6,900 bbl/d (1,100 m^{3}/d)

=== Chile ===
- BioBio Refinery (Empresa Nacional del Petróleo), 113,000 bbl/d (18,000 m^{3}/d)
- Aconcagua Concon Refinery (Empresa Nacional del Petróleo), 97,650 bbl/d (15,525 m^{3}/d)
- Gregorio Refinery (Empresa Nacional del Petróleo), 14,750 bbl/d (2,345 m^{3}/d)

=== Colombia ===
- Barrancabermeja-Santander Refinery (Ecopetrol) (start-up 1922), 240,000 bbl/d (38,000 m^{3}/d)
- Cartagena Refinery (Reficar S.A.) (start-up 1957), 210,000 bbl/d (33,000 m^{3}/d)
- Hidrocasanare Refinery (start-up 2009), 7,000 bbl/d (1,100 m^{3}/d)
- Apiay Refinery (Ecopetrol), 2,500 bbl/d (400 m^{3}/d)
- Orito Refinery (Ecopetrol), 2,300 bbl/d (370 m^{3}/d)

=== Ecuador ===
- Esmeraldas Refinery (Petroecuador) (start-up 1978), 110,000 bbl/d (17,000 m^{3}/d)
- La Libertad Refinery (Petroecuador), 45,000 bbl/d (7,200 m^{3}/d)
- Shushufindi Refinery (Petroecuador), 20,000 bbl/d (3,200 m^{3}/d)

=== Paraguay ===
- Villa Elisa Refinery (Petropar), 7,500 bbl/d (1,190 m^{3}/d)

=== Peru ===
- Refineria La Pampilla "Relapasa" (Repsol, since 1996), Lima, 102,000 bbl/d (16,200 m^{3}/d) – 5 million tons per year; upgraded 2004
- Refinería de Talara (Petroperú) with FCC unit, 65,000 bbl/d (10,300 m^{3}/d) – start-up 1917
- Refinería Iquitos Loreto (Petroperú), 12,000 bbl/d (1,900 m^{3}/d) – start-up 1982
- Refinería Conchan (Petroperú), 15,000 bbl/d (2,400 m^{3}/d) – start-up 1961
- Refinería Pucallpa (Maple Gas), 3,250 bbl/d (517 m^{3}/d)
- Refinería El Milagro (Petroperú), 1,500 bbl/d (240 m^{3}/d) – start-up 1994
- Refinería Shiviyacu (Pluspetrol), 2,000 bbl/d (320 m^{3}/d) – start-up 1950

=== Suriname ===
- Staatsolie Refinery (Staatsolie), 15,000 bbl/d (2,400 m^{3}/d)

=== Uruguay ===
- La Teja Refinery (ANCAP) (start-up 1937), 50,000 bbl/d (7,900 m^{3}/d)

=== Venezuela ===
- Paraguana Refinery Complex (CRP) (PDVSA), 955,000 bbl/d (151,800 m^{3}/d) – start-up 1997
  - Amuay Refinery (CRP) (PDVSA), 635,000 bbl/d (101,000 m^{3}/d) – start-up 1950
  - Cardón Refinery (CRP) (PDVSA), 305,000 bbl/d (48,500 m^{3}/d) – start-up 1949
  - Bajo Grande Refinery (CRP) (PDVSA), 16,000 bbl/d (2,500 m^{3}/d) – start-up 1956
- Puerto La Cruz refinery (PDVSA), 200,000 bbl/d (32,000 m^{3}/d) – start-up 1948
- El Palito Refinery (PDVSA), 140,000 bbl/d (22,000 m^{3}/d) – start-up 1954
- San Roque Refinery (PDVSA), 5,200 bbl/d (830 m^{3}/d)
- Upgraders (Extra Heavy Oil Joint Ventures with PDVSA at Jose)
  - Petro San Felix, originally Petrozuata (PDVSA), 140,000 bbl/d (22,000 m^{3}/d) – start-up 2000
  - Petropiar (PDVSA and Chevron), originally Ameriven (Phillips 66, Texaco and PDVSA), 190,000 bbl/d (30,000 m^{3}/d) – start-up 2004
  - Petrocedeño, originally Sincor (TotalEnergies, Equinor (prev. Statoil), and PDVSA), 180,000 bbl/d (29,000 m^{3}/d) – start-up 2001
  - Petromonagas (PDVSA, Rosneft), originally Cerro Negro (ExxonMobil, Aral AG, and PDVSA), 120,000 bbl/d (19,000 m^{3}/d) – start-up 2001

== See also ==
- Downstream (petroleum industry)
- List of oil pipelines
- List of natural gas pipelines
- List of oil refineries in India
