= Ufa Refinery =

Ufa Refinery refers to an oil refinery facility in the Russian city of Ufa, which may be the following:

- Bashneft-Ufaneftekhim, established in 1957
- Bashneft – Novoil, began in 1951
- Ufimsky refinery plant, founded in 1937
