= Billings Refinery (Par Pacific) =

Coordinates: 45°48′42″N 108°26′02″W

The Billings Refinery is an American oil refinery located in Billings, Montana, owned and operated by Par Pacific Holdings which took over operations from ExxonMobil on June 1, 2023. ExxonMobil previously announced on October 20, 2022, that it would sell the refinery to Par Pacific with the sale expected to complete in the second quarter of 2023.

The complex is capable of refining 62,000 barrels (9,900 m^{3}) of crude oil per day.

== See also ==
- List of oil refineries
