= Calumet Montana Refining =

Oil refinery in Great Falls, Montana, US

Coordinates: 47°31′26″N 111°17′26″W

The Calumet Montana Refining is an oil refinery located in Great Falls, Montana. The refinery is currently owned and operated by Calumet Specialty Products Partners, L.P.

== See also ==
- List of oil refineries
