= Engen refinery =

Crude oil refinery in South Africa

The Engen refinery is a South African oil refinery in the eThekwini Metropolitan Municipality. It is owned by Engen Petroleum and operated from 1954 until a fire damaged it in 2020.

== Description ==
The crude oil refinery is situated in Wentworth, KwaZulu-Natal (Durban), formerly operated by Engen Petroleum. It produced 120,000 barrels per day and while operational, was the second largest crude oil refinery in Durban, supplying about 17% of the nation's fuel.

The refinery is located in the centre of a residential area. The area around the refineries is colloquially known as "cancer valley" due to the provenience of cancers in the population. Leukaemia rates are 24 times greater than the national average. A 2002 study of the Settlers Primary School next to the refinery found hat 52% of the pupils suffered from asthma.

== History ==
The refinery has been in operation since 1954, making it the oldest refinery in South Africa.

After Engen used the 1993 Regulation of Gatherings Act to ban protests outside the refinery, rights group the Right2Know Campaign took action in the High Court to prohibit such bans.

On 4 December 2020, an explosion at the refinery injured seven people. By April 2021, the refinery had remained closed since the blast. In 2021, Engen announced plans to convert the refinery into a storage facility. In March 2023, those plans were restated.

== See also ==
- List of oil refineries
- Cancer Alley
