= Cartagena Refinery =

Oil refinery in Cartagena, Colombia

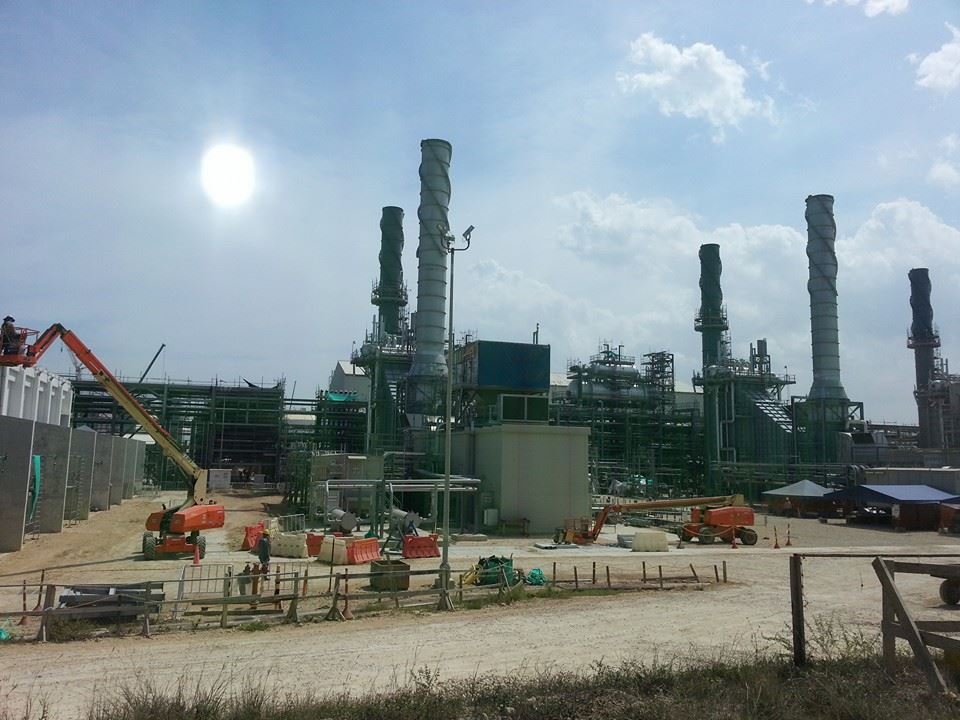
- Reficar industrial complex
- Interactive map of Cartagena Refinery
- Location: Cartagena, Colombia; 10°18′54″N 75°29′50″W

Refinery details
- Operator: Refineria de Cartagena S.A.
- Owner: Ecopetrol
- Opened: 1956
- Capacity: 210.000 barrels per day (33.3873 m^{3}/d)
- Refining units: crude units, visbreaking units, fluid catalytic cracker, light products plants, polymerization plants, amine plants, sulfur plants, impurities treatment plants

The Cartagena Refinery is an oil refinery in Cartagena, Colombia. It is operated by Refineria de Cartagena S.A. (Reficar), a subsidiary of Ecopetrol.

== History ==
The refinery was built by Intercol in 1956 and purchased by Ecopetrol in 1976.

== Technical features ==
The refinery has a capacity of 75 thousand barrels per day (11.9×10^{3} m^{3}/d). By 2013, the capacity will be increased to 165 thousand barrels per day (26.2×10^{3} m^{3}/d). The refinery consists of crude units, visbreaking units, fluid catalytic cracker, light products plants, polymerization plants, amine plants, sulfur plants, and impurities treatment plants. By 2023 its oil production increased to 210 thousand barrels per day (33×10^{3} m^{3}/d).

== See also ==
- List of oil refineries
