= Billings Refinery (Phillips 66) =

Phillips 66 oil refinery located in Billings, Montana

Coordinates: 45°46′49″N 108°29′25″W

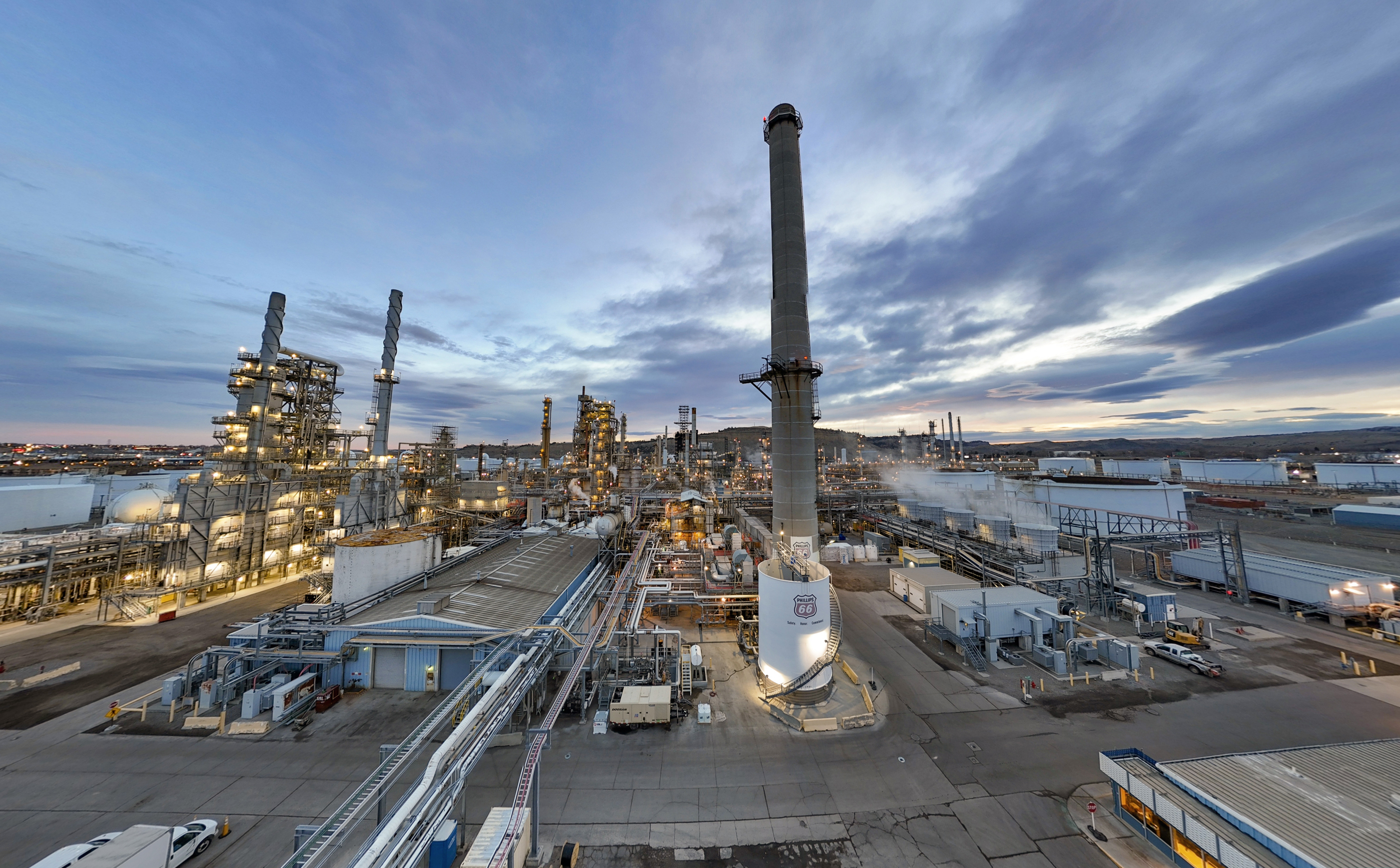
The refinery in Billings

The Billings Refinery is an oil refinery located in Billings, Montana. The refinery is currently owned and operated by Phillips 66. Completed in 1947, the refinery covers 720 acres (290 ha). It is capable of producing 450 million gallons of gasoline per year.

== See also ==
- List of oil refineries
