= Lviv Oil Research & Refinery =

Former oil refinery in Lviv, Ukraine

- Native name: Львівський дослідний нафтомаслозавод
- Type: Open joint-stock company
- Industry: Chemical industry
- Founded: 1896
- Founder: Baron, Val, Lansberg
- Fate: 2009
- Headquarters: 207 Khmelnitsky Boulevard, Shevchenkivsky District, City of Lviv, Lviv Oblast, 79024, Ukraine
- Products: gasoline, diesel fuel, bitumen, oil bitumen, hydrofluid, tars, distillate, lubricating and cooling liquids, fuel oil, lubricants, kerosene
- Number of employees: 195 (2013)

Lviv Oil Research & Refinery is a defunct Ukrainian oil refining enterprise that operated in Lviv from 1896 to 2009.

The enterprise was established in 1896. It was expanded in 1920 with the creation of a new factory attached to the old one, and over the following years leading up to the Invasion of Poland there were more upgrades to the plant. After the establishment of an independent Ukraine in 1991, it became a joint stock company producing over 30 types of oil under the trademark "Olvit". However, it was liquidated in 2009 by a local court because of the serious environmental problems caused by it. Of note was the acid tar that had accumulated from the plant into nearby ponds, which were classified as second-class hazardous waste and contaminated the local area. While the ponds remained a serious hazard afterwards, in 2019, it was deemed that the buildings of the plant itself were safe for use. In April 2019, the Lviv City Council initiated a public discussion for a development plan for the former site of the plant, which was approved by the council in June 2019. The plan, which was stated to take 10 years, would entirely restructure the plant for residential and administrative use.

== History ==
It first started operations in 1896 under the owners named Lansberg and Val. At the time, the enterprise produced refined oils, gasoline, diesel fuel, and candles. The site expanded with the creation of a new factory attached to the original one in 1920, which was financed by Polish banks for the oil industry and earth gases. The site was then restructured, which upgraded the facility from a smaller setup to one that could directly process crude oil. In 1931, a Foster-Wheeler installation was built at the site, and storage infrastructure was constructed. In 1932, emulsion for the chemical industry began, and two years later, in 1934 a dewaxing unit was installed. The plant was nationalised in 1939, just before the Invasion of Poland. The area was then annexed into the Soviet Union, and following the collapse of the Soviet Union itself in 1991, in 1994 the enterprise became a joint stock company. At the time, its production line had an atmospheric-vacuum unit, motor oil production, plastic lubricant production, and other items. It was selling over 30 types of oil for all types of machinery and equipment under the trademark "Olvit". However, over time, the plant's net income fell, and by 2007, it had fallen to 4.13 million hryvnias in net revenue. In the final years before its closure, around 200 people worked at the plant.

In April 2009, a local court in Lviv decided to liquidate the enterprise and arrest the company's assets. The reason for the liquidation was the serious environmental problem created by the enterprise. Between the 1970s and 1980s, the plant accumulated over 200,000 cubic metres of acid tar in ponds, with the ponds having a sulfuric acid concentration of up to 85%, which led to them being classified as second-class hazardous waste just after radioactive materials. Starting in 2004, it was also noticed that there was leakage of filtrate containing sulfuric acid from the ponds, which led to contamination in rivers, bodies of water, and wells surrounding the plant. Despite the plant being liquidated in 2009, it was still a serious hazard afterwards, with the State Environmental Inspection in Lviv Oblast arguing in court that the plant had caused 72 million hryvnias in ecological damage in 2013, but the court rejected the claim. In January 2016, a significant leakage event happened from the ponds, which flooded several kilometers of the surrounding forest and contaminated the water of nearby villages. Experts found that the phenol levels in water runoff exceeded safety limits by 1,500 times.

In April 2019, the Lviv City Council initiated a public discussion for a development plan for the former site of the plant. A study had found that the plant buildings had elevated radiation levels that would require some measures, but that there was no deviation in soil or air quality. The Lviv Oblast Department of Ecology and Natural Resources confirmed that the buildings of the plant itself were safe to use. On 20 June 2019, the council voted in favor of the development plan. The plan provided that the plant would be restructured for an 8-storey administrative and office building with a parking garage, a residential complex for 1,360 new residents, a lyceum with a kindergarten, a hotel complex, another administrative building, and a public amenity complex. It was announced that the plan would require 10 years for implementation.

== See also ==
- List of oil refineries
