= Campo Durán =

Coordinates: 22°14′S 63°42′W

- Municipality and village
- Interactive map of Campo Durán
- Country: Argentina
- Province: Salta Province

Population (568 (2001))
  - Total: 568
- Time zone: UTC−3 (ART)

Campo Durán is a village and rural municipality in Salta Province in northwestern Argentina. There is a nearby oil and gas field of the same name just northeast of the village operated by Tecpetrol.
