= Bashneft-Ufaneftekhim =

Oil refinery located in Ufa, Russia

- Company type: Public
- Traded as: MICEX
- Industry: Oil refining
- Predecessor: Chernikov oil refinery Ufimsky petrochemical Plant
- Founded: 1957
- Headquarters: Ufa, Bashkortostan
- Area served: Ufa, Bashkortostan
- Products: Oil and hydrocarbon fuel
- Parent: Bashneft

Bashneft-Ufaneftekhim is a large oil refinery located in Ufa, Russia, founded in 1957 by Chernikov. It specializes in the refining of several hydrocarbons, such as West Siberian oil, a high-sulfur oil blend from the Arlanskoye field, and gas condensate. The refinery produces various grades of fuel and petrochemicals.

Bashneft-Ufaneftekhim provides fuel and gas catalysis and aromatic hydrocarbon production. The refinery operates coking, hydrocracking, catalytic cracking, de-asphalting, visbreaking, and bitumen technology units.

== Products ==
The plant produces almost sixty types of products, including gasoline, fuel oil, diesel fuel, liquefied gases, and aromatic hydrocarbons.

== History ==
In November 1954, the Chernikov Oil Refinery was founded in the city of Chernikovsk. In 1962, the plant was renamed Ufa Oil Refinery named after the XXII Congress of the CPSU. Since 1992, it has been a joint—stock company, Ufaneftekhim, and, since 1993, it has been an open joint—stock company. Since 1994, it has been a member of the Bashkir Petrochemical Company.

== See also ==
- List of oil refineries
- Petroleum industry in Russia
