= Prince George Refinery =

Canadian oil refinery

Coordinates: 53°55′42″N 122°41′56″W

- Interactive map of Prince George Refinery
- Location: Prince George, British Columbia, Canada

Refinery details
- Operator: Tidewater Midstream & Infrastructure Ltd.
- Owner: Tidewater Midstream & Infrastructure Ltd.
- Opened: 1967
- Capacity: 12,000 barrels per day (1,900 m^{3}/d)
- No. of employees: 85
- Refining center: Prince George

The Prince George Refinery is a light oil refinery located in the city of Prince George, British Columbia, Canada owned by Tidewater Midstream & Infrastructure Ltd. The refinery feed stock is delivered by pipeline from wells in north-eastern British Columbia. The refinery provides unleaded gasoline, seasonal diesel fuels, mixed propane and butane, and heavy fuel oil. The refinery is fed from the Pembina Pipeline that runs from Taylor, British Columbia through Prince George ending in Kamloops.

The facility was sold by Husky Energy to Tidewater Midstream & Infrastructure Ltd. in October 2019 for $215 million. Husky Energy had owned the facility since 1982.
