= Tabangao Refinery =

Oil refinery in Batangas, Philippines

- Location within Luzon Location within Philippines
- Location: Batangas City, Batangas, Philippines; 13°43′19.5″N 121°03′57.7″E

Refinery details
- Operator: Pilipinas Shell
- Owner: Pilipinas Shell
- Opened: 1962
- Closed: 2020
- Capacity: 110,000 barrels per day (17,000 m^{3}/d)
- No. of employees: ~1000 (2016)

The Tabangao Refinery was an oil refinery in Batangas City, Batangas, Philippines. It was owned and operated by Pilipinas Shell Petroleum Corporation with the capacity to process 110,000 barrels per day (17,000 m^{3}/d). Following its closure in 2020, the site was repurposed as the Shell Import Facility Tabangao (SHIFT), which was inaugurated in 2021.

== History ==
The Tabangao Refinery's construction began in 1960 and was completed in 1962. The oil refinery's inauguration was held on July 28, 1962, and was attended by then-Philippine President Diosdado Macapagal. Its initial capacity was 30,000 bbl/d (4,800 m^{3}/d).

In 1993, expansion and renovation of the Tabangao Refinery (called STAR or Shell Tabangao Asset Renewal) began to replace the old facilities, including two crude distillers built in the 1960s. The expansion was completed in 1995, and the refinery's capacity increased to 110,000 bbl/d (17,000 m^{3}/d).

Due to the impact of the COVID-19 pandemic, operations of the refinery were suspended on May 24, 2020, and in August 2020, Pilipinas Shell decided to permanently close the refinery and convert the site into an import terminal. The repurposed facility, the Shell Import Facility Tabangao (SHIFT), was inaugurated in June 2021. The closure left the Bataan Refinery of Petron as the sole operating oil refinery in the Philippines.
