= Yorktown Refinery =

Oil refinery in Virginia, USA

Coordinates: 37°12′45.9″N 76°26′51.6″W

Yorktown Refinery was an oil refinery in Virginia located alongside of the York River built in 1956. It is now used by Plains All American Pipeline LP as a rail and water oil terminal.

The refinery used to be operated by Giant Industries and earlier operated by BP/Amoco. Giant Industries was acquired by Western Refining in 2007. The refinery could run high TAN crude oil (crude oil with a high content of naphthenic acids). The refining operations were shut down in the fall of 2010 and the refinery was later demolished.
