= Laurel Refinery =

Coordinates: 45°39′35″N 108°45′59″W

The Laurel Refinery is a petroleum refinery located in Laurel, Montana. The refinery is currently owned and operated by CHS Inc.
