= Zhongman Petroleum and Natural Gas Group =

The Zhongman Petroleum and Natural Gas Group (or ZPEC) is a Chinese oilfield services company.

== History ==
The company was founded in 2003. The company received backing from Sequoia Capital.

Reuters in December 2017 reported the company was in talks with Gazprom Neft to take a stake in the Chonsk oil fields development project in Siberia.

== Projects ==
- Iraq - Awarded by Iraqi government a $526.6 million drilling deal for drilling of 66 production oil wells at the West Qurna Two oilfield
- Pakistan - Awarded by Pakistan Petroleum a US$23 million drilling project in Pakistan in 2018.
