= Naftokhimik Prykarpattya =

Oil refinery in Ukraine

- Native name: Нафтохімік Прикарпаття
- Type: Public company, Open joint-stock company
- Founded: 1897
- Headquarters: Nadvirna, Ivano-Frankivsk Oblast, Ukraine
- Parent: Privat Group

Naftokhimik Prykarpattya (formerly Nadvirna Oil Refinery) is one of the oldest oil refineries in Ukraine, built in 1897, with a capacity of about 2.6 million tons of crude oil per year, as of 2005. PJSC Naftokhimik Prykarpattya is one of the six oil refineries in Ukraine, and the only one that works with Ukrainian raw materials.

After it was privatised in 1995, it became a joint-stock company. By 2002, its board included Ihor Kolomoisky and Ihor Palytsia. During the 2008 economic crisis, all production at the refinery was halted, and from this point on it would not return to production again. The refinery started focusing on the storage of crude oil to hold Ukrainian oil reserves, but quickly went under and reported a net loss by the 2020s. Shortly after this, criminal proceedings were started against Ihor Kolomoisky on charges of embezzlement in relation to the refinery. Following this, the Ukrainian government attempted to sell its share in the refinery, but this has so far not been successful.

== History ==
The refinery was constructed in 1897 as a seasonal oil distilling enterprise. Following the takeover of Soviet control, it started work on the fuel industry, producing more than 20 types of petroleum products and petrochemicals. After the collapse of the Soviet Union and Ukraine became independent, the refinery was converted into a joint-stock company. This was approved in 1995 by the Cabinet of Ministers of Ukraine.

By 2002, businessman Ihor Kolomoisky was a member of the supervisory board for the refinery, alongside Ihor Palytsia and Oleksandr Lazorko, who was then chairman of the board. In 2006, the shareholders' meeting approved a 2005 profit of 78.77 million hryvnias, of which 34% was directed towards dividend payments. Subsequently, the State Property Fund sued to recover the dividends, but the Supreme Commercial Court of Ukraine ultimately refused to enforce the claim in May 2016 ruling that the shareholders' decision was valid. In 2009, the enterprise was on the list of particularly important objects of Ukraine's oil and gas sector.

During the 2008 economic crisis, all production at the refinery was halted. By 2012, the refinery was producing at a loss of 34 million hryvnias, with a record loss recorded of 99 million hryvnias in 2015. Starting in 2012, the refinery ceased oil refining and focused on the storage of crude oil. Between the dates of 2014 and 2018, the refinery's storage tanks were used to hold Ukrainian oil reserves, and since then, the enterprise has continued not to resume oil refining. However, this was later turned around by 2019, when the company reported a 17-fold increase in revenue because it had begun trading oil despite laying off 50% of its workforce in August 2017.

Despite this, the company was still reporting a net loss and was in debt by 2020. Shortly after this, criminal proceedings were established to investigate the refinery between 2012 and 2021, with allegations that Ihor Kolomoisky had organised a criminal scheme that involved the embezzlement of funds from the refinery, among other assets he owned, including the creation of a fictitious debt of 600 million hryvnias. On 2 September 2023, he was detained on suspicion of embezzlement in association with the refinery, with the bail set at 509 million hryvnias. Following the allegations, the State Property Fund of Ukraine attempted to sell the shares it held, which amounted to 26% of the refinery (the remaining 74% is held by groups linked to Privat Group under companies registered to the British Virgin Islands). Two auctions for the stake were held in 2024, but both failed, and another auction was scheduled for May 2025, but attracted no participants. In September 2025, a fourth action was held, which reduced the asking price from 440.5 million hryvnias to 425.45 million hryvnias, but again it was not sold.

In the spring of 2025, with the ongoing trial and the Ukrainian state's attempt to sell its stake, the head of the city which the refinery is located in - Nadvirna - announced that he had petitioned the Ukrainian government to nationalise the plant because of the risk of an ecological disaster. He stated the refinery's sewage treatment facilities served the entire area and could also affect the Black Sea as long as it was kept idle, and that the refinery had already owed approximately 10 million hryvnias in local taxes, which were unpaid.
