= Oil in Turkey =

Petroleum and petroleum products in Turkey

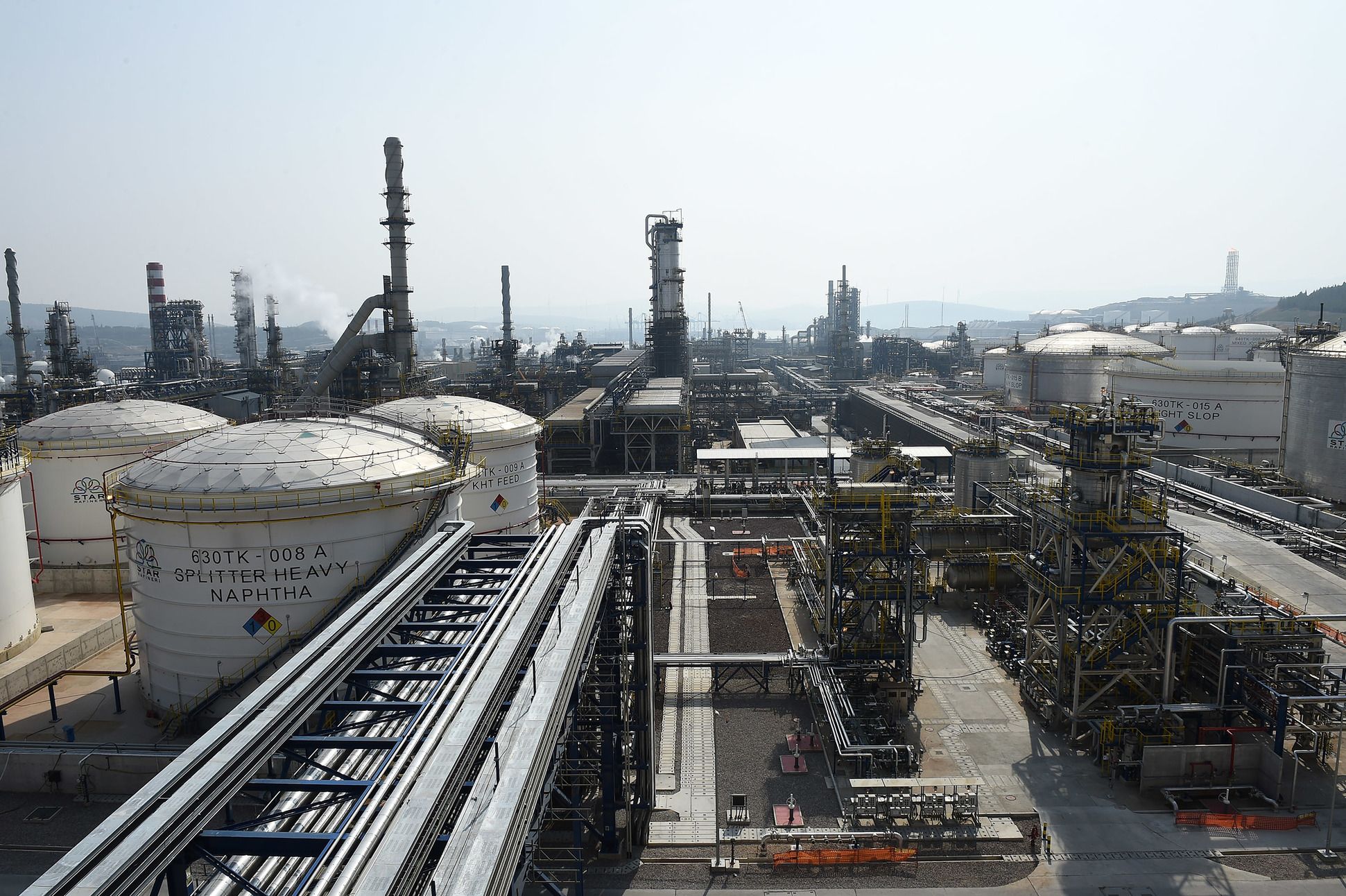
The Star Aegean refinery in İzmir belongs to SOCAR (the state-owned oil company of Azerbaijan), and produces mostly diesel from Azeri oil.

Oil supplies over a quarter of Turkey's energy. The country consumes about a million barrels a day. Because the country produces little oil, it depends on imports of crude oil and diesel. Over half of oil is burnt in the country's road vehicles. Turkey is one of the world's largest users of liquefied petroleum gas, mainly as autogas.

Because Turkey produces only 15% of the crude oil it consumes, the country's total imports are worth more than its exports, which is a problem for its economy. After the 2022 Russian invasion of Ukraine, several European countries stopped buying Russian oil, but Turkey's relations with Russia are such that it supplied most oil imports in 2025, and diesel imports continue.

Exhaust from diesel-fuelled lorries pollutes roads with nitrogen dioxide, carbon monoxide and soot.

== Demand ==
Primary energy supply is about a quarter each from coal, oil, gas, and other sources.

During the 2010s, demand for oil products considerably increased, mainly diesel. Over half of Turkey's imported oil and oil products are used for road transport, and Turkey is the world's largest user of liquefied petroleum gas (LPG) for road transport. It is hoped the locally manufactured electric cars and other electric vehicles from the country's automotive industry and imports will limit the increase in road transport fuel consumption. Far more diesel is consumed than petrol.

== Health and environmental impact ==
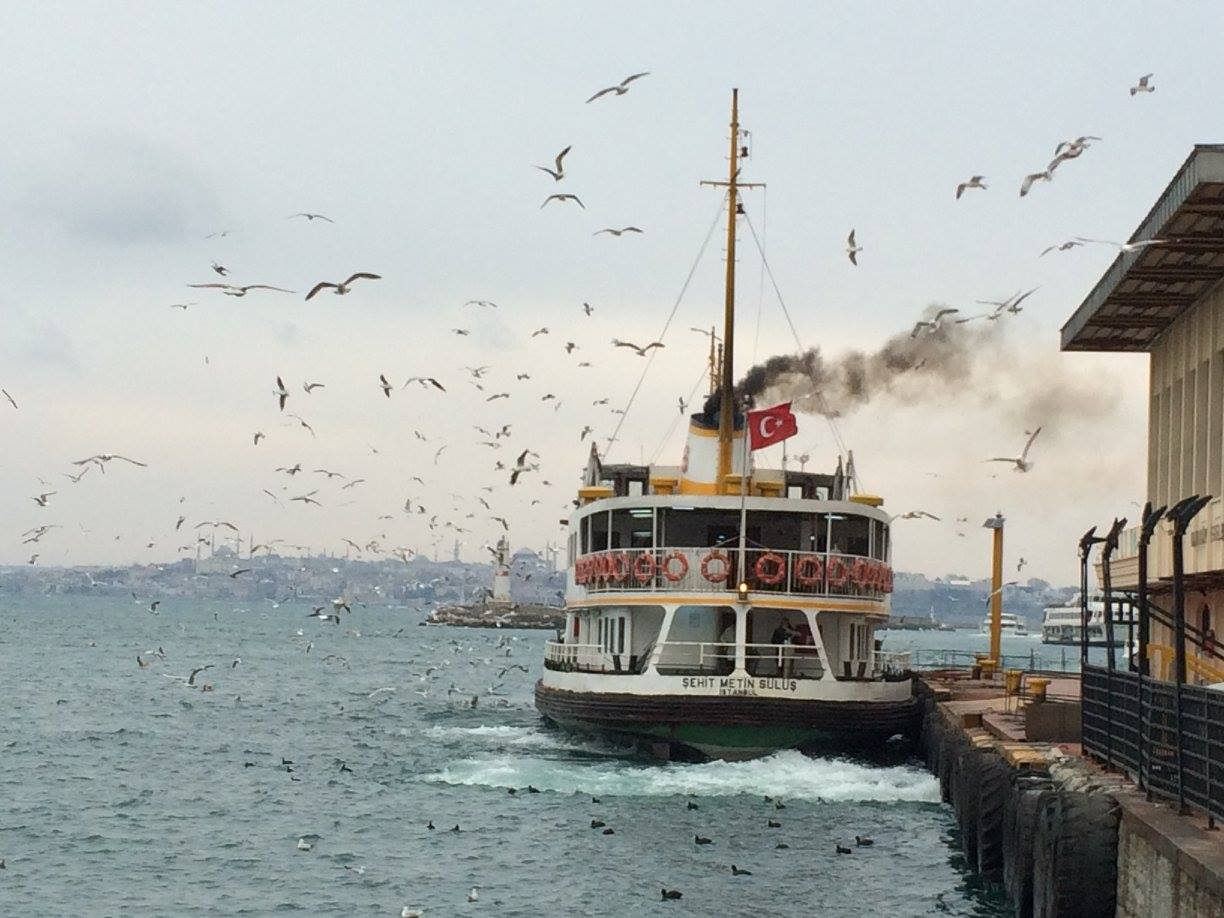
Some ships burn heavy fuel oil near cities.

Exhaust from diesel-fuelled lorries pollutes roads with nitrogen dioxide, carbon monoxide and soot. Istanbul airports also pollute.

Unlike the Mediterranean the Black Sea is not an emission control area; air pollution is emitted from ships in Turkish Black Sea ports. Maritime incidents in the Turkish Straits have resulted in oil spills. Air pollution from ships burning heavy fuel oil near cities is a problem in some places, such as Mersin. Electrification of some ferries is being considered.

Oil production in Russia causes methane leaks into the atmosphere. Because the international greenhouse gas inventory standard is production-based, this is accounted for in Russia's greenhouse gas emissions rather than those of Turkey.

Oil and gas production in southeast Turkey is estimated by Climate Trace to have emitted over two million tonnes of greenhouse gas in 2025.

== Sources ==
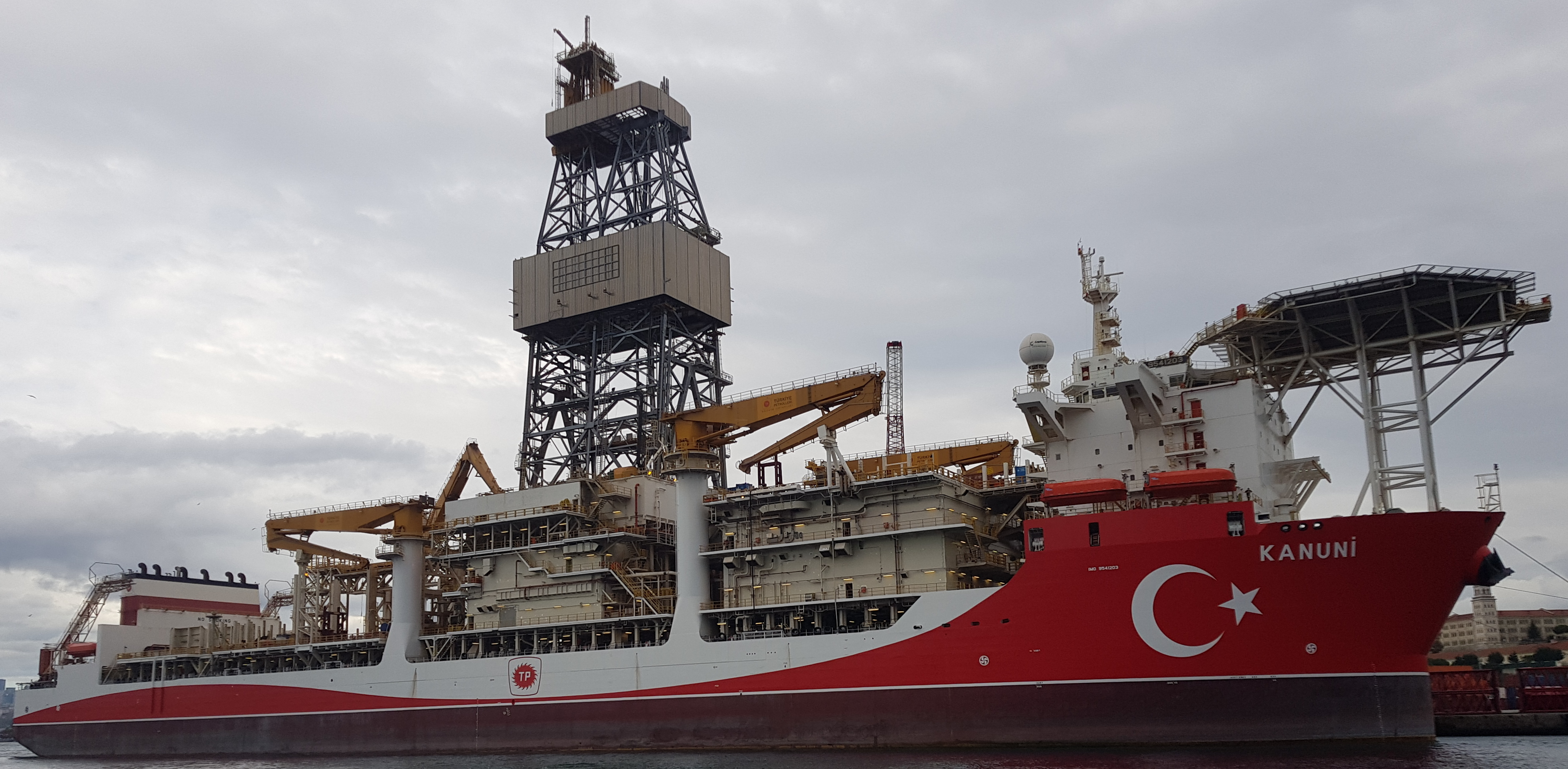
The Kanuni is an offshore deep-sea drilling ship.

Turkey's estimated reserves of oil are about 600 million barrels, (Note: Source incorrectly says tons.) and about 3 million tons are produced each year, about seven percent of Turkey's annual consumption. The country imports around 30 million tons (Note: 1 barrel per day is approx 50 tonnes per year) a year, mostly from Russia and Iraq. However Russian Black Sea shipping and refineries are vulnerable to attacks by Ukraine, such as the 2026 attack on Tuapse. Iraq supplies about 20% of crude oil imports. Imports tend to vary in line with products consumption.

TPAO, the state-owned exploration and production company, drills between 100 and 200 exploratory wells each year. Most proven oil reserves and production are in Batman and Adıyaman Provinces in the southeast, and there is a little in Thrace. Batı Raman has extra heavy crude oil; other fields produce much-lighter domestic crude, whose API gravity averages 28, and this medium-weight oil is suitable for the Turkish market. Şirnak is the province which produces most - 16 million barrels from Gabar in 2024. Shale oil may be extractable from Dadaş but well-waste fluids would need to be properly handled to minimize the environmental impact of hydraulic fracturing.

Oil exploration licenses in Turkey are granted by the General Directorate of Mining and Petroleum Affairs but the process of granting them takes a long time and requires political influence. The Petroleum Market Law provides incentives for investors to explore and produce. Some enhanced oil recovery is carried out at Batı Raman. As well as crude oil, the country imports oil products, diesel, LPG and petcoke—which is used to make cement—and as of 2020, the country's energy import bill closely tracks the price of crude oil. TPAO, which does most of the oil and gas exploration, increased offshore exploration in 2020. TPAO may collaborate with TotalEnergies to explore for oil and gas in the Black Sea.

== Transport ==
Oil is piped from Azerbaijan and Iraq, and some is shipped to larger refineries (R) in the west. Azerbaijani oil is mostly re-exported by tanker from Ceyhan.

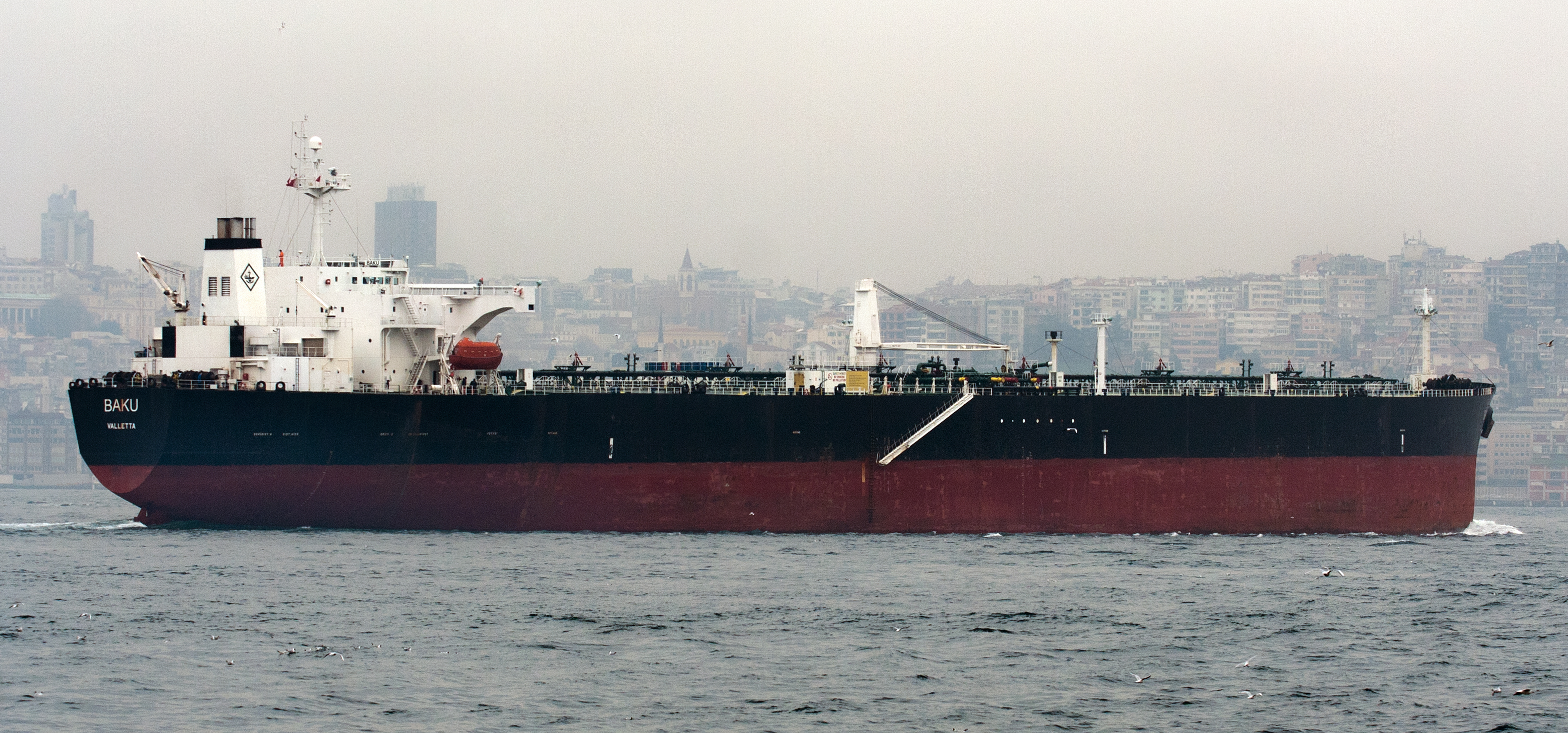
Small tankers, like this one, sometimes carry oil from Novorossiisk on the Black Sea, and pass through the Bosphoros to supply refineries near İzmir.

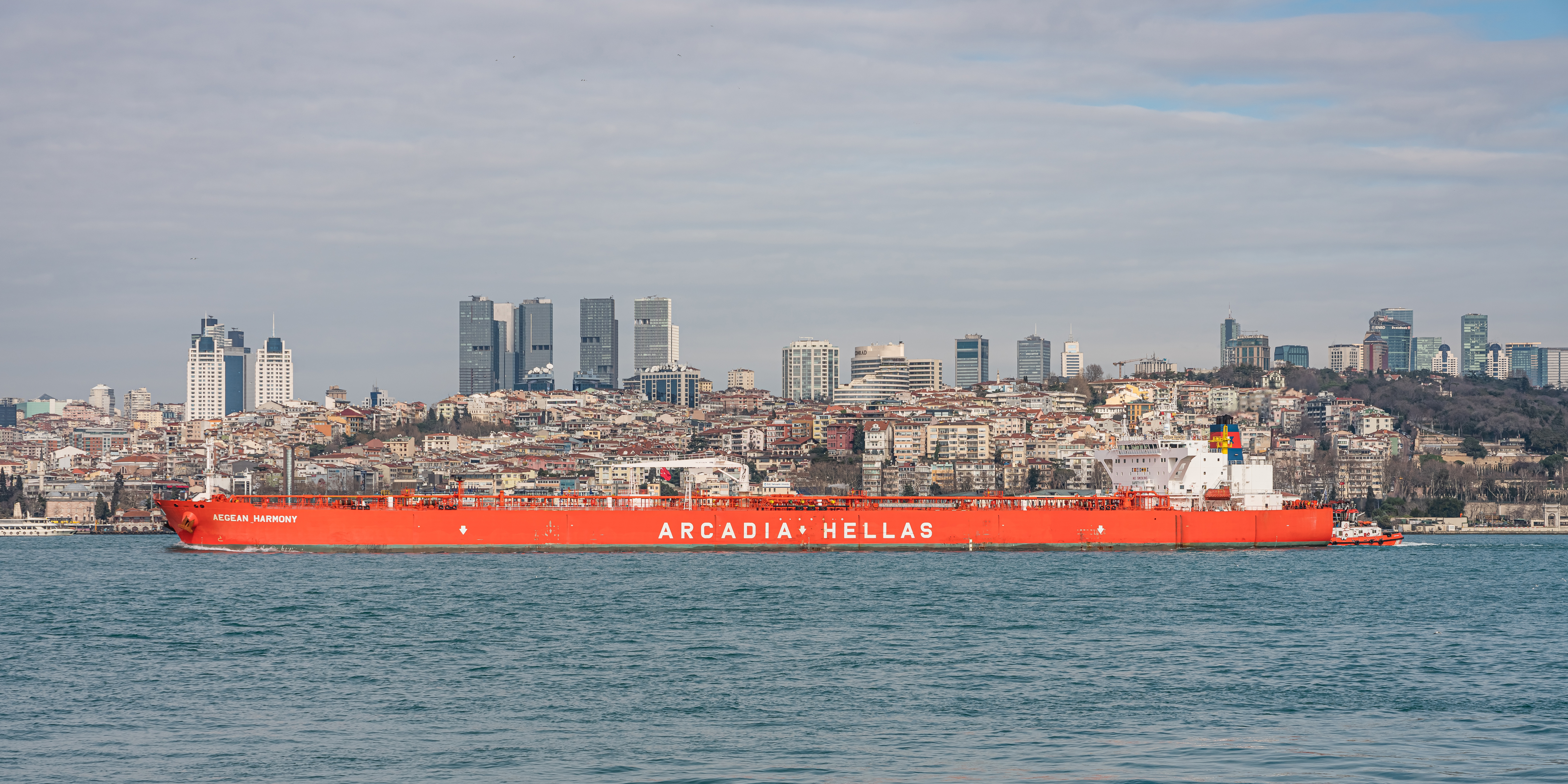
Tankers, like this one in the Bosporus, are one way to export oil from Central Asia.

Diesel fuel imported from Russia is shipped to Turkey from the Black Sea ports of Novorossiysk, Tuapse and Taman, but the amount is limited by Ukrainian attacks on Russian refineries. Only China and India buy more Russian oil than Turkey. In 2026 a Turkish-operated tanker carrying about 1m barrels of crude from Novorossiysk was attacked by a sea drone.

A pipeline from Iraq was shut in 2014 due to ISIS attacks and not reopened until 2026: Iraq claims they could delivery up to 1 mbd. But previously Iraq consistently had not delivered the agreed 1.5 mbd, and in 2026 a one year agreement was signed for maximum 750 thousand mbd, perhaps due to continued negotiation after Iraq won an arbitration case that oil from Kirkuk is controlled by the Iraqi central government not the Kurdistan region. Two pipelines in Iraq join near the Turkish border and, as of 2026, oil is flowing through both of them to Turkey.

Russian and Caspian oil is transported by ship through the Bosporus. In 2005, an oil-spill response law was passed in Turkey, and in 2022, oil-tanker insurance was made compulsory. As well as drillships, there are two seismic ships.

Turkey's oil imports from Russia increased after the 2022 Russian invasion of Ukraine, but crude imports from Russia decreased in 2026 and those from the USA increased. In the early 2020s Turkey consumed large quantities of cheap Russian diesel, which may have freed up diesel from Turkish refineries to be exported to the EU, but in 2026 Russia banned diesel exports. Oil tankers from Novorossiysk deliver to Korfez and Aliağa, near Turkey's third-biggest city İzmir. Some Russian oil goes through Dörtyol terminal in Hatay. Most Russian diesel exports went to Turkey because the EU has sanctioned such imports.

There is a port at Aliağa called Nemrut Bay. The Kirkuk–Ceyhan oil pipeline has a capacity of 1.6 mbd and the Baku–Tbilisi–Ceyhan (BTC) pipeline 1 mbd. Most exports from the petroleum industry in Azerbaijan transit Turkey because their light oil fetches a premium price on the world market. A small amount is shipped from Kazakhstan over the Caspian to the BTC pipeline in Azerbaijan. In 2024 protesters against the war in Gaza called for transit of crude and refined products to Israel to be stopped.

== Refining and storage ==
Turkey's largest oil refiner is Tüpraş with four refineries. The newest refinery Star Aegean, in Aliağa, has over half the market for petroleum products. Turkish oil's sulfur content is generally high so refineries were upgraded to meet Mediterranean shipping sulfur limits, which were cut from 0.5% to 0.1% in 2025. Together, the five refineries have a capacity of over 400 million tons a year (815,000 mbd) as of 2022. More jet fuel is produced than the country consumes, so it is exported. Refineries prefer to produce diesel rather than jet fuel. There is a strategic reserve of crude.

== Retail and consumption ==
There is a biennial trade fair in Istanbul. More diesel is sold than petrol. Almost half the cars sold in 2025 were completely petrol-fuelled and over a quarter hybrid. Over one hundred thousand barrels of jet fuel are sold in a typical year. Less bunker fuel was sold in 2022, because of the decline in shipping due the Russian invasion of Ukraine.

== Economics ==
According to some analysts, the cost of imported oil and gas is a key weakness in the economy of Turkey. Turkey buys Urals crude from Russia because it is cheaper than oil from other countries. Russian oil is refined and the refined products are sold abroad.

=== Subsidies and taxes ===
The government varies the special consumption tax to try and smooth out retail fuel price variations due to oil price and exchange rate fluctuations. Farmers receive a tax break on diesel.

== Geopolitics ==
In 2019, the European Council objected to Turkish drilling in the eastern Mediterranean. Unlike several European countries, which stopped buying oil and gas from Russia or were cut off after the 2022 Russian invasion of Ukraine, relations with Russia are such Turkey continues to buy both commodities from Russia. Turkey can consume discounted Russian diesel, and also buys discounted Russian crude, which it refines and sells legally as of 2022 (Note: In February 2023, however, an EU ban on direct importation of products refined from Russian crude started; products of Russian crude refined in other countries are legal.) as Turkish at the global price. For example, Shell and Vitol are claimed to have done this with SOCAR and Tüpraş, although there is no proof the purchased products were refined from Russian crude. Crude from different countries is often blended at refineries so as of 2023, it is not possible to tell where a barrel of diesel originated from; NGO Global Witness said the EU should ban products from refineries that refine Russian crude.

It is sometimes difficult for media in Turkey to fully report on energy geopolitics. Turkey's President Recep Tayyip Erdoğan said in 2022 Turkey could not join sanctions on Russia because of import dependency. TPAO hopes to explore for oil and gas in Libyan waters, and a memorandum of understanding has been agreed with the Libyan government. Turkey is helping Somalia drill. According to Nordic Monitor newspaper (which is internet blocked in Turkey) Turkey is trying to reduce fossil fuel dependance on Russia as when Akkuyu nuclear starts generating that will be an electricity dependance, they also say Turkey is buying more American oil not only due to 2026 price advantage but also as Turkey USA relations are improved. In the 2010s and early 2020s Turkey reduced imports from Iran to almost nothing due to American pressure.

== Reducing fossil fuel share of energy ==
Turkey intends to increase the share of renewables and nuclear power in the national energy mix. According to a May 2022 report from think tank Ember, wind power and solar power saved Turkey seven billion dollars on gas imports in the preceding 12 months. It is hoped further electrification, of sectors such as road transport will reduce Turkey's dependency on imported oil.

== History ==
During the early 20th century, the Ottoman Empire granted a concession allowing William Knox D'Arcy to explore oil fields in its territories which, after the dissolution of the Ottoman Empire, became the modern countries Turkey and Iraq. In 1912, D'Arcy and other European partners founded the Turkish Petroleum Company, which was later renamed the Iraq Petroleum Company.

In late Ottoman times, permission to explore for oil in the İskenderun area was granted to the Grand Vizier Kamil Pasha and later to Ahmet Necati Bey. With the fall of the Ottoman Empire, oil and gas fields in Mosul vilayet—of which Kirkuk was a part—were lost and since then, Turkey has had to rely on imports. In 1926, the Turkish government took over oil exploration rights. In 2001 natural gas was legally separated from oil. The General Directorate of Mineral Research and Exploration was formed. The first oil imports from Russia arrived in 1986 and from Azerbaijan in 2007.

Between 2000 and 2020, Turkey's share of imported energy increased from just over 50% to 70%. In 2022, Turkey's oil consumption decreased due to the COVID-19 pandemic and resulting travel restrictions. Also in 2022, Middle Eastern crude imports were displaced by imports of discounted Russian crude, which tripled in the period from before the Ukraine invasion to 1 January 2023.

In 2023, the International Court of Arbitration ruled Turkey could not import from Iraqi Kurdistan without the consent of the Iraqi central government. Sales from Iraq were affected by discounted Russian crude.

== Sources ==
- Difiglio, Prof. Carmine; Güray, Bora Şekip; Merdan, Ersin (November 2020). Turkey Energy Outlook. iicec.sabanciuniv.edu (Report). Sabanci University Istanbul International Center for Energy and Climate (IICEC). ISBN 978-605-70031-9-5.
