= Tüpraş Batman Oil Refinery =

Oil refinery in Turkey

Coordinates: 37°52′53″N 41°08′34″E

- Interactive map of Tüpraş Batman Oil Refinery
- Location: Batman, Turkey

Refinery details
- Opened: 1955
- Capacity: 1.1 million tonnes
- No. of employees: 463

Tüpraş Batman Oil Refinery (Turkish: Tüpraş Batman Rafinerisi) is an oil refinery in Batman, southeastern Turkey. It is owned and operated by Tüpraş, the country's only oil refiner with four refineries.

Batman Oil Refinery is situated in downtown Batman. It became operational in 1955. The facility has an annual crude oil refining capacity of 1.1 million tonnes. It has the advantage of proximity to the domestic oil fields. It has a simple configuration due to the lack of refining units. Intermediate goods are sent to the refineries in Izmir and kırıkkale by road transportation for further processing. In 2016, 1.0 million tonnes of asphalt base were produced, being a record. The storage capacity of the refinery is 253,000 tonnes. The facility has a Nelson complexity index of 1.83. 463 personnel are employed in the facility.
