= Tüpraş İzmit Oil Refinery =

Oil refinery in Turkey

Coordinates: 40.754°N 29.765°E

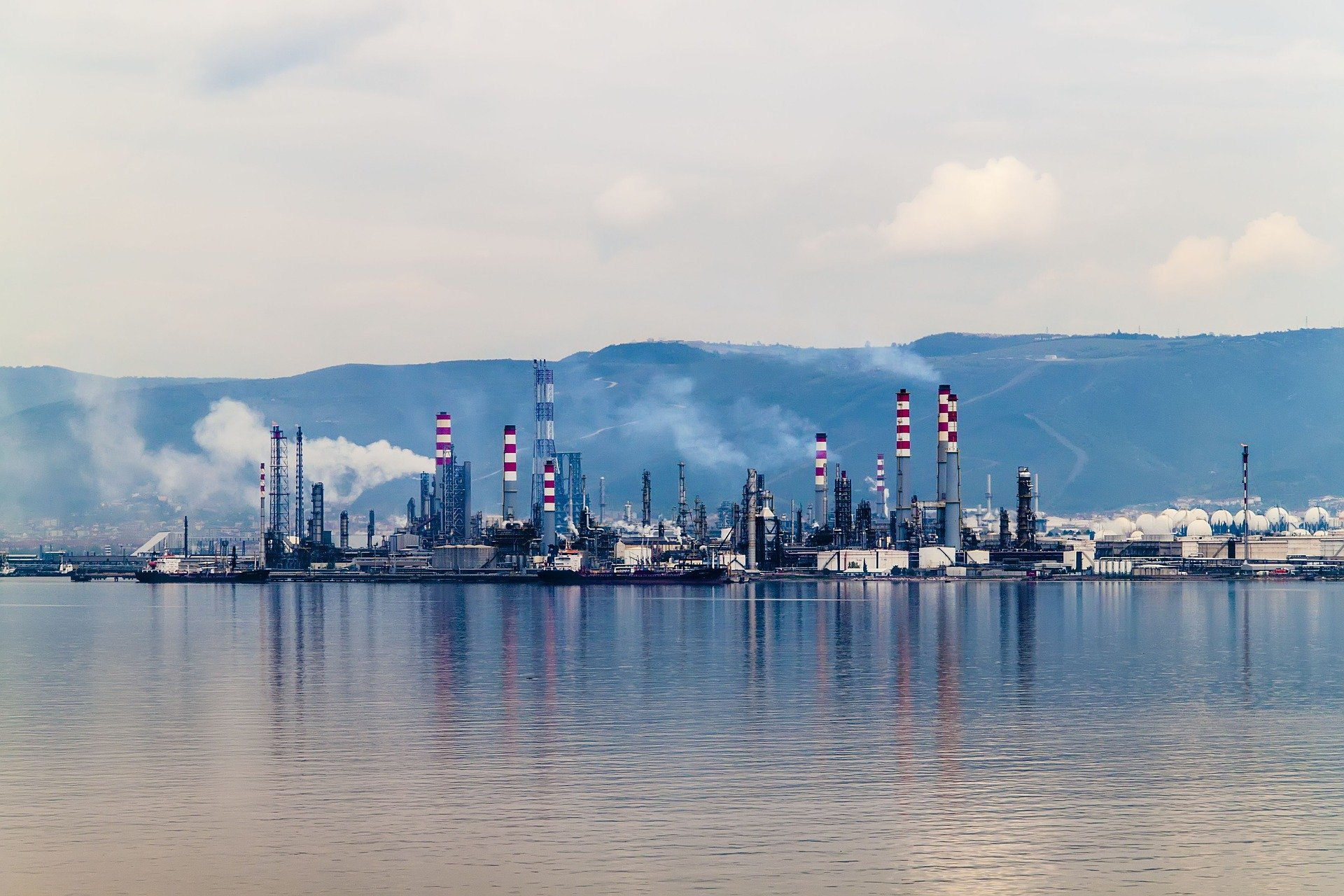
- Interactive map of Tüpraş İzmit Oil Refinery
- Location: Körfez, Kocaeli Province

Refinery details
- Owner: Tüpraş
- Opened: 1961
- Website: https://www.tupras.com.tr/en/rafineries

Tüpraş İzmit Oil Refinery (Turkish: Tüpraş İzmit Rafinerisi), also known as the İzmit Refinery, is an oil refinery at Tütünçiftlik on the northeastern shore of the Gulf of İzmit, in the Körfez district of Kocaeli Province, western Turkey. It is owned and operated by Tüpraş. With a registered design capacity of 11.3 million tonnes of crude oil per year, the refinery supplies more than a third of Turkey's demand for petroleum products. Its capacity is slightly less than that of Tüpraş İzmir. Amongst others it refines Urals crude.

== History ==
The refinery was established by the İstanbul Petroleum Refinery Corporation (İPRAŞ) and began production in 1961 with a crude oil processing capacity of one million tonnes per year. The American oil company Caltex operated it during its first decade. Successive expansion and debottlenecking projects raised the plant's capacity to 11.5 million tonnes per year by 1982, and in 1983 İPRAŞ was merged with Turkey's other state refineries to form Tüpraş. A hydrocracker and a continuous catalytic regeneration reformer, installed by a consortium of Tekfen and Snamprogetti, entered service in 1997. The refinery passed into private ownership in 2006, when a majority shareholding in Tüpraş was transferred to Koç Holding following the company's privatisation.

=== 1999 earthquake and fire ===
The refinery was severely damaged by the 1999 İzmit earthquake of 17 August 1999, whose epicentre lay only a few kilometres away. Sloshing of volatile naphtha broke the seals of several floating-roof storage tanks, and sparks from metal-to-metal contact ignited fires that destroyed six naphtha tanks and spread through the tank farm; a 115-metre reinforced concrete heater stack also collapsed onto one of the crude distillation units, severing 63 product and utility lines and starting a further fire. The plant lost its firefighting capability after its stored fire water was exhausted on the first day and the supply pipeline from Lake Sapanca ruptured in multiple places; the fires were fought with foam dropped from aircraft, fire engines sent from neighbouring municipalities and from Bulgaria and Germany, and seawater pumped from the bay, and were declared under control about five days after the earthquake. According to refinery management, about 30,000 tonnes of petroleum products, mostly naphtha, were burnt. Residents within a few kilometres of the plant were evacuated and spilled oil polluted İzmit Bay, but no deaths or injuries were reported at the refinery itself. The refinery remained completely shut for more than three months, and the damaged crude unit was still out of service more than a year later.

== Facilities and operations ==
The refinery produces liquefied petroleum gas, naphtha, gasoline, jet fuel, kerosene, diesel fuel, heating oil, fuel oil and bitumen, with road fuels meeting Euro V specifications. It has around three million cubic metres of storage capacity and its own port on the Gulf of İzmit.

Between 2011 and 2014 Tüpraş carried out the Residuum Upgrading Project at the site, described by the company as the largest single industrial investment in the history of the Turkish Republic, which was built under a turnkey contract by Spain's Técnicas Reunidas at a reported cost of about US$3 billion. The facility, commissioned in late 2014, converts about 4.2 million tonnes of high-sulphur fuel oil and residues a year into some 3.5 million tonnes of higher-value light products such as diesel, gasoline and LPG. Following the investment the refinery reached a Nelson complexity index of 14.5, placing it among the most advanced refineries in the world in conversion capability. A revamp of its fluid catalytic cracking unit, carried out by Tekfen, was completed in 2021. In 2019 the refinery processed 11.1 million tonnes of crude oil and about two million tonnes of semi-finished feedstocks.

== Environmental record ==
Climate Trace estimates that in 2023 the refinery emitted almost 3 million tonnes of greenhouse gas.
