= Tüpraş Kırıkkale Oil Refinery =

Oil refinery in Kırıkkale, Turkey

Coordinates: 39°45′10″N 33°27′48″E

- Interactive map of Tüpraş Kırıkkale Oil Refinery
- Location: Hacılar, Turkey

Refinery details
- Opened: 1986

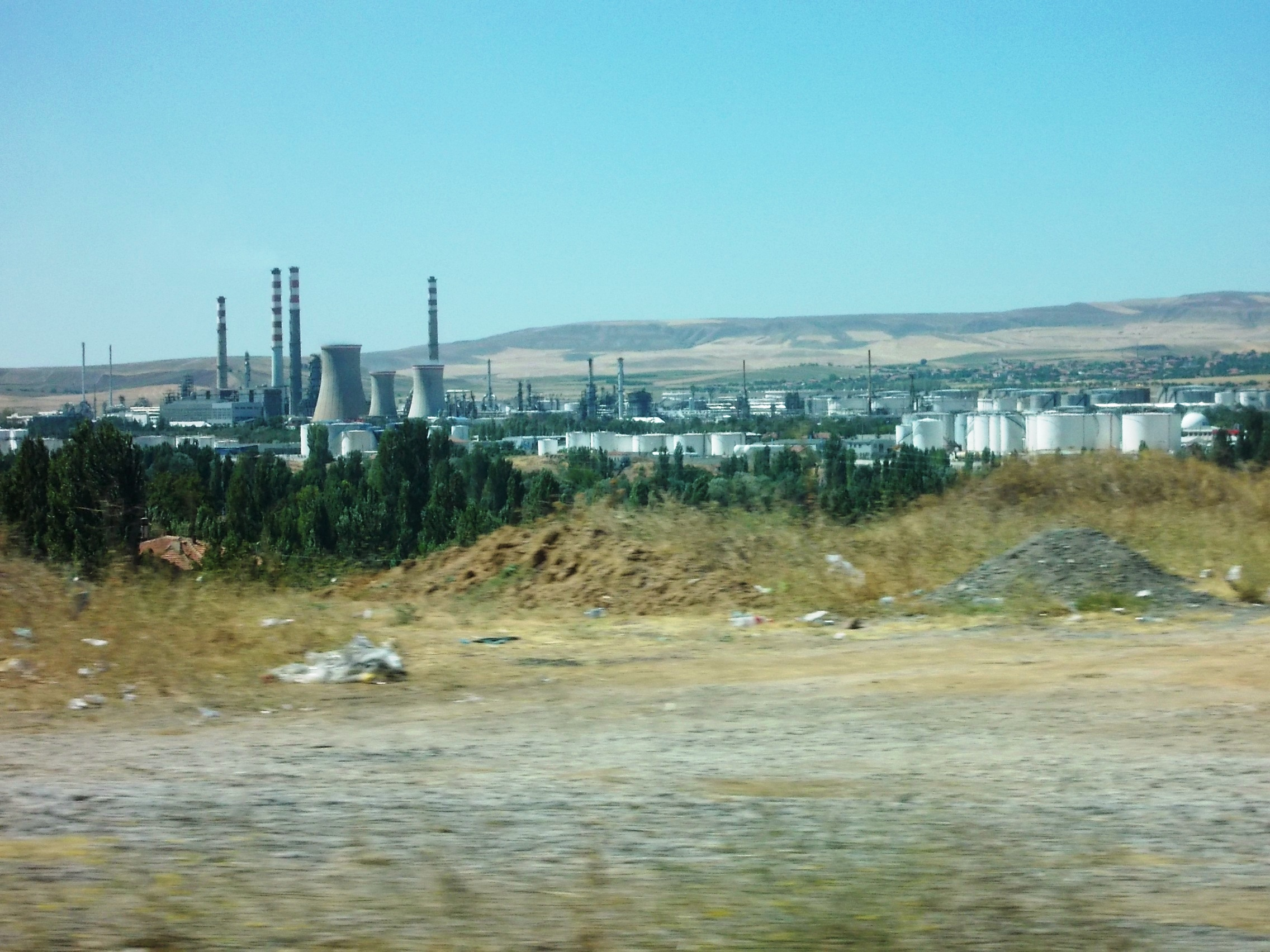
Kırıkkale oil Refinery, 2012

Tüpraş Kırıkkale Oil Refinery (Turkish: Tüpraş Kırıkkale Rafinerisi) is an oil refinery in Kırıkkale, central Turkey. It is owned and operated by Tüpraş.

The refinery is located on the west bank of Kızılırmak River in Hacılar town about 15 km (9.3 mi) south of Kırıkkale and about 80 km (50 mi) southeast of Ankara, in central Turkey. The refinery is built on a land of 2,134,000 m^{2} (213.4 ha) in a property stretching over 815 ha (2,010 acres).

The refinery became operational in 1986. With its annual crude oil refining capacity of around 5 million tonnes, it is a middle-sized refinery in terms of Mediterranean standards. After its initial construction, the refinery was expanded by adding the units of hydrocraking, isomerization, diesel fuel desulfurisation and continuous catalyst regeneration (CCR) reforming. Crude oil is supplied from the Botaş Ceyhan Oil Terminal using the Ceyhan-Kırıkkale Oil Pipeline. The facility has a Nelson complexity index of 6.32. Its storage capacity is 1.41 million tonnes. It has the country's biggest filling capacity for tank trucks. 865 people are employed in the facility. The refinery serves the regional markets of Ankara Province, Central Anatolia, eastern Mediterranean and eastern Black Sea regions. In 2015, a total of 3.05 million tonnes diverse petroleum products, such as liquefied petroleum gas (LPG), gasoline, jet fuel (ATF), diesel fuel, asphalt base, were processed.

A project for increasing the capacity of the hydrocraker unit from 2,500 to 3,000 m^{3}/d (88,000 to 106,000 cu ft/d) is underway, which was launched in November 2017 and is scheduled to complete end of 2019. A new thermal power plant will be built to replace the existing inefficient power station situated close to the refinery. The new power plant will be supplied by oil from the capacity expansion of the refinery. Climate Trace estimate 2023 greenhouse gas emissions at 1.38 million tonnes.
