= Mount Gabar =

Mountain in Turkey

Mount Gabar is a mountain in Şırnak Province in southeastern Turkey. Its oilfield supplies about a tenth of oil in Turkey.
