= The Petroleum Dictionary =

Dictionary covering terms used in the American oil industry

- Author: Lalia Phipps Boone
- Language: English
- Subject: Dictionary
- Publisher: University of Oklahoma Press
- Publication date: 1952
- Publication place: USA
- Pages: 338
- OCLC: 1559541

The Petroleum Dictionary is a dictionary covering terms used in the American oil industry. It was compiled by Lalia Phipps Boone and was first published by the University of Oklahoma Press in 1952.

== Overview ==
The Petroleum Dictionary contains short definitions for around 6,000 terms used in the oil industry in America, with a particular focus on slang. It is intended as a record of the history of these colloquialisms, rather than a reference work for individuals in the petroleum industry.

== Reception ==
Writing in the Journal of Geology, G. Frederick Shepherd from the General American Oil Company of Texas commented on the incomplete nature of the dictionary, describing it as "an excellent start...but not the end point". As an example, he highlighted the fact that it contains only 68 of the 573 abbreviations listed by Rinehart Oil News Company in a guide to language used in oil reports. He attributed these omissions partly to the fact that the work underwent more detailed reviewing by language specialists rather than industry technicians. Shepherd, however, did praise Boone for her detailed and interesting research into the history of words, and her inclusion of a number of euphemisms, which made the dictionary "remarkable for its freshness and occasional spice".

Maurice Merrill, comparing the Dictionary with a similar work entitled Manual of Oil and Gas Terms, noted the absence of legal terms in Boone's work, suggesting that for individuals within the oil industry, the Manual of Oil and Gas Terms was a preferable reference work.

In the Southwestern Historical Quarterly, reviewer David Donoghue highlighted several "errors of the inexcusable variety", and suggested that the dictionary had "little to offer" to the "oil fielder who is seriously interested in what makes the business go".
