= Tüpraş =

Turkish company

Turkey Petrol Refineries S.A.
- Native name: Türkiye Petrol Rafinerileri A.Ş.
- Company type: Anonim Şirket
- Traded as: BİST: TUPRS
- Industry: Oil & gas
- Founded: 1983; 43 years ago
- Founder: Government of Turkey
- Headquarters: Büyükdere Avenue, Zincirlikuyu, Mecidiyeköy, Şişli, Istanbul
- Area served: Worldwide
- Key people: M. Ömer Koç (Chairman); İbrahim Yelmenoğlu (CEO)
- Products: Petroleum, natural gas, petrochemicals, fuel oil, aviation fuels, LPG
- Revenue: ▲US$29.91 billion (2022)
- Operating income: ▲US$2.48 billion (2022)
- Net income: ▲US$2.00 billion (2022)
- Total assets: ▲US$11.28 billion (2022)
- Total equity: ▲US$3.58 billion (2022)
- Owner: Koç family
- Number of employees: 6,181
- Subsidiaries: List: DİTAŞ Üsküdar Tankercilik A.Ş. Damla Denizcilik A.Ş. Kadıköy Tankercilik A.Ş. Beykoz Tankercilik A.Ş. Sarıyer Tankercilik A.Ş. Körfez Hava Ulaştırma A.Ş. Opet THY Opet Havacılık Yakıtları A.Ş. Opet International Limited Opet Trade B.V. Opet Trade Singapore
- Website: https://www.tupras.com.tr/en/default

Türkiye Petrol Rafinerileri A.Ş. is a company in Turkey, operating four refineries with a total capacity to handle an annual 30 million tons of crude.

== Introduction ==
Tüpraş operates four oil refineries, three of which process imported crude. The İzmit refinery in northwestern Turkey and the İzmir refinery at Aliağa on the Aegean coast each have an annual capacity of 11 million tonnes, and both receive crude from global markets via marine tankers. The Kırıkkale refinery in central Turkey, has an annual capacity of 5 million tonnes and processes crude oil that is shipped to the Mediterranean hub at Ceyhan and then transported inland to the refinery through a bespoke pipeline. The fourth facility, the Batman refinery, has an annual capacity of 1.1 million tonnes. It processes domestic crude extracted from numerous small oil fields in southeastern Turkey, which is transported to the facility via an existing pipeline network and road tankers.

Tüpraş also owns a majority stake (79.98%) in the shipping company DİTAŞ and, since 2006, a 40% ownership of petrol retailer Opet.

The company's origins go back to İPRAŞ (İstanbul Petrol Rafinerisi A.Ş.) established by the U.S. Caltex Company (now part of Chevron). In 1983, İPRAŞ and three other publicly owned refineries were brought into state control under the Tüpraş umbrella. Partial privatization started in 1991, when an IPO sold 2.5% of shares to the public; by 2005 a number of secondary issues had taken this up to 49%. In 2005, a consortium of Koç Holding and Shell bid over $4 billion to acquire the 51% interest remaining; this was through a new joint venture company, Enerji Yatırımları A.Ş. The company’s shares were divided among the shareholders as follows: Koç Holding A.Ş. 75%, Aygaz A.Ş. 20%, OPET Petrolcülük A.Ş. 3%, Shell Overseas Investment B.V. 1.9% and the Shell Company of Turkey Ltd. 0.1%.

== Refineries ==
Tüpraş controls most of Turkey’s refining capacity and owns 57% of the total petroleum products storage capacity; it also has a strong indirect downstream position through its shareholding in Opet.

Overview of Tüpraş refineries.
| Characteristic | Batman | Izmir | Izmit | Kırıkkale |
|---|---|---|---|---|
| Operational | 1955 | 1972 | 1961 | 1986 |
| Production capacity (million tonnes/year) | 1.1 | 11.0 | 11.0 | 5.0 |
| Storage capacity (million tonnes) | 0.253 | 2.51 | 3.03 | 1.41 |
| Personnel | 463 | 1,353 | 1,923 | 865 |
| Nelson complexity index | 1.83 | 7.66 | 14.5 | 6.32 |

== See also ==
- List of companies of Turkey
- Tüpraş Batman Oil Refinery
- Tüpraş Izmir Oil Refinery
- Tüpraş Izmit Oil Refinery
- Tüpraş Kırıkkale Oil Refinery
