= SOCAR Star Oil Refinery =

Oil refinery in İzmir, Turkey

Coordinates: 38°47′39″N 26°55′50″E

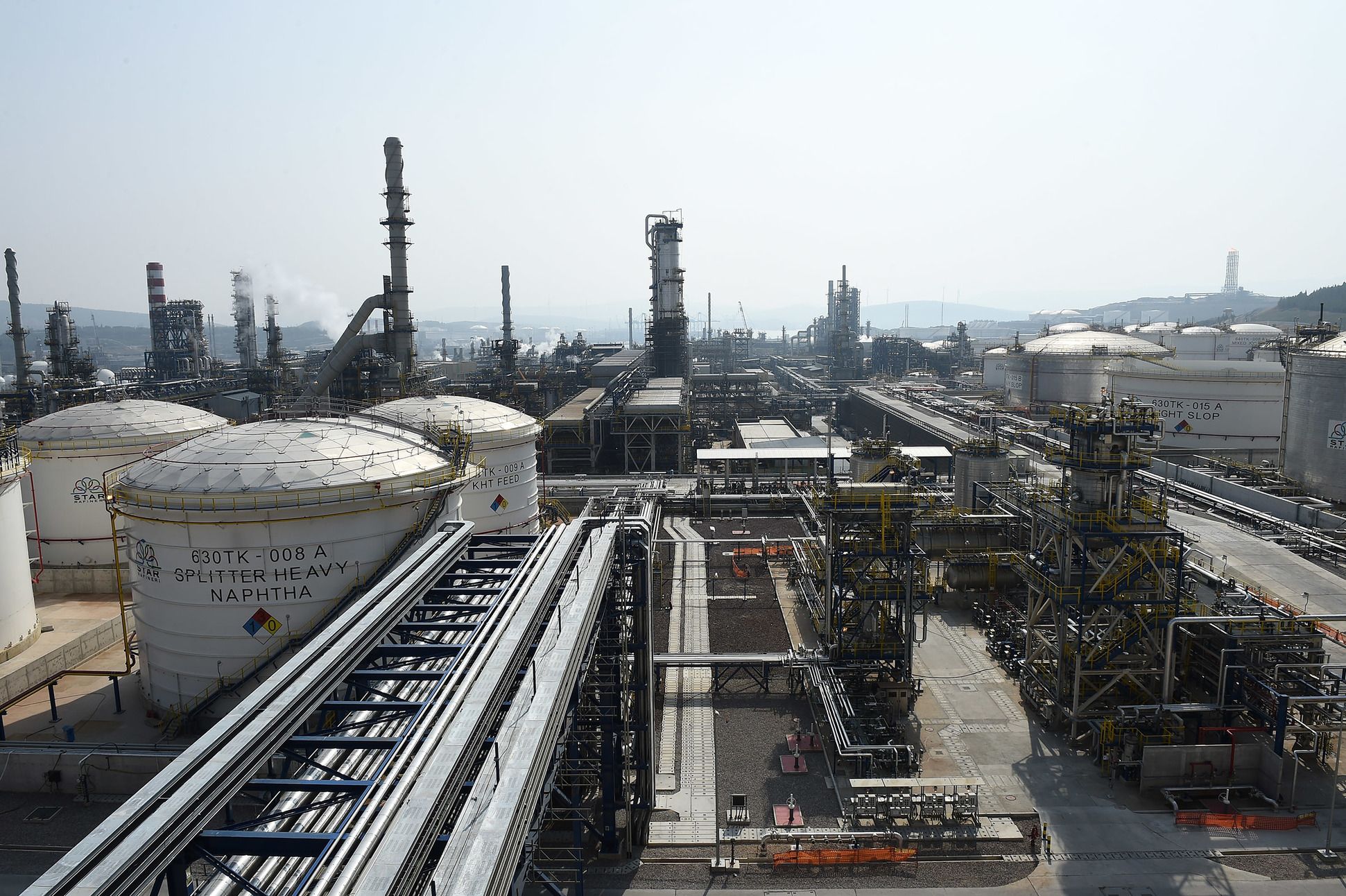
SOCAR Star Oil Refinery

SOCAR Star Oil Refinery or SOCAR STAR Oil Refinery or Star Aegean is an oil refinery in Aliaga, western Turkey. It is operated by the State Oil Company of the Republic of Azerbaijan SOCAR, who holds 60% of the ownership. The remaining 40% being owned by the Ministry of Economy of the Republic of Azerbaijan.

The construction of the refinery started in 2011, cost around US$6-7 billion and became operational in October 2018.

The refinery has a capacity around 200,000 barrels per day. Climate Trace estimates it emitted over 3 million tonnes of the country’s greenhouse gas in 2023.

== See also ==
- Oil in Turkey
