= Petroleum in the United States =

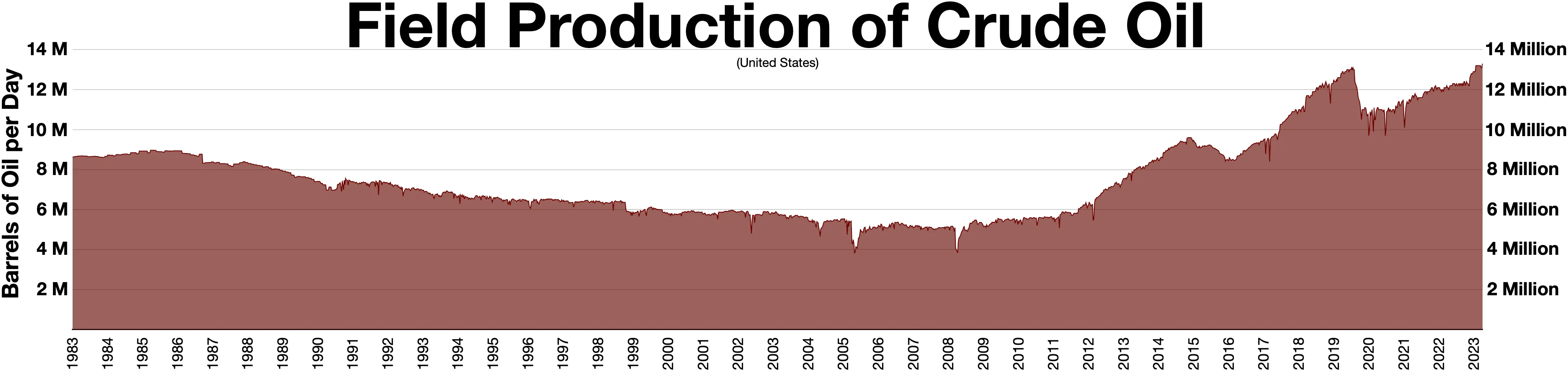
Crude oil production in barrels of oil a day (average for the month)

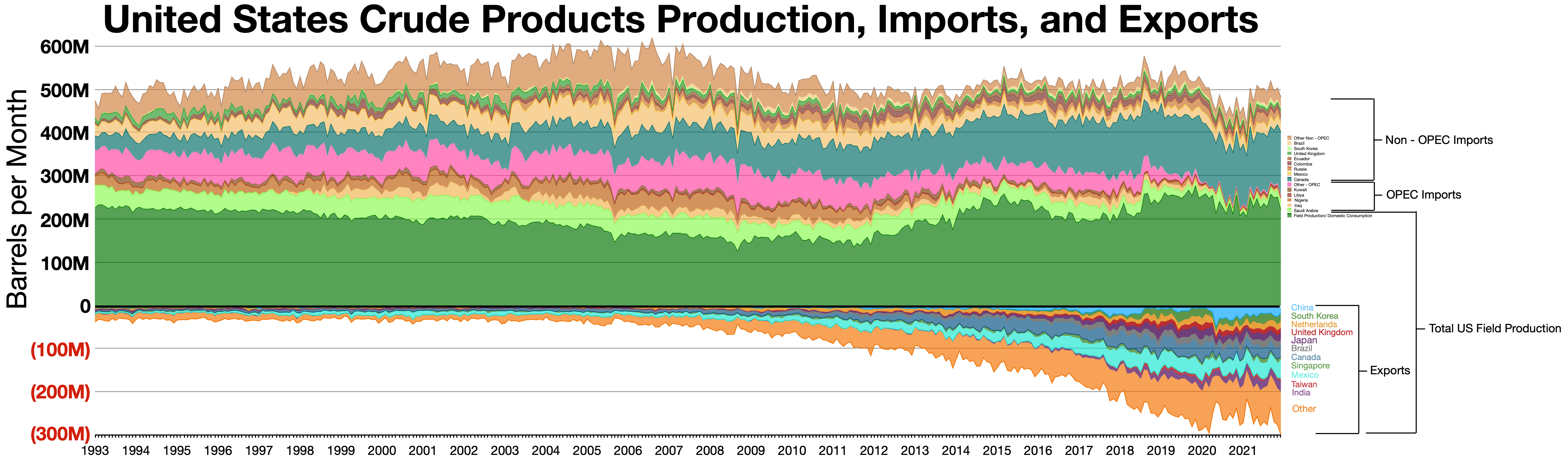
US oil production, imports, & exports

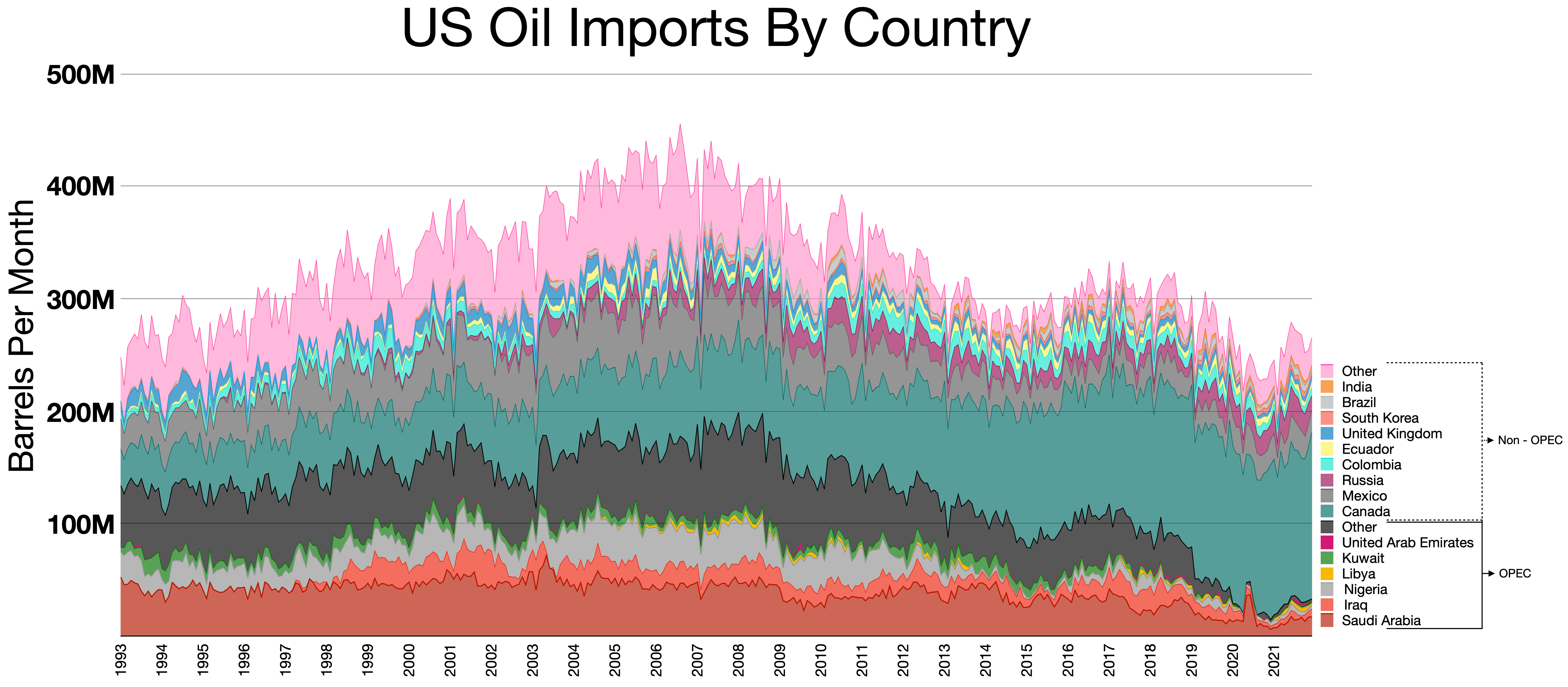
Oil product imports by country

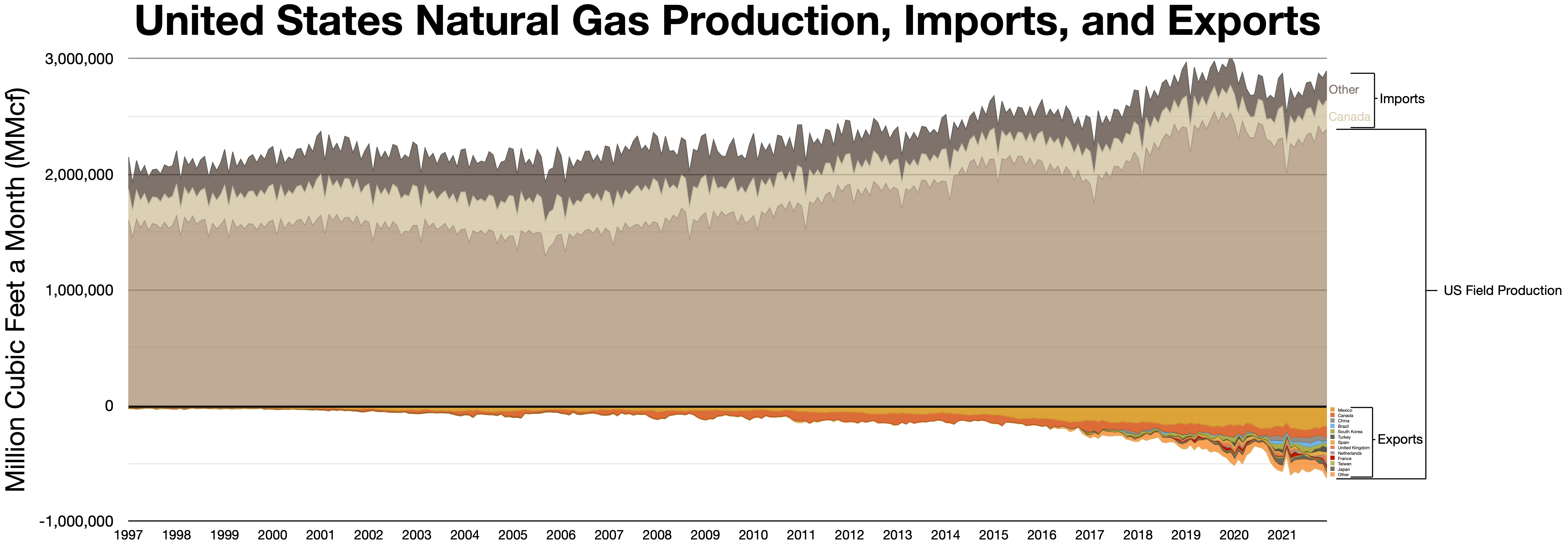
US natural gas production, imports, and exports

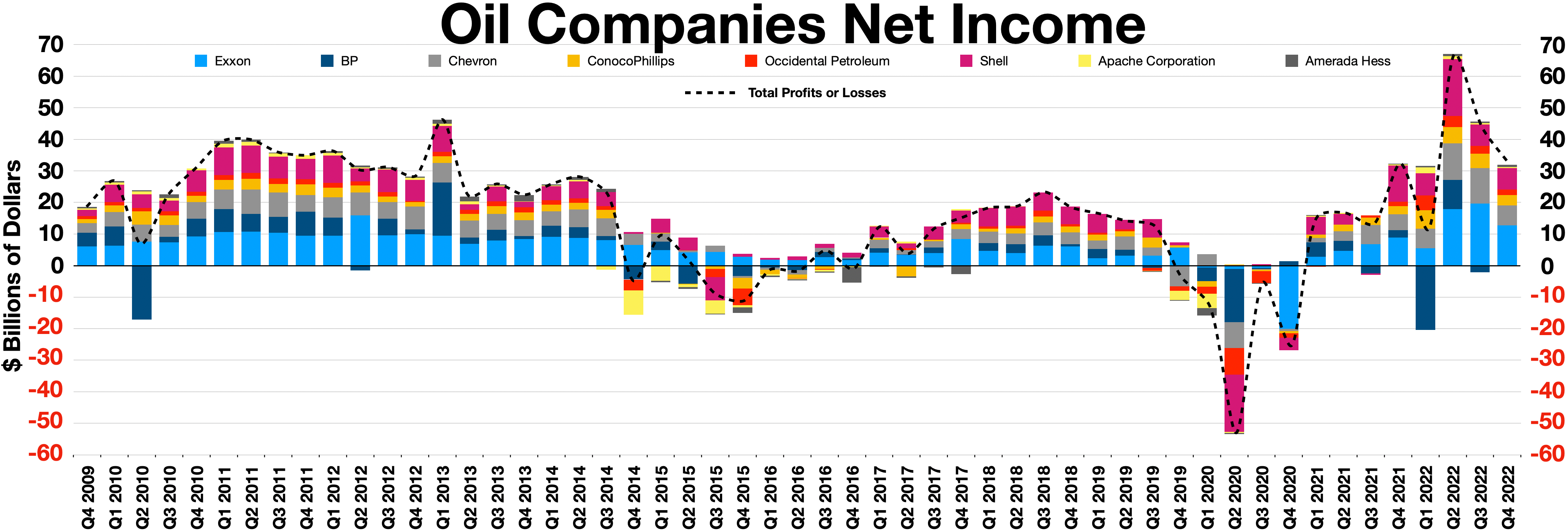
Top 8 oil companies quarterly net income or net loss

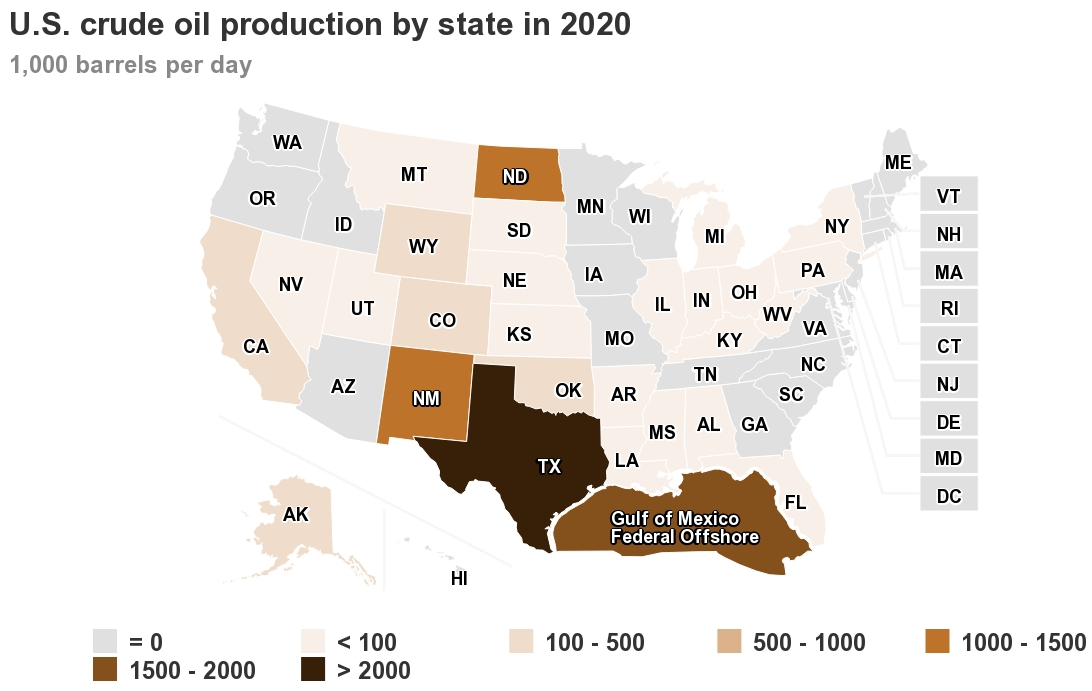
Oil production by state 2020

US energy consumption, by source, 1776–2024. Vertical axis is in quadrillion BTU.

The United States is the largest producer of petroleum in the world. Petroleum has been a major industry in the United States since the 1859 Pennsylvania oil rush around Titusville, Pennsylvania. Commonly characterized as "Big Oil", the industry includes exploration, production, refining, transportation, and marketing of oil and natural gas products. The leading crude oil-producing areas in the United States in 2023 were Texas, followed by the offshore federal zone of the Gulf of Mexico, then North Dakota and New Mexico.

The United States became the largest producer of crude oil of any nation in history in 2023. Natural gas production reached record highs. Employment in oil and gas extraction peaked at 267,000 in March 1982, and totaled 199,500 in March 2024.

Despite petroleum's many uses from its large scale production, it comes with issues surrounding the environment and human health. Oil spills are a source of pollution and there is heavy water usage for oil production. Use of petroleum products generates greenhouse gas emissions.

== Industry structure ==
The United States oil industry is made up of thousands of companies, engaged in exploration and production, transportation, refining, distribution, and marketing of oil. The industry is often informally divided into "upstream" (exploration and production), "midstream" (transportation and refining), and "downstream" (distribution and marketing). The industry sector involved in oil exploration and production is for all practical purposes identical with the sector exploring and producing natural gas, but oil and natural gas have different midstream and downstream sectors (see: Natural gas in the United States).

=== Majors ===
The term major oil company has no formal definition, but usually refers to a large vertically integrated company, with operations in all or most of the industry phases, from exploration to marketing. Many majors have international operations.

The largest of the majors are sometimes called supermajors. This term is often applied to BP, Shell, ExxonMobil, Chevron, and Total, all of which operate in the US. These supermajors greatly contribute to climate change and the world's carbon footprint. These companies make up 23% of the cumulative global carbon footprint and 35% of the global carbon footprint when it comes to petroleum products.

However, the oil supermajors ignore and deny their impact on climate change. Since the 1970s, for the American Petroleum Institute, large oil companies have been aware of their impact on global emissions. History of Science research fellow Geoffrey Supran said, "The takeaway message across all of our work is that over and over, ExxonMobil has misled the public about climate change by telling the public one thing and then saying and doing the opposite behind closed doors".

In more recent years, supermajors have changed their public opinions from blatant climate denial, by changing the language they use when making public statements with tactics such as greenwashing.

For example, ExxonMobil has made claims to be carbon neutral by 2050, however they have taken no steps to do so and blames the public. Chief executive of ExxonMobil Darren Wood says "The people who are generating those emissions need to be aware of and pay the price for generating those emissions. That is ultimately how you solve the problem.", putting accountability on oil users instead of the oil companies. Other companies have done a similar thing; publicly showing support against climate change and emissions and their plans which shape the way the public views climate change due to their immense power. BP, for example, is the company that popularized the term carbon footprint, which Mark Kaufman, former park ranger and now climate journalist, has argued is misplaced blame.

=== Independents ===
An independent is a company which has all or almost all of its operations in a limited segment of the industry, such as exploration and production, refining, or marketing. Although most independents are small compared to the majors, there are some very large companies which are not vertically integrated, and so are classed as independents.

=== Service companies ===
Service companies contract to oil companies to perform specialized services. Examples are companies that do well logging (Schlumberger), seismic surveys (WesternGeco, CGG (company)), drilling (Nabors Industries, Helmerich & Payne), or well completion (Baker Hughes, Halliburton). There are innumerable small oil (craft oil) producers whose aggregate crude oil production exceeds the aggregate production of major crude oil companies.

Top oil producers in the United States, 2009
Rank	Company	Million Bbl/Year
1	BP	237.0
2	Chevron	177.0
3	ConocoPhillips	153.0
4	ExxonMobil	112.0
5	Occidental Petroleum	99.0
6	Shell	71.0
7	Anadarko Petroleum	63.0
8	Apache Corporation	34.8
9	XTO Energy	31.7
10	Amerada Hess	26.0
Annual owned production, 2009. Source:

In 2009, the production owned by the top ten companies was 52% of total US oil production.

== Exploration ==
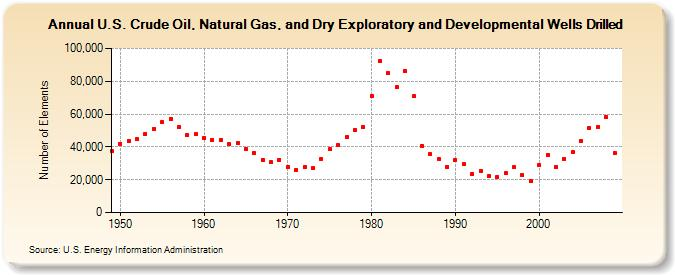
Number of wells drilled for oil and gas through 2009

Exploratory drilling, seismic and other remote sensing techniques are used to explore for and find new hydrocarbon resources. Satellites, remote-sensing devices, and 3-D/4-D seismic technologies are some of these technologies. Smaller "slimhole" drilling rigs are able to drill smaller exploratory wells to reduce the size of the impacted area.

Each year, tens of thousands of wells are drilled in search of oil and gas in the U.S. In 2009, 36,243 wells were drilled.

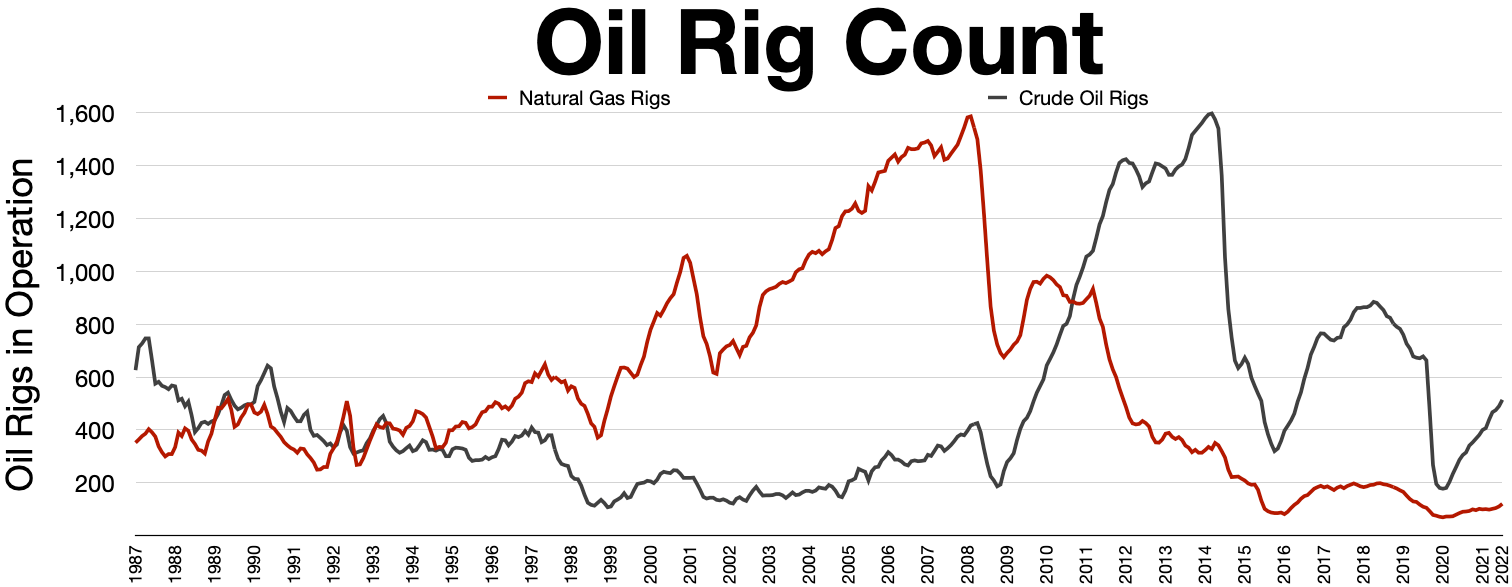
Oil rigs operational Natural gas rigs operational

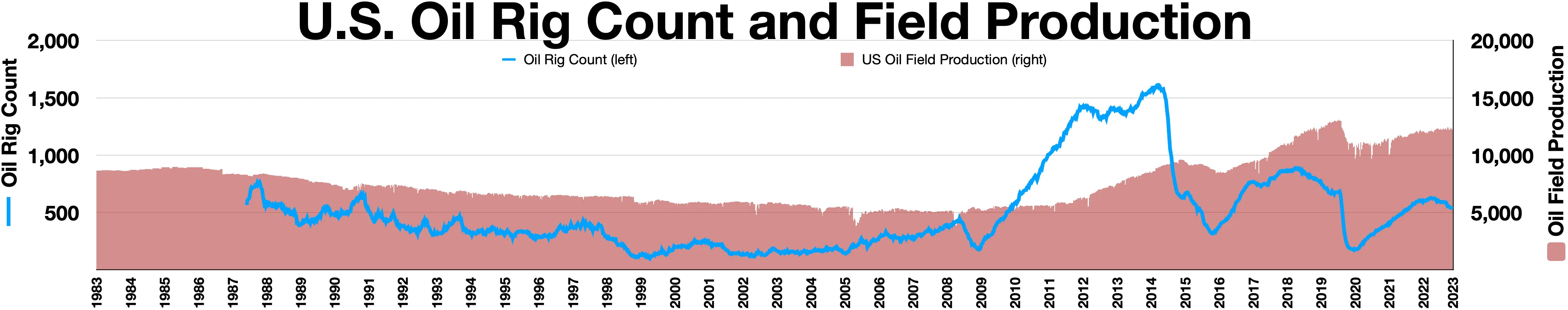
U.S. oil rig count and field production Oil rigs operational U.S. field production

== Production ==
=== Top oil fields in the U.S. ===
Top producing oil fields in the United States, 2019* being updated
Rank	Field	State	Discovery year	Million Bbl/day
1	Permian	Texas/New Mexico	1920	4.2
2	Eagle Ford Shale	Texas	2008	1.34
3	Bakken	North Dakota/Montana	1951	1.33
4	Prudhoe Bay Oil Field	Alaska	1967	.791
5	Wattenberg Gas Field	Colorado	1970	.473
6	Shenzi	Federal Gulf of Mexico	2002	.353
7	Kuparuk River oil field	Alaska	1969	.295
8	Midway-Sunset Oil Field	California	1901	.288
9	Atlantis Oil Field	Federal Gulf of Mexico	1998	.273
10	Sugarkane	Texas	2009	.258
Annual production 2013. Source:

Of the top oil fields mentioned above, four of the ten are on Native land. The Permian fields in Texas are on Comanche, Kiowa, and Cheyenne-Arapaho land. The Bakken oil field in North Dakota is on Mandan, Hidatsa and Arikara land. The Kuparuk oil field in Alaska is on Inupiaq land, and the Midway-Sunset oil field is on the Chumash land. According to Steve Lerner, most areas where oil fields are located are considered sacrifice zones and the people that live there expendable.

=== Associated gas ===
Most modern oil fields are developed with plans to utilize both the oil and the associated gas. Associated gas is a by-product of petroleum extraction which is a combination of different greenhouse gases such as methane and carbon dioxide. Due to its flaring during production, it contributes to climate change and releases those gases into the air. Since oil is historically the higher value product, the gas may be viewed as a waste by-product when such plans are delayed, fail, or do not exist. Depending on local regulations, the gas may then be disposed of at the well site in practices known as gas venting and production flaring. In the U.S., a growing volume and percentage of the produced associated gas is intentionally wasted in this way since about year 2000, reaching nearly 50-year highs of 500 billion cubic feet and 7.5% in 2018.

=== Produced water ===
When extracting oil and gas from oil sands and shale oil, water that was present is extracted as well, which is called "produced water". In 2017, an estimated 160 billion gallons of produced water was generated during U.S. shale oil and gas producing operations. Ongoing research seeks to identify safe ways to reuse produced water. The water is usually highly saline, and must be disposed of by injecting it into EPA-permitted Class II water disposal wells.

Some produced water contains sufficient lithium, iodine, etc. to be recovered as a by-product.

== Crude oil transportation and storage ==
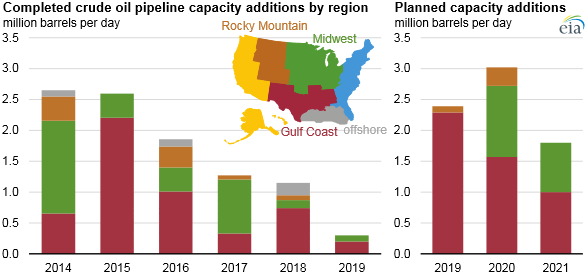
Completed and forecast petroleum pipeline capacity additions by region, 2014–2021, as of May 2019

The product extracted at the wellhead, usually a mixture of oil/condensate, gas, and water, goes through equipment on the lease to separate the three components. The oil and produced water are in most cases stored in separate tanks at the site, and periodically removed by truck. Over the decade 2005–2014, the volume of oil carried to the refinery by tanker ship has decreased. The oil volumes delivered to US refineries by all other modes has increased. Crude oil and petroleum products are transported mainly by pipelines, rail, or water via tanker ships. The U.S. has more than 3 million miles of pipeline dedicated to the transportation of natural gas.

=== Pipeline ===
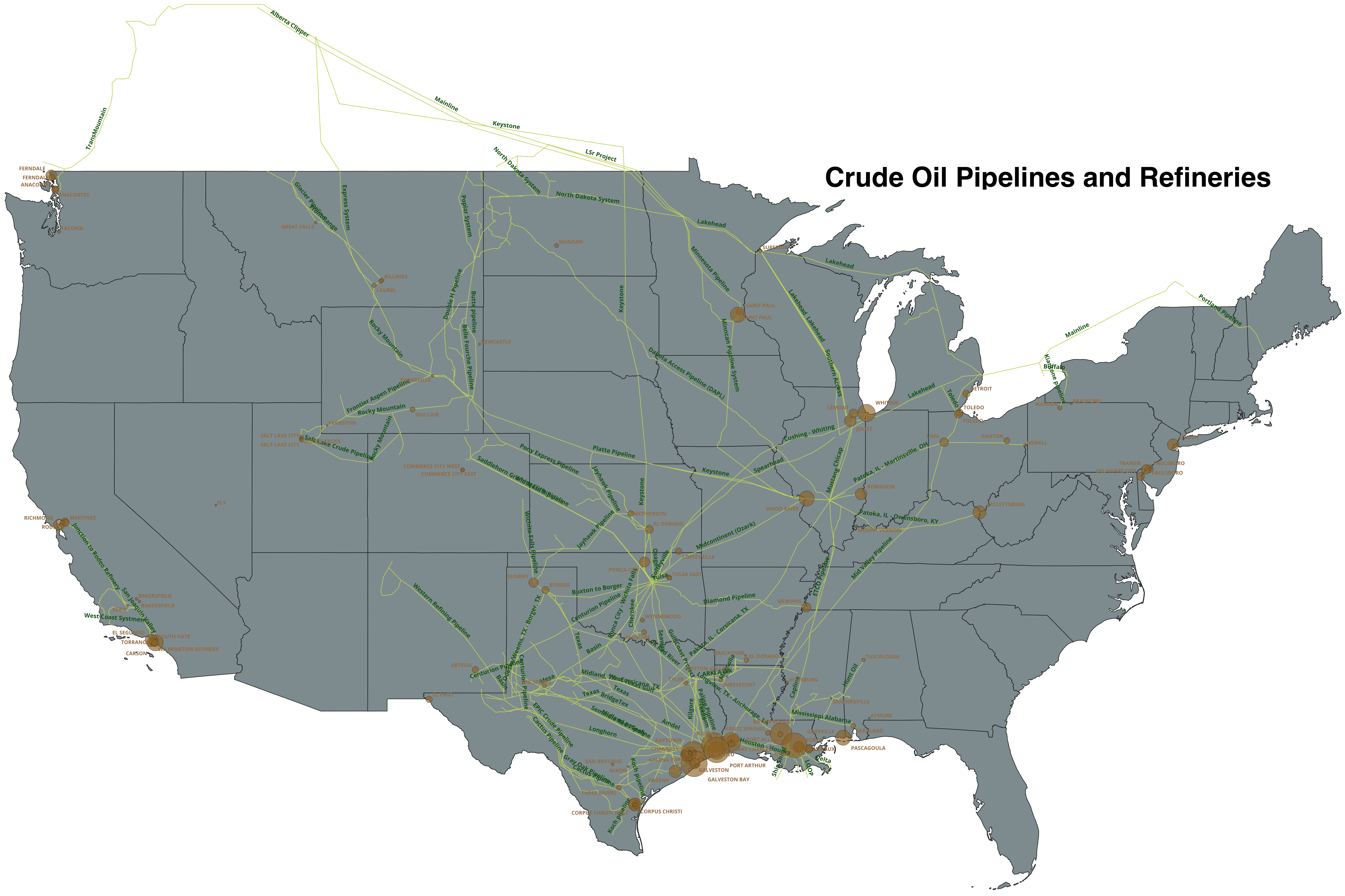
Crude oil pipelines and refineries

Most crude oil shipped long distances in the US goes by oil pipeline. In 2014, 58 percent of the petroleum arriving at refineries came by pipeline, up from 48 percent in 2005. In 2014, the United States had 161 thousand miles of interstate oil pipelines, an increase of 29 thousand miles since 2005. The interstate pipelines are connected to 4.2 million miles of trunk oil pipelines. The top US oil pipeline companies in 2014 were, in order of decreasing interstate pipeline mileage: Magellan Pipeline Company, Mid-America Pipeline Company, and Plains All American Pipeline.

=== Water ===
Petroleum can be transported cheaply for long distances by oceangoing oil tankers. Tankers supplied 31 percent of the oil arriving at US refineries in 2014, down from 48 percent in 2005; the decline reflects decreased oil imports since 2005.

For shorter-distance water transport, oil is shipped by barge, which accounted for 5.7 percent of oil arriving at refineries in 2014, up from 2.9 percent in 2005.

=== Truck ===
Most oil is initially carried off the site by tanker truck. The truck may take the oil directly to a nearby refinery. In 2014, 2.6 percent of oil arrived at refineries by truck, up from 2.6 percent in 2005. If the refinery is not close, the tanker truck will take the crude oil to a pipeline, barge, or railroad for long-distance transport.

=== Railroad ===
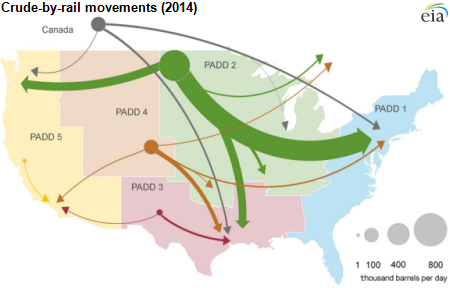
Schematic map of crude oil shipments by rail in the US in 2014 (US EIA)

Before the common availability of long-distance pipelines, most crude oil was shipped by rail. It is for this historical reason that in Texas, oil and gas production came to be regulated by the Texas Railroad Commission. Rail transport of crude oil has made a resurgence since 2005, largely due to the lack of pipeline capacity to transport the increased oil volumes from North Dakota. In 2014, 2.7 percent of crude oil arriving at refineries came by rail, up from 0.1 percent in 2005.

Since 2012, oil shipped by rail from the Bakken fields in North Dakota has progressively replaced overseas (non-Canadian) imported oil used by East Coast US refineries. In February 2015, railroads supplied 52 percent of all crude oil delivered to US refineries on the East Coast.

Rail transportation also resulted in the July 6, 2013 Lac-Mégantic rail disaster while transporting oil from the North Dakota Bakken Formation, killing 47 people in Lac-Mégantic and destroying half the buildings in the city's downtown.

=== Storage ===
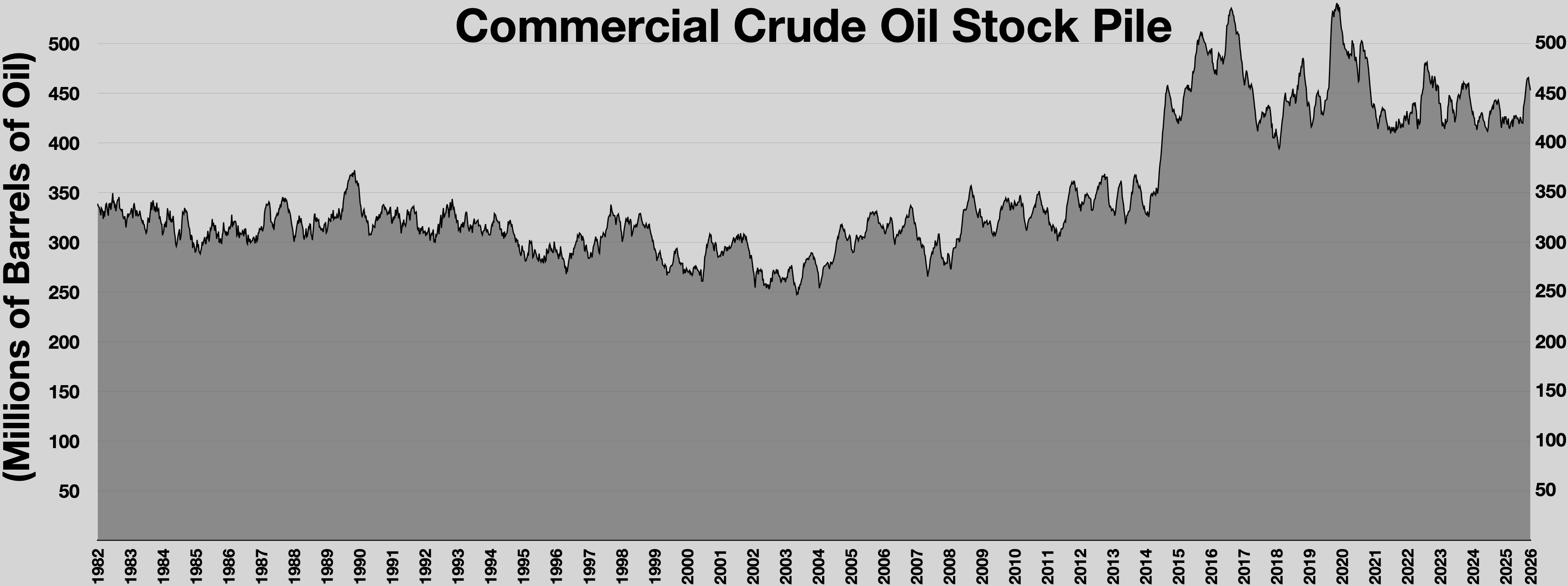
Commercial crude oil stock pile

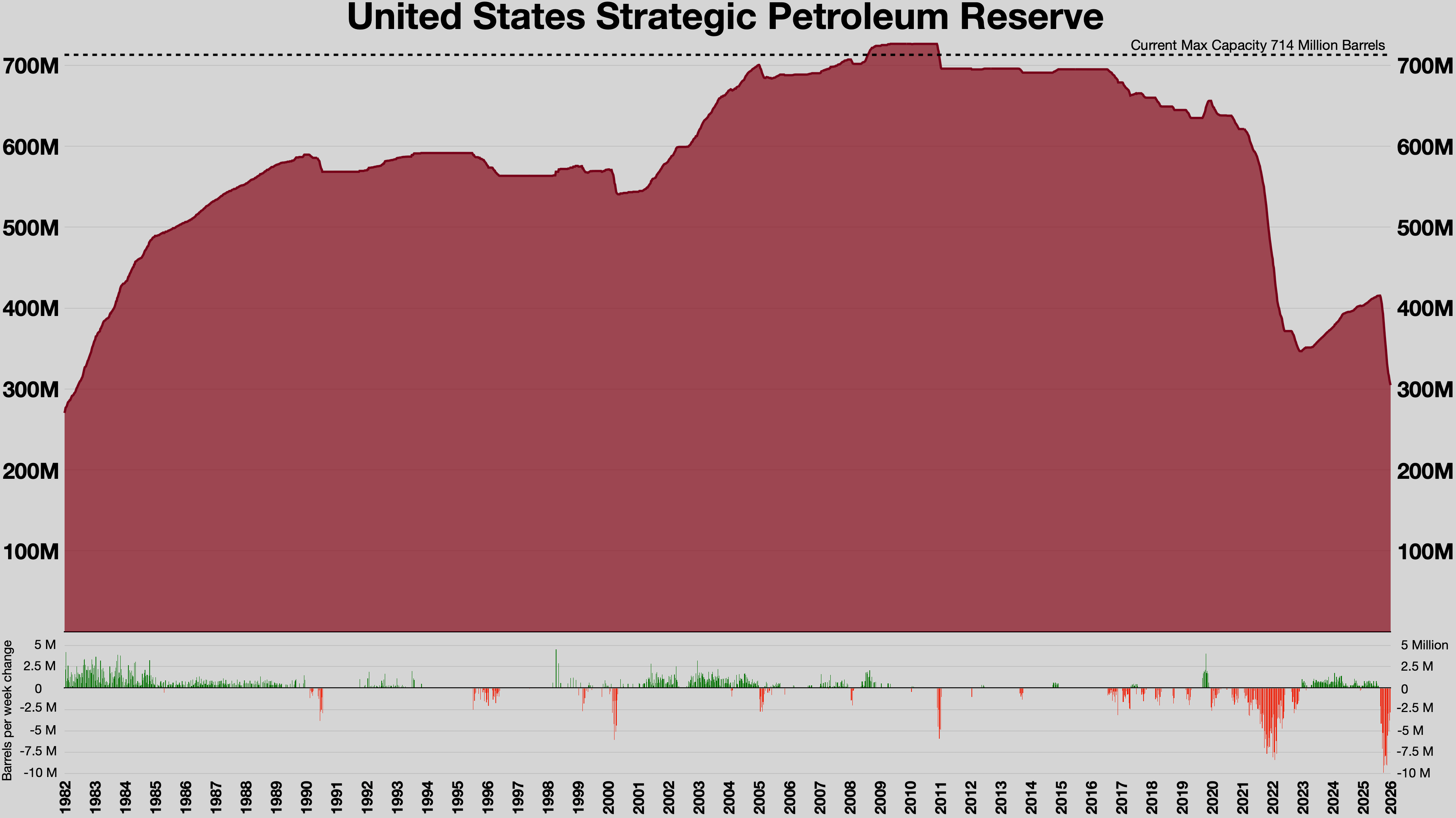
Strategic Petroleum Reserve (United States) Barrels of oil

Crude oil is stored in oil terminals above ground, natural gas storage is primarily done underground. Private companies store oil and participate in the oil-storage trade to try and get the best deal on their oil. Governments also store oil in Strategic Petroleum Reserves to cope with Geopolitical /economic shocks.

== Refining ==
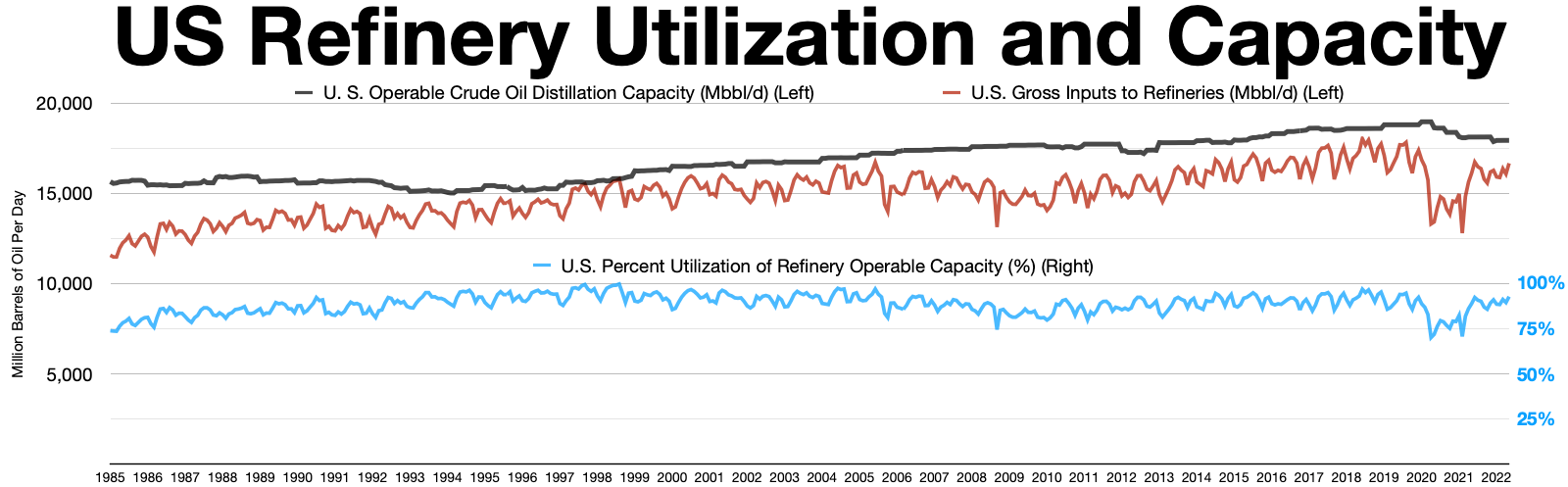
US oil refinery capacity US oil refinery distillation capacity (left) Gross inputs to refineries (left) Percent utilization of refinery operable capacity (right)

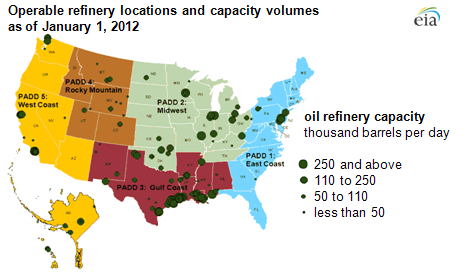
Location of United States petroleum refineries, 2012

The United States petroleum refining industry, the world's largest, is most heavily concentrated along the Gulf Coast of Texas and Louisiana. In 2012, US refiners produced 18.5 million barrels per day of refined petroleum products. Of this amount, 15 percent was exported. As of 2012 the US was the world's second largest net exporter of refined petroleum products.

== Petroleum product distribution and marketing ==
Refined petroleum products destined for retail consumption is transferred to bulk terminals by pipeline, barge, or rail. From the bulk terminal, the product is usually trucked to the retail outlets.

As of February 2014, there were 153,000 service stations selling motor fuel in the US, including garages, truck stops, convenience stores, and marinas. Although many stations carry the brands of major integrated oil companies, only 2% of US stations are owned by major oil companies; most stations labeled with major brands are operated under franchise agreements. A total of 58% of the service stations are single-store operations run by an individual or family.

== Price ==
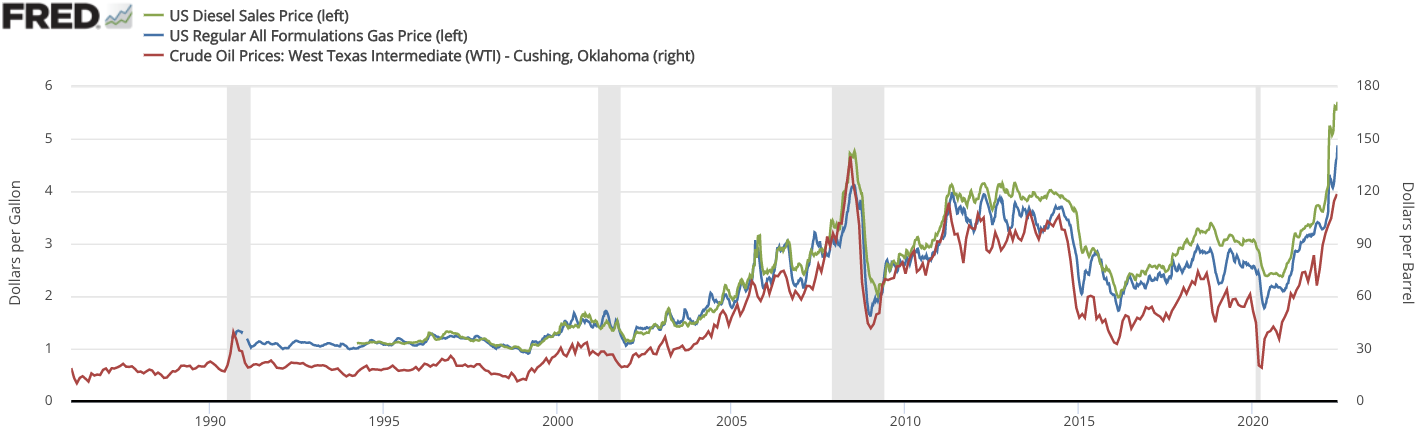
Diesel fuel (left) Gasoline (left) Crude oil price (WTI) (right)

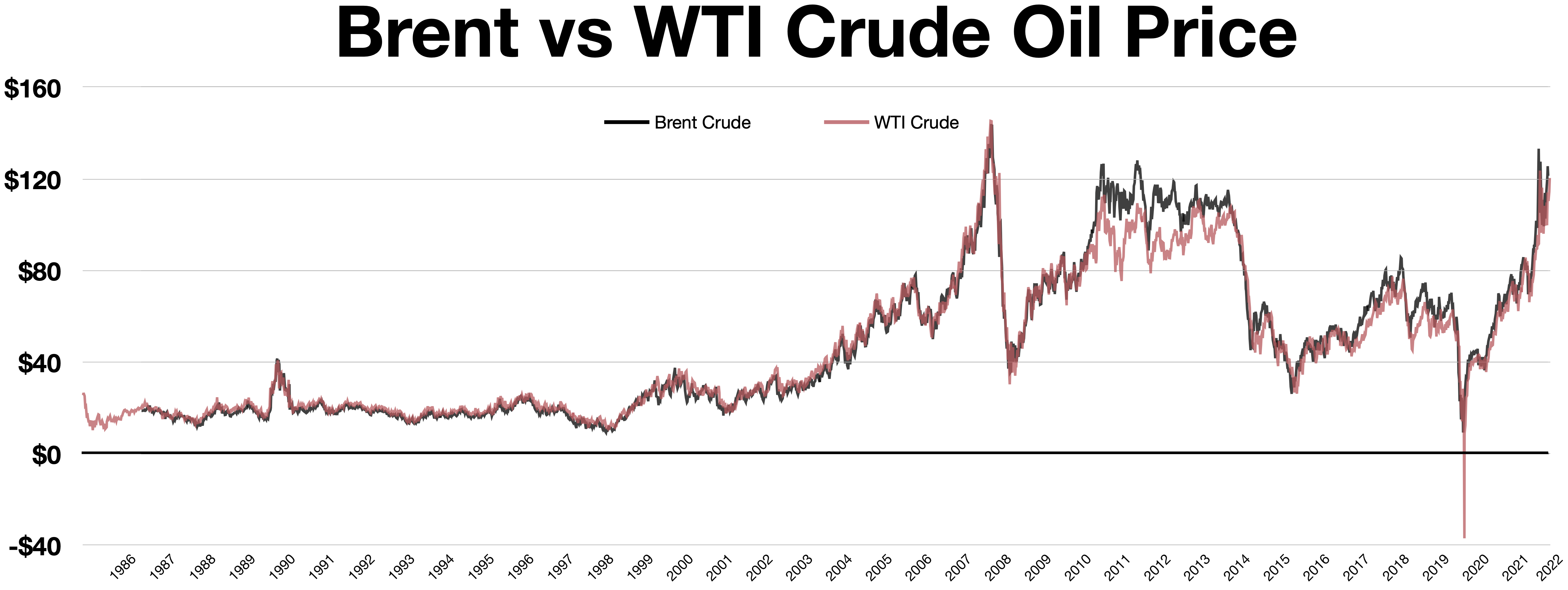
Brent Crude West Texas Intermediate

Except for one, every US recession since World War II experienced a sharp increase in the price of oil. This correlation strongly signifies the US dependency of oil for the economy and oil's importance in US development for most of the time since the war. Many of the key cases of crude oil price increases in the post-war period were associated with political upheaval from oil rich countries. Domestic production and consumption were outpaced by US demand toward the late 1960s, and Middle Eastern nations gained a significant amount of political leverage in controlling prices based on their production. Price increases have been directly related to increased investment and subsequent oil production. After World War II, European reconstruction through the Marshall Plan was the primary objective of the American economy, and investment eventually rose after a long-term price increase at the end of the war. In the 1950s, there were strikes by oil workers, production restrictions imposed by the Texas Railroad Commission, as well as the Suez Crisis and Korean War—all creating steep price increases, with prices only falling after production could meet demand. Peak Oil in the US caused a definite decline of American reserves and several more strikes by oil workers. Additional singular events such as the OPEC embargo, the rupture of the Trans-Arabian Pipeline, and Iranian Nationalization of the oil industry resulted in further never-before-seen price increases. Each case was followed by a marked recession in the US economy.

In 2008, oil prices rose briefly, to as high as $145 per barrel, and U.S. gasoline prices jumped from $1.37 to $2.37 per gallon in 2005, causing a search for alternate sources, and by 2012, less than half the US oil consumption was imported. However, as of January 2015, the price of oil has decreased to around $50 per barrel. As of September 2021, the price per barrel of crude oil was $69.06.

Oil futures dropped on 5 August 2024, due to U.S. recession fears and concerns about Chinese demand, with Brent and WTI falling over 1%. OPEC+ plans to increase supply added pressure, while geopolitical risks in the Middle East limited further losses.

== Consumption and production ==
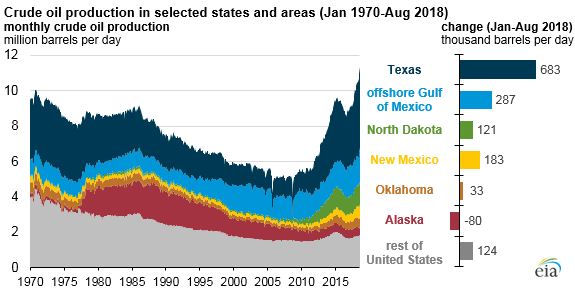
Sources of US crude oil

In the twentieth century, oil production became of more value, as the US industrialized and developed commercial transportation, such as railroads and motor vehicles. Furthermore, oil consumption also increased because of electricity. After electricity, oil became more important in commercial, manufacturing, and residential sectors such as heating and cooking. Therefore, during this period, the growth of oil consumption indicates that the US was becoming dependent on oil and that it helped the domestic oil industry to grow. However, U.S. oil domestic production could not cover the growing demand in the nation's market, which allowed the U.S. to look for a new supply internationally.

The nation's consumption of oil increased 53% between 1915 and 1919, followed by another increase of 27% in 1920. The first shock of the transportation era occurred in 1920 and lasted for about a year. The shortage of oil devastated the entire West Coast with hour-long lines for gasoline. Also, in many places, fuel was not available for at least a week. Finally, big production from Texas, California, and Oklahoma took the shortage of oil away, causing oil prices to fall 40% between 1920 and 1926. During the Great Depression, both growing supply and falling demand caused the price of oil to decrease to about 66% between 1926 and 1931.

Toward the end of World War II, the automotive era settled rapidly, and the nation's demand of oil increased 12% between 1945 and 1947 while motor vehicle registrations did so by 22%. Around 1948, demand of oil exceeded the supply of oil, causing the U.S. to start importing oil. Therefore, the nation quickly became a major importer of oil, rather than being the major exporter for it.

In 1952, due to a strike by US oil refinery workers, both the US and the United Kingdom cut 30% of fuel delivery to civilian flights, while Canada postponed all private flights. Until the 1960s, the price of oil was relatively stable, and the world market could cover the excess demand of oil in the U.S. However, in 1973, the price of oil increased due to the Arab oil embargo against the U.S., following the nation's support of Israel in the Yom Kippur War. During that time, Arab oil producers reduced production by 4.4mb/d for two months, 7.5% of global output. During this time, people reduced their consumption of oil by turning down thermostats and carpooling to work, which together with the lower demand due to the 1973-75 recession, resulted in a reduction in oil consumption.

After the oil crisis of 1973, the price of oil increased again between 1979 and 1980 due to the Iranian revolution. This crisis was related to political instability in a major oil-exporting region. During this period, oil consumption decreased because of new efficiency. At that time, cars were developed so less oil was required and industrialization was also advanced to reduce oil consumption. This caused a decline in U.S. demand of oil and reduced the amount of international imports. The last energy crises in the U.S. occurred in 1990. This occurred due to Iraq's invasion of Kuwait. Similar to the previous crisis, price of oil increased and oil consumption decreased but by a smaller amount and had a smaller effect.

In 2010, 70.5% of petroleum consumption in the U.S. was for transportation. Approximately 2/3 of transportation consumption was gasoline. Today, the U.S. is still dependent on oil, as oil plays an important role socially, economically, and politically.

In May 2019, the United States produced a record 12.5 million barrels of oil per day and it is expected to reach to a record 13.4 million barrels per day by the end of 2019.

In 2020, U.S. refineries produced about 18.375 million barrels of petroleum products per day. Crude oil making up 11.283 million barrels, natural gas liquids making up 5.175 million barrels, and other petroleum products making up the rest.

== Policy ==
Regulation of the oil market has played a major role in the substance's history. Policies affect the market in several ways, such as price, production, consumption, supply and demand. The oil market has had a history of booms and troughs, which have caused producers to demand government intervention. Usually, this government involvement only made the situation worse. One example of government intervention of petroleum deposits on Native land is the Osage Oil Crisis. In the late 1800's on the Osage reservation, oil deposits were found. The Bureau of Indian Affairs negotiated to give drilling rights to oilmen as a promise that Osage citizens who lived on deposits would receive ten percent of the royalties from the oil. When the Osage negotiated to keep their headrights to the oil, Congress required that they pass a competency test to prove they could handle the funds. If they were not deemed competent, they were provided U.S. citizens as "guardians". Many Osage were people conned out of their contract by dishonest lawyers and businessmen. Many more Osage were murdered by their guardians. Eventually, over sixty Osage died as a result of oil prospectors working alongside the U.S. government to gain headrights to Osage oil claims.

Furthermore, many of the regulations were quickly ruled illegal and removed. Prior to World War II, many of the issues within the oil market had to do to with changing prices. During the 1920s, oil prices were beginning peaking fears of oil depletion. In response to these fears, during Coolidge's administration, U.S. Congress enacted a depletion allowance to producers which led to a surge of investment in the oil business and the discovery of many new, large oil reservoirs. The next decade featured falling prices caused by the new investment and overproduction. The declining prices allowed producers to demand a price support system. For example, the way prices were propped up was a pro-rationing order made by the Railroad Commission of Texas, which restricted oil production and increased price. This order was soon ruled illegal by federal district court in 1931. The 1930s marked the beginning of large federal intervention in the oil industry and began by creating the National Industrial Recovery Act in 1933, which allowed for natural price competition, instead of agreements between the major producers. However, this act was ruled unconstitutional a year later.

While the time before World War II was filled with issues regarding price, the post-war era had increasing oil imports partly due to the price support established between the 1920s and '30s. The artificially high domestic prices caused a surge of imports from lower priced foreign producers. In 1955, a clause was added to the Reciprocal Trade Act Amendments, which gave the president the power to limit imports of a specific commodity, if that particular commodity was harmful to the nation's security. This clause allowed President Eisenhower to enact oil import quotas in 1959, which ultimately allowed international oil prices to decline. These import quotas restricted international oil companies from the US market, and allowed them to form the OPEC. During the 1970s, President Nixon put many phases of price controls into place. After many new regulations altering the original price control system, President Carter eventually began removing these controls in 1979. During his administration, in response to an energy crisis and hostile Iranian and Soviet Union relations, President Carter announced the Carter Doctrine, which declared that any interference with the nation's interests in the Persian Gulf would be considered an attack on its vital interests. Ronald Reagan later expanded this doctrine. Since the 1990s, the oil market has been free of most regulations.

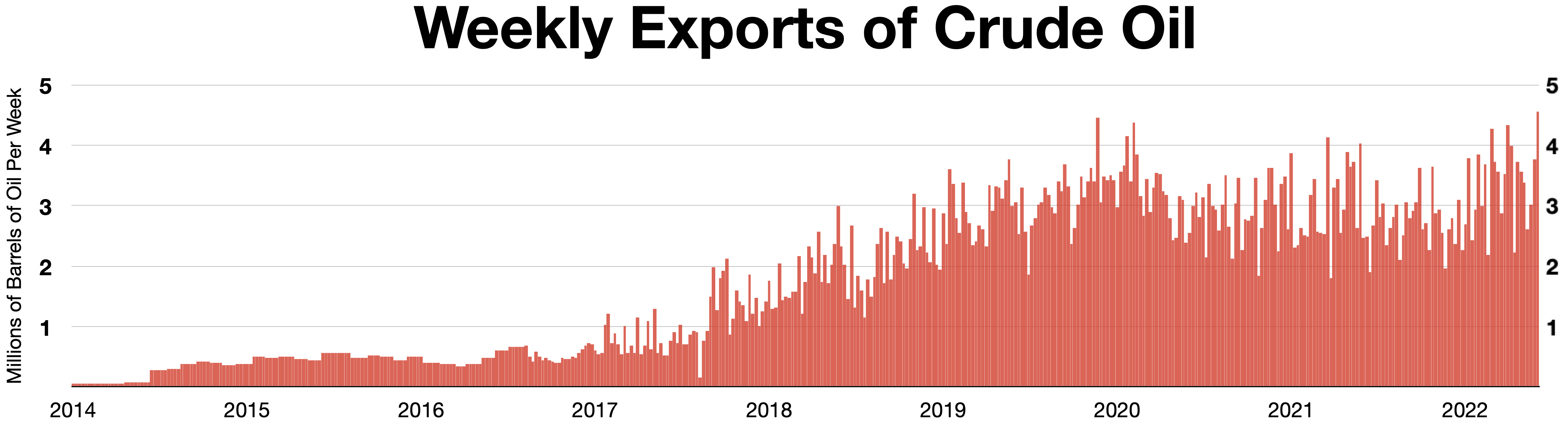
Crude oil exports weekly

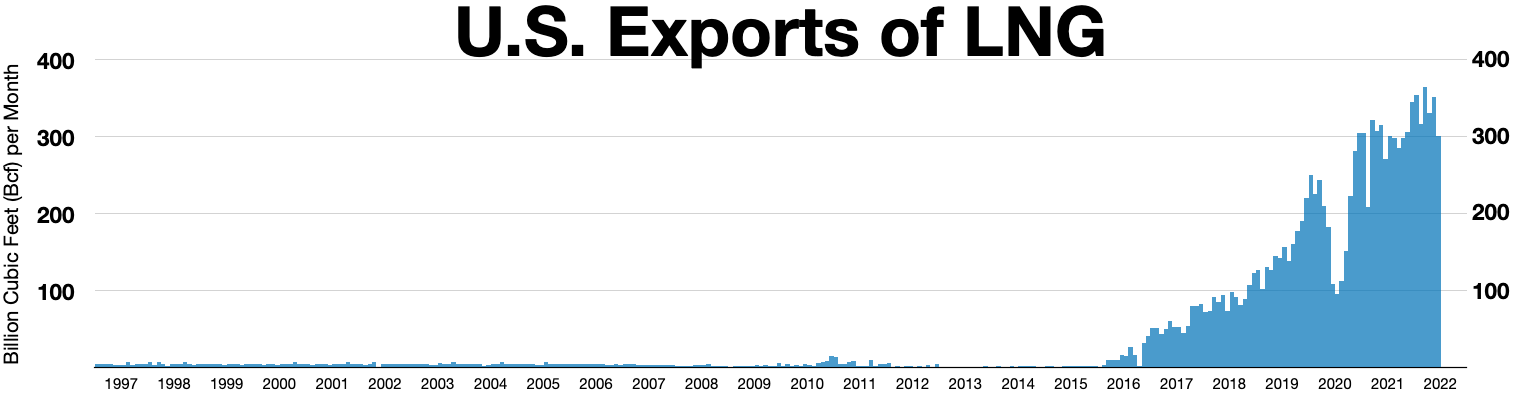
U.S. LNG exports 1997–2022

Natural gas capacity and exports LNG export capacity Calcasieu Pass Elba Island Freeport Cameron Corpus Christi Cove Point Sabine Pass

Near the end of 2015 President Barack Obama signed a spending bill lifting a four decade ban on exports of crude oil.

President Biden and Vice President Harris ran on an environmental platform. The Biden Administration worked to reverse again some previous policies that did not fit their agenda. The goals that President Biden promised consisted of targeting fossil fuels and creating more clean energy sources. This was done through policies such as the Inflation Reduction Act which aimed to tax fossil fuels, petroleum, and reduce and better track emissions from energy production. However, the Biden Administration also made advances in nonrenewable sources that countered their platform. For example, they approved three-fifths of drilling platforms for the Willow Project and ended up approving more oil drilling permits than the Trump Administration did. The platform that they ran on was one to help win over young and environmental voters.

The Trump Administration has plans to accelerate petroleum production. The Administration plans drill for oil on Federal land such as the Arctic National Wildlife Refuge. The Administration withdrew again from the Paris Agreement and declared a national energy. The administration's future projects regarding petroleum include reinstating the previously cancelled Keystone XL pipeline.

The past and present Trump-Administration's fossil fuel plans are critical of climate science and climate change policies. According to David Gelles from the New York Times, many administrations that assist in slowing climate change or its consequences such as FEMA, the EPA, and NOAA have lost funding and their administrations replaced by other climate deniers. The loss of data and research regarding climate change in the United States has isolated the United States from the rest of the world due to the lack of efforts the country is now taking when it comes to Climate Change.

During the 2020 Russia–Saudi Arabia oil price war, the Texas Railroad Commission again discussed pro-rationing to keep oil prices at a level suitable for US producers. Texas ordinarily produces 5.3 million barrels per day, and the US maximum production is 13 million.

== History ==
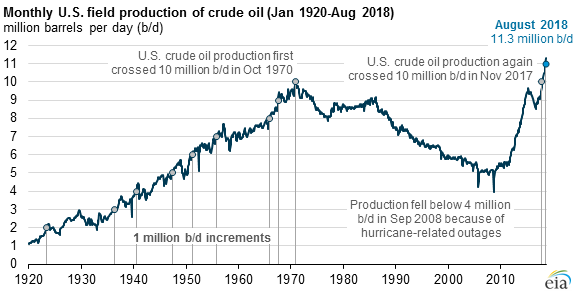
U.S. field production of crude oil, 1920–2018

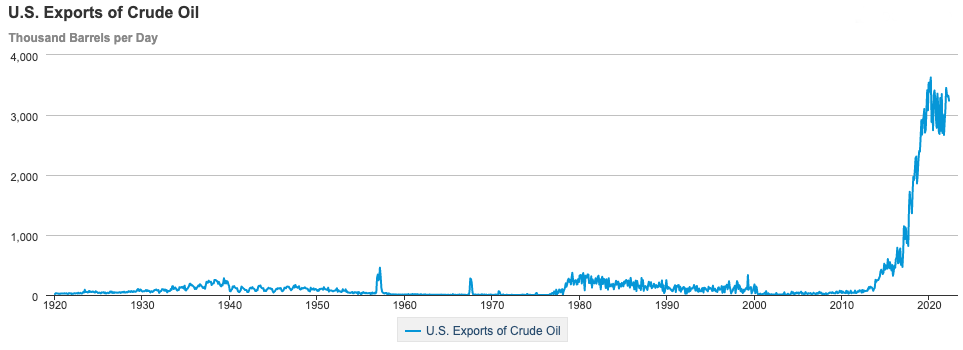
Crude oil exports by the United States, 1920–2022

Crude oil production and imports, 1910–2020

Although some oil was produced commercially before 1859 as a byproduct from salt brine wells, the American oil industry started on a major scale with the discovery of oil at the Drake Well in western Pennsylvania in 1859.

US crude oil production initially peaked in 1970 at 9.64 million barrels (1,533,000 m^{3}) per day. 2018 production was 10.99 million barrels (1,747,000 m^{3}) per day of crude oil (not including natural gas liquids).

- Pennsylvanian oil rush
- Office of Naval Petroleum and Oil Shale Reserves
- Petroleum Administration for Defense District
- Texas wildcatters
- Oil Capital of the World

== Statistics ==
The Energy Information Administration of the United States Department of Energy publishes extensive statistics on the production, importation, and uses of petroleum in the United States.

In 1913, the United States was extracting 65 percent of the world's petroleum. In 1989, the United States contained 5 percent of the world's oil reserves. In 2022, New Mexico produced more oil than Mexico.

US crude oil inventories fell by 1.7 million barrels during the week ending July 10, according to new data EIA data, amid the Iran War.

== Politics ==
In 2007, state severance taxes amounted to $10.7 billion, mostly from oil, gas, and coal. States also received 50 percent of federal onshore oil and gas lease revenues within their borders, and 27 percent of federal offshore oil and gas revenues adjacent to their shorelines; the state share of federal revenues totalled $2.0 billion in 2007.

== Environmental issues ==
According to the Environmental Protection Agency, many environmental risks arise in the extraction, production, and transport of petroleum. Locally, spills and drilling accidents can be detrimental to the environment in which they take place. For example, One of the dangerous possibilities that can happen surrounding petroleum production is an oil spill. Oil spills happen often, though most are small, yet there have been major oil spills that have harmed environments. An example of this was the Exxon Valdez oil spill in the Prince Andrew Sound in Alaska in 1989. 11 million gallons of oil were spilled into the water and is considered one of the largest environmental disasters in American history. The spill killed an immense amount of marine life ranging from whales to sea birds and four species, Killer Whales, Kittlitz's Murrelets, Marbled Murrelets and Pigeon Guillemots have not fully recovered from the spill. In addition to spills, oil rig or drilling accidents can be just as harmful and lead to spills. A famous incident was on the Deepwater Horizon oil rig in the Gulf of Mexico. In 2010 a drilling accident took place there that ended with an explosion of the rig, and it sank into the gulf. The spill caused 4 million barrels of oil to be spilled into the water making it the worst oil spill in United States history. Along with marine life being killed and harmed, eleven people on the oil rig were killed in the explosion. British Petroleum (BP) was the owner of Deepwater Horizon and under the Clean Water Act was penalized for the accident. Many different methods including skimmers, booms, and dispersants were used to clean up the oil over months; however, the marine environment has not recovered from this accident.

Federal policies have been created to limit these accidents. The Clean Air Act was passed in 1963 to set standards for air quality and harm from emissions. In the case of oil, the Clean Air Act monitors greenhouse gas emissions and volatile organic compounds associated with petroleum extraction and other hazardous air pollutants. Companies are required to check their oil pumps, compressors, and wells to make sure they are safe and working properly. Additionally, stationary oil must be reported to be cleaned up to limit exposure to the air. However, many spills have taken place in water and have harmed marine life and those who use those waters. The Clean Water Act was enacted in 1972 to monitor water quality across the country and make sure regulations are being followed. Oil is not allowed to be dumped into water, and all oil storage facilities must send in reports to the government on how they would respond to an oil spill. These acts help to limit the amount of harm the environment faces when it comes to oil accidents.

The Oil Pollution Act was signed in 1990 following the Exxon Valdez oil spill. This act is made to best suit how to respond and prevent oil spills from taking place and contaminating the environment. Like the Clean Water Act, the Oil Pollution Act requires storage facilities to map out what they would do in case of an oil spill. Additionally, this act helps to pay for cleanups if the party who caused the spill does not have the money to clean up the spill. This is done by putting a tax on oil that goes to fund this.

There are human health consequences for minority groups who are in areas near petroleum wells, such as Indigenous. They face issues such as cancer, asthma, and other respiratory issues.

== Petroleum extraction and environmental justice ==
Petroleum wells and extraction zones also affect humans. According to environmental scholar Timothy Donaghy, this becomes an issue of environmental justice because these wells are placed disproportionately in poor communities and communities of color. Donaghy explains that to extract petroleum source it is required to have "'sacrifice zones' which disproportionately impact Black, Brown, Indigenous and poor people". Sacrifice zones are areas that are deemed waste land due to factors such as high pollution already, industrial areas, or where people seem expendable. These areas either displace the people that are currently living there or harm them by slow violence by destroying their land, contaminating their water, and exposing them to dangerous health conditions. Living in these areas are associated with lower lung function, higher rates of asthma, and possibly cancer due to the chemicals from extraction oil.

An example of a sacrifice zone is the Greater Chaco area which covers the Four Corners and is primarily in New Mexico. 91% of this area is used for petroleum and natural gas leasing since it is considered waste land with no value. However, this land is home to many Indigenous tribes, specifically the Navajo tribe. Navajo citizens are disproportionately affected by the wells in their homeland, and they are twice as likely to live near an oil plant as opposed to the rest of the New Mexico population. 30% of Navajo people do not have access to clean running water in their home due to its contamination from oil extraction. Additionally, Indigenous women in this area face sexual violence and have the highest rates of missing and murdered women out of any ethnicity in the country because of the number of men working at these oil fields. For example, while the Navajo suffered greatly from the COVID-19 pandemic, the Mancos-Gallup amendment in 2020 was proposed to add over 3000 new wells. Meetings were held to hear Navajo input, but many were unable to attend because of health issues due to COVID and lack of internet. In response, Kendra Pinto, a Navajo community leader said, "Our culture, our history, our health, our water, cannot be pushed aside for profit".

Sacrifice zones extend into Alaska which has many oil refineries and a large Indigenous population. These Tribes are often subject to industries trying to drill on their land and disrupt their lifestyle and culture. An example of this is the Willow Project which was approved in 2023 by Alaska's largest oil producer, ConocoPhillips. The Iñupiat and Nuiqsut Tribes attempted to sue the Biden Administration to stop the Willow Project from taking place but was unsuccessful. Members of the tribe report smog causing respiratory problems. Additionally, many Alaskan native tribes have connection to the caribou on their land and is a necessity to their lifestyle, but because of the oil refineries they have a more difficult time reaching the caribou, and caribou are exposed to environmental harms. Today, there are still legal challenges that are being faced with this project.

In addition to Indigenous tribes, other minority groups face disproportionate effects. For example, in fracking wastewater disposal wells in Texas are placed in areas where there are higher concentrations of people of color or people living in poverty. A health issue associated with these disposal wells are birth complications and water contamination. In Texas, these disposal wells are placed in historically redlined areas which follows a history of discrimination and environmental racism. Even though this is not a petroleum well, it still an effect of extraction and an area that would be considered a sacrifice zone.

== Organizations ==
- American Association of Petroleum Geologists
- American Petroleum Institute
- Council of Petroleum Accountants Societies
- Nevada Petroleum Society
- United States Oil & Gas Association

== See also ==
- Energy conservation in the United States
- Energy in the United States
- Energy policy of the United States
- History of the petroleum industry in the United States
- Natural gas in the United States
- Offshore oil and gas in the United States
- The Petroleum Dictionary (book)
- Shale gas in the United States

By state:

- California
- Ohio
- Oklahoma
