= Council of Petroleum Accountants Societies =

The Council Of Petroleum Accountants Societies (COPAS) is a non-profit professional organization established in 1961, and concerned with accounting guidelines and practices within the North American petroleum industry.

Though it has no statutory authority, the organization plays a significant role in the industry through its development of model accounting practices that are often incorporated into the joint operating agreements executed between parties involved in petroleum exploration and production.

COPAS also publishes a variety of books and delivers training seminars and workshops.
