= Tüpraş İzmir Oil Refinery =

Oil refinery in İzmir, Turkey

Coordinates: 38°48′00″N 26°56′12″E

- Interactive map of Tüpraş İzmir Oil Refinery
- Location: İzmir, Turkey

Refinery details
- Opened: 1972

Tüpraş İzmir Oil Refinery (Turkish: Tüpraş İzmir Rafinerisi) is an oil refinery in İzmir, western Turkey. It is owned and operated by Tüpraş, the country's only oil refiner with four refineries.

İzmir Oil Refinery is located in Aliağa district of İzmir Province. It became operational in 1972 with an annual crude oil refining capacity of about 5.0 million tonnes. Following investments for expansion and modernization, its annual refining capacity reached 10.0 million tonnes in 1987. After the overhaul works took place in 2007, the capacity increased to 11.0 million tonnes per year. In 2016, the refinery processed crude oil and byproducts of 11.7 million tonnes in total. The products are liquefied petroleum gas (LPG), petroleum naphtha, gasoline, jet fuel (ATF), diesel fuel, base oil, heating oil, fuel oil, asphalt base, wax and some others. İzmir Refinery is the country's only facility, which has a grease production complex with an annual capacity of 400,000 tonnes. In 2016, products in a total of 10.4 million tonnes were sold, being 7.3 million tonnes at domestic markets. The storage capacity of the refinery is 2.51 million tonnes. The facility has a Nelson complexity index of 7.66. 1,353 personnel are employed in the facility.
