= Şırnak Province =

Province of Turkey

Coordinates: 37°26′58″N 42°34′28″E

Şırnak Province Şırnak ili
- Province
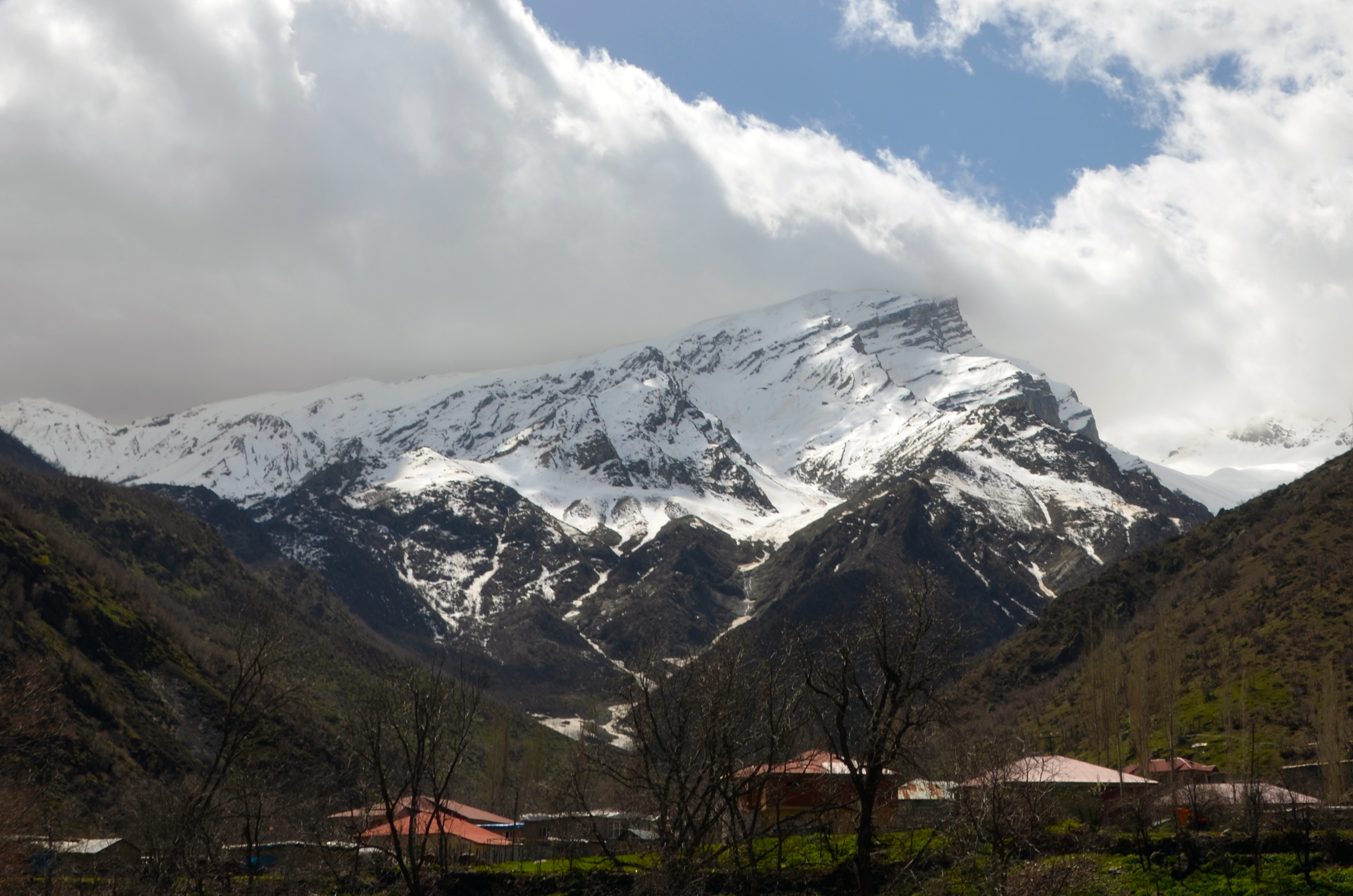
- Beytüşşebap, Uludere dağ

- Location of Şırnak Province in Turkey
- Country: Turkey
- Seat: Şırnak

Government
  - Governor: Birol Ekici
- Area: 7,078 km^{2} (2,733 sq mi)
- Population (2023): 570,745
  - Density: 80.64/km^{2} (208.8/sq mi)
- Time zone: UTC+3 (TRT)
- Area code: 0486
- Website: www.sirnak.gov.tr

Şırnak Province (Turkish: Şırnak ili, Kurdish: Parêzgeha Şirnex) is a province in Turkey in the Southeastern Anatolia Region. Şırnak Province was created in 1990, with areas that were formerly part of the Siirt, Hakkâri and Mardin Provinces. It borders both Kurdistan Region of Iraq and Syria. The current Governor of the province is Cevdet Atay.

The province had a population of 570,745 in 2023. Its area is 7,078 km^{2}. It encompasses 19 municipalities, 240 villages and 192 hamlets.

Considered part of Turkish Kurdistan, the province has a Kurdish majority.

== Geography ==
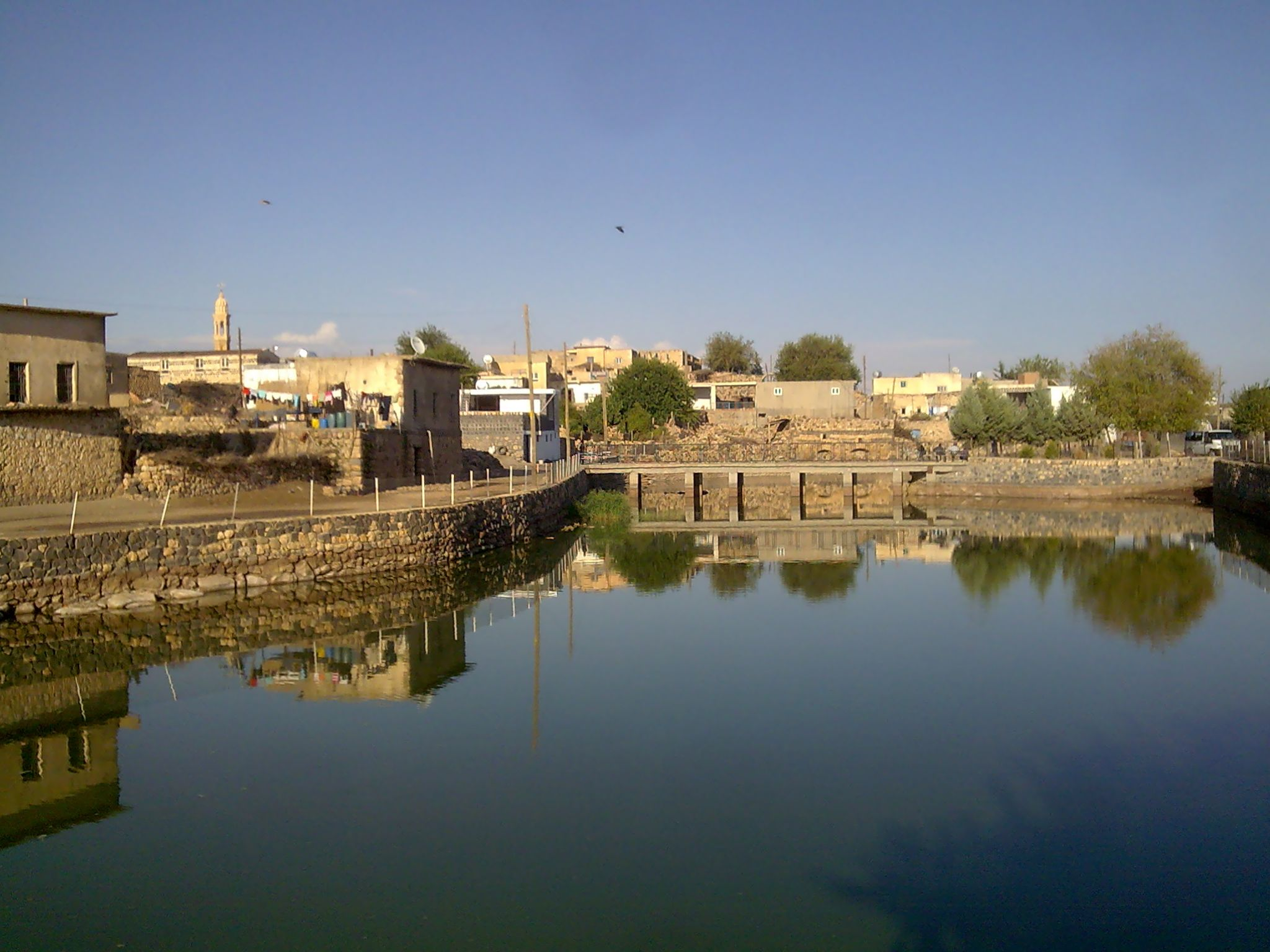
Öğündük (Midin)

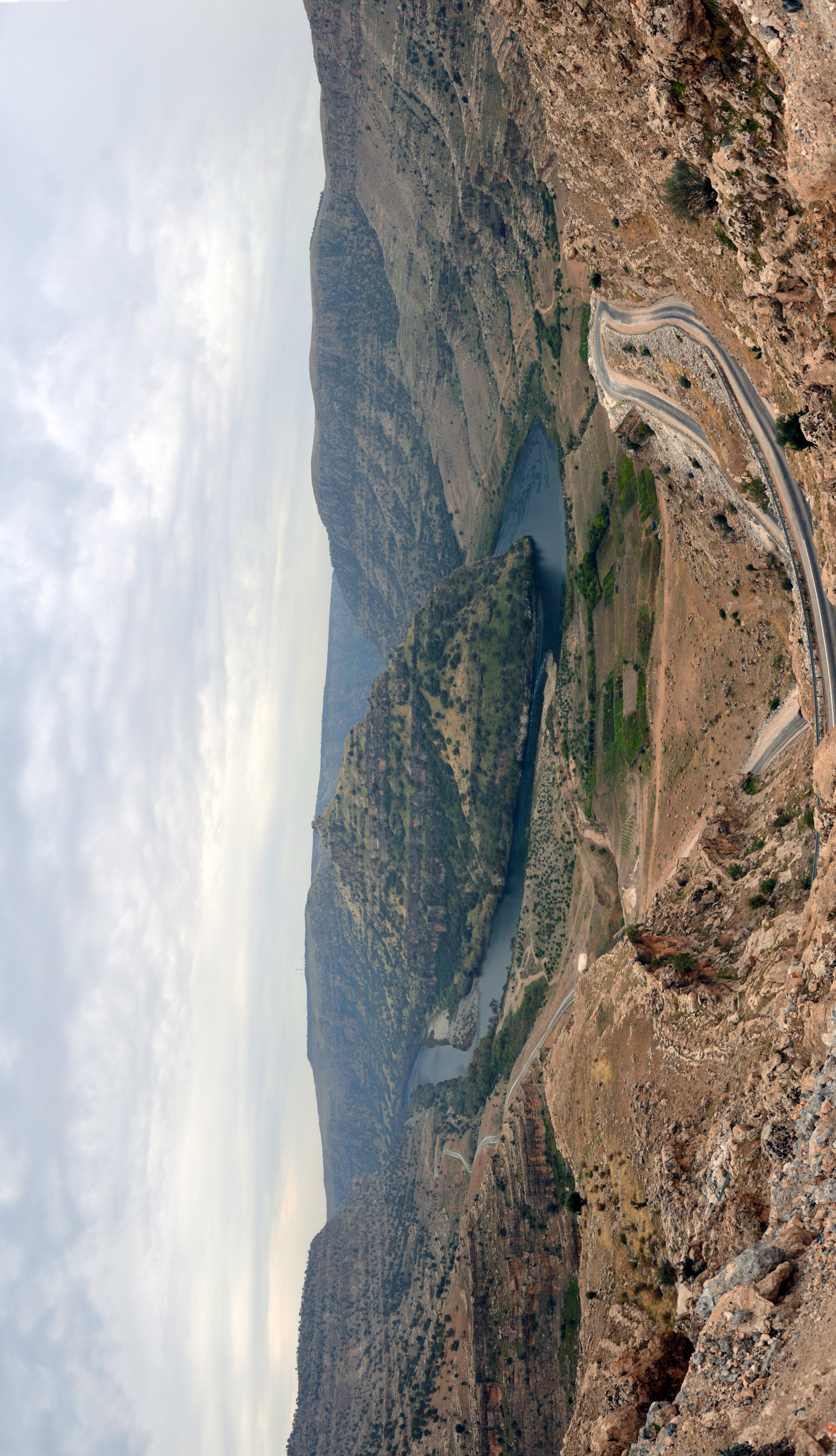
Cehennem Deresi, "Hell's Creek"

Şırnak Province has some mountainous regions in the west and the south, but the majority of the province consists of plateaus, resulting from the many rivers that cross it. These include the Tigris (and its tributaries Hezil and Kızılsu) and Çağlayan. The most important mountains are Mount Cudi (2089 m), Mount Gabar, Mount Namaz and Mount Altın.

=== Districts ===
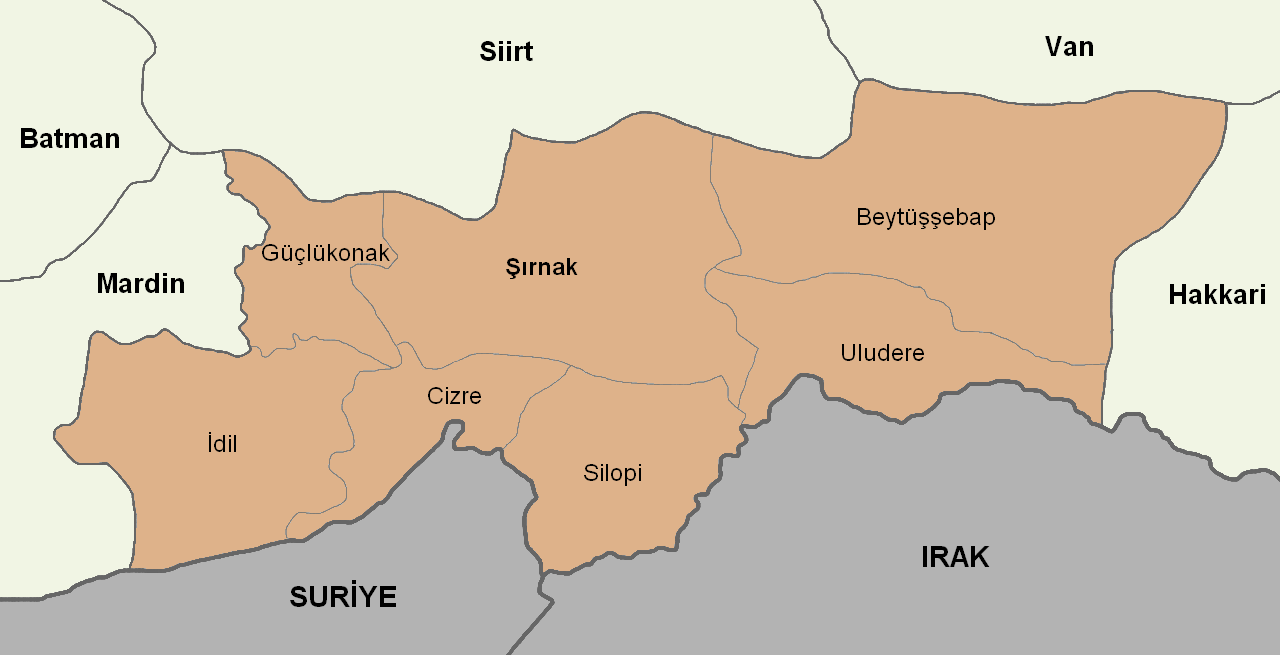

Şırnak province is divided into seven districts (center district in bold):

- Beytüşşebap District
- Cizre District
- Güçlükonak District
- İdil District
- Silopi District
- **Şırnak District**
- Uludere District

== History ==
=== Inspectorate-General ===
In order to Turkify the local population, in June 1927, Law 1164 was passed, which allowed the creation of Inspectorates-General (Umumi Müffetişlik, UM). The province was included in the First Inspectorate General (Turkish: Birinci Umumi Müfettişlik), which covered the provinces of Hakkâri, Siirt, Van, Mardin, Şırnak Bitlis, Sanlıurfa, Elaziğ, and Diyarbakır. The First Inspectorate General was established in January 1928 and had its headquarters in Diyarbakır. The UM was governed by an Inspector General, who governed with a wide-ranging authority over civilian, juridical and military matters. In 1948 the policy of governing the province within the Inspectorate General was abandoned and the administration was not re-employed again, but the office of the Inspector General was only dissolved in 1952 during the government of the Democrat Party.

=== Kurdish-Turkish conflict ===
Şırnak has been a focal point in the ongoing Kurdish-Turkish conflict, which began in 1984. From its creation in 1990 to 2002, Şırnak Province was part of the OHAL (state of emergency) region which was declared to counter the Kurdistan Workers Party (PKK) and governed by a supergovernor, who was given additional powers than a normal Turkish provincial governor, including the power to relocate and resettle whole settlements. In December 1990, the supergovernor and the provincial governors in the OHAL region received absolute immunity from prosecution in connection with decisions they made under Decree No. 430.

==== Turkish Forces' operation, 1992 ====
On 18 August 1992 Turkish forces attacked the city, killing 54 people, mostly children and women. For three days homes were burned, livestock were killed, and people were killed. 20,000 out of 25,000 residents fled the city, Amnesty International reported.

During the operation, a curfew was imposed in the town and when it finally ended, the whole city was in ruins.

While the town was under bombardment, there was no way to get an account of what was happening in the region as journalists were prevented from entering the city centre which was completely burned down by the security forces. Şırnak was under fire for three days and tanks and cannons were used to hit buildings occupied by civilians.

On 26 August 1992, Amnesty International sent requests to then Prime Minister, Süleyman Demirel, Interior Minister İsmet Sezgin, Emergency Legislation Governor Ünal Erkan and Şırnak province governor Mustafa Mala, to immediately initiate an independent and impartial inquiry into the events, to ensure no-one was mistreated in police custody and to make their results public.

==== 2015–2016 Clashes ====
The 2015–16 Şırnak clashes took place in Şırnak City, Cizre, Idil and Silopi. On 14 March 2016 a curfew was declared in Şırnak province. This marked the start of an 80 day long operation against Kurdish PKK militants in the province. The curfew remained in place for 9 months. 2,044 buildings were destroyed during the military operation.

== Population ==
Historic population figures of the province:

Historical population
Year	Pop.	±%
1990	262,006	—
2000	353,197	+34.8%
2010	430,109	+21.8%
2020	537,762	+25.0%
