= Nelson complexity index =

Conversion calculation in petroluem refinery

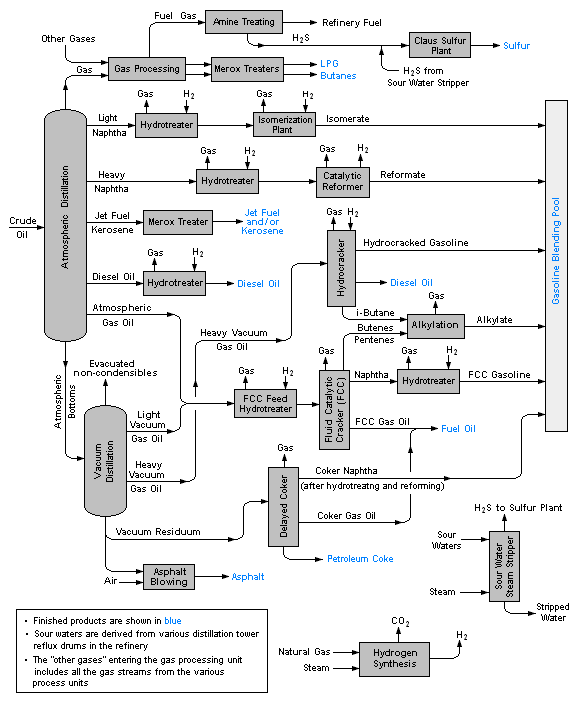
Flows in a very complex oil refinery

The Nelson complexity index (NCI) is a measure to compare the secondary conversion capacity of a petroleum refinery with the primary distillation capacity. The index provides an easy metric for quantifying and ranking the complexity of various refineries and units. To calculate the index, it is necessary to use complexity factors, which compare the cost of upgrading units to the cost of the crude oil distillation unit.

== History ==
It was developed by Wilbur L. Nelson in a series of articles that appeared in the Oil & Gas Journal from 1960 to 1961 (Mar. 14, p. 189; Sept. 26, p. 216; and June 19, p. 109). In 1976, he elaborated on the concept in another series of articles, again in the Oil & Gas Journal (Sept. 13, p. 81; Sept. 20, p. 202; and Sept. 27, p. 83).

== Formula ==
$\text{NCI} = \sum_{i=1}^N F_i \cdot \frac{C_i}{C_\text{CDU}}$

Where:

- $F_i$ is a complexity factor
- $C_i$ is a unit capacity
- $C_\text{CDU}$ is a capacity of crude distillation unit
- $N$ is a number of all units

The NCI assigns a complexity factor to each major piece of refinery equipment based on its complexity and cost in comparison to crude oil distillation, which is assigned a complexity factor of 1.0. The complexity of each piece of refinery equipment is then calculated by multiplying its complexity factor by its throughput ratio as a percentage of crude distillation capacity. Adding up the complexity values assigned to each piece of equipment, including crude distillation, determines a refinery’s complexity on the NCI.

The NCI indicates not only the investment intensity or cost index of the refinery but also its potential value addition. Thus, the higher the index number, the greater the cost of the refinery and the higher the value of its products.

In the second edition of the book Petroleum Refinery Process Economics (2000), author Robert Maples notes that U.S. refineries rank highest in complexity index, averaging 9.5, compared with Europe's at 6.5. The Jamnagar Refinery belonging to India-based Reliance Industries Limited is now one of the most complex refineries in the world with a Nelson complexity index of 21.1.

The Oil and Gas Journal annually calculates and publishes a list of refineries with their associated Nelson complexity index scores.

== Complexity factors ==
Some complexity factors for various processing units:

Unit	1998 Reports	Older Reports
Crude oil distillation unit (CDU)	1.0	1.0
Asphalt	1.5	1.5
Vacuum distillation	2.0	2.0
Thermal processes	2.75	5.0
Catalytic hydrorefining	3.0	3.0
Catalytic reforming	5.0	5.0
Catalytic cracking	6.0	6.0
Catalytic hydrocracking	6.0	6.0
Alkylation / Polymerization	10.0	10.0
Oxygenates	10.0	10.0
Aromatics / Isomerisation	15.0	15.0
Lubricants	60.0	10.0

== Example ==
If an oil refinery has a crude oil distillation unit (CDU) (100 kbd), vacuum distillation unit (60 kbd), and catalytic reforming unit (30 kbd), then the NCI will be 1*(100/100) + 2*(60/100) + 5*(30/100) = 1.0 + 1.2 + 1.5 = 3.7.
