= Deep strike campaign =

Ukrainian long-range attacks on Russia

- Part of the Attacks in Russia during the Russo-Ukrainian War
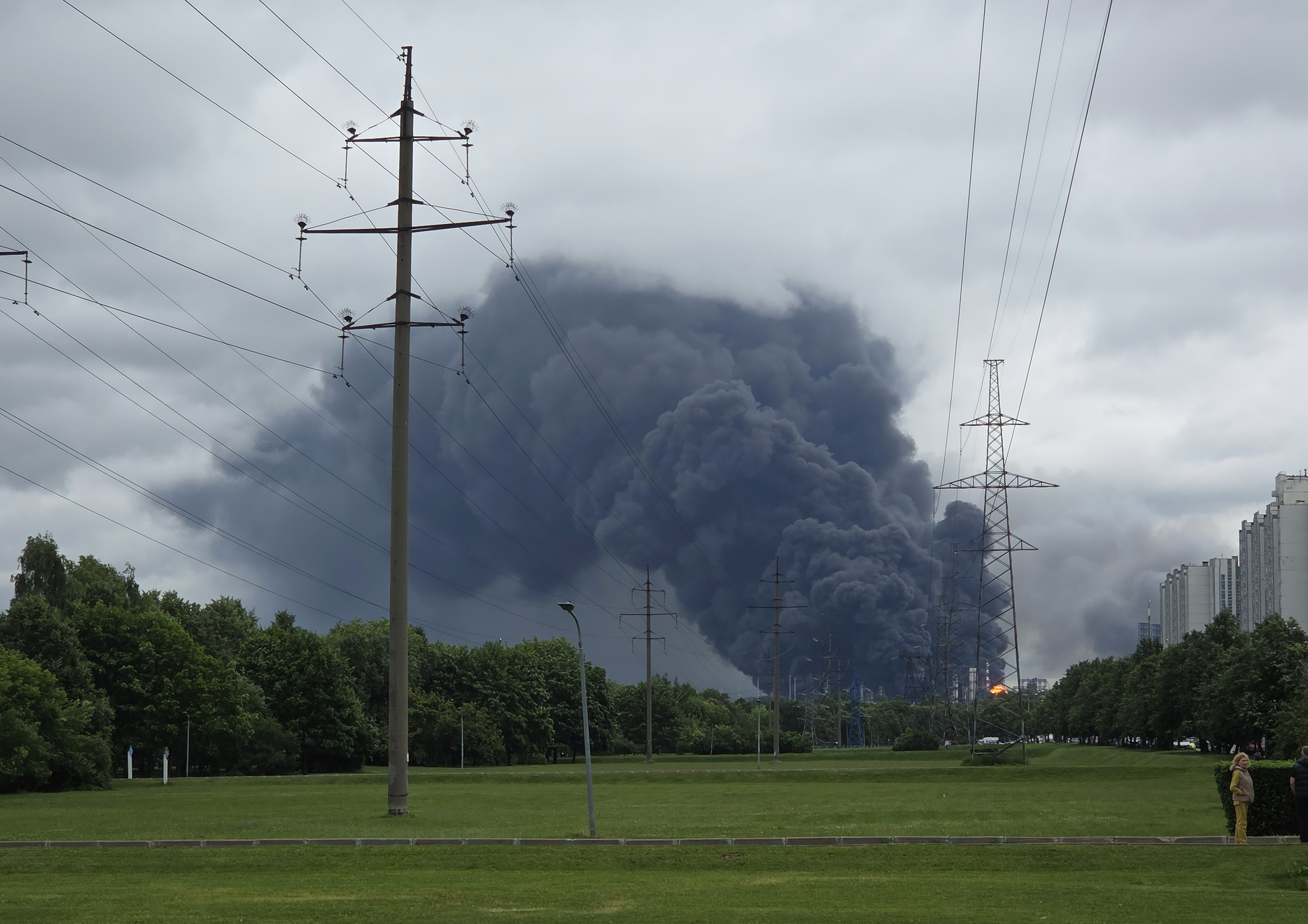
- Fire at the Moscow Oil Refinery in Kapotnya, photographed from Moscow's Brateevo district on 18 June 2026, following a Ukrainian strike
Date	2024 – present (2 years)
Location	Russian Federation
Result	Ongoing

Belligerents
Ukraine	Russia

Commanders and leaders
Volodymyr Zelenskyy (Commander-in-Chief); Oleksandr Syrskyi (Commander-in-Chief, Armed Forces of Ukraine until 21 July 2026); Mykhailo Drapatyi (Commander-in-Chief, Armed Forces of Ukraine from 21 July 2026); Robert "Madyar" Brovdi (Commander, Unmanned Systems Forces)	(Russia) Vladimir Putin (Commander-in-Chief) (Russia) Andrei Belousov (Minister of Defence)

Units involved
(Ukraine) Ukrainian Armed Forces; Unmanned Systems Forces; Long-Range Strike Command (established 10 July 2026)	(Russia) Russian Armed Forces; Russian Aerospace Forces (air defence)

Strength
~200–300 long-range drones launched per night (June 2026); 2,359 deep-strike missions in June 2026, targeting sites 500–2,000 km behind the front line	

The deep strike campaign, or long-range strike campaign, dubbed long range sanctions, is a military campaign by the Defence Forces of Ukraine (Note: The umbrella term "Defence Forces of Ukraine" (sometimes also simply called "the Ukrainian military") refers to all armed institutions of Ukraine engaged in the defence of Ukraine against the military aggression of the Russian Federation. The largest of these, answering to the Ministry of Defence of Ukraine, are grouped into the Armed Forces of Ukraine (ZSU). The ZSU include: the Ukrainian Ground Forces, the Unmanned Systems Forces (USF), the Ukrainian Air Force, the Ukrainian Air Assault Forces, the Ukrainian Navy, the Ukrainian Marine Corps, the Defence Intelligence of Ukraine (HUR), the Special Operations Forces, the Military Police, the Logistics Forces, the Medical Forces, and so on. Reporting to the Ministry of Internal Affairs of Ukraine are: the National Guard of Ukraine (mostly the 1st Azov Corps and the 2nd Khartiia Corps), the Security Service of Ukraine (SBU, known for Operation Spiderweb), and the State Border Guard Service of Ukraine (including the Ukrainian Sea Guard). Many of these organisations have their own drone forces, but are not part of the Unmanned Systems Forces (USF), which in April 2026 accounted for only c. 31.15% of all Russian personnel losses inflicted by Ukrainian drone operations. Certain deep strike drone operations may be carried out through inter-service cooperation; for example, USVs such as the Sea Baby are operated by the Ukrainian Navy, in coordination with the HUR and SBU.) against the logistics of the Russian Federation and the Russian Armed Forces. The campaign involves long-range drone strikes and missile strikes inside Russia, mainly targeting the oil industry and the arms industry. The goal is to undermine Russia's economic ability to continue waging its war against Ukraine. (Note: "The degradation of Russia's oil refining industry and defense-industrial complex directly reduces the aggressor state's military and economic potential. The systematic destruction of Russia's strategic facilities is an effective instrument for exerting pressure on its war machine.") It is part of a broader wave of Ukrainian attacks inside Russia in response to the 2022 invasion.

== Overview ==
"Deep strike" refers to the range of 200 to 1500+ kilometres, for which specialised deep-strike or long-range one-way attack drones have been developed by Ukraine, especially unmanned aerial vehicles (UAVs) such as:

- AN-196 Liutyi – Ukrainian long-range UAV
- Fire Point FP-1 – Ukrainian long-range one-way attack drone
- UJ-25 Skyline – Ukrainian unmanned aerial vehicle
- UJ-26 Bober (drone) – Ukrainian long-range UAV
- Peklo – Ukrainian loitering munition

Certain cruise missiles built by Ukraine or supplied by Ukraine's allies also take part in the deep strike campaign. Although these tend to be much more expensive, and easier to intercept, they carry larger warheads and thus present a greater threat to potential Russian targets:

- FP-5 Flamingo – Ukrainian cruise missile
- R-360 Neptune – Ukrainian family of cruise missiles
- Storm Shadow – Franco-British cruise missile

There are also several types of unmanned surface vehicles (USVs) deployed by the Ukrainian Navy and Ukrainian Marine Corps on the Black Sea against Russia's Black Sea Fleet: (Note: "Ukraine’s deep strike campaign extends to the maritime domain through unmanned surface vehicles (USVs), notably the Magura and Sea Baby. These systems demonstrate sophisticated solutions for operating in E-W-heavy environments... The operational effectiveness of these EW-resilient systems is evidenced by the destruction of approximately one-third of Russia’s Black Sea Fleet, forcing the fleet to withdraw from Sevastopol to Novorossiysk." Hague Centre for Strategic Studies (2026).)

- MAGURA V5 – Ukrainian unmanned boat
- Sea Baby – Ukrainian unmanned surface vehicle

== Objectives ==
The primary targets of Ukraine's deep strike campaign have been the petroleum industry in Russia and military assets of the Russian Armed Forces, as well as ports and airports. The export of hydrocarbons, mostly oil and gas, has been the Russian government's main source of revenue used for military spending on the war. A secondary objective has been to put pressure on the civilian population of Russia (also called "bringing the war back to Russia"), which through a mixture of acquiescence and participation keeps enabling the Kremlin's military aggression against Ukraine. On 8 October 2026, after another successful drone strike on the Omsk refinery, one of Russia's largest oil refineries, the General Staff of the Armed Forces of Ukraine stated: "The destruction of such facilities is the exercise by Ukraine of its inalienable right to self-defence in accordance with Article 51 of the UN Charter and is aimed at reducing the military-economic potential of the Russian Federation".

== History ==
=== Summary of 2022–2026 ===
The deep strike campaign began in early 2024, with a few dozen pilotless aircraft per month. By June 2026, Ukraine was launching an average of 200 to 300 drones against targets in the Russian Federation every night, divided in several groups per strike.

War year	Number of strikes on Russia's oil facilities	
War year	In year	Cumulative
1st	3	3
2nd	13	16
3rd	92	108
4th	138	246
Feb '26– Jun '26	59	305

According to a 25 June 2026 analysis by CNN, Ukraine had struck Russian oil facilities over 300 times since the start of Russia's full-scale invasion on 24 February 2022. Only 3 strikes were performed in the first year of the war (February 2022 to February 2023), with an additional 13 in the second year. Ukraine's attacks on Russia's oil infrastructure only really took off in 2024, with a cumulative total of 108 hits after three years of war, 246 after four years, and a total of 305 strikes when including 24 February 2022 to 25 June 2026.

=== In 2025 ===
A substantial increase in targeted attacks by Ukraine on Russian energy infrastructure began in the second half of 2025. According to media reports, Ukraine carried out over a dozen drone attacks on Russian oil infrastructure between 2 and 24 August, the majority of them striking facilities in Ryazan Oblast and Volgograd Oblast in southwestern Russia. On 27 August, Ukrainian media reported that the Ryazan refinery, one of the main fuel arteries to Moscow, had been struck by a powerful explosion. Boris Aronstein, an independent oil and gas analyst, said that the Ukrainian drone strikes had caused "the most severe crisis in recent years", adding that the size, coordination and repeated waves of the drones makes Russia unable to repair the refineries before the next attack occurs. According to Reuters, Crimea and Russia's far east were the first territories to experience gasoline shortages in August.

2025–2026 Ukrainian strikes
on Russia's oil industry
⬤ Oil refinery
⬤ Other oil infrastructure

In September 2025, Reuters reported that Russia was seeing certain fuel grade shortages, with the reduced refinery runs caused by the drone attacks and high borrowing costs leading to private filling stations being unable to stockpile fuel according to retailers and traders. According to Reuters, the attacks on some days had reduced Russian oil refining by almost a fifth, and cut exports from key ports. According to five retailers and traders in the Russian fuel market during September, problems from the shortages started to emerge in the Volga river region and in southern and central Russia as well. On 29 September, Forbes reported that the issues with fuel had worsened quickly and spread across much of the country, with rising prices, rationing, long queues and pumps running dry in some cases.

In October 2025, BBC Verify and BBC Russian reported that Ukrainian drone attacks reached a record level of 14 refineries targeted in August, while eight had been targeted in September and 12 in August, and that 21 out of Russia's 38 large refineries had been hit since January 2025. Meduza reported that some gas stations were shutting down altogether due to being unable to raise prices because of antitrust restrictions. In Crimea, Russian occupation officials limited gasoline sales to 20 liters per customer and imposed price caps.

=== In 2026 ===
According to a 17 June 2026 analysis by The Economist, Ukraine had conducted 685 deep strikes in 2025, and was on track to complete over 800 deep strikes in 2026 at the current pace, indicating a significant intensification.

In early July 2026, Euromaidanpress quoted the Pilotless Systems Forces of Ukraine as saying they had increased successful strikes deep inside Russian-held territory by 1,150% since the beginning of 2026.

The deepest strike so far has been the 7 July 2026 drone attack on the Omsk refinery, Russia's largest oil refinery, located almost 2,500 kilometres from Ukraine.

On 26 August, the Kstovo refinery (NORSI) was hit once again, forcing Lukoil to halt processing crude oil once more.

==== Attack on an Iranian commercial vessel ====
On 25 July 2026, Ukraine claimed responsibility for an attack on an Iranian-linked vessel in the Caspian Sea, alleging that the ship was involved in transporting military-related cargo between Iran and Russia to support Russia's war effort in Ukraine. The strike reportedly damaged the vessel and resulted in a sailor's death and another injured, according to Iran. Ukraine presented the operation as part of its campaign to disrupt Russia's supply networks, particularly routes used to transfer weapons and military equipment.

Following the attack, Iran considered a retaliatory strike against Ukraine, reportedly targeting a Ukrainian Black Sea port with a limited ballistic missile strike. However, diplomatic efforts between Iranian and Ukrainian officials reduced tensions. Iran's Foreign Minister Abbas Araghchi said that Ukrainian Foreign Minister Andrii Sybiha described the incident as 'unintentional', though Iran continued to demand compensation for the losses.

Following unconfirmed reports circulated on Telegram channels claiming that Iran planned to launch up to three ballistic missiles against Ukraine, Andriy Kovalenko, head of Ukraine's Center for Countering Disinformation, stated that there was no official information confirming such preparations and warned against spreading unverified claims. However, he emphasised that Iran may possess ballistic missiles that could be used for such attacks.

== List of oil industry facilities in Russia hit by Ukrainian strikes ==
Oil refineries, oil terminals and other oil industrial infrastructure in Russia, struck by Ukrainian attacks since 2025, ranked by refining or transloading capacity. The distance from Ukrainian-controlled territory is indicated in kilometres.

=== Oil refineries ===
Facility	Region	Operator	Capacity by MTPA (Note: Million tonnes per annum (MTPA) refers to the annual crude oil refining capacity of an oil refinery, or the annual handling (transloading/exporting or storage) capacity of an oil terminal, pump, or depot (LPDS).)	Ref	Distance (km) (Note: Estimated distance as the drone flies in kilometres (km) between the targeted facility and Ukrainian-controlled territory; essentially, Ukraine minus the Russian-occupied territories of Ukraine. Although it is possible certain (drone) strikes were launched from elsewhere (such as during Operation Spiderweb), the vast majority of strikes on Russia's oil infrastructure have reportedly originated in Ukrainian-controlled territory.)	Date of strike(s)
Omsk refinery	Omsk Oblast	Gazprom Neft	22.0	(2024)	2500	6 July 2026, 8 October 2026
Kirishi refinery (Kinef)	Leningrad Oblast	Surgutneftegas	17.5	(2024 (Note: Design capacity: 20.0–21.0. Reported result 2024: 17.5 ("6.6% of the total volume of oil refining in the Russian Federation").))	810	March 2024, 14 September 2025, 4 October 2025, 8 March 2026, 26 March 2026, 5 May 2026, 9 July 2026
Ryazan refinery	Ryazan Oblast	Rosneft	13.1	(2024)	480	24 January 2025, 20 February 2025, 2 August 2026, 5 September 2025, 23 October 2025, 15 November 2025, 24 February 2026, 15 May 2026, 29 July 2026
Kstovo refinery	Nizhny Novgorod Oblast	Lukoil (NORSI)	15.0		800	5 April 2026, 20 May 2026, 24 June 2026, 2 July 2026, 26 August 2026
Yaroslavl refinery (YANOS)	Yaroslavl Oblast	Slavneft	14.9	(2024)	700	1 October 2025, (Note: The governor of Yaroslavl Oblast Mikhail Yevrayev claimed that this fire was man-made and not the result of drone attacks.) 12 December 2025, 24 June 2026, 6 July 2026
Volgograd refinery	Volgograd Oblast	Lukoil	13.7	(2024) -40% (2026)	500	11 February 2026, 1 June 2026
Novoshakhtinsk refinery	Rostov Oblast	Yug Rusi	13		200	25 September 2026
Perm refinery	Perm Krai	Lukoil	12.6	(2024)	1485	29 April 2026, 7 May 2026, 29 July 2026, 25 September 2026 See also: 2026 Perm refinery attack
Moscow refinery	Moscow	Gazprom Neft	Offline	(Note: Design capacity: 14. 2024: 11.6. After the June 2026 strikes, the refinery was completely shut down, and industry sources expected the Moscow Refinery to remain offline for at least 6 months pending repairs, before production could be resumed.)	475	17 May 2026, 12 June 2026, 18 June 202620 September 2026
Tuapse refinery Tuapse oil terminal	Krasnodar Krai	Rosneft	12.0		500 (Note: The January 2024 attack was one of Ukraine's first long-range drone strikes. Militarnyi commented: "It is unlikely that the group of drones flew through the occupied Crimea, which is saturated with air defense systems, or across the front line in the Zaporizhzhia region. However, if the route was across the Black Sea, the drones would have flown more than 800 kilometers. It is known that Ukraine has several drones capable of covering distances of 1000 kilometers or more.")	24–25 January 2024, 17 May 2024, 22 July 2024, 14 March 2025, 6 October 2025, 2 November 2025, 16 April 2026, 20 April 2026, 28 April 2026, 1 May 2026, 26–27 May 2026 See also: 2026 Tuapse oil terminal attack
Syzran refinery	Samara Oblast	Rosneft	9		800	18 April 2026, 21 May 2026, 12 July 2026
TANECO	Tatarstan	Tatneft	17.0	(2024)	1150	12 June 2026, 8 July 2026, 7–8 July 2026
TAIF-NIK	Tatarstan	Sibur-RT	8.5		1150	7–8 July 2026
Antipinsky refinery	Tyumen Oblast	RI-Invest	6.0~9.0		2000+	20 June 2026, 25 July 2026
Novokuibyshevsk refinery	Samara Oblast	Rosneft	5.74	(2024)	900	20 September 2025, 19 October 2025, 2 June 2026
Ufimsky refinery	Bashkortostan	Bashneft	3.8	(2024)	1400	3 March 2025, 11 October 2025, 25 June 2025, 1 July 2026.
Saratov oil refinery	Saratov Oblast	Rosneft	5.8	(2024)	700	21 November 2025, 30 May 2026, 8 July 2026
Gazprom Neftekhim Salavat	Bashkortostan	Gazprom	6.5~7.2	(Note: Reported estimates include: 10.0 (design capacity), 6.8 (late 2022), 6.5 (2023), 7.2 (2024); "2.7% of the total refining volume in the Russian Federation.".)	1300	9 May 2024, 18 September 2025, 24 September 2025, 13 July 2026, 8 October 2026
Ilsky refinery	Krasnodar Krai	INPZ	6.6	(Note: The design capacity of Ilsky refinery is 6.6 million tonnes of crude oil annually, but it is unknown what its current real output is as of July 2026, after it had been struck at least 17 times within 3 years and 2 months.)	500	At least 16 times between May 2023 and 2 June 2026, 10 July 2026
Afipsky refinery	Krasnodar Krai	SAFMAR	6.25	(Note: The Afipsky refinery and Krasnodar refinery have been merged as the same legal entity owned by SAFMAR. Their combined capacity was 7.2 million tonnes in 2024, and in January–June 2025 3 million tonnes.)	200	10 February 2025, 7 August 2025, 29 November 2025, 14 March 2026, 11 June 2026, 14 July 2026
Kuibyshev refinery	Samara Oblast	Rosneft	4.7	(2024)	850	9–10 June 2026
Slavyansk Refinery	Krasnodar Krai	Slavyansk ECO	5.2		350	17 December 2025, 24 June 2026, 28 June 2026
Novo-Ufimsky refinery	Bashkortostan	Bashneft – Novoil	3.8	(2024)	1400	1–2 April 2026
Krasnodar refinery	Krasnodar Krai	SAFMAR	3.0		375	30 August 2025
Ukhta refinery	Komi Republic	Lukoil	3.0	(2025)	1720	12 February 2026
NPS Samara, Prosvet	Samara Oblast				950	21 April 2026, 2 October 2026, 7 October 2026

=== Oil terminals and other facilities ===
Facility	Region	Operator	MTPA	Ref	Distance (km)	Date of strike(s)
Sheskharis oil terminal Grushova Balka oil depot	Port of Novorossiysk, Krasnodar Krai	Transneft	19.8	(2025) (Note: In July 2026, The Moscow Times stated: "According to sources, total exports of petroleum products via the Novorossiysk terminals in 2025 amounted to 19.8 million tonnes." As it had a separate entry for the Caspian Pipeline Consortium (CPC) terminal, "the Novorossiysk terminals" probably refers to the Sheskharis oil terminal and Novorossiysk Fuel Oil Terminal (NOFT) combined, but excluding the CPC terminal in Yuzhnaya Ozereyevka.)	340	Sheskharis: 17 May 2024, 2 March 2026, 6 April 2026, (Note: While the Russian Ministry of Defence issued a statement on 6 April 2026 saying that the Ukrainian strikes had hit the CPC marine terminal (in Yuzhnaya Ozereyevka), it provided no visual evidence of the strikes. On the other hand, the General Staff of the Armed Forces of Ukraine claimed that it had attacked the Sheskharis oil terminal, and most media pointed to video footage of a burning oil terminal which the Astra Telegram channel had geolocated to the Sheskharis oil terminal, filmed from the other shore of the Tsemes Bay, as indicated by the Malaya Zemlia memorial that is visible in the video between the camera and the fire across the bay.) 23 May 2026; Grushovaya: 23 May 2026, 8 June 2026
Novorossiysk Fuel Oil Terminal (NOFT)	Port of Novorossiysk, Krasnodar Krai	NCSP & Gunvor	5.0	17 May 2024	340	
Yuzhnaya Ozereyevka CPC marine terminal	Port of Novorossiysk, Krasnodar Krai	Caspian Pipeline Consortium	48.0	(Note: On 6 April 2026, The Moscow Times reported the oil transloading capacity of the CPC marine terminal at Yuzhnaya Ozereyevka as "roughly 1 million barrels per day", "between 3.5 million and 4.5 million tons of crude per month", "up to 20% of Russia’s seaborne oil exports", and "around 1% of the world's oil supplies, as well as around 80% of Kazakhstan's exports".)	340	29 November 2025
Port of Primorsk	Leningrad Oblast	Transneft	60.0		1087	12 September 2025, 22–23 and 25 March 2026, 5 April 2026, 3 May 2026
Ust-Luga Multimodal Complex: Ust-Luga Oil JSC terminal; Nevskaya OPC terminal; Novatek terminal	Leningrad Oblast	Ust-Luga Oil JSC; Nevskaya: Gazprombank & Transneft-Baltika; Novatek	32.9	(2025) (Note: "According to source-based data, the port [of Ust-Luga] exported 32.9 million metric tonnes of oil products last year [2025] and typically handles about 700,000 barrels of crude oil per day."); 9.0 (Note: "The [Novatek] Ust-Luga complex has three processing units with a capacity of 3 million metric tons a year each and refines stable gas condensate into light and heavy naphtha, jet fuel, ship fuel component (fuel oil) and gasoil.")	875	21 January 2024, 24 August 2025 (Novatek), 22, 25, 27, 29, 31 March 2026, 6 July 2026
Petersburg Oil Terminal	Leningrad Oblast	Petersburg Oil Terminal JSC (Note: Since April 2025, 55% of shares have been seized by the Russian state from Cyprus-based offshore holding companies owned by children of the deceased co-founder Dmitry Skigin. The remaining 45% is owned by Elena Vasilieva, widow of co-owner Sergey Vasiliev. Fuel is supplied by Rosneft North-West LLC, which acquired the Petersburg Fuel Company (PTK) in 2019, liquidating it in 2021.)	12.5		1100	18 January 2024, 3 June 2026, 4 July 2026
Tikhoretsk oil pumping station	Krasnodar Krai	Transneft	45		300	12 March 2026
Port of Taman	Krasnodar Krai	OTEKO	20.0 (LPG)		247	13 June 2024, 13 May 2026, 13 June 2026
Vysotsk oil terminal	Leningrad Oblast	Lukoil	9.0	(2025)		18 April 2026, 6 July 2026
Rostov-on-Don Yug Rusi terminal	Rostov Oblast	Yug Rusi group	3.5		200	10 October 2026
Port Kavkaz	Krasnodar Krai	Rosmorport	2.5		300	20–21 June 2026
Cherkassy LPDS	Bashkortostan	Transneft-Ural	2.0		1500	8 July 2026
Taganrog oil terminal	Rostov Oblast	Kurgannefteprodukt	1.2		170	10 July 2026
Tvernefteprodukt oil depot	Tver Oblast	Surgutneftegas	(6,400 m^{3})		520	9 July 2026
Yugnefteprodukt oil depot	Stavropol Krai	Lukoil	0.15 (5,600 m^{3})		500	9 July 2026, 13 July 2026, 18 July 2026
Noginsk oil depot	Moscow Oblast					18 July 2026

== Impact ==
On 4 July 2026, the General Staff of the Armed Forces of Ukraine estimated 42.74% of Russia's oil refining capacity had been disabled at that time, while the International Energy Agency (IEA) said "more than 20%" of capacity has been knocked offline. Finnish President Alexander Stubb stated in early July 2026 that Russia's capacity to produce and export oil had been reduced by 40% due to the Ukrainian mid- and long-range drone strikes. The Financial Times reported that Russia produced 4.1 million barrels of oil per day in June 2026 (28% below the 5-year average, and 35% below design capacity); the fuel shortage had so far affected 50 million people (35% of the Russian Federation's population); and by 9 July the majority of regions of Russia had local authorities or retailers imposing fuel sales restrictions.

Exiled Russian energy expert Mikhail Krutikhin concluded in mid-July 2026: "I think some of the oil capacity of Russia has been lost forever, because of the closure of the [oil] wells right now. Russia is not going to recover, even five years after the war." Around the same time, Radio Svoboda reported based on recent satellite imagery that Russia was withdrawing most of its remaining S-300 and S-400 air defence systems from the Arctic Far North (especially Novaya Zemlya and Severodvinsk in Arkhangelsk Oblast) in order to protect its oil refineries (such as the Saratov refinery, where air defence systems appeared to have been moved between May 2023 and August 2025) and Moscow to the southwest from Ukrainian drone strikes. The remaining stockpile of these types of air defence missiles was reportedly also diminishing due to being outproduced by Ukrainian drone manufacturing, as well as direct strikes on air defence launchers, although the remaining volume was unknown, and Ukrainian officials cautioned that Russia had some other systems left. More generally, OSINT analysts concluded that c. 60% of Russia's air defence systems had been moved from the locations they were stationed in before Russia's large-scale invasion of Ukraine in 2022.

According to Russian Forbes, 54% of all oil refineries had been damaged by August 2026. In July 2026, Russia's daily petrol output declined to 75,000~80,000 tonnes, even though domestic summer demand was 115,000~120,000 tonnes a day, meaning Russia had a daily oil refining capacity deficit of c. 35%.
