= 2026 Perm refinery attack =

Ukrainian deep strike on oil refinery in Perm, Russia

- Part of Deep strike campaign, Russo-Ukrainian War
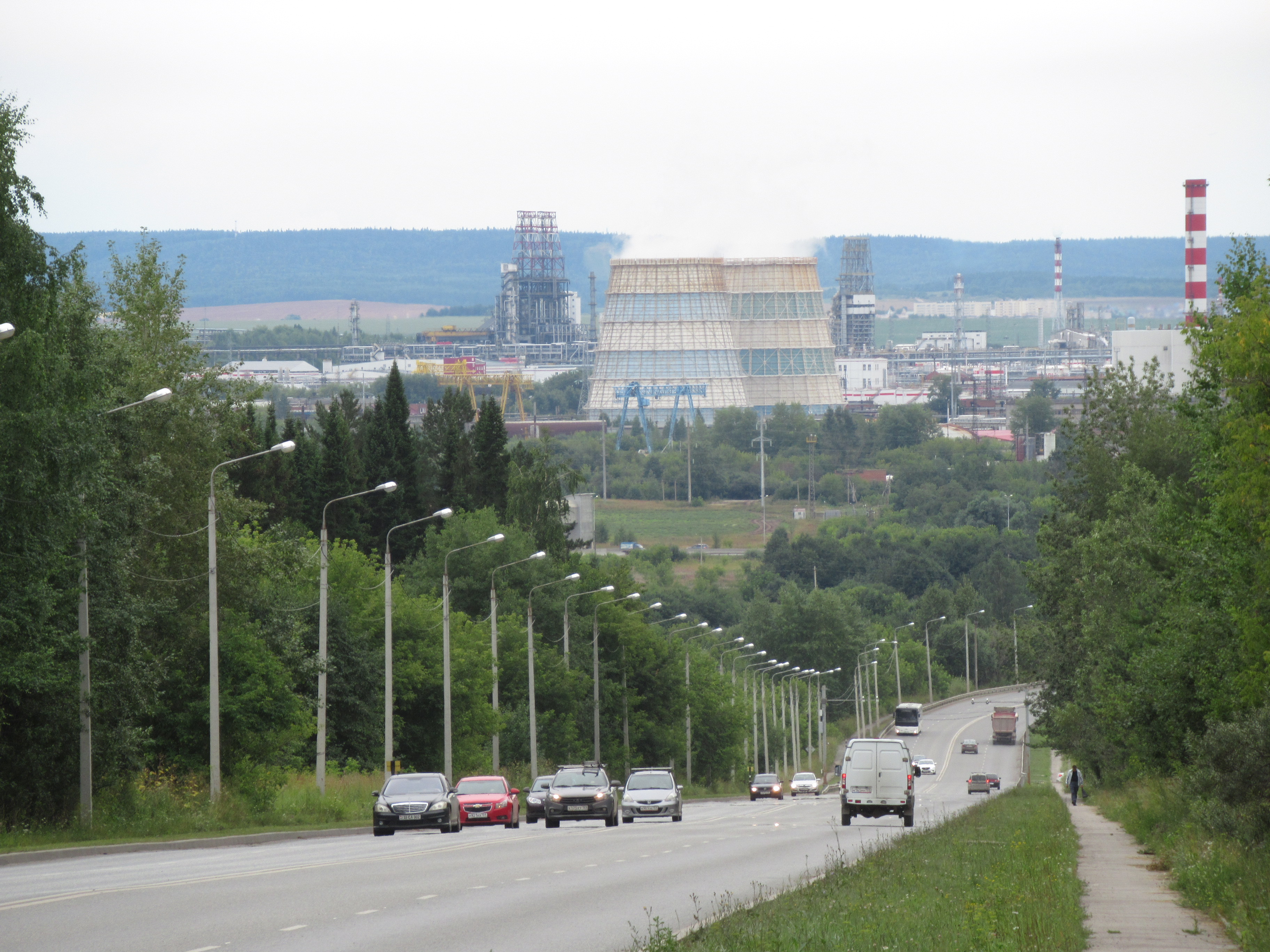
- Perm oil refinery in 2020
- Location: Perm, Perm Krai, Russia
- Target: Perm refinery, linear production and dispatch station (Transneft, Lukoil)
- Date: 29 April 2026
- Executed by: Unmanned Systems Forces of Ukraine

On 29 April 2026, Ukrainian drones struck key oil infrastructure, including the Perm refinery and pipeline facilities, triggering large-scale fires and disrupting operations as part of the 2026 Deep strike campaign.

== Events ==
The strikes targeted the Perm refinery operated by Lukoil, as well as the nearby production and dispatch station, part of the Transneft pipeline network. According to reports, key oil processing units were damaged and multiple storage tanks caught fire, causing large blazes lasting for days. This resulted in air pollution and disruption to oil transport operations. The incident is part of a series of Ukrainian attacks in Russia during the Russo-Ukrainian War, aimed at preventing Russia from funding its war through oil exports.

Following the strikes, multiple fuel storage tanks ignited, and fires spread across several industrial sites, burning for days and causing extensive damage to production capacity.

A chemical emergency alert was issued for some parts of Perm, but city authorities later claimed the alert was merely a test.

The attacks also disrupted regional oil transportation infrastructure, temporarily affecting pipeline operations and refinery output.

The incident was noted as one of the deepest strikes of the war, occurring more than 1,500 km from the Ukrainian border.

== See also ==
- 2026 Tuapse oil terminal attack
- 2025 Russian fuel crisis
- Environmental impact of the Russian invasion of Ukraine
- Attacks in Russia during the Russo-Ukrainian war (2022–present)
- Deep strike campaign
