= Port of Novorossiysk =

Largest port in Krasnodar Krai, from Russia

Port of Novorossiysk Новороссийский морской порт
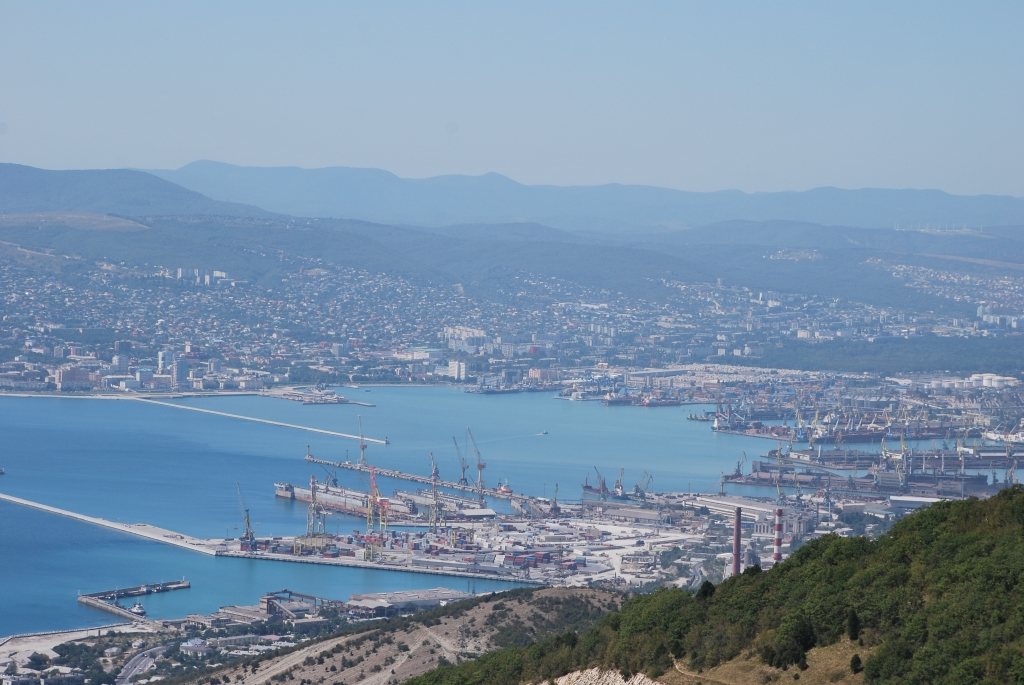
- Port area from above, 2010
- Interactive map of Port of Novorossiysk; Новороссийский морской порт

Location
- Location: Russia, Krasnodar Krai, Black Sea coast, Tsemes (Novorossiysk) Bay
- Coordinates: 44°44′N 37°47′E
- UN/LOCODE: RUNVS

Details
- Operated by: FSBI ‘Administration of the Black Sea Ports’
- Size of harbour: 344 ha (2017)
- Land area: 278.12 ha (2017)
- No. of berths: 89 of 15626.91 m (2017)
- Harbourmaster: Tuzikevick E. V.

Statistics
- Annual cargo tonnage: 112.5 mln tons (2013)
- Capacity: 208793 thousand tons (2017)
- Radars: 4 aircraft interception radars
- Nearest airport: Gelendzhik, Vityazevo Anapa
- Website http://bsamp.ru/info-city-novorossiysk

Novorossiysk Sea Port (Russian: Новороссийский морской порт, NSP) is one of the largest ports in the Black Sea basin and the largest in Krasnodar Krai. At 8.3 km, the NSP berthing line is the longest among all the ports of Russia. The port is located on the Northeast coast of the Black Sea, in the Tsemes Bay (also called Novorossiysk Bay). The bay is ice-free and open for navigation all year round. However, in winter the navigation occasionally stops due to the hazardous northeastern bora wind. The Tsemes Bay allows deep-draft vessels up to 19 m, and the inner harbour up to 12.5 m. The liquid bulk terminals depth range from 8.4 to 15.6 m, suitable for tankers with a deadweight of up to 250,000 tons, like Suezmax-class vessels.

== Description ==
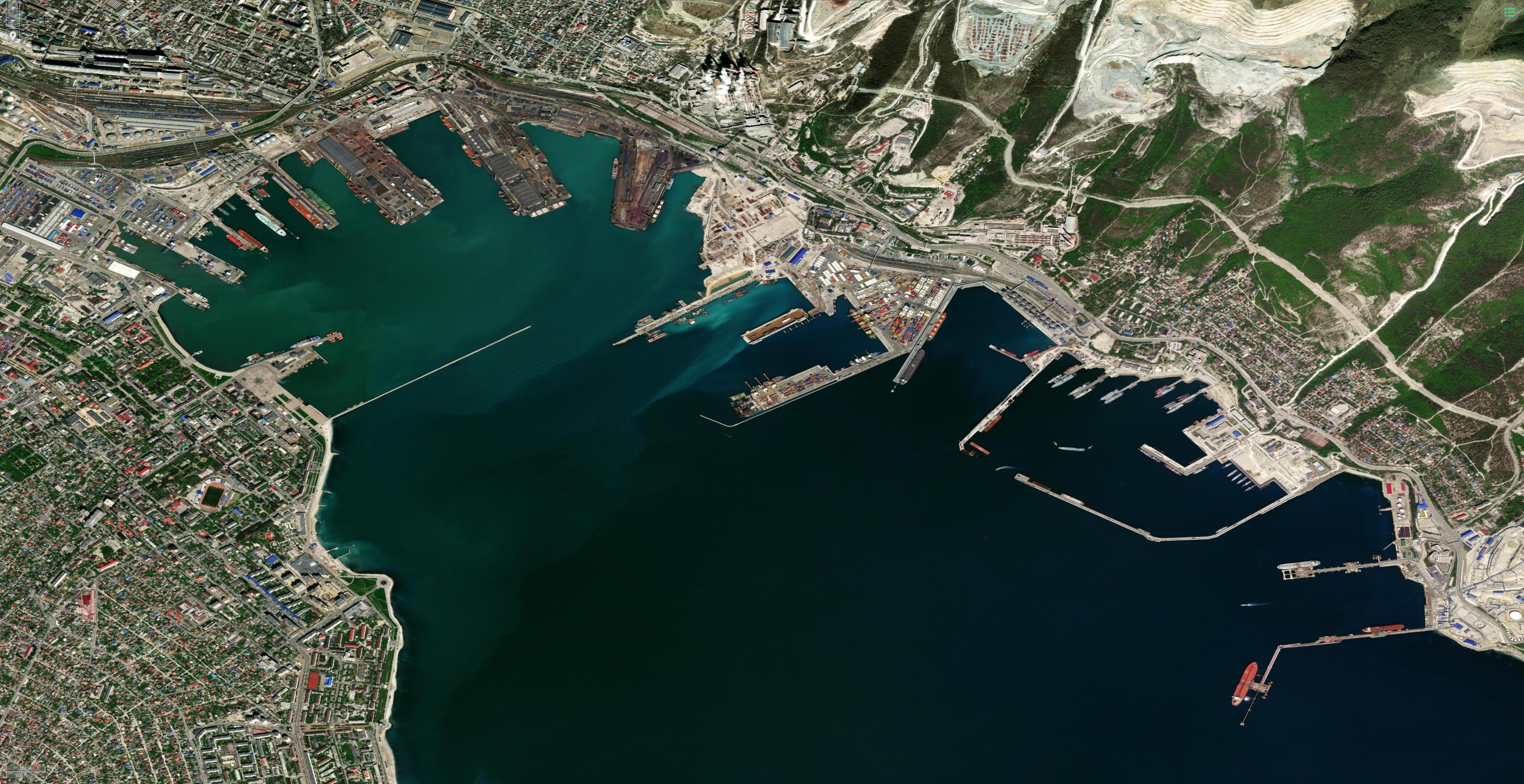
Satellite imagery of Port of Novorossiysk

The Port of Novorossiysk is located at the crossroads of major international transport corridors between Russia and the Mediterranean Sea, the Near East, Africa, Southern Asia, Southeastern Asia, North and South America. NSP is the final destination for several international highways, such as the Trans-Siberian Railway, TRACECA, North-South International Transport Corridor, and Pan-European International Transport Corridor No. 9.

In the mid-2010s, NSP was the largest port in Russia and the Black Sea basin and the third largest in Europe. In 2011 it accounted for 21% of total cargo turnover in the country. By 2017 the port had 89 berths with a total length of 15,627 m, its annual capacity for the same year was estimated at 208,793 thousand tons. Bulk liquid cargo (oil and oil products) constituted a major part of the yearly turnover (160,688 thousand tons), followed by 37,509 thousand tons of dry cargo and 883,000 TEU containers. The Port of Novorossiysk mainly handles grain, coal, mineral fertilizers, timber, oil and oil products, containerized, food, and general cargo. In 2014 the total turnover amounted to 121.59 million tons, including 720,000 TEU, the largest value for the Black Sea basin and the second-highest in Russia. Total berth length in NSP equals 8.3 km. The territory is separated into several areas: three cargo terminals (East, West, and Central), a passenger area and the Sheskharis oil harbour.

== History ==
=== Russian Empire ===
==== Novorossiysk and the Port in the middle of the 19th century ====
The Adrianople Treaty of 1829 concluded the Russo-Turkish War of 1828–29 between Russia and Ottoman Empire, transferring the Sujuk Bay and the rest of the Black Sea coast under Russian domain. To defend these newly acquired territories the government fortified the coastline with numerous forts and strongholds. Among them was the fortress in Sujuk, founded on 12 September 1838. On 14 January 1839, it received the name Novorossiysk (a derivative of recently acquired territories) by a special order of state Minister of War. Later, Nicholas I of Russia issued a decree, assigning the name ‘Novorossiyskaya’, or ‘Tsemesskaya’, to the bay (after its tributary). Another royal decree (signed on 30 June 1845) initiated the construction of a new trade port. In 1846, the Novorossiysk fortress became a town.

In 1846, the port handled 109 foreign (mainly Turkish) vessels with various cargo — leather, cotton threads, tobacco, crockery, fruit, vegetables, and sugar. Russian vessels delivered construction supplies, salt, and wine. Rye, wheat, butter, salo, honey, and highland merchandise were exported. First warehouses were built from local worked stone. Loading/unloading were performed on a roadstead — launches and feluccas were used for on-water freight, while horse-drawn carriages served for inland transportation. At that time, Novorossiysk was separated from Krasnodar Krai and other rich provinces, thus it was excluded from major trade on the Russian market. During the Crimean War the town was destroyed.

==== Late 19th to early 20th centuries ====
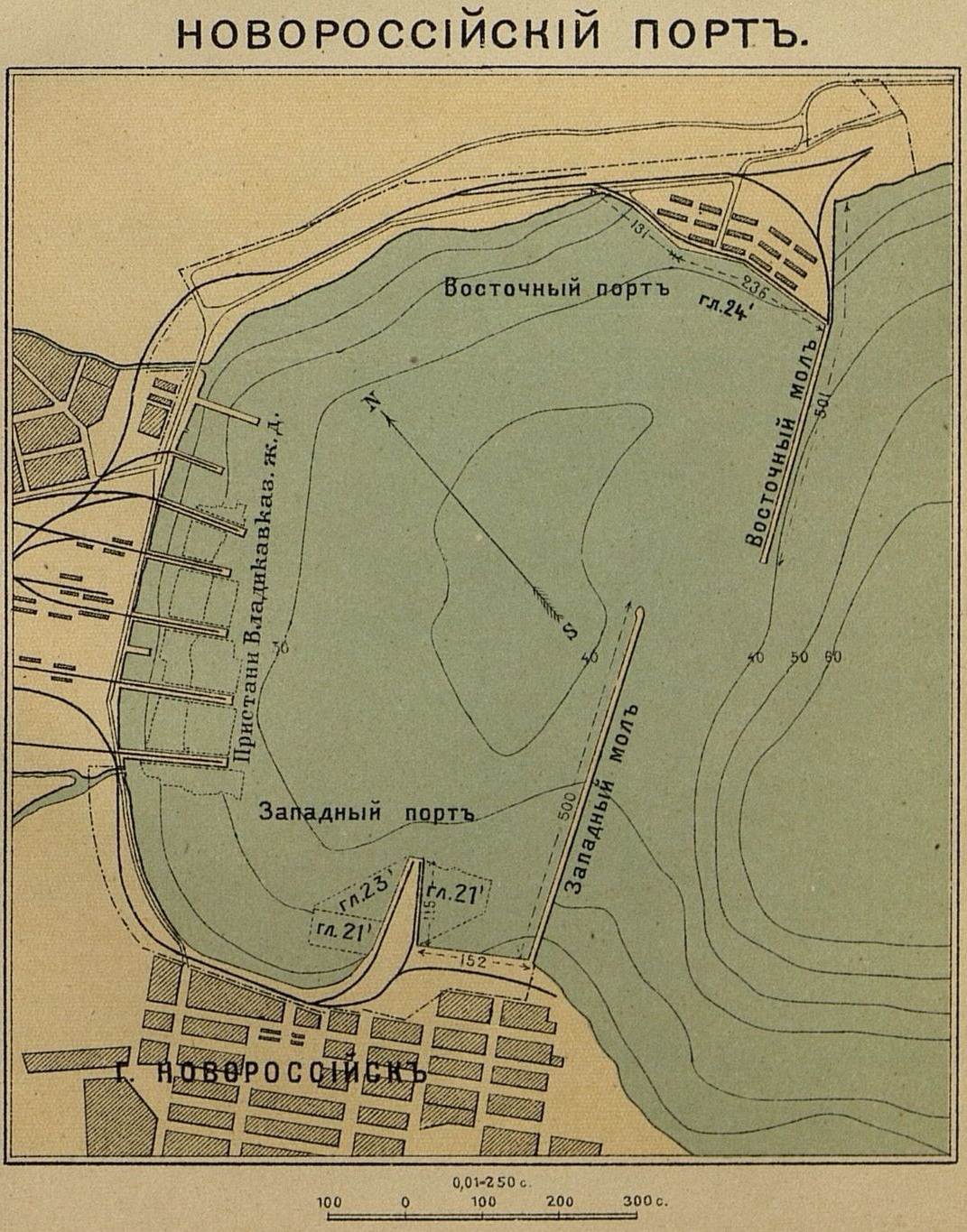
Map of the Port of Novorossiysk, before 1915.

In 1872, Alexander II issued a royal decree, appointing a committee to research and locate proper sites for new sea ports at the Black Sea coast. In 1874, the committee reported that because of the strong bora winds the Tsemes Bay could serve as the main port, thus it was advised to be used for the construction of a cabotage port. Several alternative projects were offered but never implemented. The proximity of Vladikavkaz Railway played a decisive role in site choice, it was planned to connect the bay with the inland transport chains via future Tikhoretsk — Novorossiysk conjunction. The Imperial Ministry of Railways offered several projects of the future port to the State Council. The approved project's construction required 3.5 mln roubles, while the planned cargo turnover was estimated at 30 mln poods.

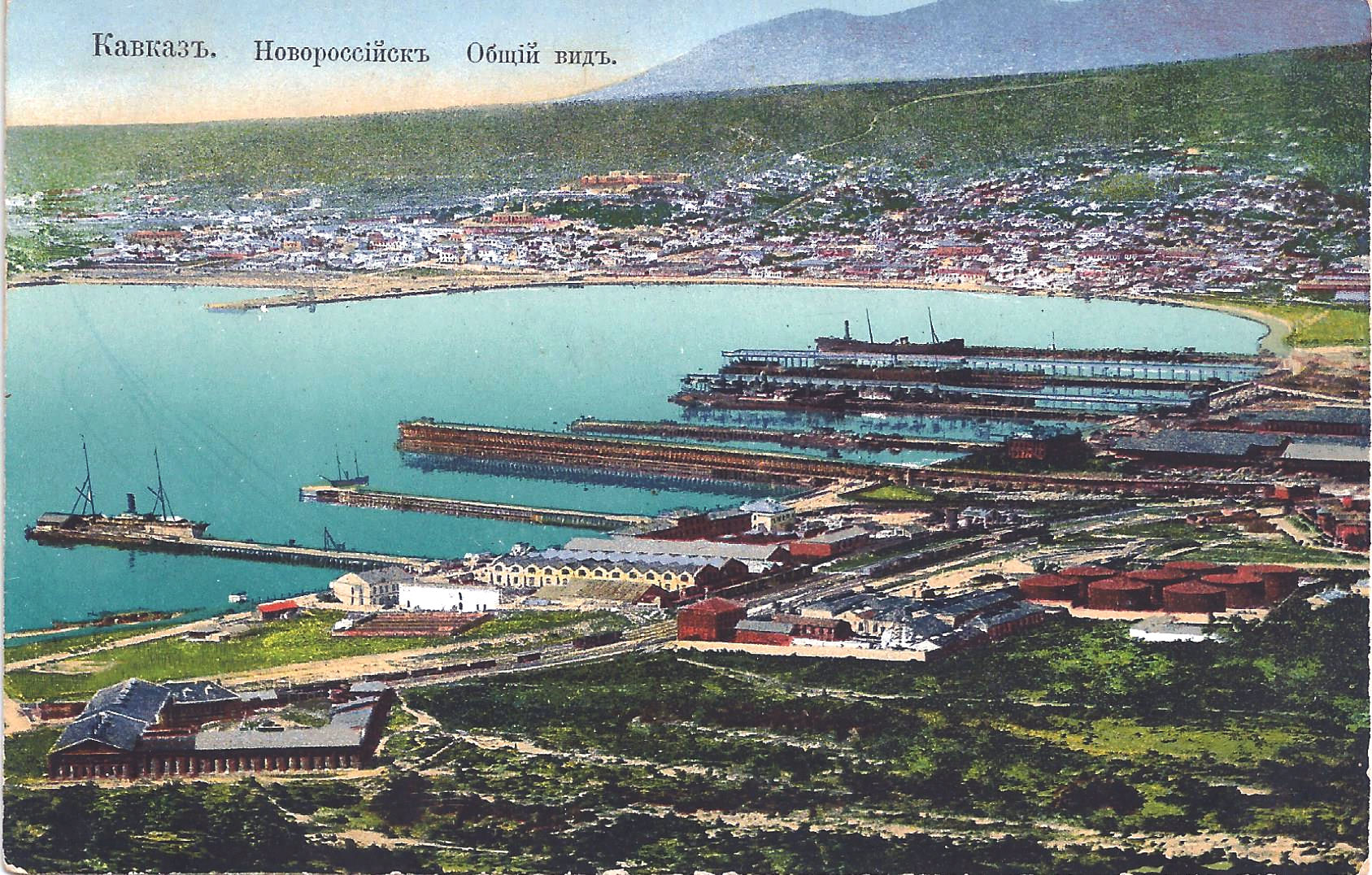
Novorossiysk and the port, postcard, 1900–1904.

The construction site located at the North-West part of the Tsemes Bay, less imposed to strong winds. The project included building miscellaneous facilities — a breakwater with a light-house at the South-West side, wharfs, utility railroads, bridges, paved roads, 2 track cranes, lighting and water supply. The infrastructure for personnel included a canteen, a kitchen, hospitals, workshops, and barracks. In 1866 the plan, overall budget and working conditions were approved by the Special Committee on Commercial Ports. On 8 August 1888, the first vessel sailed off to the new port — a French ‘Mingreli’, loaded with grain. A short time before the railroad conjunction between the port and Novorossiysk had been put into operation. By 1895 new berths (East, West and several state-owned) were opened, one of them was soon taken on lease by ‘Chernomorsky Cement’ company. The enterprise entered the cement market with raw materials from recently discovered Novorossiysk marl pits. In general, private capital played a major part in Novorossiysk Port development. For instance, Vladikavkaz Railway Society investments reached 15 mln roubles, twice more than the total value of all Novorossiysk industrial objects.

==== USSR ====
In the Russian Civil War, NSP was severely damaged in fights between the Red and the Volunteer Army. Later, under Bolshevik control the port was nationalized. In 1921—1922 it made a significant impact on food supplies to the victims of severe famine in Volga Region. That contribution was honoured with an Order of the Red Banner of Labour. Later, NSP was awarded the same order for raising the wreck of ‘Elbrus’ oil-carrier, sank in the years of World War I. The infrastructure and total cargo turnover recovered gradually. While in 1920 the turnover was only 16 mln thousand tons, by 1923 it grew to 1.2 mln. By 1926 all the berths were reconstructed and put into operation, including a newly built coal pier (later named ‘Importniy’). In 1926-30 the Port of Novorossiysk doubled the pre-war grain shipment amount, then during the Second Five-year Plan it doubled the total turnover. Some wooden berths were replaced with reinforced concrete, a new harbor basin was constructed for cabotage fleet, an embankment and an ice-box were added.

By 1940, NSP had become one of the leading ports in South USSR. It comprised 4 loading areas, import and cement docks, a cabotage area and the West Embankment (106.5 ha). There were 41 operating berths with a total length of 4.69 km, the staff rose to 2076 port workers (including 509 lumpers). In 1940, the NSP handled 416 vessels and processed 1554 thousand tons of cargo. Upon the outbreak of World War II the port served for evacuation, shipped ammunition and weapons to the battle front line. The bravery and courage of the port workers were acknowledged and honoured with state medals. By 1943 only one berth of all NSP facilities remained intact. The State Defense Committee ordered the reconstruction to begin, as soon as 1 October 1944, NSP was officially reopened. However, the complete reconstruction was finished only in 1950. By the middle of the 1960s, new facilities were added — ‘Shirokiy’ dock, ‘Sheskharis’ oil terminal, a passenger harbor station, workshops, and even a Sailors' Palace.

=== Russian invasion of Ukraine ===
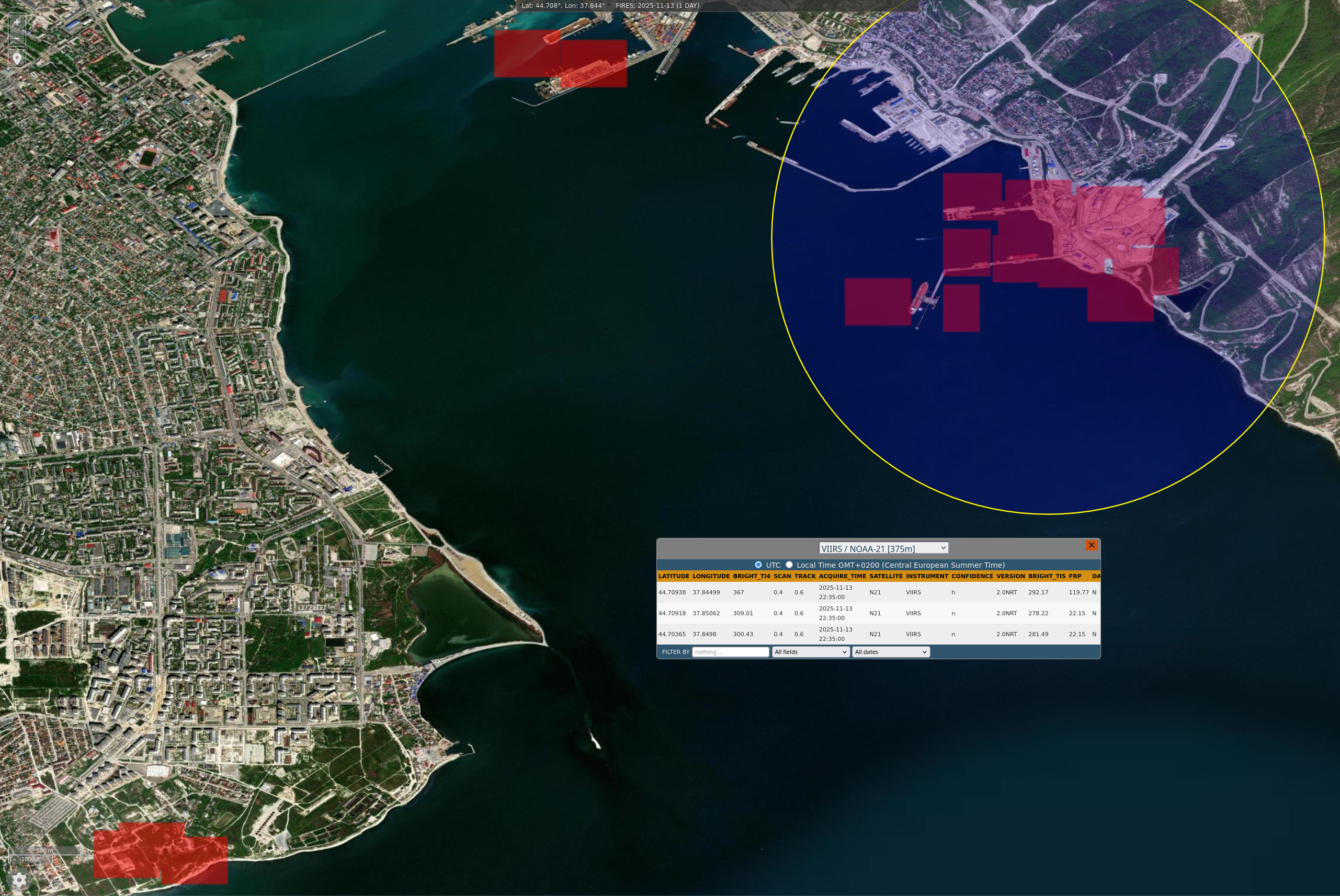
NASA's FIRMS detected fires on 13 November 2025 22:35:00 (UTC) in the Port of Novorossiysk including its oil terminal and at a air defense site

In its defense against the Russian invasion of Ukraine Ukraine has repeatedly attacked the Port of Novorossiysk with drones and missiles. An attack in November 2025 set fire to oil export infrastructure including pumping stations, berthed tankers and pipelines, halting oil exports from the port. Following the attack, the State Department expressed its displeasure with Ukraine, stating that the attack did hurt US business interests.

== Infrastructure ==
=== Vessel traffic management ===
Safe navigation in the waters of NSP is supported by Vessel Traffic Service (VTS) solution by Rosmorport. The local system includes VTS Centre and four remotely controlled radio technical posts (RTP) — ‘Doob’, ‘Penay’, ‘Gelendzhik’, and ‘Youzhnaya Ozereevka’. Doob RTP is installed in the proximity of Doob Lighthouse 95 m above sea level, it serves for detection and observation of approaching vessels and backs up Penay RTP. The latter is located at the front Penay range marker 35 m above sea level, providing direct visual of Novorossiysk bay. Penay RTP backs up Doob RTP performance for distance range. In its turn, Gelendzhik RTP stands at the South-East slope of the Doob mountain 301 m above sea level. It serves for distance range observation of vessel approach and backs up Youzhnaya Ozereevka RTP. Youzhnaya Ozereevka secures observation of the Caspian Pipeline Consortium in operational responsibility area and its approaches.

The mentioned RTPs detect vessels at a range up to 15–20 miles, determine coordinates, velocity, and direction. In case of possible emergency all obtained data is sent to the Central VST operator and other vessels within range. All vessels are obliged to enter and move in NSP water area only under Novorossiysk VTS permission.

== Major facilities ==
=== Novorossiysk Timber Port ===
Before the Russian Revolution no Russian Black Sea ports had specialized timber handling terminals. However, NSP historically processed various timber cargo flows to the Near East. In 1929—31 the very first terminal for timber export was put into operation at the port of Novorossiysk, comprising warehouses, log yards, and special berths. As soon as in 1940—41 the company was shut along with a complete cease of foreign trade via NSP. By 1945 a new timber yard was opened at the Port of Novorossiysk. The state company, managed by Glavsnables (General Directorate for Wood and Timber Supply), handled hardwood timber deliveries from Romania. By 1956 the yard was reorganized into Novorossiysk timber port under the management of USSR Ministry for Paper and Timber Industries.

USSR Ministry of Forest Economy granted 8 mln roubles on expansion and development of the timber harbour. It was targeted on trade with Mediterranean and Middle Eastern countries with an estimated export volume of 250 thousand m^{3} and 100 thousand m^{3} import. In the following years, the terminal capacity grew rapidly. In 1958 the Timber Port of Novorossiysk total turnover reached 415 thousand m^{3}, by 10 years it boosted up to 1700 (including 850 thousand m^{3} of timber cargo).

By 1980 the Timber Port covered 56.8 ha and became an enterprise of federal importance. It was equipped with 30 various cranes (portal, frame, tower, railway, etc.), the timber terminal had 2 separate lines for lumber drying and bundling, grading and sorting machines, and a whole fleet of machinery (52 electric and truck loaders, 33 lumber trucks, 9 transporter trains, etc.). In 1992 NSP went public and was renamed into Novoroslesexport, later privatized. Then it began operating as a diverse harbour, handling various cargo. The first container terminal was launched in 1999. In 2006 Novoroslesexport was acquired by the NMTP Group.

=== Novorossiysk Shipyard ===
According to an order of Sovnarkom, the first major shipyard was launched at the Port of Novorossiysk in the Spring of 1918. All the facilities, previously engaged in berths and equipment maintenance (plus locomotive shed and railway slip at the Eastern slope of the Tsemes Bay), were merged into united port workshops. In the 1920s these workshops were expanded and upgraded to dockage facilities, by August 1941 growing into a shipyard.

Upon the outbreak of the World War II two floating drydocks were transferred from Odesa, NSP workers engaged in military fleet maintenance and arming civilian vessels, while the factory refocused on defense items. The advance of German troops forced the evacuation, part of the NSP equipment was transferred to southern ports, some relocated into tunnels of cement factories. When the main part of the town was captured by enemy troops, some workers joined the partisans, others were evacuated. The NSP factory was destroyed during the fights, the reconstruction started only in September 1943, when the town was liberated. By January 1944 new railway slip was built, in April of the same year the 4000-ton floating drydock was raised and reconstructed. Since then the factory actively engaged in the restoration of NSP and Soviet Navy fleet. The enterprise reached full capacity by 1948.

Further expansion and modernisation of Novorossiysk Shipyard started in the 1950s when the enterprise got new foundry, mechanical, and galvanizing workshops. In 1965 the factory opened a 27000-ton floating drydock. By the 1980s new facilities for heavy cargo vessels extended total shipyard area from 16.6 up to 25 ha. In 1985 Novorossiysk Shipyard launched the largest drydock of 60,000 tons capacity, enabling the facility to serve all civil and military vessels of the Russian fleet. Upon the dissolution of the Soviet Union number of orders on ship repair significantly reduced, therefore the enterprise refocused on processing metal cargo, then switched to lumber and rolling cargo. In 2006 the shipyard joined NMTP Group. By 2013 the facility almost ceased its primary service as vessel repair centre.

=== Oil infrastructure ===
The Nobel brothers and the Rothschilds launched oil transfer at the Port of Novorossiysk. The Nobels managed numerous facilities at NSP, such as oil storages, a 95-meter long pipeline, a discharge jetty for tank cars, pumps, and a berth handling vessels of deadweight up to 1.5 tons. One of the Nobel's riveted tanks was operational and used at NSP up to 1988. The Rothschilds owned Caspian-Black Sea Oil Company, that co-founded Nouvelle Societe du Standard Russe Grozny (in Russia known as Russian Standard) with Royal Dutch Shell. In 1882 Russian Standard opened the first oil refinery plant in Russia, three years later adding a 70-kilometre pipeline from Ilsky production fields. Russian Standard covered an area to the East from the Vladikavkaz Railway and constructed a 150-meter dock for oil and oil-related products.

In 1918, after the nationalisation of oil enterprises, oil export became a valuable source of foreign exchange revenue for the USSR. In the 1920s and 1930s it was consistently high, but during the Second World War all the facilities were destroyed. The possibility of oil freight in Novorossiysk was reconsidered only in the 1950s.

==== Sheskharis terminal ====
At the southeastern end of the Port of Novorossiysk lies the Sheskharis oil terminal, run by the state-controlled oil pipeline company Transneft (not to be confused with the Novorossiysk Fuel Oil Terminal some 2 kilometres northwest, jointly owned by Gunvor the Novorossiysk Commercial Sea Port). The Sheskharis oil terminal is connected via a 3-kilometre pipeline to the oil depot at Grushovaya Balka (Russian: Грушовая Балка) in the mountains in the northeast.

New transshipment terminal construction was initiated in 1960 based on resolutions of the Council of Ministers of USSR (and later RSFSR) as a part of oil industry development program, personally supervised by Nikita Khrushchev. The construction site was set near Sheskharis Cape at the Tsemes Bay coast, ranging from 100 m to 40 m above sea level. Upon completion total amount of tank fields reached 99,000 m^{3}.

The terminal received a breakwater with estimated wave load of 6.5 m and a ballast water discharge pipeline, strengthened with front and rear bank protection. The first vessel to be handled at berth No.4 of Sheskharis oil terminal became ‘Lihoslavl’ tanker en route to Trieste, Italy, processed on 19 October 1964. At the same time a new tank field of 200 thousand m^{3} capacity was launched in the area of Grushovaya Balka and connected to Sheckharis via 3000-meter tunnel through the Markotkh ridge. The slope tilt allowed the flow of oil and oil derivatives move down, passing through quality and quantity control points.

The united complex of the Sheskharis oil terminal and the Grushovaya Balka oil depot became the largest in Europe and the most efficient in USSR. In 1966 and 1976 BW treatment systems were put into operation, in 1978 the complex received a new pipeline for direct oil transportation from the oil depot to vessels. In the same year a deep-water berth was constructed, later an automatic filling system was introduced. By 1966, Sheskharis' annual cargo turnover reached 50 million tons and the range of destinations expanded to 23 countries. In 2002—2003, the total volume of Grushovaya Balka oil depot reached 1.2 million m^{3}. In 2012, Sheckharis and Grushovaya merged into the united enterprise ‘Sheskharis oil terminal’.

By 2012, the Sheskharis oil terminal accounted for more than 30% of Russian oil export. The terminal has 3 docks of 200 meters total length. Berth No.1 is the deepest, it can handle vessels with deadweight up to 250,000 tons and 19-meters draft, it transfers only oil cargo with 10,000 tons per hour capacity. Berth No.2 is 14.5 meters deep, it can take vessels up to 90,000 deadweight and 13.9 m draft, its capacity range from 90 up to 6,000 tons per hour. Berth No.3 accepts ships up to 33,000 DWT, draft alongside is 10.9 m, it processes mainly naphtha residue and diesel (800–900) tons per hour. Berth No.4 serves bunkering vessels up to 3.6 DWT. Berths No.5 and No.8 transfer oil derivatives and accept tankers up to 12,000 tons DWT. Berths No.6 and No.7 are able to take tankers up to 65,000 tons DWT, draft alongside is 13 m. Sheskharis oil terminal can simultaneously process 7 tankers.

In November 2025, in the Ukraine-Russian War, Ukraine damaged the terminal, causing Russia to suspend oil exports from Novorossyisk.

=== Grain handling facilities ===
Railroad and NSP facilitated grain export, opening transportation from Don, Volga region and Stavropol. To strengthen the monopoly in grain export Vladikavkaz Railway Company established a new enterprise — Novorossiysk Commercial Agency, purposed to manage storage, vessels loading/unloading. More than 20 wooden, stone and iron silos were constructed for grain storage. At that time all handling processes like loading and drying were performed manually, requiring almost 1000 workers. To reduce workforce the agency decided to build a grain elevator.

The project was designed by Stanisław Kierbedź and led by an engineer A. N. Shesnesevich. The elevator comprised two side silos, each including 364 grain bins for 47,000 tons of grain, and 14-stores high towers. In addition, the first in the world three-phase power plant was constructed nearby. The works started in 1891 and were finished in 1893, a year later the elevator was put into operation. Electrification and automatization allowed to reduce staff down to 60 operators. The expenses reached 2,418,517 roubles. The elevator was the most modern of its time and best equipped in the world, in capacity it yielded only to the one in Chicago. It survived all wars of the 20th century and was closed only in 1972. The reconstruction started in 2017–18, the edifice is planned to be turned into a modern exhibition complex.

== Port management ==
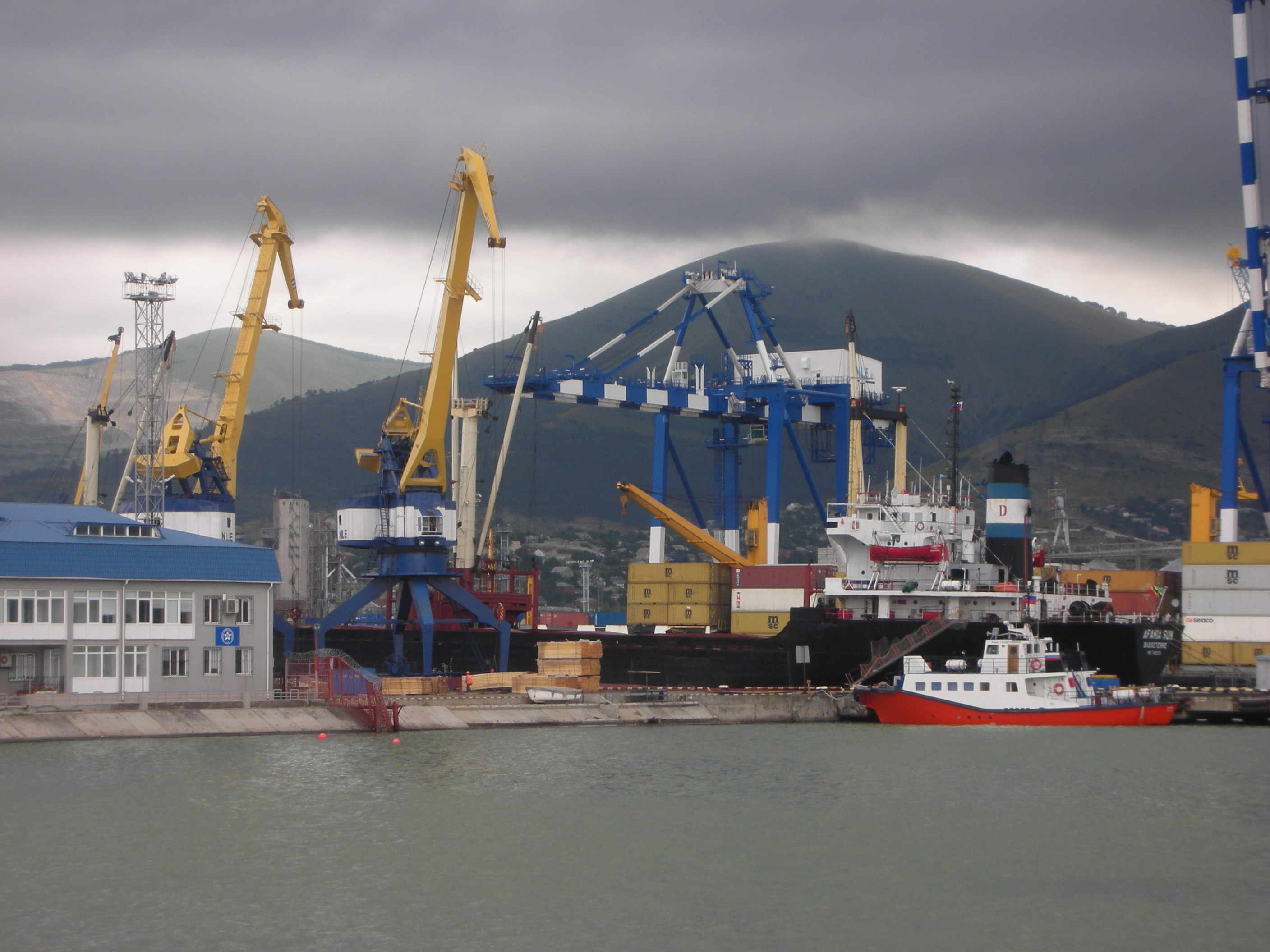
At the Port of Novorossiysk

The port is managed by FGBI ‘Administration of Black Sea Seaports’ (ABS), that was established by an order of the Russian Ministry for Transport following Federal Act No. 261. The Administration provides management, equipment and funding support to captains of Russian seaports (Sochi, Tuapse, Gelendzhik, Novorossiysk, Anapa, Taman, Kerch, Feodosia, Yalta, Sevastopol, and Yevpatoriya). As a part of ABS, NSP Port Authorities ensure the respect of legal and regulatory provisions of the commercial maritime law.

== Port operators ==
According to the Russian Maritime Register of Shipping (RMRS), there are 16 operators in NSP — Caspian Pipeline Consortium, NUTEP, KSK, Novorossiysk Shipyard, FAMART Rescue Service, Novoroslesexport, Novorossiyskiy Grain Terminal, Novorossiysk Grain Plant, Novorossiysk Fuel Oil Terminal (including InmorTerminal LLC), ‘Komandor’, ‘Maritime Engineering’, NNK, IPP, Novorossiysk Industrial Company, ‘April’, SP Artak Vasilyan, and FSUE Rosmorport.

=== DeloPorts ===
Delo business group was established in 1993 by Sergey Shishkarev, son of the port operational manager, it became the first private major stevedore company in NSP. In 2015 DeloGroup structured its Novorossiysk assets into united holding DeloPorts, that comprised NUTEP container terminal, KSK grain terminal and Delo service operator (engaged in bunkering, towing and other services at DeloPorts berths). Previously Delo Group also owned NCC oil terminal, but in 2013 it was sold to Gazprom Marine Bunker. By the first quarter of 2018 NUTEP ranked the second in the Black Sea basin based on total volume of handled cargo. In the meantime, KSK was the third largest grain processing terminal in the same region.

=== NMTP Group ===
Novorossiysk Commercial Sea Port (NMTP) was established based on the privatisation of NSP in the early and mid-1990s. Major blocks of shares went to Uralsib, Sergey Shishkarev's Delo Group and Russian General Bank (co-owned by Aleksandr Skorobogatko and Alexander Ponomarenko), a part of NMTP shares remained state property. From 1998 Skorobogatko and Ponomarenko gradually increased their shares in NMTP and other stevedore assets of NSP. In 2006 they bought out shares of Delo Group and Uralsib, consolidating more that 70% of NMTP. In alliance with PJSC ‘Fleet of Novorossiysk Commercial Sea Port’ (towing and bunkering operator), IPP (oil and liquid fertilizers operator), Novoroslesexport (timber and container cargo), Novorossiysk Shipyard (vessel repair services and metal cargo shipment), and Novorossiysk grain terminal (grain cargo), NMTP merged into united holding and became the largest NSP operator.

In November 2007 the holding issued public shares on the London Stock Exchange. In 2008 a conflict with Transneft over the Sheskharis oil terminal helped Skorobogatko and Ponomarenko engage Arkady Rotenberg into NMTP capitals. In 2011 Skorobogatko, Ponomarenko and Rotenberg sold out the blocking share of NMTP stocks to Transneft and Summa Group owner Ziyavudin Magomedov. In 2013 Summa Group and Transneft disputed and publicly negotiated on a possible split of NMTP. Following the agreement, inland terminals stayed under Summa Group's management, while Transneft got oil terminals. In the Spring of 2018 Ziyavudin Magomedov and his elder brother (former member of the Russian Federation Council) Magomed were arrested on charges of building a criminal organization and fraud. In October 2018 Summa sold out its NMTP shares to Transneft, increasing its stake up to 60.62%. In February 2019 NMTP sold 100% shares of Novorossiysk Grain Terminal to VTB Bank.

=== Demetra holding ===
After purchasing the Novorossiysk Grain Terminal, VTB began to consolidate its grain assets in Demetra Holding, which is currently the parent company for the Novorossiysk Grain Terminal. In April 2020, VTB engaged to Demetra two minority investors, selling a 25% stake in Demetra Holding to Agronova company and 24.99% stake to the Marathon group. After it, VTB retained control of this company. VTB held a 45% stake in Demtra Holding until 6 July 2023 when Andrei Kostin announced that VTB was selling its stake. In July 2023, the state of Oman owned company Southern Sea Investment LLC gained control of a stake in Demetra Holding. Until August 2023, Alexander Vinokurov held a stake in Demetra Holding through SPN which is in his Russian company Marathon Group.

=== CPC ===
Caspian Pipeline Consortium (CPC) accounts for a considerable part of cargo turnover at NSP. CPC operates CTC-R terminal in Yuzhnaya Ozereevka, that is a final destination of pipeline from Tengiz oil field in Western Kazakhstan to Novorossiysk. Here oil is loaded into tankers and goes for export to the World markets. CPC was established in July 1992 by the governments of Kazakhstan and Oman, later Russia joined the project. The construction started in May 1999, pipe laying was finished in November 2000. Finally, the production run initiated in April 2003 after receiving permission of the authorities. CPC terminal has three Single-Point Mooring systems, allowing safe oil offloading into tankers even in adverse weather conditions. Between January and November 2018 the terminal loaded 55.129 mln tons of oil from Karachaganak, Kashagan and Tengiz fields. By the end of 2018 Russian Federation owned the largest block of terminal shares (24% by Transneft and 7% by CPC Company), followed by Kazakhstan (19% by KazMunayGas and 1.75% by Kazakhstan Pipeline Ventures). Among other shareholders Chevron Caspian Pipeline Consortium Company has 15%, LukArco has 12.5%, Mobil Caspian Pipeline Company and Rosneft-Shell Caspian Ventures hold equal blocks of 7.5%, BG Overseas Holding and Eni International hold 2% each. Finally, 1% of CPC terminal shares is owned by Oryx Caspian Pipeline.

== Military harbour ==
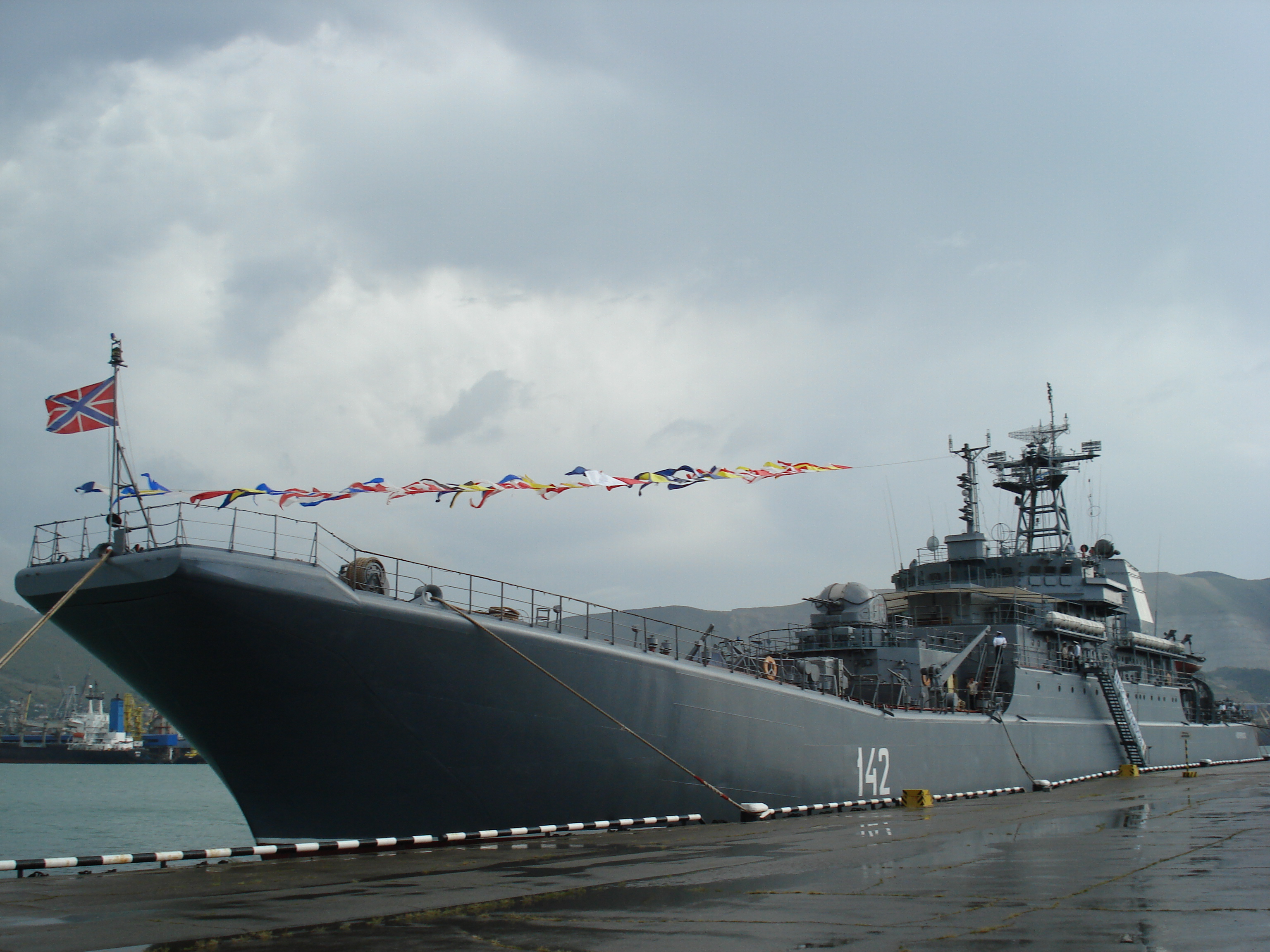
Large Landing Ship ‘Novocherkassk’ at NSP

Novorossiysk Naval Base was established by the Bolsheviks in 1920. During the Russian Civil War its fleet fought the White Army in Crimea and Transcaucasia. Active development of the base was stimulated by the deterioration of the political environment. In the years of the World War II Novorossiysk served as a stronghold for the occupied Sevastopol and Odesa, its marines took part in the Battle of the Kerch Peninsula and ensured the evacuation. After the war Sevastopol became the main base for the Soviet Navy's Black Sea Fleet and Novorossiysk military base was discontinued. The bay was reassigned as an administrative naval area. Later the USSR Ministry of Fisheries anchored there its submarine fleet and survey ships, consecutively the bay was renamed into ‘Geoport’.

During the late Soviet period Black Sea Navy Fleet forces were allocated in the Georgian SSR and Ukrainian SSR with bases in Sevastopol, Odesa, Batumi, and Poti. The dissolution of the Soviet Union brought up a question of headquarters relocation to Novorossiysk. In September 1994 Novorossiysk Naval area was reestablished, three years later it was officially reorganised into Novorossiysk Naval Base.

During the Russo-Ukrainian War a Ukrainian USV attacked the Russian Navy ship Olenegorsky Gornyak at the night to 4 August 2023 at the port. The vessel that normally operates in the Barents Sea is part of Russias Northern Fleet. According to Ukraine, the operation was carried out by Ukraine's security service, SBU with a sea drone carrying 450 kilograms of TNT.

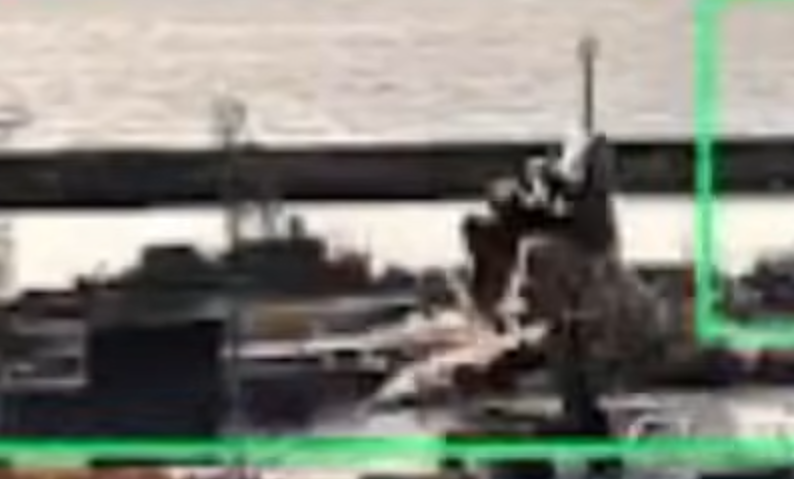
December 2025 explosion in the Port of Novorossiysk

In December 2025, the Security Service of Ukraine published a video from the Port of Novorossiysk showing an explosion against a pier off the stern of a Kilo-class submarine claiming an attack by a "Sub Sea Baby" underwater drone. The Russian Ministry of Defense denied that there had been damage. The UK Ministry of Defence considered it highly likely that the attacked submarine was the B-271 Kolpino and considered it likely that the attack had significantly damaged the submarine, leaving it unable to deploy or sail of its own accord.

== Other objects ==
=== Monuments ===
In November 1925 one of the first Soviet monuments to Vladimir Lenin was erected at the coastside of Tsemes Bay. The construction was crowdfunded by Black Sea region citizens and NSP employees. Vasily Kozlov designed the sculpture, L. and K. Dietrich and O. Domansky created the pedestal. The bronze figure was cast in Leningrad and delivered for the International Workers' Day on 1 May 1926. Later, during the war, the monument was mined by retreating German troops. After the liberation of the city the sculpture was repaired, in 1974 it was taken under state protection and granted regional significance status. In 1987—89 the status was upscaled to national significance. The total height of the monument is 6 meters, while only the sculpture is 1.8 m tall.

Another monument was opened in September 2018 at the Admiral Serebryakov Embankment. At the initiative of Delo's President Sergei Shishkarev the ‘Memorial to Port Workers’ was financed by Delo Group and NMTP with the participation of several private persons and companies. The opening ceremony coincided with the 180 anniversary of Novorossiysk, 75th jubilee of liberation of the city and 45th anniversary of receiving title of the hero city. The 2-meter high and 4m tall sculpture designed by Konstantin Kubishkin portrays a tally girl, two dock-engineers and a stevedore at work. Both granite tiles of the pedestal are covered with the text of the Nikolas I decree establishing the port in Novorossiysk.

=== Aleksino Port Marina ===
Aleksino Port Marina was established on the West coast of the Tsemes Bay and became operational in October 2011. The facility serves and repairs small vessels. The harbor is protected by L-shaped breakwater and equipped with 4 berths of 2—3 depth alongside. Initially the harbor was equipped to handle 35-meters long vessels up to 160 DWT, but in 2017—2018 the marina was modernised and upgraded to serve ships up to 450 DWT. The complex include multiple companies engaged in repairing, painting and other services. By 2017 Aleksino Port Marina was the largest ship-repair complex in Azov-Black Sea Basin. Nowadays it handles private, technical, harbour, and military (FSB crafts) vessels, regulated by RussianMaritime and River Registers. Aleksino Port Marina is a member of DeloPorts holding.

== Turnover ==
Cargo turnover

Year	2003	2004	2005	2006	2007	2008	2009	2010	2011	2012	2013	2014	2015	2016	2017	2018
Cargo turnover, mln tons	85.5	97.8	113.1	113.1	113.5	112.6	122.8	117.1	116.1	117.4	112.6	121.6	127.1	131.4	147.4	154.9
Growth, %	-	14.3	15.6	0	0	0	9	-4.6	-0.8	1.1	-4	8	4.5	3.4	12.2	5

== See also ==
- Tsemes Bay
