= Afipsky refinery =

Oil refinery in Afipsky, Russia

Afipsky Refinery
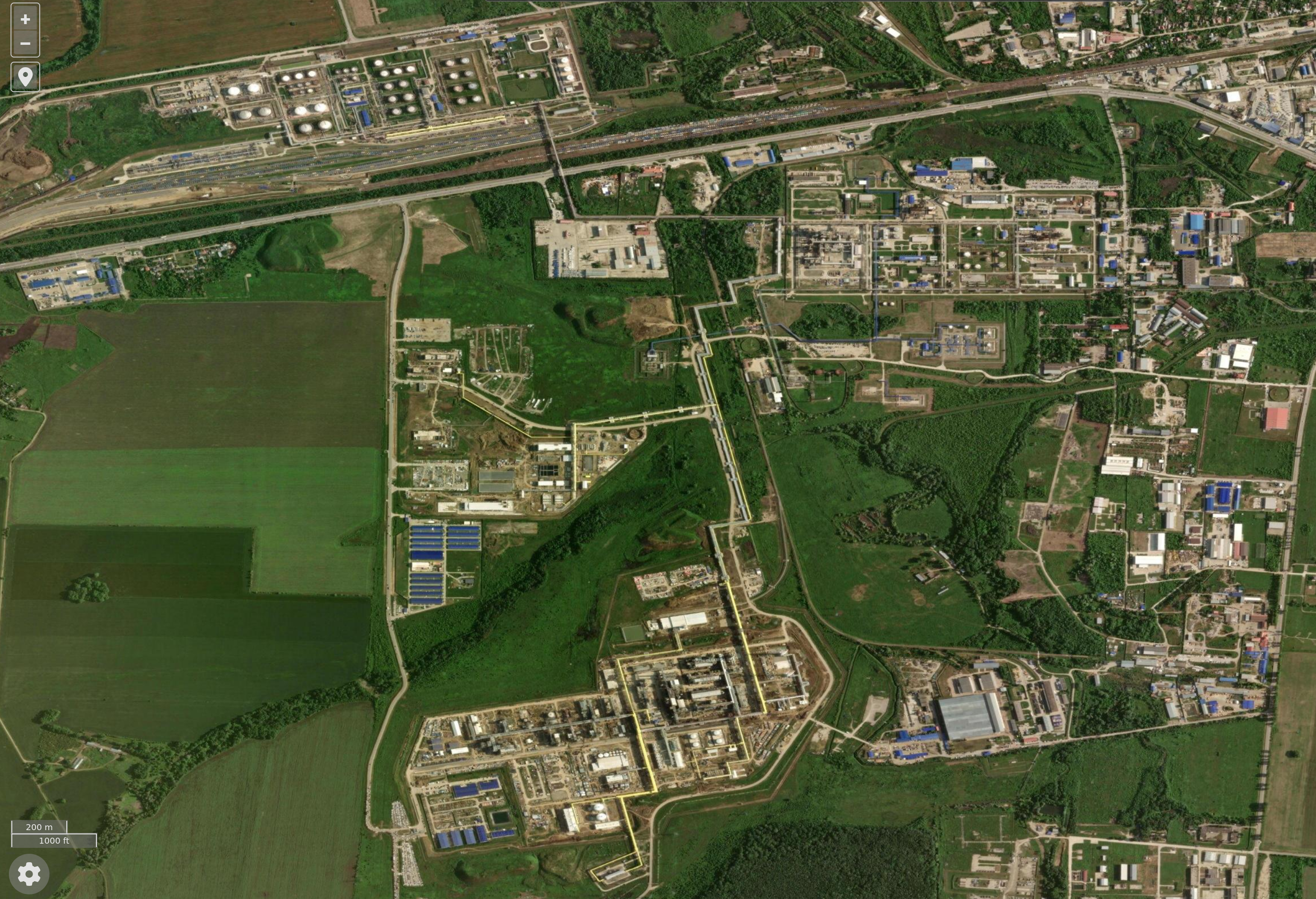
- Satellite imagery of Afipsky refinery

- Location within Krasnodar Krai Location within European Russia
- Interactive map of Afipsky Refinery
- Location: Afipsky, Krasnodar Krai, Russia; 44°52′54″N 38°49′19″E

Refinery details
- Operator: SAFMAR
- Opened: 1963
- No. of employees: ~1,500
- Website: afipnpz.ru

Afipsky Refinery (Russian: Афипский НПЗ) is a large oil refinery in the Russian city of Afipsky in Krasnodar Krai. The refinery's design capacity is 6.25 million tons per year, and 7.017 million tons were processed by 2022. This refinery is managed by Alexei Sidorov, and is part of the SAFMAR Group.

In 2022, the refinery had a revenue of 20.8 Billion Rubles, and a profit of 13.4 Billion Rubles.

== History ==
The decision to build a gas-petrol plant in Afipsky (for processing associated petroleum gas into petrol) was made in 1952. The design of the plant was entrusted to the Giprogaztopprom Institute. In 1960, when a significant part of the construction work had already been completed, the construction of the plant was mothballed due to the lack of the necessary equipment. In 1962, construction was resumed, and the first stage of the enterprise was put into operation in December 1963. Initially, the plant was engaged in the processing of gas condensate from fields in the Krasnodar Territory into A-66 petrol and diesel fuel.

In 1970, a secondary distillation unit and a catalytic reforming unit were put into operation. In 1978, process units were launched that made it possible to establish the production of benzene, toluene, xylene and high-octane gasoline.

In 1980, the production association Krasnodarnefteorgsintez was formed, which included the Krasnodar Oil Refinery, Tuapse Oil Refinery and Afip Oil Refinery.

In 1983, the plant commissioned its own flare system, which was used to dispose of waste oil products.

In 1994, the enterprise was corporatized and received the name AOOT Krasnodarnefteorgsintez, and since 1996 — OAO Rosneft — Krasnodarnefteorgsintez. In 2003, it was separated into OOO Afipsky Refinery. Since the 1990s, Afipsky PNZ has been reprofiled to process oil to produce gasoline and diesel fuel. In 2006, the United Oil Group (part of the Basic Element company) became the owner of Afipsky Refinery, and in 2010, the enterprise was transferred to the Neftegazindustriya company. In 2013–2017, the AT-22/4 oil product distillation unit was modernized, and vacuum distillation units for straight-run fuel oil, tar visbreaking, and hydrogen sulfide utilization were put into operation, which allowed almost doubling the oil refining capacity. In 2019, the plant became the property of the Safmar Group.

Since 2017, construction of a hydrocracking complex has been underway, including a hydrocracking unit with a capacity of 2.5 million tons per year, a hydrogen production unit with a capacity of 100 thousand tons per year, a sulfur production unit with a capacity of 100 thousand tons per year, and a sour water stripper and amine regeneration unit. The complex is scheduled to be commissioned in 2022. Construction of a delayed coking unit with a capacity of 1.6 million tons per year is also planned. The commissioning of these production complexes will increase the oil refining depth to 98%, the output of light petroleum products to 88%, and begin the production of gasoline and diesel fuel of the Euro-5 standard. Oil refining capacity should increase to 9 million tons, and fuel oil and vacuum gas oil will be excluded from the composition of the products.

In connection with the successful completion of the energy audit of the equipment in June 2018, an energy passport was received with a validity period until 2022.

In the fall of 2019, Sberbank's subsidiary, Sberbank Investments LLC, became a co-owner of the Afipsky Oil Refinery with 8% of the shares. In July of the same year, Safmar restructured the oil refinery's debt burden, and in October agreed to provide a loan of more than $1 billion to modernize the plant.

Since 2019, a large-scale reconstruction has been underway at the Afipsky Oil Refinery, in which approximately 140 billion rubles have been invested.

In February 2022, it became known that the Afip Oil Refinery reviewed design documentation and engineering survey results for the construction of a gasoline stabilization unit to produce raw materials for hydrogen production.

On February 10, 2025, during the Russo-Ukrainian War, Ukrainian drones attacked the refinery, causing fires in the area.

The refinery was again attacked by drones on March 13, 2026, and on the night of July 13 to 14, 2026.

== Raw materials and products ==
The enterprise processes a mixture of oil and gas condensate from the West Siberian and Volga-Ural fields, delivered via the Krymsk-Afipsky Oil Refinery, Khadyzhensk-Afipsky Oil Refinery pipelines and by rail.

The enterprise produces natural gasoline, diesel fuel, gas condensate distillates, vacuum gas oil, fuel oil, sulfur. According to the results of 2020, 4.927 million tons of raw materials were processed, 2.02 million tons of diesel fuel, 1.093 million tons of vacuum gas oil, 0.92 million tons of fuel oil, 0.8 million tons of natural gasoline were produced. The plant's products are mainly exported.

In August 2021, it became known that the Afipsky Oil Refinery plans to start producing EURO-5 diesel fuel in 2023 after the implementation of the investment agreement on modernization.

== See also ==
- List of oil refineries
- Petroleum industry in Russia
