= Bashneft-Novoil =

Russian oil company

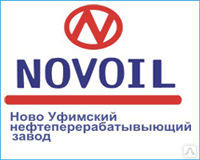
- Logo used since 2014
- Type: Public
- Traded as: MICEX
- Industry: Oil Refining
- Predecessor: Novo-Ufimsky refinery plant
- Founded: 1951
- Headquarters: Ufa, Bashkortostan
- Area served: Ufa, Bashkortostan
- Key people: Sarvarov Ildous Irekovich
- Products: gasoline, jet fuel, diesel fuel, engine, transmission and other special oils, vacuum gas oil, paraffin-wax products, oil bitumens, boiler fuel, coke, lump sulphur
- Parent: Bashneft

Bashneft-Novoil is a producer of petroleum products in Russia.

The current production facilities of Bashneft – Novoil include primary oil refining, hydrotreatment, reforming and iso-reforming, sulphuric acid alkylation, thermocracking and visbreaking, coking and gas fractionation, solvent refining and dewaxing of oil distillates, tar deasphalting and bitumen production, gas desulphurization and sulphur production units as well as environmental facilities.

The flexible technological schemes refine various types of hydrocarbons — low- and high-sulphur crude oil, various gas condensates as well as medium and heavy distillates obtained at other refineries of Ufa Group, producing a wide range of petroleum products.

In 2011, the refinery continued to produce Euro-3 and Euro-4 engine fuels. There are plans to start producing Euro-5 fuel in the near future.

== History ==
In 1947, Trust No.21 was established for the construction of a new oil refinery for the processing of oil from the Ishimbai oil field ("Second Baku"). In 1951, the construction of the first stage of the Novo-Ufa oil Refinery was completed. On July 25, 1951, the first gasoline was received at the plant's AVT-1 installation.

Since 1993, it has been an open joint stock company. Since 1994, it has been a member of the Bashkir Petrochemical Company. In 1999, the refining capacity was 8.5 million tons of oil per year with a potential of about 19 million tons. In 2018, the production of Euro-6 gasoline began. In 2020, the plant was switched to the production of aviation fuel of the RT brand of the highest category.

On 13 September 2025, social media videos emerged of the facility reportedly being hit by Ukrainian drones.

== Directors ==
- 1951–1953 — Mayorov Boris Pavlovich
- 1957–1965 — Ivanovsky Georgy Fedorovich
- since October 21, 2020 – Mikhailov Sergey Yurievich

== See also ==
- List of oil refineries
- Petroleum industry in Russia
