= Nevskaya Oil Pipeline Company LLC =

Russian oil terminal company

Coordinates: 59°42′N 28°26′E

Nevskaya Oil Pipeline Company
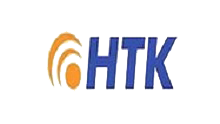
- Industry: Shipping industry
- Founded: 2010
- Headquarters: leningrad, Russia
- Key people: KHAMLAY KONSTANTIN VIKTOROVICH, (Director General)
- Products: Tanker terminal
- Website: np74.ru

Nevskaya Pipeline Company LLC is an oil terminal company operating in Ust-Luga Port, Russia. It was originally controlled by Gunvor; however, as of 2015 it was owned by Gazprombank (74%) and Transneft (26%). . Its terminal with a capacity of 30 million tonnes per year is the end point of the Baltic Pipeline System-II.
