= Ryazan refinery =

Oil refinery in Ryazan, Russia

Ryazan Refinery
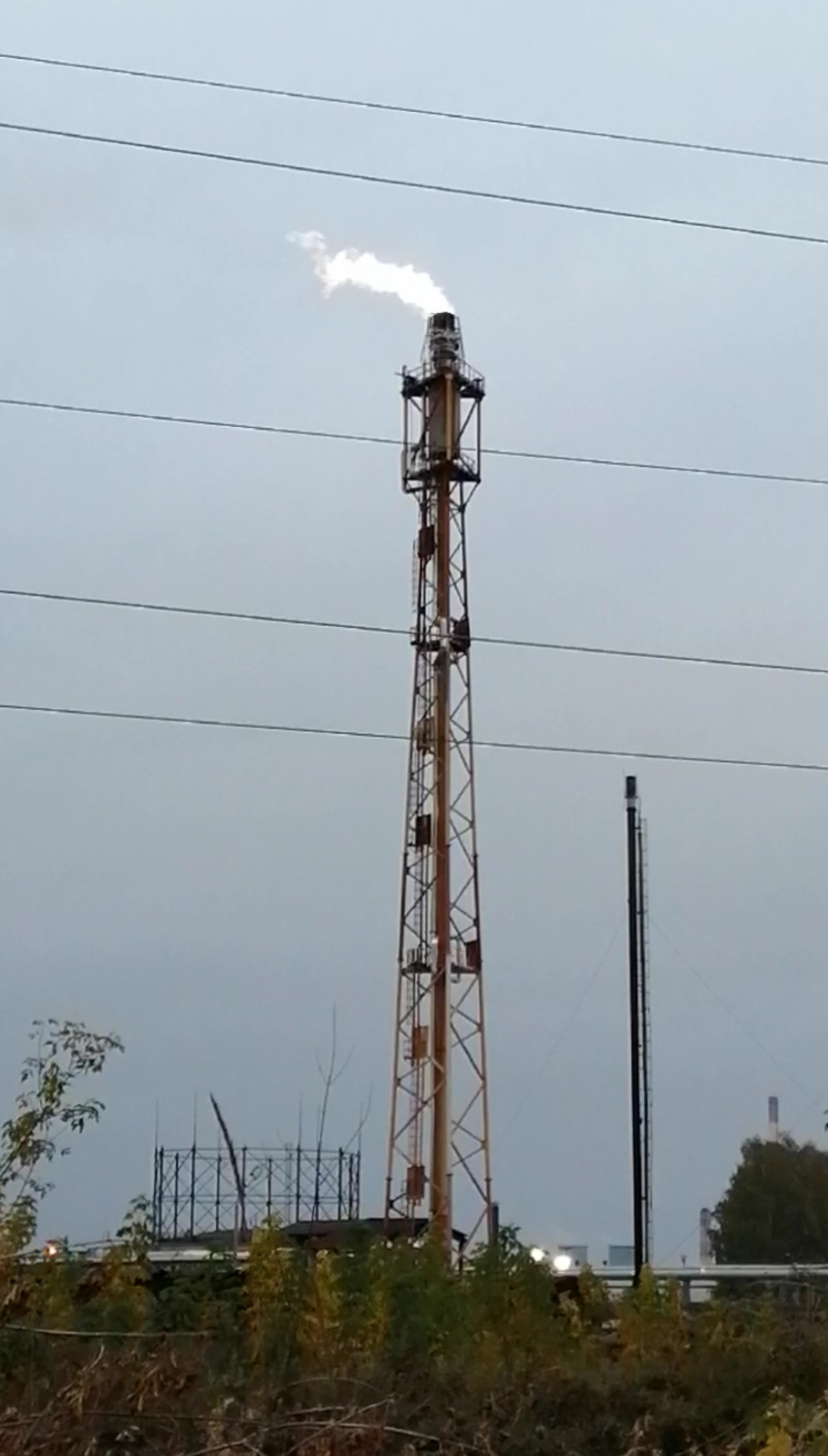
- Gas flare at the Ryazan refinery

- Location within Ryazan Oblast Location within European Russia
- Interactive map of Ryazan Refinery
- Location: Ryazan, Russia; 54°34′33″N 39°44′37″E

Refinery details
- Operator: Rosneft
- Opened: 1960

The Ryazan Refinery (Russian: Рязанский нефтеперерабатывающий заводз) is an oil refinery in the Russian city of Ryazan, one of the largest in the country. This refinery has belonged to the Russian state-owned company Rosneft since 2013.

== History ==
=== Soviet period ===
In October 1960, the oil refinery opened in the city of Ryazan, and became the industrial core in the area around the city.

In August 1974, the Supreme Soviet awarded workers of the plant with honorary medals for their work.

=== Post-Soviet period ===
In 1993, the plant became privatized, and became a joint-stock company in 2002. From 2003 to 2013, the plant was a part of TNK-BP, and was modernized. Since 2013, the plant has been controlled by the state-owned Rosneft.

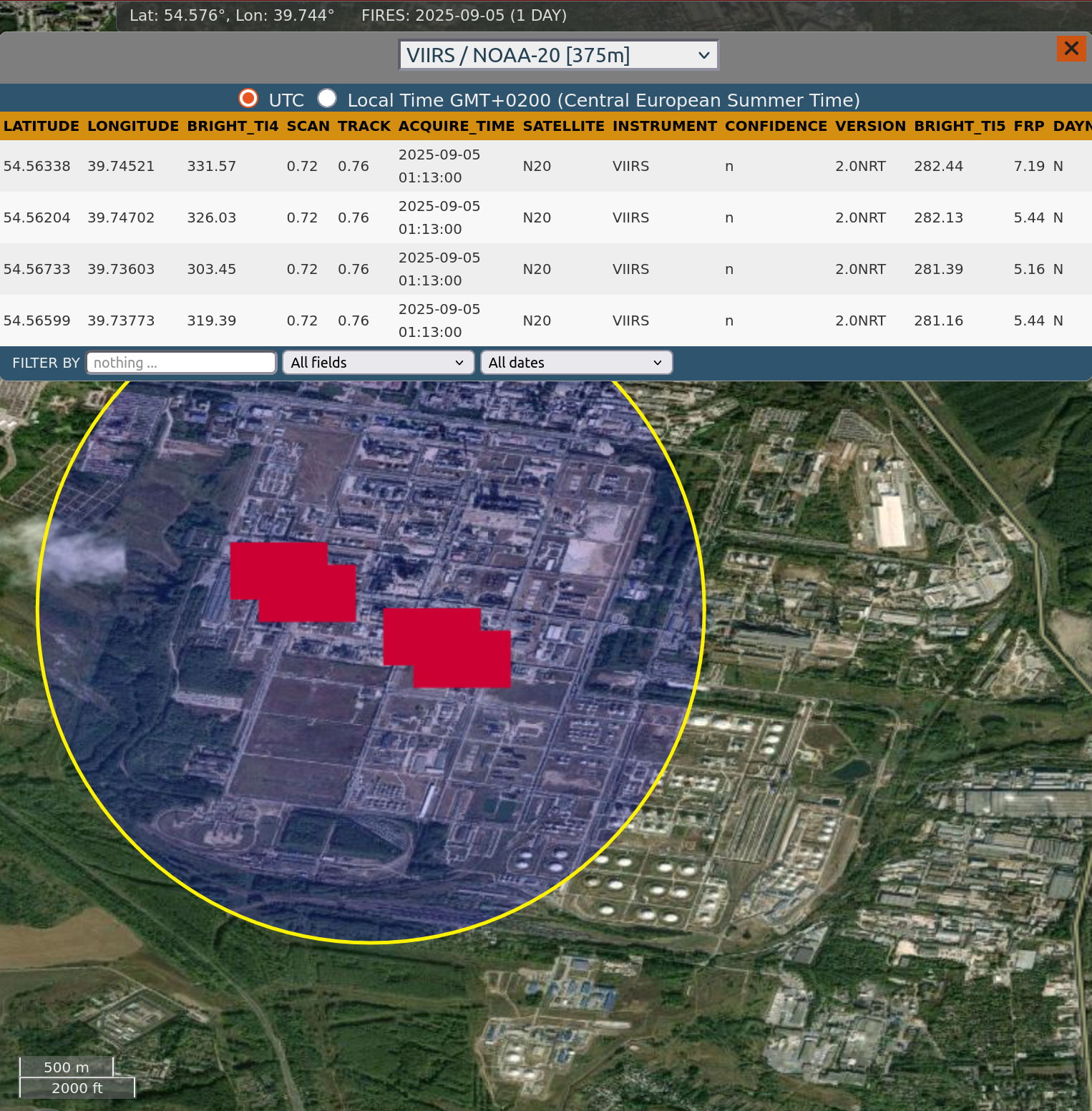
NASA's FIRMS detected fires on 5 September 2025 01:13:00 (UTC) at the Ryazan refinery

In March and May 2024, during the Russo-Ukrainian War, the refinery was hit twice by drones of the Armed Forces of Ukraine. In January 2025, the refinery was once again hit by drones from the Armed Forces of Ukraine. Following another attack in late February 2025, all operations were suspended due to damage to the main crude distillation unit. On 5 September 2025 Ukrainian drones again struck and caused fires at the refinery. On December 6, the Ukrainian military reported its 9th successful strike on the refinery during 2025. On 15th of May 2026 the refinery was hit again.

== Production ==
In the year 2016, the processing volume at the plant was at 15.35 million tons per year (approximately 309,000 barrels per day), slightly down from 16 million in 2015. In 2024, the plant processed about 5% of Russia's refinery output; it converted 13 million tons of crude oil into 2.2 million tons of gasoline, 3.4 million tons of diesel, 4.3 million tons of fuel oil and 1 million tons of jet fuel.

== See also ==
- List of oil refineries
- Petroleum industry in Russia
