= Port of Rostov-on-Don =

Port in Russia

Rostov Sea Trade Port Ростовский Морской Торговый порт
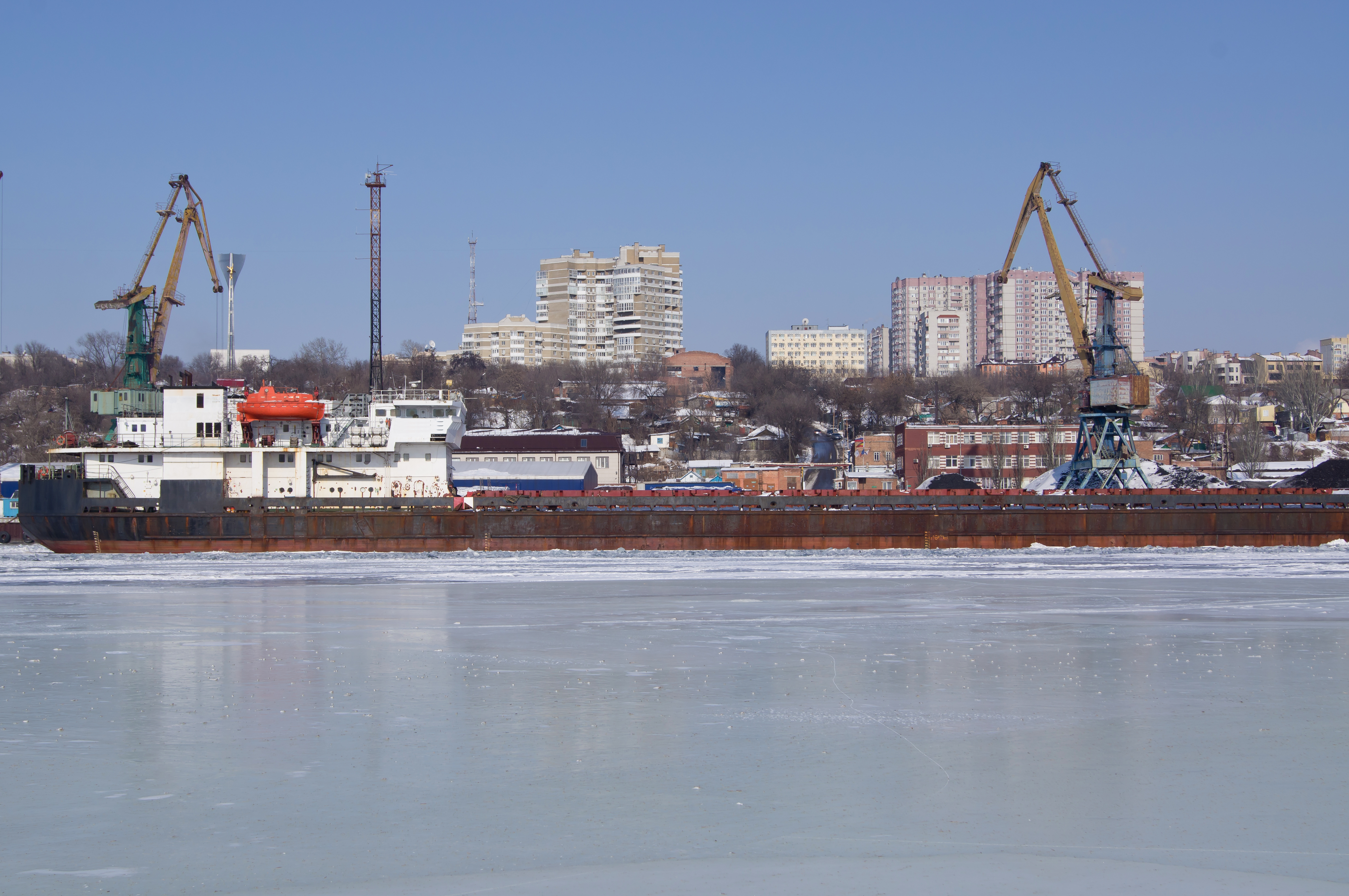
- Interactive map of Rostov Sea Trade Port; Ростовский Морской Торговый порт

Location
- Country: Russia
- Location: Rostov-on-Don
- Coordinates: 47°10′N 39°42′E
- UN/LOCODE: RURND

Details
- Owned by: JSC "Rostov port", LLC "Rostov universal port" (RUP) and other companies
- Land area: 9 348,56 meters of berths
- No. of berths: 56
- No. of wharfs: 2

Statistics
- Annual cargo tonnage: ▲11.6 million tonnes (2015) (+12.5%)
- Main trades: metals, corn, coal
- Website rostov.azovseaports.ru

The Port of Rostov-on-Don is a major sea and river port, and one of the oldest in Russia. The port has 56 berths and a berth wall length of over 9000 m. The carrying capacity of its cargo terminals is around 18 million tons per year, which puts it in the top 15 largest Russian sea ports. The total number of stevedores is 24. Structurally, it consists of port facilities belonging to JSC "Rostov port", LLC "Rostov universal port" (RUP) and other companies.

== JSC "Rostov port" ==
It has four geographically independent cargo areas:

- 1st cargo area (central cargo area) - it is located in the central part of Rostov-on-Don (on the right bank of the Don River, in the Nakhichevan duct)
- 2nd cargo area (Alekandrovsky bucket, on the left bank of the Don)
- 3rd cargo district (Rostov bucket, on the left bank of the Don)
- 4th cargo area (in the industrial area "Zarechnaya", on the left bank of the Don).

JSC "Rostov port" can simultaneously handle up to 16 vessels of up to 5000 tonnes of river-sea class of the following types: the Volga-Balt, Volga-Don, Sormovo, Siberia, Omsk, Amur and others, including foreign vessels with similar characteristics and a draft of up to 4 meters. Central cargo area under the general plan of the city of Rostov-on-Don is planned to withdraw from the city center.

== LLC "Rostov Universal Port" ==
Rostov Universal Port is the project of three cargo areas, located on the left bank of the river. Don in the industrial zone "Zarechnaya":

- 1st cargo area,
- 2nd cargo area,
- 3rd cargo area (projected) - planned to connect the channel and expand the old quarry near the existing cargo areas.

In 2014 the port has a container (delivery of a weekly container line along the route Rostov-on-Don - Istanbul), coal, grain and a terminal of general goods situated on an area of 100 hectares, has 7 berths with a length of the quay wall 1,150 meters, open storage areas area of 90 thousand square meters.

Further development and construction of the third cargo area will create up to 27 general-purpose and specialized berthing facilities, increase the port area to 400 hectares. By order of the Russian Federation from 20.05.2008 № 377 investment project "Development of RUP" given the status of national importance. In addition the project is included in the federal target program "Development of Transport System of Russia" (2010-2015 gg. And up to 2020). The design capacity of the port will reach 16 million tons per year.

== Other terminals ==
Own marinas have a number of production companies used them to transport their goods:

- Oil extraction plant "Yug Rusi" (Industrial Area "Zarechnaya")
- Petroleum products transshipment terminal "Yug Rusi" (Industrial Area "Zarechnaya" for Nizhnegnilovskim bridge in the direction of the Sea of Azov)
- OJSC "Aston" (Industrial Area "Zarechnaya")
- "Donskoy prichal" (Industrial Area "Zarechnaya")
- Cargil (Industrial Area " Zarechnaya")
- JSC "Rostov-on-Don Bakery" (Rostov bucket)
- Rostov Shipyard "Priboy" (Rostov bucket)
- Rostov Shipyard "Mayak" (Industrial Area "Zarechnaya")
- Tobacco company "Donskoy Tabak"

== Annual cargo tonnage ==
- 2009: 6.2 million tonnes
- 2010: 7.7 million tonnes (▲)
- 2011: 10.4 million tonnes (▲)
- 2012: 11.1 million tonnes (▲8.0%)
- 2013: 10.8 million tonnes (▼-2.7%)
- 2014: 10.4 million tonnes (▼-4.5%)
- 2015: 11.6 million tons (▲12.1%)
