= Perm refinery =

Russian oil refinery located in Perm

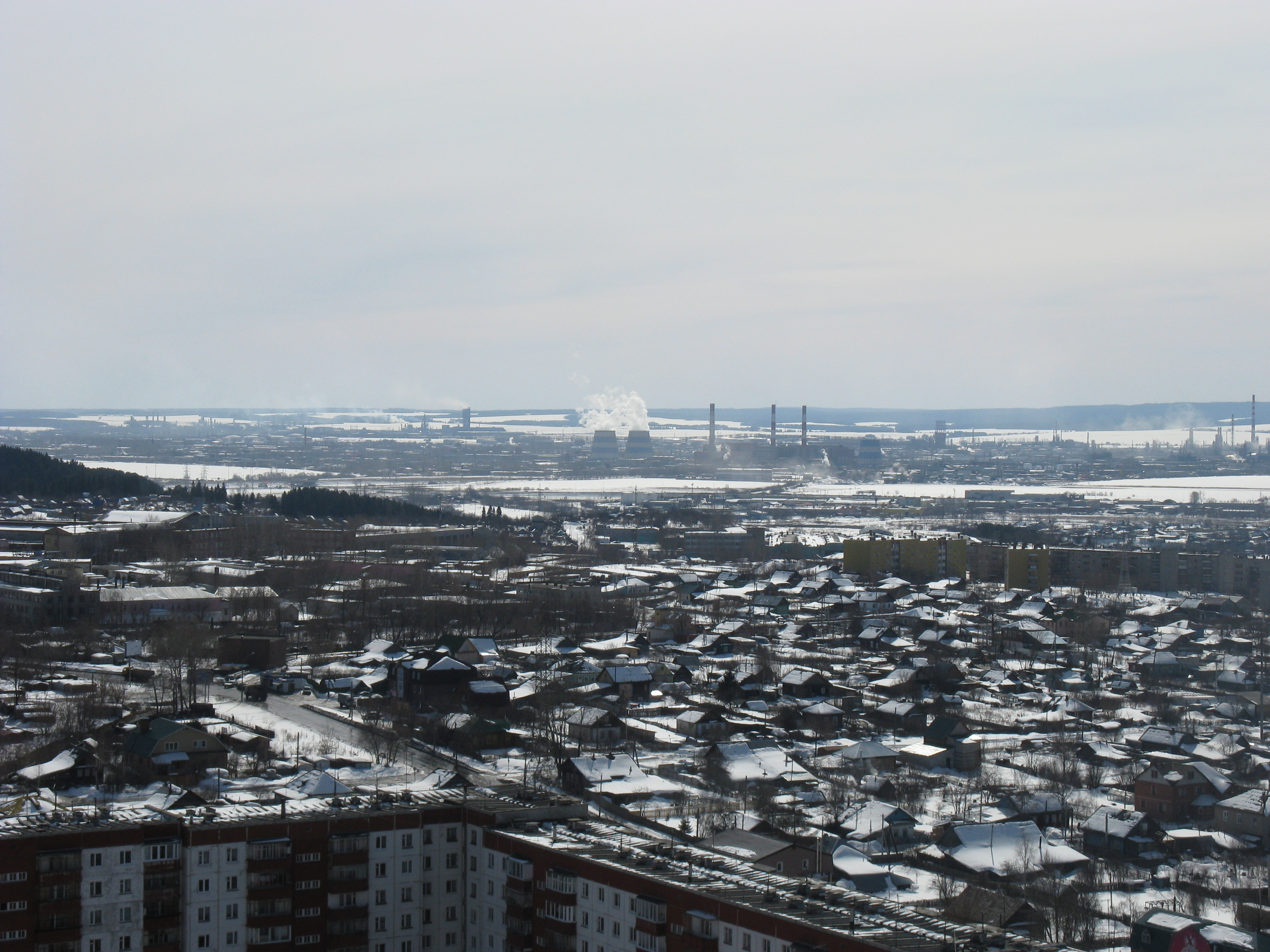
- Perm refinery site as seen from Perm, Perm Krai

- Location within Perm Krai Location within European Russia
- Interactive map of Perm refinery
- Location: Perm, Perm Krai, Russian Federation; 57°55′00″N 56°07′40″E

Refinery details
- Operator: Lukoil-Permnefteorgsintez
- Owner: Lukoil
- Opened: 1958
- Capacity: 226,000 barrels per day (35,900 m^{3}/d)
- No. of employees: ~2,400
- Website: pnos.lukoil.ru

The Perm refinery (Russian: Пéрмский НПЗ, romanized: Pérmskiy NPZ, IPA: [pʲɪrʲmskʲɪj]) is a Russian oil refinery located south of the city of Perm in Perm Krai. As of 2025, it is one of the largest oil refineries in Russia, maintaining the capacity to process 13.1 million tons of crude oil per year. Currently, the refinery produces over sixty different petroleum products for local and international markets from crude deriving from the West Siberian basin, transported via the Surgut-Polotsk, Kamenny Log-Perm, Severokamsk-Perm and Kungur-Perm pipelines. This includes various grades of gasoline and diesel, as well as aviation fuel, bunker fuel and liquefied petroleum gases. These products are then transported by road, rail or ship on the nearby Kama River, in addition to being exported via the Perm-Andreevka-Ufa pipeline. Before the Russian invasion of Ukraine in 2022, approximately half of the products produced by the refinery were exported to international markets, but this total has since declined. In the first half of 2025, the Perm refinery accounted for 7.3% of all liquefied petroleum gas exports from Russia.

Production first started at the Perm refinery in 1958, after which it expanded rapidly to emerge as one of the most efficient refineries in the Soviet Union. Since its privatization in 1993, the Perm Refinery has been owned and operated by a subsidiary of Lukoil, Lukoil-Permnefteorgsintez (Russian: Лукойл-Пéрмнéфтéоргсинтéз, lit. 'Lukoil-Perm oil and organic synthesis'). Under Lukoil's ownership, the refinery has received significant financial investment and has received praise and awards for its environmental, labor and safety initiatives. Despite this, two workers were killed, and another hospitalized, after a hydrogen sulfide leak in 2009. There have also been multiple fires at the plant since 2012, although none of these incidents resulted in fatalities.

== History ==
=== Construction ===
Plans for the construction of a new oil refinery in its present location were approved by the Council of Ministers of the Soviet Union on September 1, 1949, who also approved similar plans for new refineries in the cities of Ufa, Kuybyshev, Orsk, Gorky, Grozny, Ryazan, Stalingrad and Baku. An area of wasteland near the city of Molotov, which would change its name to Perm in 1958, was chosen for its strategic location near the Trans-Siberian Railway and the Kama River. The refinery broke ground two years later in January 1951 and was designated as a shock construction project, with 900 members of Komsomol arriving from the North Caucasus to work on the site. The majority of construction works were completed by local workers, alongside prisoners from gulags and foreign labor from China. The initial phase of construction was completed seven years later, with production commencing at the new refinery in November 1958.

By the end of 1958, the refinery was connected to a 448 km pipeline to Almetyevsk in Tatarstan, in addition to a 17 km tram line linking the refinery to the center of the city of Perm. At this time, production at the refinery was limited to kerosene, diesel, gasoline and fuel oil, although construction of new facilities at the complex continued. Within five years of starting operations, production of refined products at the site had doubled, and by the mid-1960s there were thirty different installations at the refinery. This included an additional 70 km pipeline linking the refinery to the Yarino-Kamennolozhskoye oilfield, catalytic reformation units and facilities to produce bitumen, paraffin and low-sulfur fuels.

=== Expansion though 1960s, 70s and 80s ===
Construction began on a new petrochemical plant at the complex in 1965, and over the next decade the refinery began producing various petrochemicals, such as ethylene, propylene, ethylbenzene and butyl alcohols. In 1971, the association controlling the refinery was also allocated control of an additional oil refinery in Krasnokamsk, located over 30 km from the main facility in Perm to the north of the Kama River. By the fifteenth anniversary of the Perm refinery commencing operations, it was the sixth largest refinery by production in the Soviet Union. Three years after this milestone, construction began at a fertilizer plant within the refinery complex on February 12, 1976, following a resolution by the Central Committee of the CPSU and the Council of Ministers of the Soviet Union entitled On Measures for the Development of the Industry of Mineral Fertilizers and Chemical Plant Protection Products in 1976-1980.

With the refinery now also producing significant quantities of ammonia and urea, its capacity to process crude oil was expanded further in 1979 when a further pipeline connection between the refinery and the city of Surgut was commissioned. As a result, the state-owned enterprise controlling the Perm refinery had emerged as the largest in the Soviet Union by the early 1980s. At its peak in 1983, the refinery employed approximately 10,000 staff and produced 87 types of products.

However, the refinery had begun to fall into decline by the end of the decade after it lost all state-funded subsidies in 1987, and was forced to be financially self-sustaining for the first time in its history. Consequently, the leadership made changes to make production economically viable, such as processing crude to achieve a higher yield and developing additional refining processes at the site.

=== Post-Soviet privatization and expansion between 1990s and 2022 ===
At the time of the dissolution of the Soviet Union in 1991, the Perm refinery had ceased production of fertilizers, lubricants and petrochemicals, with each of the respective plants closed. In 1993, the state-owned enterprise controlling the refinery was privatized and acquired by Lukoil, who immediately commenced an overhaul of the refinery. Within three years, the Perm refinery became one of the first in the Russian Federation to produce diesel for export in conformity with European emission standards. This was later facilitated by the construction of the Perm-Andreevka-Ufa pipeline at a cost of 3.2 billion rubles in 2001, which enabled products from the refinery to be transported to the port of Ventspils in Latvia. The pipeline, which is 335 km in length and capable of transporting 2.4 million tons of petroleum products, was the first major private pipeline project in the post-Soviet era.

All the facilities within the refinery complex had been rebuilt and modernized by the mid-2000s, including a new coking plant and vacuum distillation tower. As a result, Lukoil-Permnefteorgsintez significantly increased production of diesel and gasoline to 1.2 million tons annually without similarly increasing the volume of crude oil utilized in the refining process. Investment in the refinery continued into the next decade, with Lukoil announcing plans in 2013 to spend over $70 million reconstructing both the hydrodesulfurization plant and the hydrodearomatization unit to increase capacity of diesel production by 325 thousand tons. As a result, diesel production at the Perm refinery equated to four million tons by the end of 2014. Following this increase, Lukoil considered reconstructing the Perm-Andreevka-Ufa pipeline, although this project has not yet materialized.

In January 2016, over five thousand railway wagons were transporting crude oil and refined petroleum to and from the refinery per month, according to Russian Railways. Later that year, Sergey Andronov was appointed as the General Director of Lukoil-Permnefteorgsintez, a position he still holds as of 2025. Two years after his appointment, the Ministry of Energy awarded the company a Certificate of Honor in 2018 to commemorate sixty years since the refinery commenced operations and to recognize its contribution to the oil and gas industry in Perm Krai during that time. However, this award came during a period when operations at the refinery were routinely disrupted by major fires, with incidents reported in 2017, 2019 and 2021.

By 2020, the Perm refinery had emerged as the most efficient in the Russian Federation, processing 99.2% of the crude oil it received into petroleum products. Additional investment into the facilities of the Perm refinery to improve efficiency further was announced in September 2020 as a part of a broader social and economic cooperation agreement signed by Lukoil and the then acting Governor of Perm Krai, Dmitry Makhonin.

=== Effect of invasion of Ukraine ===
Proposals to build a catalytic cracking complex were announced in August 2021, although the project faced significant delays because of the Russian invasion of Ukraine in February 2022 and did not commence until August 2025.

During the war, the refinery has been subject to attacks by long-range drones from Ukraine, but these attacks have to date been smaller in scope and number than the attacks faced by other refineries in Russia. This has been because of the significant distance between the Perm complex and Ukrainian-controlled territory. One of the most significant attacks occurred on the 29th of April 2026 which has caused an environmental disaster in the area known as the Perm disaster.

In March 2022, Lukoil-Permnefteorgsintez became one of the first companies to resume exports of liquefied petroleum gas to Afghanistan after the Taliban returned to power in August 2021.

However, exports to other countries fell considerably because of the sanctions imposed by the European Union, the United Kingdom and the United States as a consequence of the Russian invasion earlier that year. Since July 2023, the company controlling the Perm refinery, Lukoil-Permnefteorgsintez, has been subject to sanctions by Ukraine. Lukoil has denied that the Perm refinery produced 6,500 metric tons of toluene, a key chemical used in the production of TNT, for munitions factories in Russia following an investigation by Reuters in 2024.

== See also ==
- 2026 Perm environmental disaster
- List of oil refineries
- Petroleum industry in Russia
