= Novorossiysk Fuel Oil Terminal =

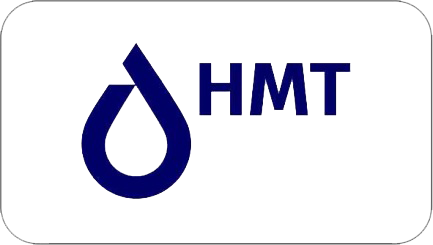
- Industry: Shipping industry
- Founded: 2009
- Headquarters: Novorossiysk, Russia
- Key people: Ziyavudin Magomedov, (Chairman)
- Products: Tanker terminal
- Website: nfot.info

Novorossiysk Fuel Oil Terminal is an oil terminal located in Novorossiysk, Russia. It is jointly owned by Gunvor and Novorossiysk Commercial Sea Port. The terminal in Novorossiysk was commissioned in 2012. The terminal has a capacity of 119,000 cubic metres (4,200,000 cu ft) and a throughput of 5 million tons a year. The terminal in Tuapse consists of three oil-handling sites with a total storage capacity of 198,600 cubic metres (7,010,000 cu ft), including 37,000 cubic metres (1,300,000 cu ft) of its own tanks. In the port of Nakhodka, Primorsky Region, it leases tanks of 67,000 cubic metres (2,400,000 cu ft). The company's bunkering facilities in Primorsk Port of Leningrad Oblast have a total capacity of 219,000 cubic metres (7,700,000 cu ft).

== Terminal ==
Novorossiysk Fuel Oil Terminal is planned to accommodate tankers 40-47 thousand tons. However, due to the proximity of the grain terminal in court on oil and grain terminals will wind up consistently for security purposes. The new terminal will be located near the terminal for transshipment of diesel fuel, Jet Fuel, M100. Recall, OJSC Novorossiysk commercial sea port and oil trader Gunvor own 50% in LLC Novorossiysk fuel oil terminal".

The terminal was attacked by drones and missiles that suspended its operations in May 2024.
