= SAFMAR =

Russian multisectoral conglomerate

- Company type: Industrial and Financial Group
- Traded as: MCX: SFIN
- Industry: Oil, coal, financial services, construction, development, property, media
- Founded: 2015
- Founder: Mikhail Gutseriyev
- Headquarters: Moscow, Russia
- Revenue: 1 400 bn rubles
- Operating income: 300 bn rubles
- Parent: Russneft
- Website: www.safmargroup.ru

Industrial and Financial Group SAFMAR is a Russian multisectoral conglomerate. The group includes oil producing and processing companies, coal and potash enterprises, financial assets, retail chains, construction and development holdings, commercial property management firms, logistics centres, hotels, and media assets – among them radio stations and television channels.

== History ==
Safmar Group was established by Mikhail Gutseriev, a Russian entrepreneur. The name SAFMAR is derived from the first letters of his parents' names: Safarbek and Marem. The industrial companies owned by Mr Gutseriev became the cornerstone of the group. Their dynamic development made it possible to allocate funds for the acquisition of new assets in various sectors, thereby leading to business diversification. This portfolio of assets required efficient management, which led to the incorporation of a joint‑stock company, Safmar Group. Mikhail Gutseriev serves as the Chairman of the Group's Board of Directors and determines the conglomerate's development strategy.

In 2019, two major industrial companies were incorporated into SAFMAR Group. In April, the holding purchased the Afipsky oil refinery, and in October SAFMAR became the majority shareholder in Kuzbasskaya Toplivnaya Company PJSC.

In September 2019, SAFMAR Industrial and Financial Group was included in the RBK 500 top list, ranking ninth among the largest state and private corporations in Russia. In 2020, the group confirmed its position in this ranking and also entered the top‑10 list of the largest 400 companies in Russia, according to the Expert media holding. Safmar Group achieved similar results in 2021.

Forbes Russia ranked the Gutseriev family as the leader among the richest Russian families, with a combined fortune of US$5.65 billion.

== Courts ==
In October 2019, Forbes Russia published an article about a trillion‑ruble debt incurred by the Gutseriev family and Mr Shishkhanov, his nephew, which had allegedly been uncovered by Trust, a bank specialising in 'toxic' assets. Safmar stated that the information was "fake news" and "a perfect example of the most corrupted and cheapest yellow press". The company also claimed that some of the information was "far‑fetched" and "invented", and did not rule out taking legal action for defamation. Ultimately, a defamation claim against Safmar was brought by the publisher of Forbes Russia. On 10 December, Safmar and Mikhail Gutseriev filed a claim against the magazine with the Arbitration Court of Moscow, demanding the removal of the article. In December 2019, the magazine's editors removed the material from the publication's website, acknowledging it as erroneous, and the dispute was settled out of court.

== Assets ==
Currently, Safmar's major assets are concentrated in the following industrial sectors.

=== Heavy industry ===
The group's assets include:

- PJSC RussNeft, an oil‑producing holding. The company operates in seven Russian regions. The holding's structure includes:
  - OAO Varioganneft (Khanty‑Mansi Autonomous Region);
  - OAO Aganneftegazgeologiya (Khanty‑Mansi Autonomous Region);
  - OAO NAK Aki-Otyr (Khanty‑Mansi Autonomous Region);
  - OOO Beliye Nochi (Khanty‑Mansi Autonomous Region);
  - ST AO Goloil (Khanty‑Mansi Autonomous Region);
  - OAO Chernogorskoye (Khanty‑Mansi Autonomous Region);
  - OAO Saratovneftegaz (Saratov Region);
  - OAO Ulyanovskneft (Ulyanovsk and Penza Regions);
  - OAO Tomskaya Neft (Tomsk Region);
  - OOO NK Russneft-Bryansk (operating an oil‑loading terminal in Bryansk Region).
- Neftisa, an oil‑producing company with subsidiaries in seven regions of Russia:
  - AO Belkamneft named after A. Volkov (Udmurtia);
  - AO Novosibirskneftegaz (Novosibirsk Region);
  - AO Komnedra (Komi Republic);
  - OOO CanBaikal (Khanty‑Mansi Autonomous Region);
  - OOO PIT Cibintek (Tyumen Region);
  - AO Samarainvestneft (Samara Region);
  - AO Uralnefteservis (Perm Region).
- OOO Sladkovsko-Zarechnoye (oil production in Orenburg Region).
- AO ForteInvest, a vertically integrated company managing the following assets:
  - PSJC Orsknefteorgsintez (Orenburg Region);
  - OOO Afipsky NPZ (Krasnodar Region);
  - producing companies in Orenburg Region.
- PJSC Adamas Company (manages AO Krasnodarsky Refinery – Krasnodareconeft).
- PJSC Russian Coal, with six subsidiaries operating in four regions of Russia:
  - AO Amurugol (Amur Region);
  - AO Kranoyarskkrayugol (Krasnoyarsk Region);
  - Sayano-Partizansky Pit (Krasnoyarsk Region);
  - AO UK Stepnoy Pit (Khakassia);
  - OOO Kirbinsky Pit (Khakassia);
  - PJSC Kuzbasskaya Toplivnaya Company (Kemerovo).
- GCM Global Energy Inc. (owns producing assets in the Republic of Azerbaijan and the Republic of Kazakhstan).
- OOO Slavkaliy (implementing a major investment project for the construction of a mining complex in Belarus, with an annual production capacity of 2 million tons of potassium; proved and probable reserves from the site's first and second horizons amount to 112 million tons of potassium chloride, according to the JORC code).

The revenue from the conglomerate's industrial assets in 2021 exceeded 1.1 trillion rubles.

Light industry is represented within the group by OAO Saltykovsky Fur Farm, which breeds elite fur‑bearing animals (sable, mink, fox and others) and engages in the wholesale of fur from the aforementioned animals, as well as the sale of live animals and meat products.

=== Construction and development ===
SAFMAR Group owns major construction and development assets:

- AO Mospromstroy (one of the leading construction holdings in Moscow);
- GK A101 (a full‑service development company).

The group is one of the largest developers in the Moscow region and owns one of the best portfolios of land plots in New Moscow (exceeding 2,500 hectares).

=== Hospitality business ===
Safmar Group is a leader in the hospitality business in Moscow, owning nine luxury hotels in the Russian capital, as well as hotels in Minsk and Astana. These include the National Hotel, Intercontinental Tverskaya, Sheraton Palace, Marriott Grand, Marriott Royal Aurora, Marriott Tverskaya, Hilton Leningradskaya, Holiday Inn Lesnaya, Holiday Inn Sushevskiy, Renaissance Minsk and Astana Marriott. The total capacity of these hotels is 2,794 rooms.

=== Property management ===
Safmar Group owns:

- PJSC A.N.D. Corporation (manages shopping malls and office property in the Moscow Region);
- MLP Company (owns nine major logistics complexes in Russia and the CIS countries);
- OOO Pioner Estate (manages multi‑purpose commercial property).

The total area of the group's commercial property exceeds 3,500,000 m^{2} (38,000,000 sq ft).

In its Kings of Russian Property rating, Forbes awarded Safmar Group third place, which received US$580 million in annual rental income in 2019.

=== Media assets ===
Safmar owns seven federal radio stations and Bridge Media, a television holding.

Radio stations:

- Radio Shanson;
- Radio Dacha;
- Vesna FM;
- Vostok FM;
- Love Radio;
- Russian Hit;
- Taxi FM.

Television channels:

- Bridge TV;
- Bridge TV Russian Hit;
- Bridge TV Classic;
- Bridge TV Hits;
- Bridge TV Deluxe;
- Bridge TV Shlyager;
- Bridge TV Kazakhstan.

== See also ==
- Petroleum industry in Russia
