= List of rural localities in Ingushetia =

Map of Russia with Ingushetia highlighted

This is a list of rural localities in Ingushetia. The Republic of Ingushetia (/ˌɪŋɡʊˈʃɛtiə/; Russian: Респу́блика Ингуше́тия, romanized: Respublika Ingushetiya, IPA: [rʲɪˈspublʲɪkə ɪnɡʊˈʂetʲɪjə]; Ingush: ГIалгIай Мохк, romanized: Ghalghaj Moxk), also referred to as simply Ingushetia, is a federal subject of the Russian Federation (a republic), located in the North Caucasus region.

== Dzheyrakhsky District ==
Settlement	Type	Co-ordinates	Notes
Armkhi	selo	42°48′43″N 44°42′27″E	
Beyni	selo	42°50′03″N 44°43′01″E	
Byalgan	aul		
Dzheyrakh	selo	42°49′19″N 44°40′47″E	Administrative center of Dzheyrakhsky District.
Furtoug	aul	42°50′40″N 44°39′10″E	
Gorbani	aul		
Oban selo	selo		
Pkhmat	aul		
Tamariani	aul		
Tyarsh	aul		

== Malgobeksky District ==
Settlement	Type	Co-ordinates	Notes
Aki-Yurt	selo	43°30′30″N 44°51′44″E	
Inarki	selo	43°28′15″N 44°32′48″E	
Nizhniye Achaluki	selo	43°24′04″N 44°45′38″E	
Novy Redant	selo	43°28′22″N 44°48′22″E	
Sagopshi	selo	43°29′05″N 44°35′17″E	
Sredniye Achaluki	selo	43°22′07″N 44°43′05″E	
Verkhniye Achaluki	selo	43°20′44″N 44°42′06″E	
Vezhary	selo	43°35′44″N 44°34′37″E	
Voznesenskaya	stanitsa	43°32′38″N 44°45′08″E	
Yuzhnoye	selo	43°31′03″N 44°45′00″E	
Zyazikov-Yurt	selo	43°29′01″N 44°46′21″E	

== Nazranovsky District ==
Settlement	Type	Co-ordinates	Notes
Ali-Yurt	selo	43°08′52″N 44°51′07″E	
Dolakovo	selo	43°14′21″N 44°36′02″E	
Kantyshevo	selo	43°13′41″N 44°38′54″E	

== Sunzhensky District ==
Settlement	Type	Co-ordinates	Notes
Galashki	selo	43°05′16″N 44°59′09″E	
Nesterovskaya	stanitsa	43°14′17″N 45°02′57″E	

== See also ==
- Lists of rural localities in Russia
