= Yuzhny, Russia =

Yuzhny (Russian: Ю́жный; masculine), Yuzhnaya (Ю́жная; feminine), or Yuzhnoye (Ю́жное; neuter) is the name of several inhabited localities in Russia.

== Modern inhabited localities ==
=== Altai Krai ===
As of 2010, two inhabited localities in Altai Krai bear this name.

Urban localities

- Yuzhny, Barnaul, Altai Krai, a work settlement under the administrative jurisdiction of Yuzhnaya Settlement Administration of the city of krai significance of Barnaul

Rural localities

- Yuzhny, Smolensky District, Altai Krai, a settlement in Novotyryshkinsky Selsoviet of Smolensky District

=== Amur Oblast ===
As of 2010, one rural locality in Amur Oblast bears this name:

- Yuzhny, Amur Oblast, a settlement in Paninsky Rural Settlement of Oktyabrsky District

=== Republic of Bashkortostan ===
As of 2010, two rural localities in the Republic of Bashkortostan bear this name:

- Yuzhny, Republic of Bashkortostan, a village in Oktyabrsky Selsoviet of Sterlitamaksky District
- Yuzhnaya, Republic of Bashkortostan, a village in Russko-Yurmashsky Selsoviet of Ufimsky District

=== Chelyabinsk Oblast ===
As of 2010, three inhabited localities in Chelyabinsk Oblast bear this name.

Urban localities

- Yuzhny, Nagaybaksky District, Chelyabinsk Oblast, a work settlement in Nagaybaksky District

Rural localities

- Yuzhny, Zlatoust, Chelyabinsk Oblast, a settlement under the administrative jurisdiction of the city of Zlatoust
- Yuzhny, Agapovsky District, Chelyabinsk Oblast, a settlement in Magnitny Selsoviet of Agapovsky District

=== Chukotka Autonomous Okrug ===
As of 2010, one urban locality in Chukotka Autonomous Okrug bears this name:

- Yuzhny, Chukotka Autonomous Okrug, an urban-type settlement in Chaunsky District

=== Republic of Dagestan ===
As of 2010, one rural locality in the Republic of Dagestan bears this name:

- Yuzhnoye, Republic of Dagestan, a selo in Yuzhny Selsoviet of Kizlyarsky District

=== Republic of Ingushetia ===
As of 2010, one rural locality in the Republic of Ingushetia bears this name:

- Yuzhnoye, Republic of Ingushetia, a selo in Malgobeksky District

=== Irkutsk Oblast ===
As of 2010, one rural locality in Irkutsk Oblast bears this name:

- Yuzhny, Irkutsk Oblast, a settlement in Bratsky District

=== Kaliningrad Oblast ===
As of 2010, one rural locality in Kaliningrad Oblast bears this name:

- Yuzhny, Kaliningrad Oblast, a settlement in Nivensky Rural Okrug of Bagrationovsky District

=== Republic of Kalmykia ===
As of 2010, two rural localities in the Republic of Kalmykia bear this name:

- Yuzhny, Gorodovikovsky District, Republic of Kalmykia, a settlement in Yuzhnenskaya Rural Administration of Gorodovikovsky District
- Yuzhny, Iki-Burulsky District, Republic of Kalmykia, a settlement in Chograyskaya Rural Administration of Iki-Burulsky District

=== Kemerovo Oblast ===
As of 2010, two rural localities in Kemerovo Oblast bear this name:

- Yuzhny, Leninsk-Kuznetsky District, Kemerovo Oblast, a settlement in Shabanovskaya Rural Territory of Leninsk-Kuznetsky District
- Yuzhny, Mezhdurechensky District, Kemerovo Oblast, a settlement in Bungurskaya Rural Territory of Mezhdurechensky District

=== Khabarovsk Krai ===
As of 2010, one rural locality in Khabarovsk Krai bears this name:

- Yuzhny, Khabarovsk Krai, a settlement in imeni Lazo District

=== Kirov Oblast ===
As of 2010, two rural localities in Kirov Oblast bear this name:

- Yuzhny, Kirov Oblast, a pochinok in Novosmailsky Rural Okrug of Malmyzhsky District
- Yuzhnaya, Kirov Oblast, a village in Yakhrengsky Rural Okrug of Podosinovsky District

=== Krasnodar Krai ===
As of 2010, twelve rural localities in Krasnodar Krai bear this name:

- Yuzhny, Armavir, Krasnodar Krai, a settlement in Prirechensky Rural Okrug of the City of Armavir
- Yuzhny, Belorechensk, Krasnodar Krai, a settlement in Yuzhny Rural Okrug of the Town of Belorechensk
- Yuzhny, Dinskoy District, Krasnodar Krai, a settlement in Yuzhno-Kubansky Rural Okrug of Dinskoy District
- Yuzhny, Korenovsky District, Krasnodar Krai, a settlement under the administrative jurisdiction of the Town of Korenovsk, Korenovsky District
- Yuzhny, Krymsky District, Krasnodar Krai, a settlement in Yuzhny Rural Okrug of Krymsky District
- Yuzhny, Kurganinsky District, Krasnodar Krai, a khutor in Mikhaylovsky Rural Okrug of Kurganinsky District
- Yuzhny, Novokubansky District, Krasnodar Krai, a settlement in Sovetsky Rural Okrug of Novokubansky District
- Yuzhny, Novopokrovsky District, Krasnodar Krai, a settlement in Kubansky Rural Okrug of Novopokrovsky District
- Yuzhny, Otradnensky District, Krasnodar Krai, a settlement in Blagodarnensky Rural Okrug of Otradnensky District
- Yuzhny, Pavlovsky District, Krasnodar Krai, a settlement in Srednechelbassky Rural Okrug of Pavlovsky District
- Yuzhny, Tikhoretsky District, Krasnodar Krai, a settlement in Bratsky Rural Okrug of Tikhoretsky District
- Yuzhny, Ust-Labinsky District, Krasnodar Krai, a settlement in Vimovsky Rural Okrug of Ust-Labinsky District

=== Kursk Oblast ===
As of 2010, two rural localities in Kursk Oblast bear this name:

- Yuzhny, Korenevsky District, Kursk Oblast, a settlement in Verkhnegrunsky Selsoviet of Korenevsky District
- Yuzhny, Sudzhansky District, Kursk Oblast, a khutor in Kazacheloknyansky Selsoviet of Sudzhansky District

=== Lipetsk Oblast ===
As of 2010, one rural locality in Lipetsk Oblast bears this name:

- Yuzhny, Lipetsk Oblast, a settlement in Verkhnechesnochensky Selsoviet of Volovsky District

=== Nizhny Novgorod Oblast ===
As of 2010, two rural localities in Nizhny Novgorod Oblast bear this name:

- Yuzhny, Tonshayevsky District, Nizhny Novgorod Oblast, a settlement in Kodochigovsky Selsoviet of Tonshayevsky District
- Yuzhny, Vorotynsky District, Nizhny Novgorod Oblast, a settlement in Chugunovsky Selsoviet of Vorotynsky District

=== Novosibirsk Oblast ===
As of 2010, one rural locality in Novosibirsk Oblast bears this name:

- Yuzhny, Novosibirsk Oblast, a settlement in Cherepanovsky District

=== Omsk Oblast ===
As of 2010, six rural localities in Omsk Oblast bear this name:

- Yuzhny, Isilkulsky District, Omsk Oblast, a settlement in Boyevoy Rural Okrug of Isilkulsky District
- Yuzhny, Lyubinsky District, Omsk Oblast, a settlement in Yuzhno-Lyubinsky Rural Okrug of Lyubinsky District
- Yuzhny, Ust-Ishimsky District, Omsk Oblast, a settlement in Ust-Ishimsky Rural Okrug of Ust-Ishimsky District
- Yuzhnoye, Azovsky Nemetsky natsionalny District, Omsk Oblast, a village in Azovsky Rural Okrug of Azovsky Nemetsky National District
- Yuzhnoye, Pavlogradsky District, Omsk Oblast, a selo in Yuzhny Rural Okrug of Pavlogradsky District
- Yuzhnoye, Sherbakulsky District, Omsk Oblast, a village in Borisovsky Rural Okrug of Sherbakulsky District

=== Orenburg Oblast ===
As of 2010, three rural localities in Orenburg Oblast bear this name:

- Yuzhny, Alexandrovsky District, Orenburg Oblast, a settlement in Tukayevsky Selsoviet of Alexandrovsky District
- Yuzhny, Krasnogvardeysky District, Orenburg Oblast, a settlement in Sverdlovsky Selsoviet of Krasnogvardeysky District
- Yuzhny, Perevolotsky District, Orenburg Oblast, a khutor in Sadovy Selsoviet of Perevolotsky District

=== Oryol Oblast ===
As of 2010, one rural locality in Oryol Oblast bears this name:

- Yuzhny, Oryol Oblast, a settlement in Pakhomovsky Selsoviet of Orlovsky District

=== Penza Oblast ===
As of 2010, one rural locality in Penza Oblast bears this name:

- Yuzhny, Penza Oblast, a settlement in Yulovsky Selsoviet of Gorodishchensky District

=== Perm Krai ===
As of 2010, two rural localities in Perm Krai bear this name:

- Yuzhny, Bolshesosnovsky District, Perm Krai, a settlement in Bolshesosnovsky District
- Yuzhny, Suksunsky District, Perm Krai, a settlement in Suksunsky District

=== Rostov Oblast ===
As of 2010, two rural localities in Rostov Oblast bear this name:

- Yuzhny, Azovsky District, Rostov Oblast, a settlement in Yelizavetovskoye Rural Settlement of Azovsky District
- Yuzhny, Martynovsky District, Rostov Oblast, a settlement in Yuzhnenskoye Rural Settlement of Martynovsky District

=== Ryazan Oblast ===
As of 2010, two rural localities in Ryazan Oblast bear this name:

- Yuzhny, Miloslavsky District, Ryazan Oblast, a settlement in Miloslavsky Rural Okrug of Miloslavsky District
- Yuzhny, Skopinsky District, Ryazan Oblast, a settlement under the administrative jurisdiction of the work settlement of Pavelets, Skopinsky District

=== Samara Oblast ===
As of 2010, one rural locality in Samara Oblast bears this name:

- Yuzhny, Samara Oblast, a settlement in Bolsheglushitsky District

=== Saratov Oblast ===
As of 2010, two rural localities in Saratov Oblast bear this name:

- Yuzhny, Samoylovsky District, Saratov Oblast, a settlement in Samoylovsky District
- Yuzhny, Yershovsky District, Saratov Oblast, a settlement in Yershovsky District

=== Smolensk Oblast ===
As of 2010, one rural locality in Smolensk Oblast bears this name:

- Yuzhnaya, Smolensk Oblast, a village in Kaydakovskoye Rural Settlement of Vyazemsky District

=== Stavropol Krai ===
As of 2010, one rural locality in Stavropol Krai bears this name:

- Yuzhny, Stavropol Krai, a settlement in Temizhbeksky Selsoviet of Novoalexandrovsky District

=== Sverdlovsk Oblast ===
As of 2010, one rural locality in Sverdlovsk Oblast bears this name:

- Yuzhny, Sverdlovsk Oblast, a settlement in Pyshminsky District

=== Tomsk Oblast ===
As of 2010, one rural locality in Tomsk Oblast bears this name:

- Yuzhny, Tomsk Oblast, a settlement in Tomsky District

=== Tula Oblast ===
As of 2013, four rural localities in Tula Oblast bear this name:

- Yuzhny, Chernsky District, Tula Oblast, a settlement in Yerzhinskaya Rural Administration of Chernsky District
- Yuzhny, Leninsky District, Tula Oblast, a settlement in Zaytsevsky Rural Okrug of Leninsky District
- Yuzhny, Plavsky District, Tula Oblast, a settlement in Novo-Zhukovsky Rural Okrug of Plavsky District
- Yuzhny, Uzlovsky District, Tula Oblast, a settlement in Fedorovsky Rural Okrug of Uzlovsky District

=== Tver Oblast ===
As of 2010, two rural localities in Tver Oblast bear this name:

- Yuzhny, Nelidovsky District, Tver Oblast, a settlement in Nelidovsky District
- Yuzhny, Ostashkovsky District, Tver Oblast, a settlement in Ostashkovsky District

=== Tyumen Oblast ===
As of 2010, one rural locality in Tyumen Oblast bears this name:

- Yuzhnoye, Tyumen Oblast, a village in Zinovsky Rural Okrug of Yalutorovsky District

=== Vladimir Oblast ===
As of 2010, one rural locality in Vladimir Oblast bears this name:

- Yuzhny, Vladimir Oblast, a settlement in Melenkovsky District

=== Vologda Oblast ===
As of 2010, one rural locality in Vologda Oblast bears this name:

- Yuzhny, Vologda Oblast, a settlement in Charozersky Selsoviet of Kirillovsky District

=== Voronezh Oblast ===
As of 2010, one rural locality in Voronezh Oblast bears this name:

- Yuzhny, Voronezh Oblast, a settlement in Medovskoye Rural Settlement of Bogucharsky District

=== Yaroslavl Oblast ===
As of 2010, one rural locality in Yaroslavl Oblast bears this name:

- Yuzhny, Yaroslavl Oblast, a settlement in Lyubilkovsky Rural Okrug of Rostovsky District

=== Zabaykalsky Krai ===
As of 2010, one rural locality in Zabaykalsky Krai bears this name:

- Yuzhnoye, Zabaykalsky Krai, a selo in Borzinsky District

== Abolished inhabited localities ==
- Yuzhny, Volgograd Oblast, a former urban-type settlement in Volgograd Oblast; merged into Volgograd in 2010
