= Sergey Bekov =

Soviet and Russian politician

- Сергей Мажитович Беков
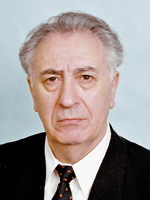

Chairman of the Council of Ministers of the Checheno-Ingush ASSR
- In office 1990 – 22 November 1991
- Preceded by: Musa Kerimov
- Succeeded by: Office abolished

Member of the Federation Council from the People's Assembly of the Republic of Ingushetia
- In office 20 March 2001 – 15 October 2002
- Succeeded by: Igor Kamenskoy

Member of the Federation Council from the executive authority of Agin-Buryat Autonomous Okrug
- In office 14 July 2006 – 15 December 2010
- Preceded by: Khamzat Gutseriev
- Succeeded by: Office abolished

Personal details
- Born: 27 November 1939 (age 86) Verkhniye Achaluki, Malgobeksky District, Checheno-Ingush ASSR, Russian SFSR, Soviet Union
- Party: CPSU (1961–1991)
- Education: Moscow Timiryazev Agricultural Academy
- Awards: Order of Friendship; Order of the Red Banner of Labour; Order of the Red Star; Order of the Badge of Honour

Sergey (Serazhetdin) Mazhitovich Bekov (Russian: Сергей (Серажетдин) Мажитович Беков; born 27 November 1939) is a Soviet and Russian state official, former party functionary and customs-service official. In the 1960s–1980s, he worked in agriculture and party structures in the Checheno-Ingush ASSR, and was twice sent as an adviser to Afghanistan during the Soviet–Afghan War. In 1990–1991, he served as chairman of the Council of Ministers of the Checheno-Ingush ASSR during the late-Soviet political crisis and the collapse of republican institutions.

After the dissolution of the Soviet Union, Bekov held senior positions in the State Customs Committee of the Russian Federation, including deputy chairman and state secretary–deputy chairman. He held the special rank of colonel general of the customs service. From 2001 to 2002, he represented the People's Assembly of the Republic of Ingushetia in the Federation Council, and from 2006 to 2010 he was a Federation Council member from the executive authority of Agin-Buryat Autonomous Okrug.

== Early life and education ==
Bekov was born on 27 November 1939 in the village of Verkhniye Achaluki, Malgobeksky District, in the Checheno-Ingush ASSR. He is Ingush by ethnicity.

After finishing secondary school, Bekov worked at the Mineralnye Vody plant from 1957 to 1958. In 1960, he worked as an inspector in the resettlement and organised recruitment department of the Council of Ministers of the Checheno-Ingush ASSR and as a physical-education teacher at a secondary school.

In 1960, Bekov entered the fruit-and-vegetable faculty of the Moscow Timiryazev Agricultural Academy. During his studies, he was secretary of the Komsomol organisation of his course, secretary of the academy's Komsomol committee, and a member of the Moscow City Committee of the Komsomol. In 1965, he graduated from the academy as an economist. In 1970, he completed full-time postgraduate study at the department of viticulture and winemaking of the same academy and defended a dissertation for the degree of Candidate of Agricultural Sciences. In 1979, he graduated from the Rostov Interregional Higher Party School.

== Agricultural and party career ==
After graduating from the Moscow Timiryazev Agricultural Academy, Bekov worked in agriculture in the Checheno-Ingush ASSR. From 1965, he was a brigade leader at the Nadterechny state farm. From 1966, he worked at the Grozny fruit-and-vegetable state farm, where he held the posts of department manager, chief agronomist and head of the second section. In 1970, he became chief agronomist of the S. M. Kirov wine state farm, and in 1971 he became director of the Kalinovsky wine state farm.

In May 1973, Bekov moved into party work and was elected first secretary of the Nazran district committee of the Communist Party of the Soviet Union. In late 1978, he was appointed head of the agricultural department of the Checheno-Ingush regional committee of the CPSU; later, food industry also came under his area of responsibility. In 1987, he was elected secretary of the Checheno-Ingush regional committee of the CPSU. In that position, according to the newspaper Ingushetia, he dealt not only with economic questions but also with ideological work, including nationalities policy.

During the Soviet–Afghan War, Bekov twice worked in the Democratic Republic of Afghanistan. From 1982 to 1984, he was an adviser of the CPSU Central Committee in Nangarhar Province, and from 1986 to 1988 he was an adviser in the "East" operational-military zone on the border with Pakistan. According to Ingushetia, he spent more than three years in Afghanistan in total.

== Chairman of the Council of Ministers of the Checheno-Ingush ASSR ==
In spring 1990, Bekov was appointed chairman of the Council of Ministers of the Checheno-Ingush ASSR.

As chairman of the Council of Ministers, Bekov worked on issues connected with the rehabilitation of repressed peoples and the restoration of Ingush statehood. According to Ingushetia, after the 28th Congress of the CPSU, he took part in drafting the RSFSR law "On the Rehabilitation of Repressed Peoples"; after the law was adopted, he was involved in preparations for the separation of the Checheno-Ingush ASSR and the creation of the Republic of Ingushetia. The RSFSR law "On the Rehabilitation of Repressed Peoples" was adopted on 26 April 1991 and provided, among other things, for the restoration of national-state formations of repressed peoples. On 4 June 1992, the Supreme Soviet of the Russian Federation adopted the law "On the Formation of the Ingush Republic within the Russian Federation". The law established the Ingush Republic and a transitional period for resolving related issues.

In September 1991, the previous republican organs of power in Checheno-Ingushetia collapsed. After a multi-day rally and the opposition's seizure of the television centre, the Radio House and the House of Political Education, the chairman of the Supreme Soviet of Checheno-Ingushetia, Doku Zavgayev, resigned, and de facto power passed to structures of the Chechen National Congress led by Dzhokhar Dudayev. In October, Bekov was removed from power by Dudayev. Formally, his term as chairman of the Council of Ministers ended on 22 November 1991.

== Customs service and RSPP ==
On 27 January 1992, Bekov was appointed deputy chairman of the State Customs Committee of the Russian Federation. In 1994, he was appointed chairman of the interdepartmental commission on the opening, construction and development of crossing points on the Russian-Chinese state border. On 16 November 1996, Bekov was included in the Government Commission for Countering the Abuse of Narcotic Drugs and Their Illicit Trafficking. In 1996, he also joined the interdepartmental commission for organising tenders and auctions for the sale of export and import quotas.

On 28 January 1997, Bekov was appointed state secretary–deputy chairman of the State Customs Committee. On 7 May 1997, he was relieved of that post in connection with a transfer to other work. In June 1997, he headed the representation of the State Customs Committee of Russia at the customs service of the Republic of Kazakhstan. In July 1998, he returned to Moscow and became head of the customs service organisation directorate of the State Customs Committee. Bekov received the special rank of colonel general of the customs service.

In 1999, Bekov became a vice-president of the Russian Union of Industrialists and Entrepreneurs, where he oversaw customs regulation, tax legislation, the "North Caucasus" association and the Black Sea Economic Cooperation area.

== Federation Council ==
In 1999, Bekov ran in the election to the 3rd State Duma on the federal list of the Fatherland – All Russia bloc, but was not elected.

From March 2001 to October 2002, Bekov was a member of the Federation Council from the Republic of Ingushetia, representing the region's legislative body. On 20 March 2001, he was approved by the Parliament of the Republic of Ingushetia as its representative in the Federation Council, and on 4 April 2001 his powers as a member of the Federation Council were confirmed. From April 2001 to January 2002, he was a member of the Federation Council Committee on Budget, Tax Policy, Financial, Currency and Customs Regulation and Banking. From January 2002, he was a member of the Budget Committee and the Commission on the Methodology of Implementing the Constitutional Powers of the Federation Council.

On 15 October 2002, the People's Assembly of the Republic of Ingushetia recalled Bekov from the Federation Council ahead of schedule, citing "insufficient interaction with representatives of Ingushetia's power structures"; his term had been due to expire in February 2003. Kommersant linked the decision to Bekov's political position in the 2002 Ingushetia presidential election: he had supported former president Ruslan Aushev, then candidate Khamzat Gutseriev, and, after Gutseriev was removed from the election, Alikhan Amirkhanov, who opposed the federal candidate Murat Zyazikov.

After leaving the Federation Council, Bekov worked as an adviser in the secretariat of Federation Council chairman Sergey Mironov.

On 14 July 2006, the Federation Council confirmed Bekov's powers as a member of the chamber from the executive authority of Agin-Buryat Autonomous Okrug. From July 2006 to April 2008, he was a member of the Federation Council Committee on Constitutional Legislation; from April 2008, he was deputy chairman of that committee. From July 2006 to February 2008, he was a member of the Federation Council Commission for Interaction with the Accounts Chamber of Russia, from February to May 2008 he was deputy chairman of that commission, and from May to October 2008 he was again a member of it. In addition, from July 2006 he was a member of the Federation Council Commission on Natural Monopolies, and from October 2008 he was a member of the Commission on Housing Policy and Housing and Utilities.

By Federation Council Resolution No. 555-SF of 15 December 2010, Bekov's powers were terminated.

== Family ==
Bekov is married and has two sons and a daughter.

His elder brother, Sultan Bekov, was a Guards captain and participant in the Great Patriotic War.

One of his sons is Magomed Bekov. On 24 September 2013, he was appointed first deputy chairman of the government of the Republic of Ingushetia. In May 2014, Magomed Bekov resigned as deputy chairman of the government. In 2014, Republic.ru wrote that in his mandatory income declaration Magomed Bekov had listed 179 land plots with a total area of 855,960 square metres, mainly in the Istra and Krasnogorsk districts of Moscow Oblast. The publication estimated the value of the plots at more than 2 billion rubles. Magomed Bekov said that most of the land had been acquired in 2005, when he owned Atlas, an investment company involved in building cottage settlements in the Istra district of Moscow Oblast.

Another son, Abukar Bekov, worked at Slavneft when the company was headed by Mikhail Gutseriev. According to Republic.ru, Abukar Bekov later became, together with Gutseriev, a co-owner of the Moscow filling-station chain Association Grand, which was acquired by Lukoil in 2008. After Magomed Bekov entered public service, Abukar Bekov became the owner of his brother's development business. In 2009, Kommersant and Interfax described Abukar Bekov as the new owner of the metallurgical assets of the Estar group.

== Personal and special ranks ==
- State Councillor of the Customs Service, 3rd rank (19 March 1992).
- State Councillor of the Customs Service, 1st rank (25 March 1993).
- Colonel general of the customs service.

== Awards and honours ==
- Certificate of gratitude of the President of Russia (1996).
- Certificate of Honour of the State Duma of the Federal Assembly of the Russian Federation (1995).
- Order of Friendship (17 December 1994), for services connected with the development of Russian statehood, achievements in labour, science, culture and art, and strengthening friendship and cooperation among peoples.
- Certificate of Honour of the Government of the Russian Federation (1994).
- Order of the Red Star (1990).
- Order of the Red Banner of Labour (1984).
- Order of the Badge of Honour (1981).
- Order of the Badge of Honour (1976).
- Medal "In Commemoration of the 850th Anniversary of Moscow".
- Medal "Veteran of Labour".
- Jubilee Medal "70 Years of the Armed Forces of the USSR".
- Order of the Red Banner (Afghanistan).
- Order of Friendship of Peoples of Afghanistan.
- Honoured Customs Officer of the Russian Federation.
- Certificate of Honour of the Federation Council.
