= Khamzat Gutseriev =

Russian politician and law enforcement official

- Хамзат Гуцериев
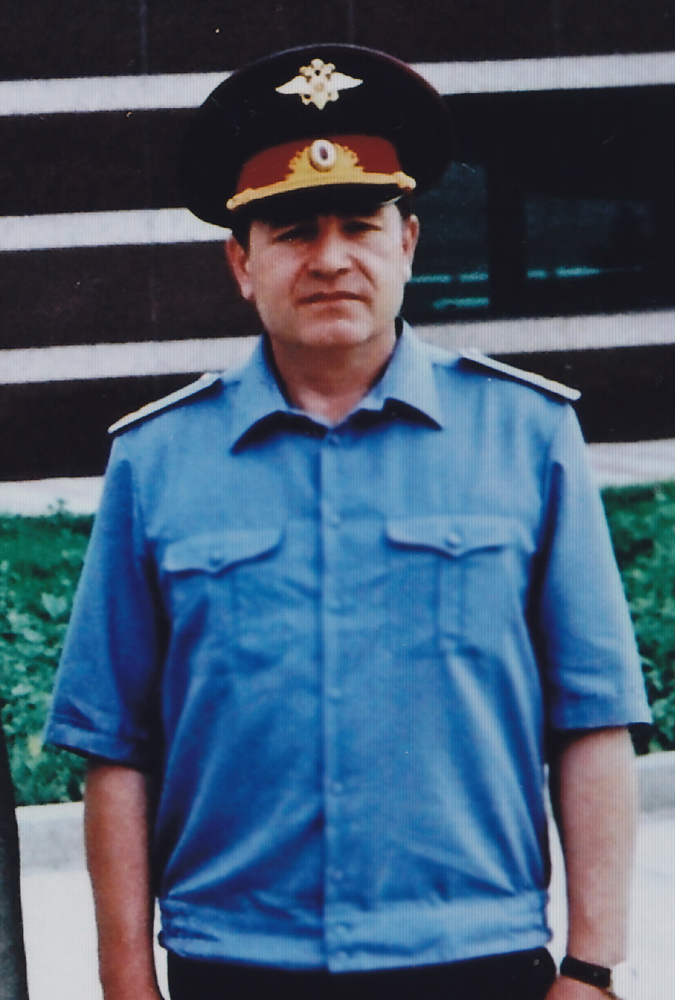

Member of the Federation Council from the Agin-Buryat Autonomous Okrug
- In office 4 March 2004 – 23 June 2006
- Preceded by: Vladimir Shoyzhilzhapov
- Succeeded by: Sergey Bekov

Personal details
- Born: 14 October 1954 (age 71) Akmolinsk, Kazakh SSR, Soviet Union (now Astana, Kazakhstan)
- Relatives: Mikhail Gutseriev (brother); Sait-Salam Gutseriev (brother); Mikail Shishkhanov (nephew); Said Gutseriev (nephew)
- Education: Grozny Oil Institute; Higher Correspondence Law School of the USSR Ministry of Internal Affairs; Academy of Management of the Ministry of Internal Affairs of Russia

Khamzat Safarbekovich Gutseriev (Russian: Хамзат Сафарбекович Гуцериев; born 14 October 1954) is a Russian former law enforcement official and politician. He held the rank of lieutenant general of militsiya, served as minister of internal affairs of the Republic of Ingushetia from 1999 to 2002, and was a member of the Federation Council from 2004 to 2006. He represented the administration of Agin-Buryat Autonomous Okrug in the upper house of the Federal Assembly of Russia.

He is the elder brother of businessmen Mikhail Gutseriev and Sait-Salam Gutseriev.

== Biography ==
Gutseriev was born on 14 October 1954 in Akmolinsk into an Ingush family deported to the Kazakh SSR. His father, Safarbek Gutseriev, worked as a senior investigator for especially important cases in the Akmolinsk regional directorate of the NKVD; he was arrested in 1948 and released six months after Joseph Stalin's death. His mother was Marem Yakubovna Akhilgova. His brothers include businessmen Mikhail Gutseriev and Sait-Salam Gutseriev.

In 1977, Gutseriev graduated from the Grozny Oil Institute. In 1991, he graduated from the Higher Correspondence Law School of the USSR Ministry of Internal Affairs, and in 1994 from the Academy of Management of the Ministry of Internal Affairs of Russia. In 1998, he received the degree of Doctor of Juridical Sciences and the academic title of professor.

From 1971 to 1972, Gutseriev worked at the Chechen-Ingush republican office of Soyuzplodkultura. After graduating from the institute, he worked as a foreman and construction supervisor in a Grozny construction department. From 1981, he served in internal affairs agencies: he was an inspector, then deputy head and head of the criminal investigation department of the Oktyabrsky District internal affairs department in Grozny. From 1990, he headed the internal affairs department of the Nazran executive committee of the Chechen-Ingush ASSR, and from 1994 he served as first deputy minister of internal affairs and head of the criminal police service of the Ministry of Internal Affairs of the Republic of Ingushetia.

From 1995, Gutseriev worked at the Saint Petersburg University of the Ministry of Internal Affairs of Russia, where he was an associate professor in the department of theory and history of state and law. From 1998 to 1999, he served as vice president of that university.

In 1999, he served as chief inspector of the inspection section of the Main Organizational and Inspection Directorate of the Ministry of Internal Affairs of Russia, and was later appointed minister of internal affairs of the Republic of Ingushetia.

In March 2003, Gutseriev became vice-president of AKB BIN in Moscow.

On 4 March 2004, his mandate as a member of the Federation Council from the administration of Agin-Buryat Autonomous Okrug was confirmed. In the upper house, he served on the Committee on Economic Policy, Entrepreneurship and Property. His mandate was terminated early from 23 June 2006.

After leaving the Federation Council, Gutseriev worked in structures connected with the company Mospromstroy. In 2011, Kommersant wrote that in 2008 he had replaced Mikhail Gutseriev on the company's board of directors and that by 2011 he was deputy general director of Mospromstroy. In 2014, Forbes described him as a member of the board of directors and first deputy general director of Mospromstroy. In the same article, Forbes wrote that Gutseriev formally owned a stake of almost 10% in the commercial bank Russko-Ingushsky. On 24 February 2014, the Bank of Russia revoked the bank's licence to conduct banking operations, citing repeated violations of anti-money-laundering and counter-terrorist-financing legislation. In Mospromstroy's 2016 annual report, Gutseriev was listed as chairman of the board of directors.

Gutseriev is the author of more than 100 academic publications, including five monographs.

== 2002 Ingushetia presidential election ==
In 2002, Gutseriev ran in the presidential election in the Republic of Ingushetia. Kommersant and Radio Svoboda described him as one of the main contenders for the post of head of the republic. His candidacy was supported by former Ingush president Ruslan Aushev. According to Meduza, Gutseriev's campaign was financed by his brother Mikhail, who at the time was president of the state-owned company Slavneft.

Meduza, citing sources in the former leadership of the Russian presidential administration, wrote that despite Khamzat Gutseriev's publicly declared loyalty to Moscow, the Kremlin backed the less popular candidacy of Murat Zyazikov, who was being promoted by FSB director Nikolai Patrushev. According to the publication's sources, Kremlin representatives, including Vladislav Surkov, discussed the situation several times with Mikhail Gutseriev, but he said that he could not influence his elder brother.

On 5 April 2002, the Supreme Court of Russia annulled Gutseriev's registration as a candidate, granting a lawsuit filed by journalist Alikhan Guliyev. The court stated that after registering as a candidate Gutseriev had not taken election leave, and that he had left the post of interior minister of Ingushetia only on 7 March 2002. The ruling took immediate effect, although it could be appealed in cassation before the Supreme Court. Gutseriev called the court decision part of a "dirty and unceremonious" campaign conducted by presidential envoy to the Southern Federal District Viktor Kazantsev in support of Murat Zyazikov.

After Gutseriev was removed from the election, no candidate received the 50% needed to win in the first round, held on 7 April 2002. The second round was contested by the first-round leader, State Duma deputy Alikhan Amirkhanov, who had received 33% and was supported by Aushev and Gutseriev, and FSB general Murat Zyazikov, who had received 19%. Kommersant reported complaints by observers and voters about violations during the second-round vote. Zyazikov, who was supported by the federal authorities, won with 53% of the vote. In May 2002, Kommersant-Vlast described Gutseriev's removal from the election as one example of the judicial elimination of strong candidates in regional campaigns.

== Awards and honours ==
Gutseriev was awarded the Order of Courage and a Certificate of Honour of the Federation Council. He holds the titles of Honoured Worker of the Ministry of Internal Affairs of Russia and Honoured Worker of Physical Culture and Sport of Agin-Buryat Autonomous Okrug.
