= Nizhniye Achaluki =

Nizhniye Achaluki Нижние Ачалуки
- Village
- Location within Republic of Ingushetia Location within Russia
- Coordinates: 43°00′N 44°00′E
- Country: Russia
- Region: Republic of Ingushetia
- District: Malgobeksky District
- Time zone: UTC+3:00

Nizhniye Achaluki (Russian: Нижние Ачалуки) is a rural locality (a selo) in Malgobeksky District, Republic of Ingushetia, Russia. Population:4,985 (2021 census);

== Geography ==
This rural locality is located 18 kilometres (11 mi) from Malgobek (the district's administrative centre), 27 kilometres (17 mi) from Magas (capital of Republic of Ingushetia) and 1,490 kilometres (930 mi) from Moscow. Sredniye Achaluki is the nearest rural locality.
