= Voznesenskaya, Republic of Ingushetia =

Voznesenskaya Вознесенская
- Village
- Location within Republic of Ingushetia Location within Russia
- Coordinates: 43°32′N 44°45′E
- Country: Russia
- Region: Republic of Ingushetia
- District: Malgobeksky District
- Time zone: UTC+3:00

Voznesenskaya (Russian: Вознесенская) is a rural locality (a stanitsa) in Malgobeksky District, Republic of Ingushetia, Russia. Population:759 (2021 census);

== Geography ==
This rural locality is located 13 kilometres (8.1 mi) from Malgobek (the district's administrative centre), 42 kilometres (26 mi) from Magas (capital of Republic of Ingushetia) and 1,474 kilometres (916 mi) from Moscow. Krasnaya Gorka is the nearest rural locality.
