= Aki-Yurt =

Aki-Yurt Аки-Юрт
- Village
- Location within Republic of Ingushetia Location within Russia
- Coordinates: 43°30′N 44°51′E
- Country: Russia
- Region: Republic of Ingushetia
- District: Malgobeksky District
- Time zone: UTC+3:00

Aki-Yurt (Russian: Аки-Юрт) is a rural locality (a selo) in Malgobeksky District, Republic of Ingushetia, Russia. Population:1,544 (2021 census);

== Geography ==
This rural locality is located 22 kilometres (14 mi) from Malgobek (the district's administrative centre), 38 kilometres (24 mi) from Magas (capital of Republic of Ingushetia) and 1,482 kilometres (921 mi) from Moscow. Novy Redant is the nearest rural locality.
