= Vezhary =

Vezhary Вежарий
- Village
- Location within Republic of Ingushetia Location within Russia
- Coordinates: 43°35′N 44°34′E
- Country: Russia
- Region: Republic of Ingushetia
- District: Malgobeksky District
- Time zone: UTC+3:00

Vezhary (Russian: Вежарий) is a rural locality (a selo) in Malgobeksky District, Republic of Ingushetia, Russia. Population:722 (2021 census);

== Geography ==
This rural locality is located 10 kilometres (6.2 mi) from Malgobek (the district's administrative centre), 51 kilometres (32 mi) from Magas (capital of Republic of Ingushetia) and 1,464 kilometres (910 mi) from Moscow. Stary Malgobek is the nearest rural locality.
