= Inarki =

Inarki Инарки
- Village
- Location within Republic of Ingushetia Location within Russia
- Coordinates: 43°28′N 44°32′E
- Country: Russia
- Region: Republic of Ingushetia
- District: Malgobeksky District
- Time zone: UTC+3:00

Inarki (Russian: Инарки) is a rural locality (a selo) in Malgobeksky District, Republic of Ingushetia, Russia. Population:7,383 (2021 census);

== Geography ==
This rural locality is located 6 kilometres (3.7 mi) from Malgobek (the district's administrative centre), 40 kilometres (25 mi) from Magas (capital of Republic of Ingushetia) and 1,476 kilometres (917 mi) from Moscow. Psedakh is the nearest rural locality.
