= Sredniye Achaluki =

Sredniye Achaluki Средние Ачалуки
- Village
- Location within Republic of Ingushetia Location within Russia
- Coordinates: 43°22′N 44°43′E
- Country: Russia
- Region: Republic of Ingushetia
- District: Malgobeksky District
- Time zone: UTC+3:00

Sredniye Achaluki (Russian: Средние Ачалуки) is a rural locality (a selo) in Malgobeksky District, Republic of Ingushetia, Russia. Population:4,840 (2021 census);

== Geography ==
This rural locality is located 19 kilometres (12 mi) from Malgobek (the district's administrative centre), 23 kilometres (14 mi) from Magas (capital of Republic of Ingushetia) and 1,493 kilometres (928 mi) from Moscow. Verkhniye Achaluki is the nearest rural locality.
