= B&N Bank =

Russian commercial bank

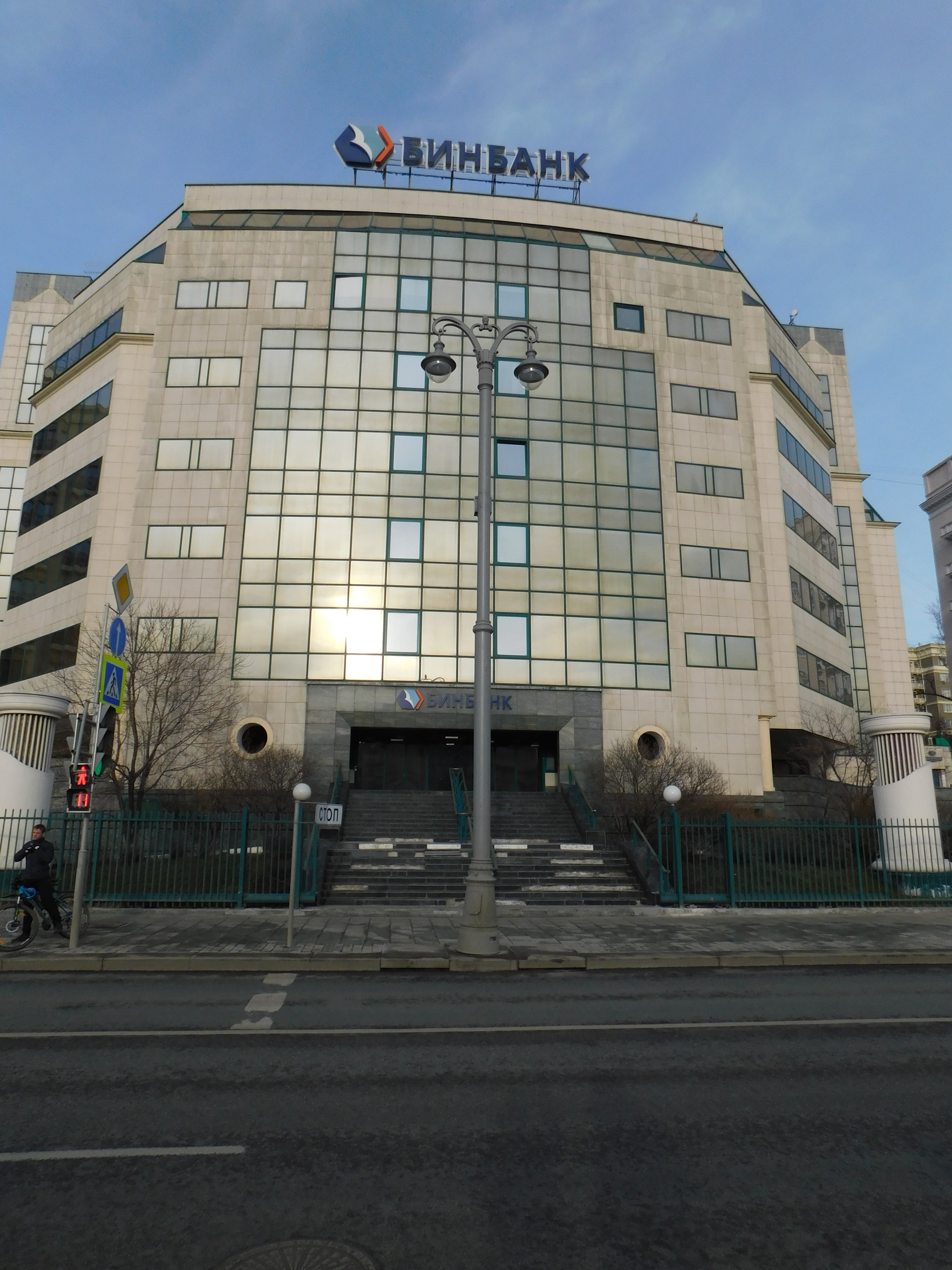
- Native name: Бинбанк
- Company type: Public joint-stock company
- Industry: Banking
- Founded: 1993
- Headquarters: Moscow, Russia
- Key people: Mikail Shishkhanov, Chairman of the Board of Directors
- Products: Retail banking
- Services: Financial services
- Net income: ▲RUB 1.899 million (January 2015)
- Total assets: ▲RUB 413.254 million (January 2015)
- Number of employees: 4,000
- Rating: B (S&P) (2017)
- Website: bin-bank.com

B&N Bank (Russian: ПАО «БИНБАНК») was one of the largest commercial banks in Russia. It was founded in 1993. In 2017, B&N Bank was nationalized by the Central Bank of Russia, and in 2018 it was decided to merge it with another private bank that became state-owned, Otkritie Financial Corporation.

== History ==
Founded in 1993 by Russian businessman Mikhail Gutseriev, B&N Bank had the general license of the Bank of Russia No. 2562. In 1995, when Mikhail Gutseriev was elected to the State Duma of the Russian Federation, he sold the shares of Binbank. Mikail Shishkhanov became the new owner of the bank. Shishkhanov himself headed the bank for a long time and until 2017 was its controlling shareholder.

B&N Bank was a medium-sized player in the Russian banking market until the mid-2000s, when the bank's strategy changed and it began to buy other credit institutions, significantly increasing the balance sheet through mergers and acquisitions. In November 2008, B&N Bank bought shares of Bashinvestbank, and in December 2013 Bashinvestbank was integrated with B&N Bank as its branch in Ufa.

In April 2014 B&N Bank became the owner of Moscomprivatbank, a former subsidiary of Ukrainian PrivatBank. The deal was the part of B&N Bank's strategy for retail business expansion. The acquisition has been approved by the Bank of Russia. In July 2014, B&N Bank successfully closed the acquisition of DNB Russia, a fully owned subsidiary of DNB Bank ASA ("DNB"), the leading Norwegian financial group. The company owned by Mikail Shishkhanov has become the owner of JSC Commercial Bank DNB Bank ("DNB Russia") located in Murmansk.

In December 2014 B&N Bank closed the deal of the acquisition of five banks of the Rost Group. The purpose of acquisition of the Rost Group banks was to expand the retail business, regional presence and client base of B&N Bank. In January 2015, B&N Bank acquired Uralprivatbank. In June 2015 B&N Bank entered into an agreement to acquire a controlling shareholding (58.33%) in MDM Bank. In 2016 B&N Bank completed its merger with MDM bank, placing it in the top ten of all Russian lenders.

In September 2017, B&N Bank announced it had asked for a rescue package after running into financial difficulties that saw it require emergency liquidity. Russia’s central bank said later that month it will nationalise B&N Bank and will take a majority equity stake in B&N and Rost Bank.

In 2018 B&N Bank has been merged with Otkritie Financial Corporation Bank. On March 15, an interbank loan provided by Binbank to Rost Bank was repaid with the subsequent dissolution of provisions for this loan. After additional capitalization by the Bank of Russia and the dissolution of reserves for Rost Bank, the capital of Binbank exceeded 100 billion rubles, as a result of which the bank again began to comply with capital adequacy standards and other prudential standards of activity.
