= Novy Redant =

Rural locality in Malgobeksky District of the Republic of Ingushetia, Russia

Novy Redant Новый Редант
- Selo

Other transcription(s)
  - Ingush: Керда Редант
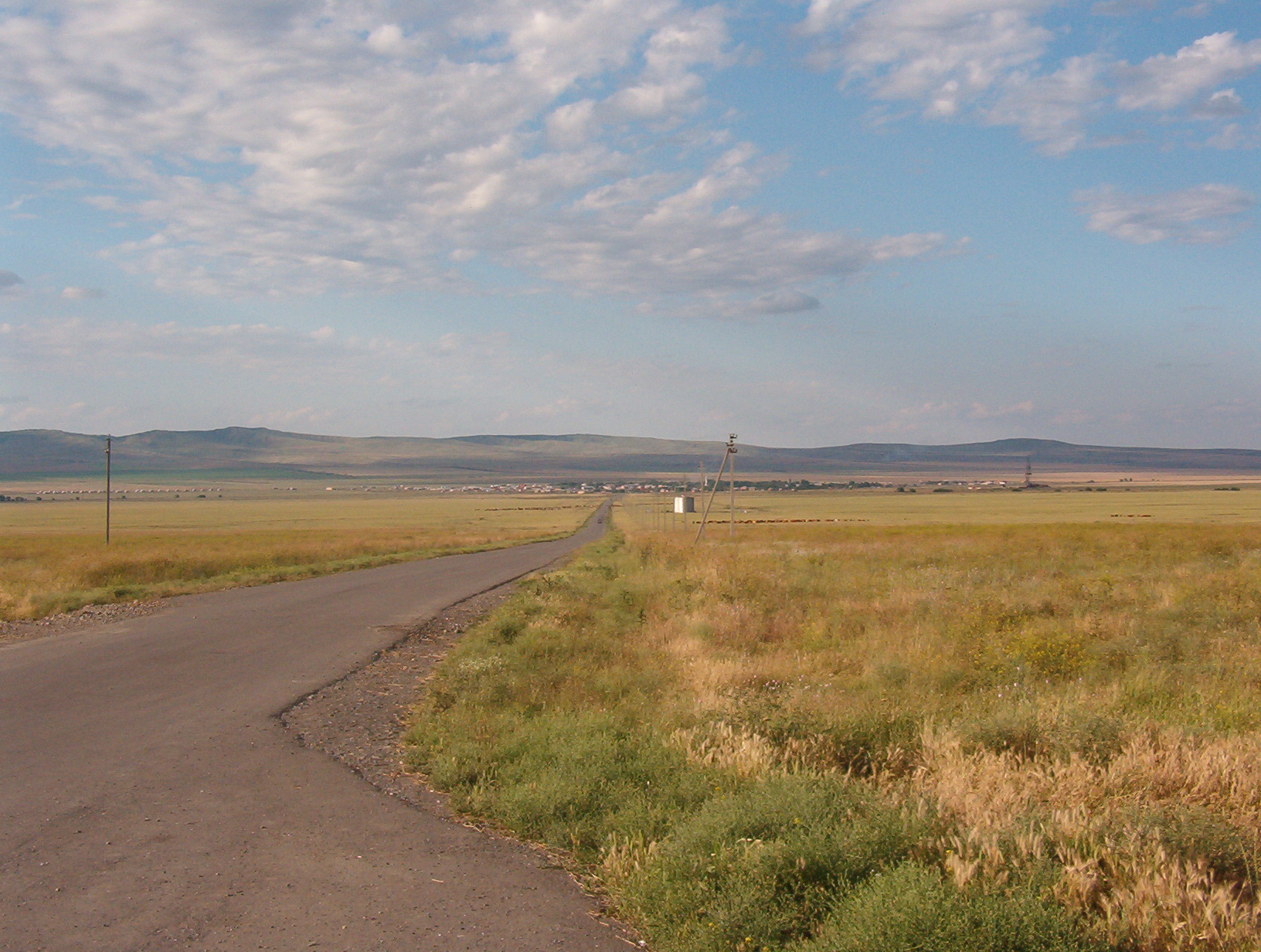
- Interactive map of Novy Redant
- Location of Novy Redant
- Coordinates: 43°28′15″N 44°48′05″E
- Country: Russia
- Federal subject: Ingushetia
- Founded: 1960
- Elevation: 317 m (1,040 ft)

Population
  - Estimate (2021): 6,281 )
- Time zone: UTC+3 (MSK)
- Postal code: 386339
- OKTMO ID: 26615440101

Novy Redant (Russian: Новый Редант, Ingush: Керда Редант, Kerda Redant) is a rural locality (a selo) in Malgobeksky District of the Republic of Ingushetia, Russia. Population: 3,689 (2010 census); 4,523 (2002 census).

== History ==
The history of Novy Redant can be traced back to the time after the 1944 deportation of Chechens and Ingush and the abolishment of the Chechen-Ingush Autonomous Soviet Socialist Republic. At that time, the site of the current village was formed into the Ossetia feed farm, which was later renamed as the Alkhanchurtsky feed farm and was a part of the North Ossetian Autonomous Soviet Socialist Republic.

In 1959, the village of Alkhanchurtsky state farm was officially renamed to Novy Redant by a decree of the Presidium of the Supreme Soviet of the RSFSR.

== Geography ==
Novy Redant is situated in the Alkhanchurt valley, located 16 km to the southeast of the city of Malgobek and 48 km to the north of the city of Magas. Some of the nearby settlements include the village of Aki-Yurt to the northeast, the village of Zyazikov-Yurt to the northwest, the village of Yuzhnoye and the village of Voznesenskaya, located on the highway P-296 Mozdok-Chermen-Vladikavkaz, and the village of Lower Achaluki to the southwest.
