= Zyazikov-Yurt =

Zyazikov-Yurt Зязиков
- Village
- Location within Republic of Ingushetia Location within Russia
- Coordinates: 43°29′N 44°46′E
- Country: Russia
- Region: Republic of Ingushetia
- District: Malgobeksky District
- Time zone: UTC+3:00

Zyazikov-Yurt (Russian: Зязиков) is a rural locality (a selo) in Malgobeksky District, Republic of Ingushetia, Russia. Population:4,653 (2021 census);
