= Dzheyrakh rural settlement =

Coordinates: 42°49′23.2″N 44°40′33.3″E

Dzheyrakh rural settlement is a municipal entity, one of the five rural settlements in Dzheyrakhsky District in the Republic of Ingushetia, Russia.

The administrative center is rural locality (selo) Dzheyrakh.

== Population ==
Dzheyrakh rural settlement population
- 2012: 1812
- 2013: 1715
- 2014: 1861
- 2015: 1911
- 2016: 1939

== Administrative structure ==
Number	Rural locality	Type of rural locality	Population (2016)
1	Armkhi	selo	158
2	Gorbani	selo	
3	Dzheyrakh	selo, administrative center	1781
4	Pkhmat	selo	
5	Tamariani	selo	
6	Furtoug	selo	
