= Yuzhnoye, Republic of Ingushetia =

Yuzhnoye Южное
- Village
- Location within Republic of Ingushetia Location within Russia
- Coordinates: 43°31′N 44°45′E
- Country: Russia
- Region: Republic of Ingushetia
- District: Malgobeksky District
- Time zone: UTC+3:00

Yuzhnoye (Russian: Южное) is a rural locality (a selo) in Malgobeksky District, Republic of Ingushetia, Russia. Population:1,089 (2021 census);

== Geography ==
This rural locality is located 13 kilometres (8.1 mi) from Malgobek (the district's administrative centre), 39 kilometres (24 mi) from Magas (capital of Republic of Ingushetia) and 1,477 kilometres (918 mi) from Moscow. Voznesenskaya is the nearest rural locality.
