= Yaroslavl refinery =

Oil refinery in Yaroslavl, Russia

Yaroslavl Refinery
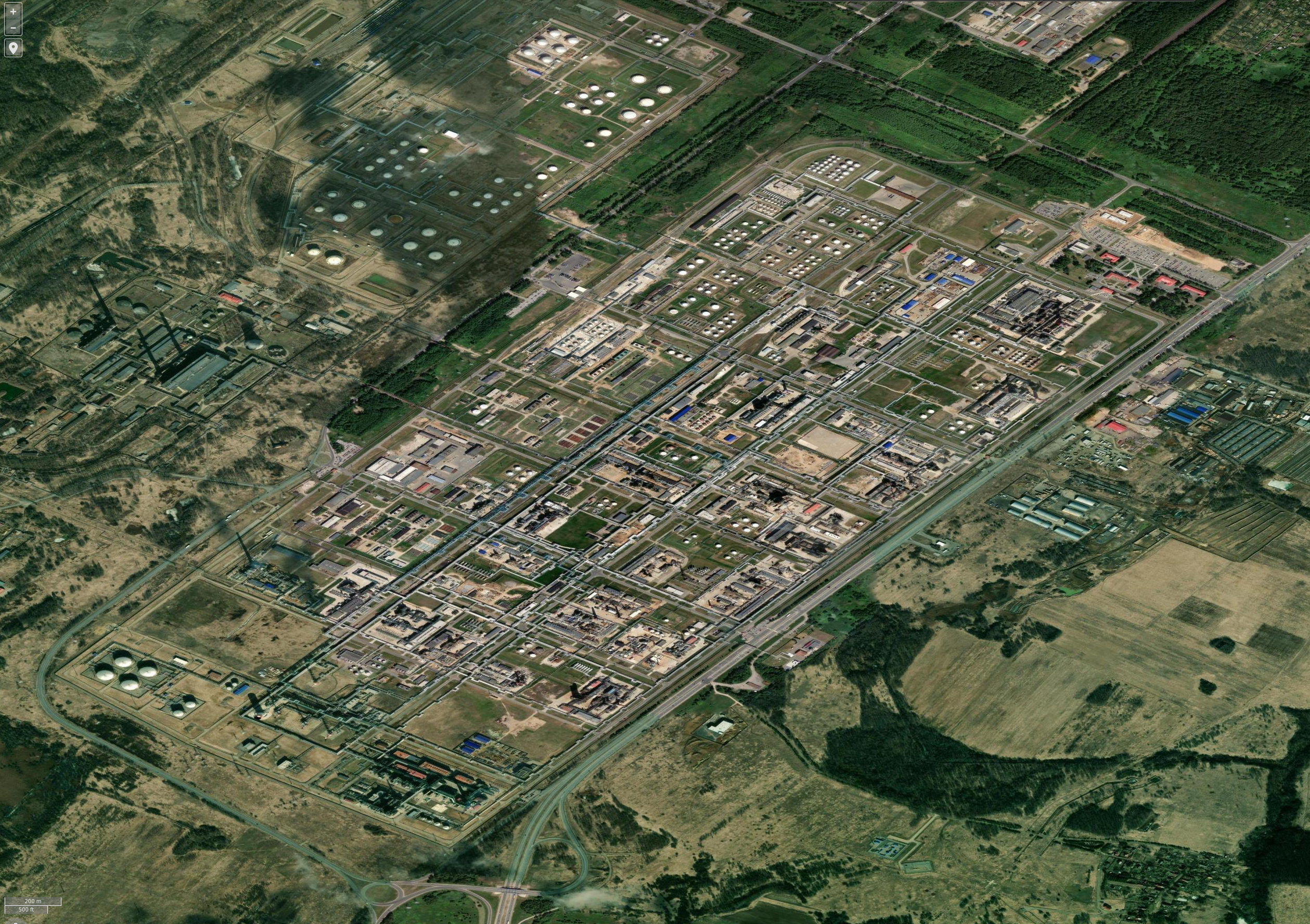
- Satellite imagery of Yaroslavl refinery

- Location within Yaroslavl Oblast Location within European Russia
- Interactive map of Yaroslavl Refinery
- Location: Yaroslavl, Russia; 57°32′45″N 39°47′22″E

Refinery details
- Operator: Slavneft
- Opened: 1961
- No. of employees: ~2,400
- Website: nnos.lukoil.ru

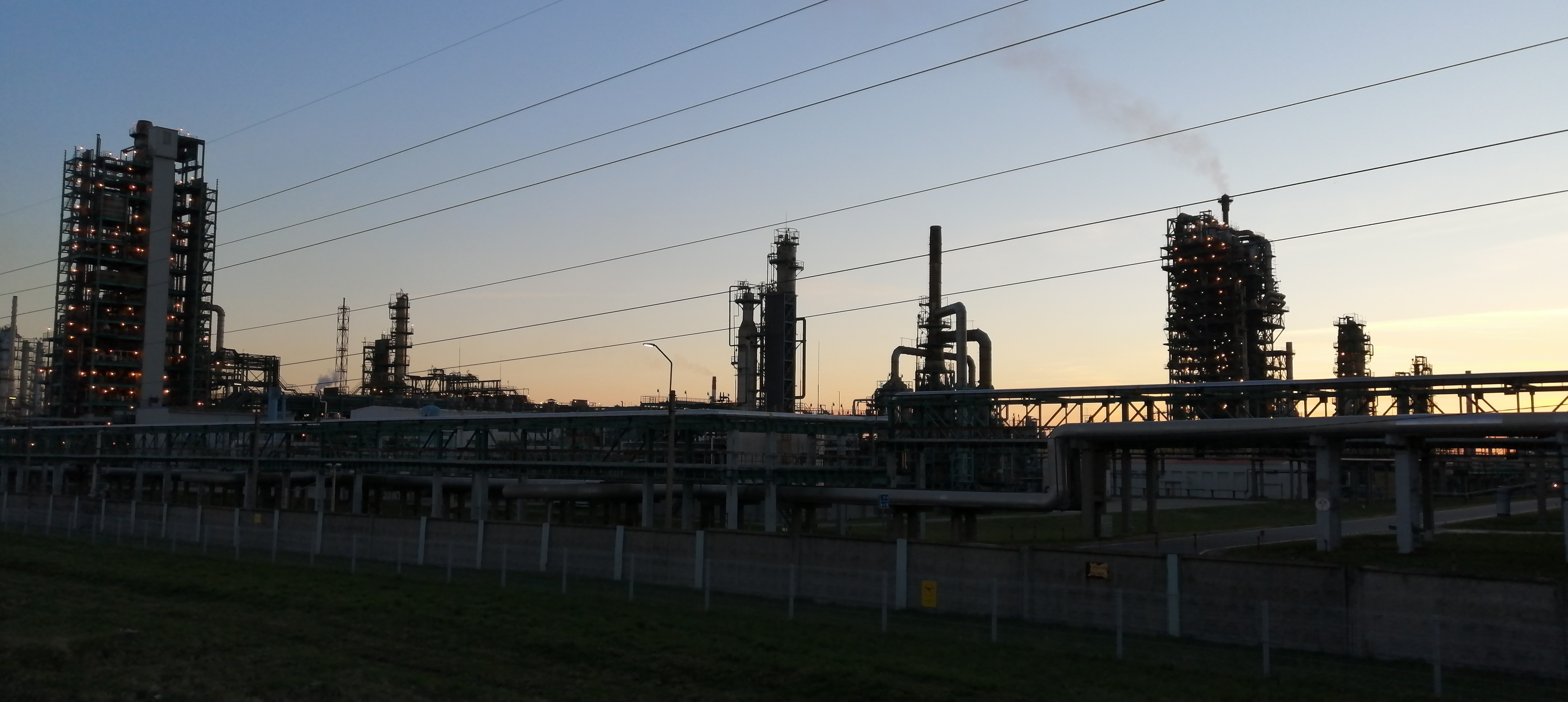
Yaroslavl refinery in 2021

The Yaroslavl Refinery (Russian: Ярославнефтеоргсинтез - Yaroslavnefteorgsintez (YANOS)) is an oil refinery plant in the Russian city of Yaroslavl and is one of the largest in the country. This refinery has belonged to the Russian company Slavneft since 2001.

== History ==
In 1952, the Soviet Ministry of Oil Industry selected the city of Yaroslavl as the site for a new oil refinery plant. The plant began operations in 1961 and expanded throughout the 1960s and 1970s.

In 1993, the refinery plant was privatized with the approval from Russian authorities, and it soon became part of Slavneft.

Throughout the 2000s, the company modernized much of the refinery plant, including the catalytic cracking units, to boost production. These investments cost around $1.5 billion.

In 2009, the company was estimated to be worth 12.9 billion rubles ($400 million USD).

According to the company's website, the main competitors for the refinery as of 2013 were: Ryazan Refinery, Kstovo Refinery, and Moscow Refinery.

On 1 October 2025, it was reported that a fire had broken out at the refinery.

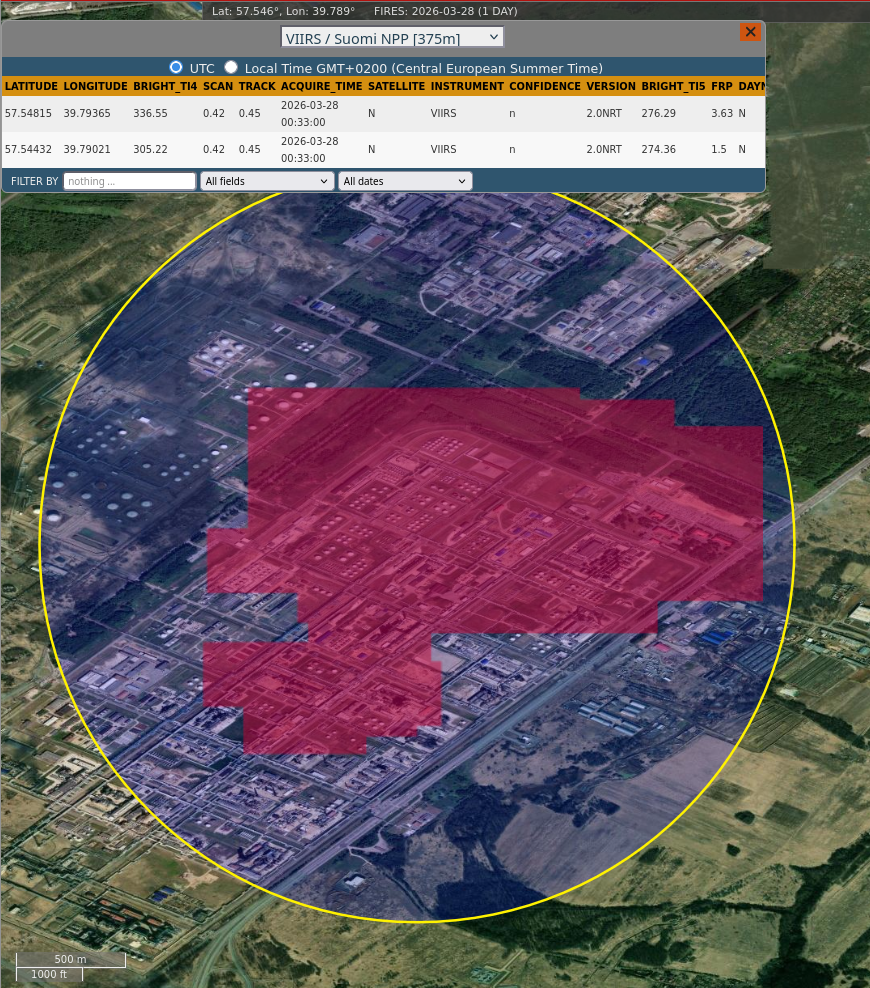
NASA's FIRMS detected extensive fire on 28 March 2026 00:33 (UTC) at Yaroslavl refinery

On 28 March 2026, during the Russo-Ukrainian War, Ukrainian drones caused a fire at the refinery.

== See also ==
- List of oil refineries
- Petroleum industry in Russia
