= Verkhniye Achaluki =

Verkhniye Achaluki Верхние Ачалуки
- Village
- Location within Republic of Ingushetia Location within Russia
- Coordinates: 43°20′N 44°42′E
- Country: Russia
- Region: Republic of Ingushetia
- District: Malgobeksky District
- Time zone: UTC+3:00

Verkhniye Achaluki (Russian: Верхние Ачалуки) is a rural locality (a selo) in Malgobeksky District, Republic of Ingushetia, Russia. Population:8,506 (2021 census);

== Geography ==
This rural locality is located 20 kilometres (12 mi) from Malgobek (the district's administrative centre), 22 kilometres (14 mi) from Magas (capital of Republic of Ingushetia) and 1,494 kilometres (928 mi) from Moscow. Sredniye Achaluki is the nearest rural locality.
