= Russneft =

Russian oil company

- Type: Public joint stock company
- Traded as: MCX: RNFT
- Industry: refining
- Founded: 2002
- Founder: Mikhail Gutseriyev
- Headquarters: Moscow, Russia
- Key people: Mikhail Gutseriyev (major shareholder; Evgeny Tolochek (CEO)
- Revenue: $3.66 billion (2021)
- Operating income: $787 million (2021)
- Net income: $444 million (2021)
- Total assets: $3.9 billion (2021)
- Total equity: $1.05 billion (2021)
- Number of employees: 10,000 (2020)
- Website: http://www.russneft.ru/eng/

Russneft (Russian: Русснефть) is a Russian oil company headquartered in Moscow which was established by Mikhail Gutseriev in 2002. It is a member of the SAFMAR industrial and financial group.

== Background ==
Russneft was founded in September 2002 by Mikhail Gutseriev, a Russian businessperson and philanthropist, with support from the Swiss company Glencore. It included early oil-production operations in West Siberia, Ulyanovsk, the Saratov and Penza regions, Udmurtia, and the Komi Republic. Russneft purchased oil processing and distribution plants in Orenburg Oblast and Krasnodar Krai regions in 2006, becoming a vertically-integrated oil holding company. It is one of Russia's top ten vertically-integrated oil companies, producing 10 million tons and processing nine million tons.

Some of Russneft's assets were transferred to the oil-processing holding companies Forteinvest and NK Neftisa, both owned by Gutseriev. The Khanty-Mansi oil company and the Nazymskaya oil and gas exploration expedition, both in West Siberia, merged with Russneft in December 2014.

== Investigations ==
In November 2006, the Investigative Committee of the Russian Federation initiated a criminal proceeding related to operations of three RussNeft subsidiaries: Nafta-Ulyanovsk, Ulyanovskneft and Aganneftegazgeologiya. According to the investigation, in 2003-2004 Aganneftegazgeologiya exceeded its permitted output in developing the oilfields at Zapadno-Mogutlorskoye and Roslavlskoye and received ₽5 billion in excess profit. Similar violations were discovered by the General Prosecutor's Office during investigations of Nafta-Ulyanovsk and Ulyanovskneft; managers of the companies exceeded quotas allowed by the subsoil licenses. The income of Nafta-Ulyanovsk from the sale of illegally-produced oil amounted to about ₽700 million, and the income of Ulyanovskneft reached ₽2 billion.

In late January 2007, authorities began investigating the company for tax evasion. On February 12, 2007, Gutseriev was charged with violating Part 2, Article 199 of the Criminal Code of the Russian Federation. The Federal Tax Service submitted eight claims to Russneft's former and current shareholders in April 2007. The tax authorities believed that stock in the company was sold at a low price to evade taxes. In June 2007, Tax Inspection No. 1 made a claim on RusNeft for ₽17.1 billion (₽14.5 billion in taxes and surcharges and ₽2.6 billion in penalties).

Gutseriev reported in late July that he was being pressured by the Russian government and would sell the company to Bazoviy Element, a holding company owned by Kremlin loyalist Oleg Deripaska. He resigned as president, saying that he would end his business activity and go into research. On July 31, the Lefortovo Court seized all RussNeft shares.

On November 9, 2007, the Arbitration Court of Appeal upheld the order of the Arbitration Court of Moscow fining Russneft about ₽17 billion for the second half of 2004 and all of 2005. After the decision, tax authorities would begin charging arrears.

In January 2010, Gutseriev regained control of the oil company. By mid-April, all charges against him were dropped.

On May 4, 2017, Gutseriev was charged with illegal business activity in violation of paragraphs a and b of part 2, Article 171 of the Criminal Code of the Russian Federation. His travel was restricted before trial.

Political considerations also influenced the investigations. A source close to the government of Ingushetia said that Gutseriev angered security services by preventing the development of Russneft in Ingushetia, but Kommersant downplayed that. According to Russneft, Gutseriev clashed with a high-ranking Kremlin official. It was less related to the oil business, but more to the political initiatives of M.Gutseriev. RBK Daily reported that Russneft had purchased assets from YUKOS which were not approved by the Kremlin, but refused to purchase Transpetrol (a Slovak pipeline company of strategic significance to Russia).

A number of experts said that one reason for pressure on Gutseriev was his refusal to sell Russneft to a state company for US$1 billion in 2006. Another reason was connected to his financing of opposition to Ingush president Murat Zyazikov.

== Ownership and management ==
Gutseriev and his partners were the founders and initial owners of Russneft. Control of the company was assumed in March 2009 by Bazoviy Element, the holding company owned by Oleg Deripaska. Glencore also had an option to purchase a stake in Russneft.

In January 2010, Gutseriev regained control of the company. In April of that year, it was announced that he would selling 49 percent of Russneft to AFK Sistema; two percent of the company's shares were sold to Sberbank. In July 2013, AFK Sistema sold 25 percednt of its shares to Bradinor Holdings Limited; twenty-four percent were purchased by Cromeld Management Limited. Both companies served Gutseriev family members.

Gutseriev owned 60 percent of Russneft's common stock, and Glencore owned 25 percent. Gutseriev has been chairman of the board since February 2015.

He sold his stake (37.15 percent) in August 2021 to Vemonar Holdings (a Cypriot company owned by his brother, Sait-Salam Gutseriev). According to Russneft, the deal was made on June 10, before June 21 EU sanctions and August UK sanctions on Gutseriev (due to his connections with Belarus president Alexander Lukashenko) were imposed.

== 2016 IPO ==
On November 25, 2016, Belyrian Holdings Limited (owned by Gutseriev) began trading 20 percent of the common stock on the Moscow Exchange (15 percent of the authorised capital) at ₽550 per share. Russneft, valued at ₽161.8 billion, raised ₽32.4 billion in the initial public offering.

== Production ==
West Siberia group:

- ОАО Mokhtikneft
- ОАО Varioganneft
- ОАО MPK Aganneftegazgeologiya
- ООО Beliye Nochi
- ЗАО Chernogorskoye
- ОАО NAK AKI-OTYR
- ST Golioil

Volga group:

- ОАО Saratovneftegaz
- ОАО Ulyanovskneft

Central Siberia group:

- ООО Tomskaya Neft

RussNeft is developing over 120 oil and gas fields, and its oil reserves were estimated at 600 billion tons.

== Performance ==
Russneft's 2016 IPO, intended to repay long-term loans, netted ₽14 billion. The company's gross 2018 revenue was ₽176.365 billion (up 43 percent from 2017); its net was ₽11.752 billion RUB (up 8.7 percent from 2017), and its EBITDA was ₽18.276 billion (up 39.1 percent from 2017). In 2019, Russneft produced 7.2 million tons of oil per year and had reserves equivalent to 600.8 million tons. The company had over 15,500 employees. In 2022, the company's revenue amounted to 275 billion rubles.

== Projects ==
=== Khanty-Mansi Autonomous Okrug ===
Russneft's engineering facilities enabled commercial field operations to begin. In 2019, the Verkhne-Shapshinsky formation yielded 1.6 million tons of oil, and the Tagrinskoye field yielded 10 million tons.

=== Gas projects ===
Russneft focuses on projects to increase the efficient use of associated petroleum gas (APG), natural-gas production and gas processing. Gas utilization in 2019 was 95 percent, meeting the government requirement to reduce environmental impacts.

=== International projects ===
In autumn 2006, Russneft signed a cooperation agreement with the Azerbaijani company SOCAR on the Zyh-Govsani oil project in the southern Absheron Peninsula. In May 2007, the company obtained 37.5 percent of the Binagady project rehabilitating old oilfields near Baku. Production in Azerbaijan is 500,000 tons from fields such as Binagady, Kirmaki, and Chakhnaglyar.

== See also ==
- Petroleum industry in Russia
- List of oil exploration and production companies
