= Vladimir Shoyzhilzhapov =

Russian politician

- Владимир Дымбрылович Шойжилжапов

Member of the Federation Council from the administration of Agin-Buryat Autonomous Okrug
- In office 7 February 2001 – 4 March 2004
- Succeeded by: Khamzat Gutseriev

Personal details
- Born: 25 September 1965 (age 61) Suduntuy, Aginsky District, Russian SFSR, Soviet Union
- Education: Moscow State Pedagogical University; Academy of National Economy under the Government of the Russian Federation; Diplomatic Academy of the Ministry of Foreign Affairs of the Russian Federation

Vladimir Dymbrylovich Shoyzhilzhapov (Russian: Владимир Дымбрылович Шойжилжапов; born 25 September 1965) is a Russian politician and former member of the Federation Council. From 2001 to 2004, he represented the administration of Agin-Buryat Autonomous Okrug in the Federation Council, the upper house of the Federal Assembly of Russia.

== Biography ==
Shoyzhilzhapov was born on 25 September 1965 in the village of Suduntuy, Aginsky District. After graduating from a vocational school, he qualified as a carpenter and parquet-flooring worker. In 1991, he graduated from Moscow State Pedagogical University as a teacher of Russian language and literature. He later completed additional studies at the Academy of National Economy under the Government of the Russian Federation in 1995 and at the Diplomatic Academy of the Ministry of Foreign Affairs of the Russian Federation in 1997. In 2005, he defended a dissertation for the degree of Candidate of Sciences in political science, titled The Place and Role of Russian Regions in the Implementation of the Geopolitical Interests of the Russian Federation in the Far East: A Case Study of Relations of Chita Oblast and Agin-Buryat Autonomous Okrug with China and Mongolia.

From 1991 to 1992, Shoyzhilzhapov worked as a teacher at School No. 1204 in Moscow. In 1992, he began working in the permanent representative office of the administration of Agin-Buryat Autonomous Okrug to the Government of Russia; from 1994, he headed that office. In the second half of the 1990s, he also served as deputy head of the administration of Agin-Buryat Autonomous Okrug.

On 7 February 2001, Shoyzhilzhapov's mandate as a member of the Federation Council from the administration of Agin-Buryat Autonomous Okrug was confirmed. In the Federation Council, he served on the Budget Committee. His mandate was terminated early on 4 March 2004; the vacant seat was taken by Khamzat Gutseriev

After leaving the Federation Council, Shoyzhilzhapov worked in commercial companies. From 2004, he was vice-president of ZAO Chaika Plaza. From 2008 to 2011, he was head of real-estate management at ZAO Mospromstroy. From 2011, he served as director of the Firma Uyut branch of ZAO Mospromstroy. In 2012, Aginskaya Pravda also identified him as head of the Mospromstroy firm Uyut.

By November 2018, Shoyzhilzhapov held the post of deputy head of the Administration of the Agin-Buryat Okrug of Zabaykalsky Krai.
