= Pkhmat =

- Interactive map of Pkhmat
- Location of Pkhmat
- Coordinates: 42°49′59″N 44°39′57″E
- Country: Russia
- Federal subject: Ingushetia

Population (2010 Census)
  - Total: 0
  - Estimate (2010): 0 )
- Time zone: UTC+3 (MSK)
- OKTMO ID: 26620410121

Pkhmat (Ingush: Пхьмат, Pꜧmat) is a rural locality (aul) in Dzheyrakhsky District of the Republic of Ingushetia, Russia. Pkhmat is one of the 6 rural localities concluding Dzheyrakh rural settlement.

== History ==
Pkhamat is a former tower settlement that dates back to the medieval period. Archaeological evidence suggests that it consisted of a complex of cultural objects of Ingush architecture, including one combat tower (vaov) and five residential towers (gaala). At present, only the ruins of one tower have remained. The settlement was fortified by a defensive wall, forming a castle complex that was typical of the late Middle Ages. However, the complex was destroyed in 1944 during the period of the Ingush exile under the leadership of Joseph Stalin.

Additionally, on the mountain slope, there is a stone-box necropolis from the 10th to 13th centuries, where several artifacts have been discovered, including weapons, coins, mirrors, and ceramics. There was also a temple known as Pkhamat-Erdy, located on the northern outskirts of the village, which was destroyed in the mid-19th century. These historical landmarks contribute to the cultural heritage of the region.

== Geography ==
The village is located in the southern region of the republic, with a distance of approximately 1 kilometer to the north-west of the regional center, Dzheirakh.
