= Mikail Shishkhanov =

Russian businessman and financier (born 1972)

Mikail O. Shishkhanov
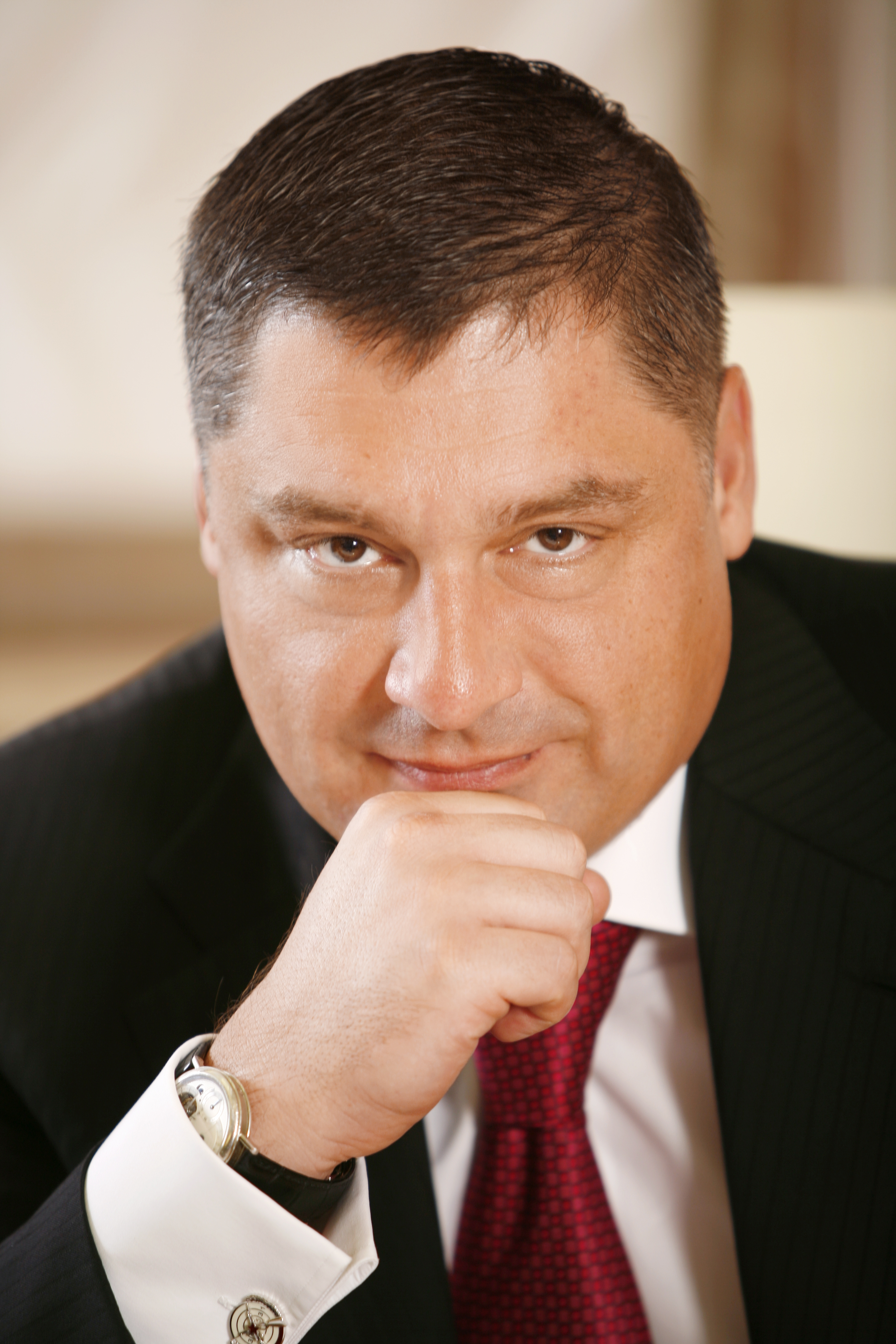
- Mikail O. Shishkhanov in 2011
- Born: August 6, 1972 (age 53); Grozny, Russia
- Education: Patrice Lumumba Peoples' Friendship University of Russia
- Occupations: Banker, financier
- Known for: Former owner and Chairman of the Board of Directors of B&N Bank.
- Spouse: Svetlana Shishkhanova
- Children: 4

Mikail O. Shishkhanov (Russian: Микаил Османович Шишханов) is a Russian businessman and financier.

He was the main shareholder of Russian Binbank between 2017. At that time he had was worth $2.3 billion and took 44th place in the Russian ranking of Forbes magazine. In September 2017, the Russian central bank compulsory took over Binbank, resulting in Shishkhanov losing the bank and all his assets.

On July 3, 2023, the Arbitration Court of the Moscow Region declared him bankrupt. He was charged with a debt of 853 billion rubles. The court ordered the selling Shishkhanov's remaining property to cover the debt.

== Early life and education ==
Mikail Shishkhanov was born on August 6, 1972, in Grozny (capital city of the Chechen Republic, Russia).

In 1995 he graduated from Patrice Lumumba Peoples' Friendship University of Russia with a master's degree in economics and law and in 2000. Shishkhanov became a Doctor of Economics, a Ph.D. in law, and Associate Member of the Russian Academy of Natural Sciences.

He is married and has four children. His hobbies are chess and boxing.

== Career ==
Shishkhanov was the majority shareholder (59.4%) of B&N Bank (Public Joint-Stock Company) and the owner of ROST Bank until 2017.

In September 2017, the Russian government Under the compulsory recovery through the Banking Sector Consolidation Fund (FCBS), took over Binbank, Rost Bank, Binbank Digital and Uralprivatbank without compensation. As a result, Shishkhanov lost the banks, but also industrial assets and left the Forbes list of the richest entrepreneurs.

Prior to 2017, Shishkhanov was also the former co-owner of several leading development companies.(INTECO Russian corporate site, Private joint-stock company “Patriot” (total shareholding was 95%.))
