= Yuzhny, Bolshesosnovsky District, Perm Krai =

Yuzhny Южный
- Settlement
- Location within Perm Krai Location within Russia
- Coordinates: 57°33′N 54°47′E
- Country: Russia
- Region: Perm Krai
- District: Bolshesosnovsky District
- Time zone: UTC+5:00

Yuzhny (Russian: Южный) is a rural locality (a settlement) in Bolshesosnovskoye Rural Settlement, Bolshesosnovsky District, Perm Krai, Russia. The population was 136 as of 2010. There are 2 streets.

== Geography ==
Yuzhny is located 8 km east of Bolshaya Sosnova (the district's administrative centre) by road. Bolshaya Sosnova is the nearest rural locality.
