= Tamariani =

Rural locality in Ingushetia

Tamariani Тамариани
- Selo
- Interactive map of Tamariani
- Location of Tamariani Tamariani (Republic of Ingushetia)
- Coordinates: 42°51′22″N 44°38′54″E
- Country: Russia
- Federal subject: Ingushetia

Population (2010 Census)
  - Total: 0
  - Estimate (2021): 0 )

Administrative status
  - Subordinated to: Dzheyrakhsky District
- Time zone: UTC+3 (MSK)
- Postal code: 386430
- OKTMO ID: 26620410126

Tamariani (Russian: Тамариани) is a rural locality (a selo) in Dzheyrakhsky District of the Republic of Ingushetia, Russia. Tamariani is one of the 6 rural localities constituting Dzheyrakh rural settlement. Tamariani has only one street, named Vodnaya, which means aquatic in Russian, referring to its geographical positioning on the right embankment of the Terek river.
