= Gorbani =

- Interactive map of Gorbani
- Location of Gorbani
- Coordinates: 42°54′N 44°36′E
- Country: Russia
- Federal subject: Ingushetia

Population
  - Estimate (2024): 1 )
- Time zone: UTC+3 (MSK)
- OKTMO ID: 26620410106

Gorbani (Russian: Горбани, Ingush: КхацIатIе) is an unpopulated rural locality (aul) in Dzheyrakhsky District of the Republic of Ingushetia, Russia. Gorbani is one of the six rural localities comprising Dzheyrakh rural settlement.

In 2013 a plant for the production of dolomite flour was built in Gorbani.
