= Mikhail Gutseriev =

Kazakh-Russian entrepreneur and poet (born 1958)

- Михаил Гуцериев
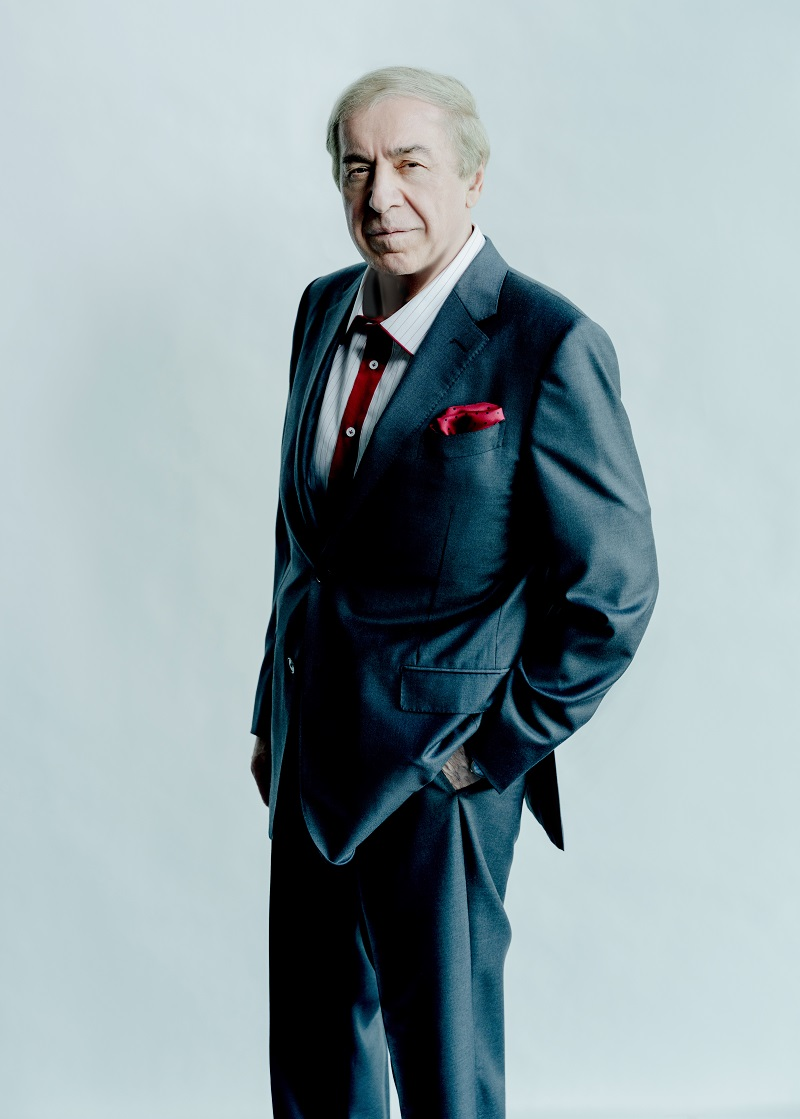
- Gutseriev in 2005
- Born: Mikail (Mikhail) Safarbekovich Gutseriev; 9 March 1958 (age 68); Akmolinsk, Kazakh SSR, Soviet Union
- Citizenship: Russian
- Education: Gubkin Russian State University of Oil and Gas; Financial University under the Government of the Russian Federation
- Occupations: Businessman poet lyricist
- Known for: chairman of the board of directors PJSC Russneft, owner
- Awards: Order of Friendship; Order of the Badge of Honour

Mikail (Mikhail) Safarbekovich Gutseriev (Note: Russian: Михаи́л Сафарбе́кович Гуцери́ев, Ingush: Гуцаранаькъан Сафарбика Микаьил, romanized: Gutsaranäqhan Safarbika Mikäil.) (born 9 March 1958) is a Russian billionaire businessperson of Ingush descent. Gutseriev earned his fortune after the collapse of the Soviet Union.

He is the former owner of Russneft, one of Russia's largest oil companies. Since 2002, he has been the permanent participant of the Forbes annual ranking of 200 richest Russians, where, as of 2023, he has taken 34th place with $3.5 billion. He fled Russia in 2007 after being charged with tax evasion. In 2010, he came back to Russia after the charges were withdrawn.

== Biography ==
Gutseriev was born on 9 March 1958 in a large Ingush family in Akmolinsk. His family was repressed and exiled to Kazakhstan. His father, Safarbek Gutseriev, worked as a senior investigator for especially important cases in the Akmolinsk regional directorate of the NKVD; he was arrested in 1948 and released six months after Joseph Stalin's death. His mother was Marem Yakubovna Akhilgova. Among his brothers are Khamzat Gutseriev, a former law-enforcement official and member of the Federation Council, and businessman Sait-Salam Gutseriev.

He finished high school No. 23 in Grozny, Checheno-Ingush ASSR. The school, completely destroyed during the First Chechen War, was rebuilt in 2005 with Gutseriev's financial support.

From 1982, Gutseriev worked as a process engineer, later on – as a senior process engineer of Grozny Production Association at the RSFSR Ministry of Local Industry, Grozny. He became CEO of the Association. In 1991, Gutseriev was elected Chairman of Businessmen Association of Checheno-Ingush ASSR.

In 1992, when Dzhokhar Dudayev took power, Gutseriev had to leave his business and moved to Moscow, where he founded industrial and financial company "BIN" (Bank of Investments and Innovations), uniting industrial, trading and financial enterprises. In 1993 he founded and headed the Joint Stock Commercial Bank BIN.

1994 marked Gutseriev's development of the free economic zone for residents, the first one in the post Soviet countries, called the Zone of economic well-being Ingushetia (ZEWI). On 19 June 1994 the Government of the Russian Federation issued Resolution No. 740 on establishing ZEWI and appointed Gutseriev as the head of its Financial sector.

ZEWI received the legal right to return taxes paid to the federal budget back to the budget of the republic. According to the Federal Tax Service of Ingushetia, for the period from 1994 to 1997 that sum amounted to 1 billion 388 million denominated rubles. The financial corporation "BIN", being the official agent of the government of Ingushetia, was engaged in the registration of enterprises in the zone of economic favor. All financial flows of the Ingushetia free economic zone were accumulated on the accounts of the Ministry of Finance of the Russian Federation and the Republic of Ingushetia and were controlled by the federal and republican tax authorities. ZEWI existed until 3 July 1997.

However, in August 1997, in order to complete the construction of ZEWI facilities Gutseriev created the Center for Entrepreneurship Development (CED). During the operation of the CED, large infrastructure facilities were put into operation, in particular, water supply networks for settlements in Ingushetia, external engineering networks for a gas turbine power plant, sections of gas pipelines and roads that were important for the economic infrastructure of Ingushetia. In addition, thanks to the efforts of the CED, the construction of a number of residential buildings and the government complex in Magas were completed, and other social and industrial facilities were built. The main investor of the CED was Mikhail Gutseriev.

=== Education ===
In 1981, Mikhail Gutseriev graduated from the Dzhambul Technological Institute of Light and Food Industry with a degree in "Leather and Fur Technology". In 1995 he graduated from Finance Academy under the Government of Russian Federation, majoring in "Finance and Credits", Gubkin Russian State University of Oil and Gas, majoring in "Methods and Technology of Oil and Gas Engineering", St. Petersburg University of Law, majoring in "Civil Law" and Post graduate course at St. Petersburg University of Law, having received master's degree in "Criminal Procedural Law". Eventually he pursued Doctoral studies at the Plekhanov Russian University of Economics, majoring in "Free Economic Zones". In 1996 he defended his PhD thesis on "Criminality in major cities: State of affairs and prevention problems on the materials of Moscow and Saint-Petersburg in Saint-Petersburg Law University, PhD in Law.

=== State Duma ===
In 1995 he was elected as deputy to the State Duma, where he took up the post of Deputy chairman. Due to his position, he sold a 100% stake of AKB B&N (BIN) and thus exited from the equity of the bank. In 1996 Mikhail Gutseriev initiated, developed and proposed for consideration of the State Duma a regulation on establishing a "Center for International Business", a standard offshore zone for non-residents. The State Duma approved the Federal Law on the "Center for International Business" (No. 16-FZ), with the major provisions compiling with general regulations of the laws on international businesses. The president approved the Law on 30 January 1996. The Law was effective for 1 year and international non-residents started their registration. The economic crisis of 1998, a strong decline in the Ruble exchange rate, and further default made the government suspend the effect of the law which has been in a "sleeping mode" so far.

In 1999 for the second time Gutseriev was elected a State Duma Deputy for the Third Convocation of the Federal Assembly. However, on 14 January 2000, Gutseriev was elected as the President of Slavneft at the extraordinary meeting of shareholders of the company and had to turn down the Deputy's mandate.

Gutseriev is the author of a monograph and an array of research publications on free economic free economic zones and offshore business issues in Russia.

=== Getting back into business ===
On 27 February 2001, Gutseriev was elected the Vice President of the Russian Union of Industrialists and Entrepreneurs.

In 2002 the stocks of Slavneft were sold to Sibneft Consortium (now Gazpromneft) and Tyumen Oil Company for US$1.86 bn, and Gutseriev established and became a head of OJSC NK "RussNeft" in 2002. The stocks of Slavneft were sold at knockdown prices.

In September 2002, Gutseriev founded and ran RussNeft, the oil and gas company.

=== RussNeft case ===
In 2006 he was accused of tax evasion, forcing him to sell RussNeft at a fraction of its value, before fleeing to London, due to fears of persecution and legal repercussions in Russia.

In the end of July 2007 Gutseriev in an open letter announced that authorities made an unprecedented pressure on him, and he was forced to sell RussNeft to the Basic Element holding, owned by loyal to the Kremlin Oleg Deripaska. Gutseriev stepped down as a President of RussNeft and announced his suspension of entrepreneurial activity (apart from RussNeft he owned Russian coal and many other companies) and his decision to move on to scientific endeavor.

On 28 August 2007 The Tverskoy court of Moscow issued arrest warrant in absentia for Gutseriev, meeting the request of the Investigative Committee under the Ministry of Internal Affairs. Russia issues an international arrest warrant for Gutseriev. At that moment Gutseriev had already been in London, having got US$3 billion from Oleg Deripaska from the RussNeft sale.

On 16 October 2007 Gutseriev applied for political asylum to the Border and Immigration Agency of the Home Office but this information was officially refuted.

Near the end of October 2010, the Investigative Committee varied the preventive measure for Gutseriev from arrest in absentia on undertaking not to leave his usual place of residence.

In January 2010 Gutseriev regained his control over the 100% of the oil company. By the mid-April 2010 all the charges against Gutseriev were dropped, the criminal cases were dismissed. In April 2010 it was announced that Gutseriev has sold 49% of the company to Joint-Stock Financial Corporation Sistema and 2% more to Sberbank of Russia.

On 7 May 2010, Gutseriev came back to Russia in order to visit the tombs of his parents and son.

In the summer of 2013 Mikhail Gutseriev once again became the sole owner of JSC RussNeft.

In February 2015, bearing in mind massive expansion of the business of the two of his major oil companies JSC RussNeft and JSC Neftisa, he became the chairman of the board of directors both companies, having focused on the strategic management of his assets.

After the European Union introduced sanctions against Gutseriev in 2021, he resigned from the board of directors of RussNeft, and sold control in Neftisa to his younger brother Sait-Salam.

=== Activities for the release of victims of kidnapping and hostage-taking ===
Between 1996 and 2006, Gutseriev played a key role in helping the Russian special services to release a large number of hostages kidnapped in the North Caucasus by various criminal groups. Thus, according to the memoirs of A. Kh. Amirkhanov, M. S. Gutseriev, being at that time the Vice-Speaker of the State Duma, "was the principal liaison in all negotiations and all special operations for the release of hostages." In particular, thanks to Gutseriev's activities, the following people were rescued from captivity: Slovak construction person Imrich Rigo (kidnapped on 10 October 1996, released on 14 February 1997), director of the Swiss firm Seibert-Stinnes Robert Hill (kidnapped on 2 February 1997, released on 2 July 1997) and director of a brick factory from Serbia Milan Evtic (kidnapped in December 1997). Gutseriev also "played a decisive role" in the release of Stanislav Taslitsky, the head of the construction of a water pipeline in Ingushetia, and the banker Viktor Morgun, from the captivity.

On 1 May 1998, Valentin Vlasov, the Plenipotentiary Representative of the Government of the Russian Federation in the Chechen Republic, was captured by a group of Chechen militants on the Rostov-Baku highway. Being aware of his successful experience of the hostages release, officials of the Ministry of Internal Affairs of Russia appealed to Gutseriev to help organize the negotiation process. According to the memoirs of the Minister of Internal Affairs of the Russian Federation (1998-1999) and the Prime Minister of the Russian Federation (1999) Sergey Stepashin, the negotiation process was led by Gutseriev, thanks to whom it was possible to determine the location of Vlasov. Thanks to a special operation conducted under the leadership of Deputy Interior Minister V. Rushailo, on 13 November 1998, V. Vlasov was released. According to Stepashin, Gutseriev refused a state award for this special operation.

On 29 January 1998, in Vladikavkaz, a French citizen, representative of the UN High Commissioner for Refugees, Vincent Cochetel, was kidnapped. From Moscow, the operation to liberate Cochetel was led by Interior Minister S. Stepashin, and the negotiations and all contacts were conducted by Gutseriev. On 12 December 1998, Vincent Cochetel was released as a result of a special operation carried out by the Ministry of Internal Affairs of the Russian Federation with the participation of RF Deputy Minister of Internal Affairs Vladimir Rushailo and Mikhail Gutseriev. For this operation, Stepashin was awarded the Order of the Commander of the Legion of Honor by French President Jacques Chirac. According to S. Stepashin, "this award is our joint one with Mikhail Gutseriev, although, as I have already said, he treated the orders quite philosophically".

In addition, it is known about the participation of M. Gutseriev in organizing the release from captivity of the captain of the Russian Armed Forces Vitaly Korotin, major of the North Caucasian RUBOP of the Ministry of Internal Affairs of the Russian Federation Vitaly Khapov and five employees of the regiment of the patrol and guard service of the Ministry of Internal Affairs. Gutseriev also took part in the successful release of five women who were fraudulently lured to Chechnya and abducted. Besides, Gutseriev was among those who rescued from captivity Ilez Deniev, a religious figure and the son of Sheikh Deni Arsanov.

In early 1999, S. Stepashin asked Gutseriev to help rescue the servants of the Russian Orthodox Church, Peter Makarov and Sergei Potapov. They were released in May of the same year along with five Russian servicemen.

In 1999, during the assault of Grozny by the armed forces, Gutseriev managed to agree with war lords upon the evacuation of about 90 people living in a nursing home in the Staropromyslovsky district of the capital of the Chechen Republic.

On 4 October 1999, Dmitry Balburov, a journalist of the Moscow News, was kidnapped in Chechnya. Gutseriev took part in his release. On 1 September 2004, terrorists took hostages at school No. 1 in Beslan. In the evening of the same day, the operational headquarters organized to rescue the hostages decided to involve Gutseriev in the negotiation process. On the morning of 2 September 2004, Gutseriev came into contact with terrorists and began negotiations. He obtained a number of concessions from the terrorists, namely to accept supplies of drinking water for children, to evacuate the bodies of the hostages they killed and to release 26 people (24 children were taken out from the school). During the negotiations Gutseriev offered himself as a hostage, asking to release the children, but the terrorists refused. According to the memoirs of A. Kh. Amirkhanov, after Beslan, Basayev said that Gutseriev "deceived the mujahideen in Beslan, telling them that there would definitely not be an assault, and persuaded them to let the Ministry of Emergency Situations car with special forces near the building. […] We will make him choke on his own blood and feel all its bitterness." Many of the hostages were not rescued. Nevertheless, according to the conclusion of the commission for evaluation of the operational headquarters actions, "the involvement of reputable members of the Ingush diaspora Gutseriev and Aushev in the negotiations was a timely measure, adequate to the current situation".

In 2006, at the request of the authorities, Gutseriev was again involved in the negotiation process and helped to release a member of the Ingush parliament, Magomed Chakhkiev.

For many years of work on the release of kidnapping and hostage-taking victims, Gutseriev was repeatedly offered various state orders and medals, but he always refused them with the words: "I just fulfilled my civic duty. And on human grief, I won't hang a medal on my chest".

=== SAFMAR ===
Gutseriev is the biggest owner of the commercial real estate on Tverskaya Street in Moscow.

Development of industrial companies owned by Gutseriev allowed purchasing new assets leading to business great diversification. With the pursue of efficient management of the assets portfolio, the businessman established AO Safmar Group, a managing company. Gutseriev became a head of the Group's Board who defines the development strategy of the holding. Within the period from 2015 to 2020 Safmar was joined by large electronic retailers M.Video and Eldorado, coal mining enterprises Kuzbasskaya Toplivnaya Company, Krasnoyarskrayugol, etc., oil companies (Sladkovsko-Zarechnoye located in Orenburg region), refineries (Afipsky Refinery), a number of construction and development holdings (A101), major logistics operators (MLP, etc.), non-government pension funds, leasing and insurance companies.

=== Business in Belarus, Azerbaijan and Kazakhstan ===
Gutseriev has been implementing business projects in Belarus since 2000, when he was appointed by the governments of Russia and Belarus as president of Slavneft, the Russian and Belarusian state oil and gas company. Lead my him, Slavneft upgraded Mozyr Oil Refinery, which became part of the company. After Slavneft became private and was sold to TNK-BP and Sibneft, Gutseriev resigned from the position of president of Slavneft. In 2005 in order to increase export opportunities, RussNeft, established by Gutseriev, built an oil loading railway terminal in Bryansk region to deliver raw materials to Belarus, Ukraine, the Baltic States and Eastern Europe.

In 2011, Gutseriev's Slavkali company signed an investment agreement with the government of Belarus, according to which $2 billion was to be invested in the construction of Nezhinsky MPP at a potassium site near the city of Lyuban, 150 km from Minsk. The agreement also provides commitments to invest $250 million into social and economic infrastructure projects of Belarus, some of which, worth $180 million, have already been implemented: the Renaissance hotel, managed by the American company Marriott, the office center, business aviation terminal in major airport and Krasnoselskoye recreation estate for personal needs and recreation of employees.

In July 2017, the construction of the plant started.

In January and February 2020, during another "oil conflict" between Minsk and Moscow, Gutseriev's oil companies were the only companies which, before signing contracts with major suppliers, ensured the sale of Russian oil to Belarus. At the same time, the volume of supplies was about 500 thous. tons per month, which accounted for 25% of the total volume of oil supplies to Belarus. At the same time, in order to maintain the balance of oil products and the needs of the population, in addition to Gutseriev's companies, oil was supplied to Belarus by the Azerbaijani state company SOCAR, the national oil company of Saudi Arabia Saudi Aramco, and mining companies in Norway. US Secretary of State Michael Pompeo at a meeting with President of Belarus A. Lukashenko said that the United States is ready to fully meet the country's needs in raw materials.

Gutseriev built an elite private gymnasium in Drazdy (Minsk), which Nikolai Lukashenko graduated from in 2022.

Gutseriev is the owner of GCM Global Energy Inc., the British company, which produces oil in Azerbaijan and Kazakhstan.

=== Media ===
In 2010 Gutseriev became the key player in the broadcasting market of the Russian Federation, owning a total of eight Media and Radio stations.

In June 2012 he acquired broadcasting stations "Просто Радио" (Moscow, 94 FM) and "Dobriye Pesni" (Moscow, 94.4 FM) from Alexander Lebedev. In January 2013 it became known that 75% of the shares of Krutoy Media Holding (Love Radio, Radio Dacha and Taxi FM) were purchased by Gutseriev while the remaining 25% were kept by Igor Krutoy. In November 2013 he acquired Finam FM Broadcasting station (Moscow, 99.6 FM), which together with"Vostok FM" and "Vesna FM" formed Izyum Holding. In January 2017 Mikhail Gutseriev became an owner of Bridge Media Group, one of the largest television holdings of the country that includes number of the popular music channels.

=== Production ===
Mikhail Gutseriev is a producer for different shows, TV programs and music videos. They include The Thousand and One Nights or Territory of Love, A New Year's Tale New Year's musicals on NTV Channel, Sing in Your Soul talent show, Victoria Russian National Music Award, Chanson of the Year Award, Big Love classical music concert, New Music pop music show, Radio Dacha Songs show, Stars of the East, Big Love Show, Razgulay Show, Velvet Chanson, Night of Happy Hopes charitable Christmas shows, Winter Show. He also acted as a producer for Ani Lorak DIVA show, The Wight Swan and Anna Karenina films, REKA FEST festivals and BRIDGE TV NEED FOR FEST in Turkey, produced Russian national football team hymn, Grammy Award exhibition in Russia and other projects.

Mikhail Gutseriev Production Center received an award from RU.TV Channel as the best production center of the year. In 2022 TopHit Music Award named Mikhail Gutseriev Production Center Record Label of the Year.

== Sanctions ==
On 21 June 2021, Mikhail Gutseriev was added to the European Union sanctions list, with the explanation that he "benefits from and supports the Lukashenko regime." The sanctions were imposed in response to the suppression of protests in Belarus and the incident involving the forced landing of a Boeing 737 in Minsk. The measures include a ban on entry into EU countries and the freezing of personal assets within the EU. By early 2022, all of Gutseriev's European bank accounts and assets had been frozen. The sanctions allow for the blocking of any business in which Gutseriev holds more than 50% ownership or has the right to make decisions unilaterally. EU legislation considers not only formal ownership but also actual control.

Following his inclusion in the EU blacklist, Gutseriev stepped down from the board of directors of RussNeft, which he had chaired. On 6 July 2021, Albania, Iceland, Liechtenstein, Norway, North Macedonia, and Montenegro joined the EU's June sanctions package.

On 7 July 2021, Switzerland announced its alignment with the EU sanctions list. On 9 August 2021, the United Kingdom imposed sanctions against Gutseriev.

On 19 April 2022, in the context of Russia's invasion of Ukraine, Gutseriev was sanctioned by Canada as one of the "associates of the Russian regime" for his "complicity in Russia's unjustified invasion of Ukraine".

On 19 October 2022, he was included in Ukraine's sanctions list for "supporting actions and policies that undermine and threaten the territorial integrity, sovereignty, and independence of Ukraine, as well as its stability and security". On similar grounds, he was also sanctioned by Australia, Switzerland, and New Zealand.

In April 2022, due to the imposed sanctions, Cyprus revoked the "golden passports" of Gutseriev and his family members, stripping them of Cypriot citizenship.

On 6 September 2023, the Court of Justice of the European Union dismissed lawsuits filed by Gutseriev and several other Russian businessmen seeking removal from the EU sanctions list.

On 16 November 2023, Mikhail Gutseriev filed a new lawsuit challenging the rulings of the General Court of the European Union regarding the sanctions imposed on him.

In November 2024, Gutseriev, along with several other Russian oligarchs, was formally stripped of Cypriot citizenship ("golden passport").

On 8 May 2025, the EU Court rejected Gutseriev's appeal against the decision to keep him on the Belarus sanctions list.

== Personal life ==
Gutseriev is married and has two sons (Chingiz, Said) and a daughter (Sofya). His elder son Chingiz died from a brain hemorrhage after crashing his Ferrari in 2007. Gutseriev's other son, Said, is a businessperson. In 2016, Said held a wedding that reportedly cost $1 billion.

The younger brother of Mikhail, Sait-Salam (born 1959) is a businessman. Mikhail transferred his Rossneft stake to Sait-Salam when he was placed under sanctions.

Gutseriev is involved in poetry writing and song writing.

In 2020 during the pandemic Gutseriev offered Moscow authorities the use of his hotels to fight the coronavirus.

In 2022, a joint investigation by the Belarusian Investigative Center, Transparency International and The Guardian found several properties in London owned by Said Gutseriev, Mikhail's son. Previously, the property owned by Said was mentioned in the Pandora Papers. Representatives of the family told reporters that Said has no business ties with his father and that Mikhail has nothing to do with these assets, while at the same time, a significant part of these properties were purchased when Said was still studying and not involved in business.

== See also ==
- List of Russian billionaires
