= Yuzhny, Voronezh Oblast =

Yuzhny Южный
- Settlement
- Location within Voronezh Oblast Location within Russia
- Coordinates: 49°45′N 40°46′E
- Country: Russia
- Region: Voronezh Oblast
- District: Bogucharsky District
- Time zone: UTC+3:00

Yuzhny (Russian: Южный) is a rural locality (a settlement) in Medovskoye Rural Settlement, Bogucharsky District, Voronezh Oblast, Russia. The population was 413 as of 2010. There are 8 streets.

== Geography ==
Yuzhny is located 36 km southeast of Boguchar (the district's administrative centre) by road. Medovo is the nearest rural locality.
