= Yuzhny, Vladimir Oblast =

Yuzhny Южный
- Settlement
- Location within Vladimir Oblast Location within Russia
- Coordinates: 55°21′N 41°15′E
- Country: Russia
- Region: Vladimir Oblast
- District: Melenkovsky District
- Time zone: UTC+3:00

Yuzhny (Russian: Южный) is a rural locality (a settlement) in Danilovskoye Rural Settlement, Melenkovsky District, Vladimir Oblast, Russia. The population was 125 as of 2010. There are 5 streets.

== Geography ==
Yuzhny is located 30 km west from Melenki (the district's administrative centre) by road. Pichugino is the nearest rural locality.
