= Yuzhnoye, Republic of Dagestan =

Yuzhnoye Южное
- Selo
- Location within Republic of Dagestan Location within Russia
- Coordinates: 43°48′N 46°43′E
- Country: Russia
- Region: Republic of Dagestan
- District: Kizlyarsky District
- Time zone: UTC+3:00

Yuzhnoye (Russian: Южное) is a rural locality (a selo) and the administrative centre of Yuzhny Selsoviet, Kizlyarsky District, Republic of Dagestan, Russia. The population was 1,791 as of 2010. There are 27 streets.

== Nationalities ==
Avars, Russians, Dargins, Lezgins and Kumyks live there.

== Geography ==
Yuzhnoye is located 5 km south of Kizlyar (the district's administrative centre) by road. Kizlyar is the nearest rural locality.
