= Yuzhny, Amur Oblast =

Yuzhny Южный
- Settlement
- Location within Amur Oblast Location within Russia
- Coordinates: 50°18′N 129°00′E
- Country: Russia
- Region: Amur Oblast
- District: Oktyabrsky District
- Time zone: UTC+9:00

Yuzhny (Russian: Южный) is a rural locality (a settlement) in Paninsky Selsoviet of Oktyabrsky District, Amur Oblast, Russia. The population was 84 as of 2018. There are 6 streets.

== Geography ==
Yuzhny is located 13 km southwest of Yekaterinoslavka (the district's administrative centre) by road. Yekaterinoslavka is the nearest rural locality.
