= Slavneft =

Russian oil company

- Native name: ПАО «НГК «Славнефть»
- Company type: public company
- Industry: Oil refining
- Founded: 1994
- Headquarters: Moscow, Russia
- Revenue: ▼214.509 billion rubles (2016, IFRS)
- Operating income: ▼36.13 billion rubles (2016, IFRS)
- Net income: ▼ -10.28 billion rubles (2014, IFRS)
- Website: www.slavneft.ru

Slavneft (Russian: ПАО «НГК «Славнефть») is a Russian oil company, and ranks eighth largest nationally. The company is headquartered in Moscow.

== History ==
In 1994, the Russian and Belarusian governments created a state-owned joint enterprise, with each side placing an oil refinery as assets into the deal.

This company was privatized in 2002, at a valuation of US$1.86 billion.

Slavneft was in 26th place in the Forbes ranking of the "70 largest investor companies in Russia — 2024".

== Assets ==
The company's subsidiary, "Slavneft-Megionnetftegaz" (Russian: Славнефть-Мегионнефтегаз), was responsible for building up the city of Megion as a center for the oil industry. The company also operates Yaroslavl Refinery in Russia and Mozyr Refinery in Belarus as its main oil refineries.

== Owners and management ==
The company is owned on an equal basis by Gazprom and Rosneft.

From 2015 to April 2023, Mikhail Osipov was the manager of Slavneft. In April 2024, Natalia Sakhno was appointed to the role.

== See also ==
- Petroleum industry in Russia
