= Malgobek =

Town in the Republic of Ingushetia, Russia

Malgobek Малгобек
- Town

Other transcription(s)
  - Ingush: Магӏалбике
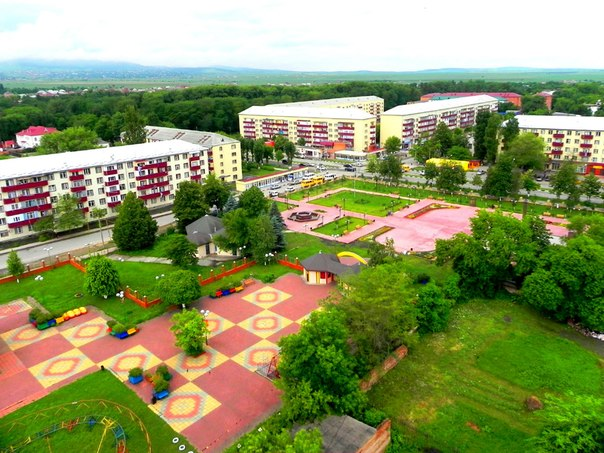
- View of Malgobek

- Flag Coat of arms
- Interactive map of Malgobek
- Location of Malgobek Malgobek (Republic of Ingushetia)
- Coordinates: 43°30′N 44°45′E
- Country: Russia
- Federal subject: Ingushetia
- Founded: 1934
- Town status since: 1939
- Elevation: 409 m (1,342 ft)

Population (2010 Census)
  - Total: 31,018
  - Estimate (2024): 37,999 (+22.5%)

Administrative status
  - Subordinated to: town of republic significance of Malgobek
  - Capital of: Malgobeksky District, town of republic significance of Malgobek

Municipal status
  - Urban okrug: Malgobek Urban Okrug
- Time zone: UTC+3 (MSK)
- Postal code: 386302
- Dialing code: +7 87346
- OKTMO ID: 26715000001
- Website: www.malgobek.ru

Malgobek (Russian: Малгобе́к; Ingush: Магӏалбике, romanized: Maghalbike) is a town in the Republic of Ingushetia, Russia, located 45 kilometers (28 mi) northwest of the republic's capital of Magas. Population: 31,018 (2010 census); 41,876 (2002 census); 20,364 (1989 Soviet census).

== History ==
In 1934, the selo of Voznesenskoye was granted work settlement status. It served then recently discovered oilfields, on the territory of former Ingush villages of Malgobek-Balka (Малгобек-Балка). Town status was granted to it in 1939.

During World War II, Malgobek was occupied by the German forces from Saturday, September 12, 1942 to January 3, 1943, when it was recaptured by the Red Army. In October 2007, Malgobek was conferred the status of City of Military Glory by President Vladimir Putin for heroically stopping the German forces at its borders.

In the 1990s, the town's population doubled due to an influx of refugees from the neighboring war-torn Chechen Republic.

== Administrative and municipal status ==
Within the framework of administrative divisions, Malgobek serves as the administrative center of Malgobeksky District, even though it is not a part of it. As an administrative division, it is incorporated separately as the town of republic significance of Malgobek—an administrative unit with the status equal to that of the districts. As a municipal division, the town of republic significance of Malgobek is incorporated as Malgobek Urban Okrug.

== Economy ==
Besides the oil activities of the company Ingushneftegazprom, the town's industry includes woodworking and food related industries.

== Climate ==
Malgobek has a humid continental climate (Köppen climate classification: Dfa).

Climate data for Malgobek
Month	Jan	Feb	Mar	Apr	May	Jun	Jul	Aug	Sep	Oct	Nov	Dec	Year
Mean daily maximum °C (°F)	0.5 (32.9)	2.0 (35.6)	7.4 (45.3)	15.9 (60.6)	22.0 (71.6)	25.8 (78.4)	28.1 (82.6)	27.7 (81.9)	22.4 (72.3)	15.6 (60.1)	8.1 (46.6)	3.0 (37.4)	14.9 (58.8)
Daily mean °C (°F)	−3.3 (26.1)	−2.2 (28.0)	2.8 (37.0)	9.8 (49.6)	15.8 (60.4)	19.6 (67.3)	22.1 (71.8)	21.6 (70.9)	16.4 (61.5)	10.2 (50.4)	4.0 (39.2)	−0.7 (30.7)	9.7 (49.4)
Mean daily minimum °C (°F)	−7.1 (19.2)	−6.4 (20.5)	−1.7 (28.9)	3.8 (38.8)	9.7 (49.5)	13.5 (56.3)	16.2 (61.2)	15.5 (59.9)	10.5 (50.9)	4.9 (40.8)	0.0 (32.0)	−4.3 (24.3)	4.6 (40.2)
Average precipitation mm (inches)	26 (1.0)	27 (1.1)	35 (1.4)	55 (2.2)	85 (3.3)	106 (4.2)	83 (3.3)	69 (2.7)	50 (2.0)	40 (1.6)	36 (1.4)	31 (1.2)	643 (25.4)

== Notable people ==
- Muslim Evloev (1995 – 2020), Russian naturalized Kyrgyzstani freestyle wrestler

== Bibliography ==
- Оzdoyev, I. A. (1980). Оzdoyevа, F. G.; Kurkiyev, А. S. (eds.). Русско-ингушский словарь: 40 000 слов [Russian-Ingush Dictionary: 40,000 words] (in Ingush and Russian). Мoscow: Russian language. pp. 1–832.
