= Malgobeksky District =

Malgobeksky District Малгобекский район (Russian)
- District

Other transcription(s)
  - Ingush: Магӏалбика шахьар
  - Chechen: Малхабекан кӀошт
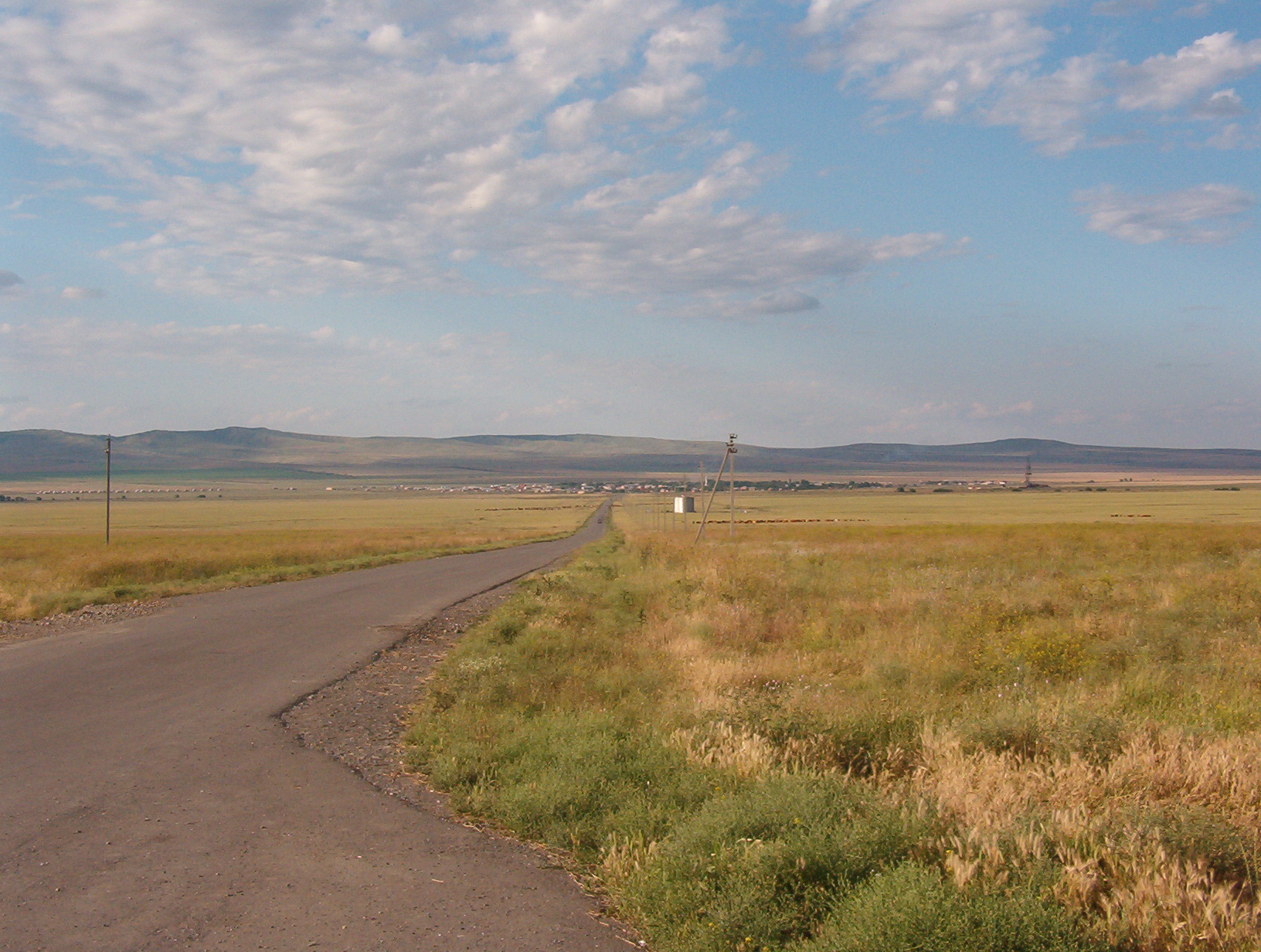
- The selo of Novy Redant in Malgobeksky District

- Flag Coat of arms
- Location of Malgobeksky District in the Republic of Ingushetia
- Coordinates: 43°31′N 44°35′E
- Country: Russia
- Federal subject: Republic of Ingushetia
- Administrative center: Malgobek

Area
  - Total: 670 km^{2} (260 sq mi)

Population (2010 Census)
  - Total: 47,754
  - Density: 71/km^{2} (180/sq mi)
  - Urban: 0%
  - Rural: 100%

Administrative structure
  - Inhabited localities: 12 rural localities

Municipal structure
  - Municipally incorporated as: Malgobeksky Municipal District
  - Municipal divisions: 0 urban settlements, 12 rural settlements
- Time zone: UTC+3 (MSK)
- OKTMO ID: 26615000
- Website: http://malgobek-rn.com

Population of Malgobeksky District
- 2010 Census: 47,754
- 2002 Census: 61,617
- 1989 Census: 25,272
- 1979 Census: 22,645

Malgobeksky District (Russian: Малгобе́кский райо́н; Ingush: Магӏалбика шахьар, Maghalbika šaꜧar) is an administrative and municipal district (raion), one of the four in the Republic of Ingushetia, Russia. It is located in the north of the republic. The area of the district is 670 square kilometers (260 sq mi). Its administrative center is the town of Malgobek (which is not administratively a part of the district). As of the 2010 Census, the total population of the district was 47,754.

== Administrative and municipal status ==
Within the framework of administrative divisions, Malgobeksky District is one of the four in the Republic of Ingushetia and has administrative jurisdiction over all of its twelve rural localities. The town of Malgobek serves as its administrative center, despite being incorporated separately as a town of republic significance—an administrative unit with the status equal to that of the districts.

As a municipal division, the district is incorporated as Malgobeksky Municipal District. Its twelve rural localities are incorporated into twelve rural settlements within the municipal district. The town of republic significance of Malgobek is incorporated separately from the district as Malgobek Urban Okrug, but serves as the administrative center of the municipal district as well.

== Border issues ==
Malgobeksky and Sunzhensky Districts are a point at issue in the Chechen-Ingush border delimitation discussion.
