= Greg Garland =

American businessman

- Education: Texas A&M University
- Occupations: Chairman, Phillips 66
- Spouse: married
- Children: 4

Greg C. Garland is an American businessman in oil, natural gas and chemicals industries, and was the executive chairman (and former CEO) of Phillips 66.

== Early life ==
Greg Garland received a bachelor's degree in chemical engineering from Texas A&M University in 1980.

== Career ==
Garland joined Phillips Petroleum Company in 1980, first as an engineer for the plastics technical center and then later as a sales engineer for plastics resins. He went on to become the manager for advanced materials, and then business development director and olefins manager for chemicals.

From 1992 to 1994, he managed the K-Resin business unit at Chevron Phillips Chemical Company. From 1995 to 1997 he was general manager of Natural Gas Liquids, and since 1997, a general manager of Qatar and the Middle East. From July 2000 to October 2001 he was senior vice president of planning and strategic transactions, and from October 2001 to April 2008, senior vice president of planning and specialty products/chemicals. From April 2008 to February 2011 he was CEO of Chevron Phillips Chemical.

From October 2010 to April 2012 he was the senior vice president of exploration and production for Americas at ConocoPhillips. From April 30, 2012 to June 2014 he was the president. In April 2012, he also became chairman and CEO of Phillips 66 and its subsidiaries the Phillips 66ers, Phillips 66 Pipeline LLC, Phillips 66 Partners GP LLC, and Phillips 66 Partners LP. Since 2013, he has been director of Amgen Inc. In 2022, he stepped down from the position of executive chairman of Philips 66.

== Political appointments ==
He sits on the board of the American Petroleum Institute, the board for National Petroleum Council, the Greater Houston Partnership, and the Engineering Advisory Board for Texas A&M University. He is a director of DCP Midstream Partners, LLC, a director of the American Chemistry Council Inc, and vice president at the trade association of the American Fuel and Petrochemical Manufacturers.

== Personal life ==
Garland is married, with four children.
