= Ingo (brand) =

European filling station brand

- Number of locations: 500
- Parent: Circle K
- Website: ingo.dk, ingo.se

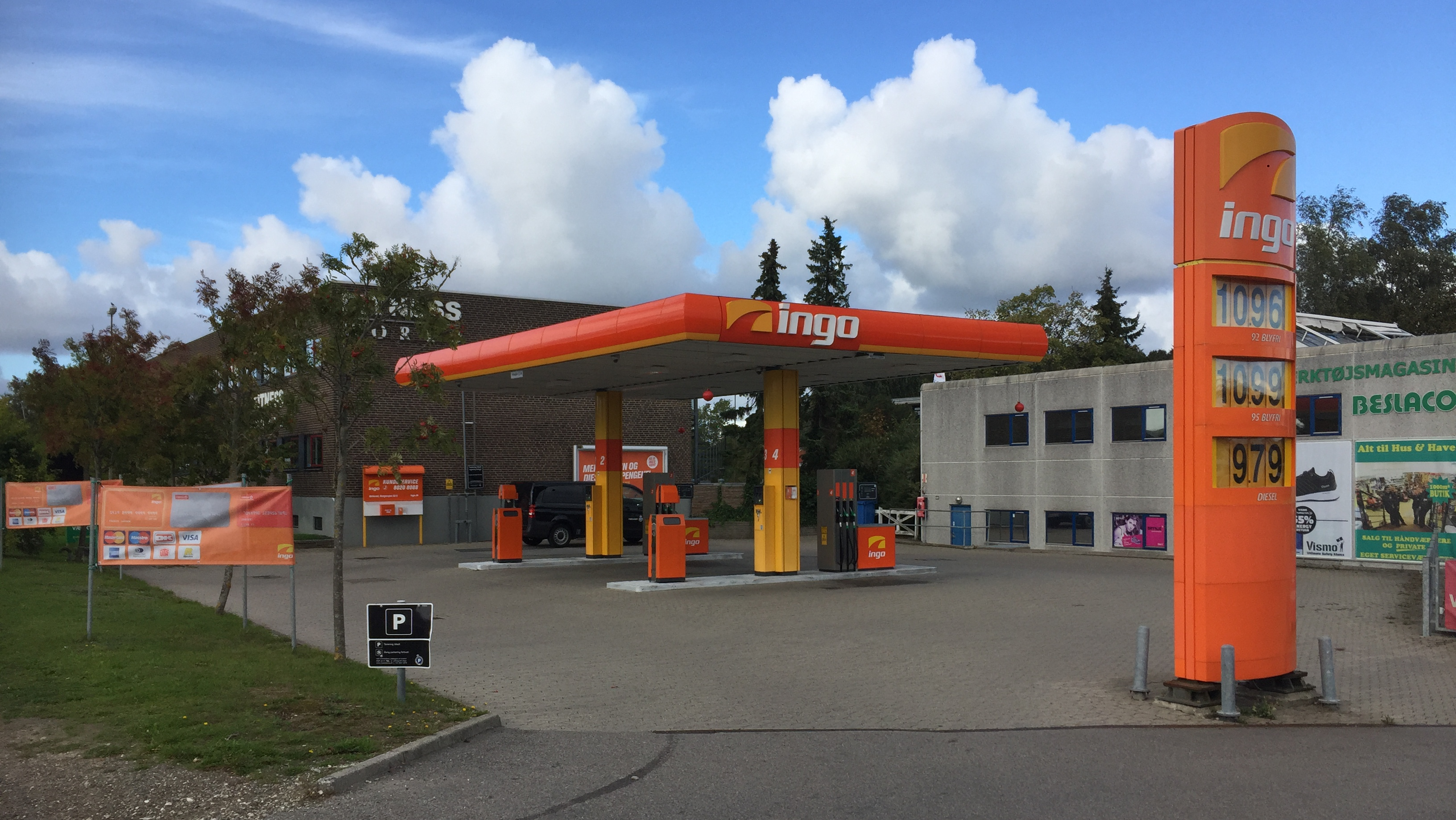
An Ingo station in Birkerød, Denmark

Ingo is a filling station brand owned by Circle K (formerly Statoil Fuel & Retail). Ingo filling stations are located in Denmark and Sweden. They were formerly named Jet, a brand name of ConocoPhillips. ConocoPhillips sold the stations in Denmark and Sweden in 2007 to Statoil. The downstream operation of Statoil was demerged from Statoil in the year 2010 and named Statoil Fuel & Retail. Statoil and Statoil Fuel & Retail were allowed to license the brand name Jet, but introduced a new name, Ingo, for them in 2014.
