= Mark Lashier =

American businessman

Mark Lashier is an American businessman, and the CEO of Phillips 66 since July 2022.

In April 2022, it was announced that Lashier, COO, would succeed Greg Garland as CEO of Phillips 66 in July 2022, with Garland becoming chairman.
