= 2015 United Steel Workers Oil Refinery strike =

Labor dispute in the United States

On February 1, 2015, United Steelworkers (USW) announced that "more than 5,200 USW oil workers at 11 refineries in California, Indiana, Kentucky, Ohio, Texas and Washington are on strike against the industry’s unfair labor practices". The list of charges alleged by NSW filed with the NLRB included: bad-faith bargaining over the companies’ refusal to negotiate over mandatory subjects, impeded bargaining for the companies’ undue delays in providing information, threatening workers if they join the ULP strike and others. As of March 3, 2015, about 6,550 workers were on strike at 15 plants, including 12 refineries with a fifth of U.S. capacity. It was the first time since 1982 that U.S. oil workers have walked off their jobs to protest working conditions. The National Oil Bargaining talks began in 1965 and are part of the U.S. oil industry's Pattern bargaining process.

== Refineries (and plants) ==
The USW announced a strike on February 1, 2015, at the following refineries:

- Houston Refinery (Lyondell), Houston, Texas
- Galveston Bay Refinery (Marathon Petroleum Company), Texas City, Texas
- Texas City Refinery (Marathon Petroleum Company), Texas City, Texas
- Catlettsburg Refinery (Marathon Petroleum Company), Catlettsburg, Kentucky
- Shell Deer Park Chemical Plant (Shell Oil Company), Deer Park, Texas.
- Deer Park Refinery (Shell Oil Company), Deer Park, Texas
- Tesoro Anacortes Refinery (Tesoro), Anacortes, Washington
- Carson Refinery (Tesoro), Carson, California
- Golden Eagle Refinery (Tesoro), Martinez, California

The strike was expanded on February 6, 2015, when workers at BP Plc-operated refineries in Indiana and Ohio were told to begin a work stoppage the following day:

- Whiting Refinery (BP), Whiting, Indiana
- Toledo Refinery (BP/Husky Oil), Toledo, Ohio

In a text message (Saturday morning; date TBD), the USW announced plans to expand the strike to Motiva facilities at Convent, La., and Norco, Louisiana, and to the Shell Chemical Plant at Norco.

- Convent Refinery (Motiva Enterprises), Convent, Louisiana
- Norco Refinery (Motiva Enterprises), Norco, Louisiana
- Shell Chemical Plant (Motiva Enterprises), Norco, Louisiana

The U.S. refinery strike widened on February 20, 2015, with workers at the nation's largest refinery walking off jobs. Shortly after talks between union and oil company representatives ended on the night of the 20th, the union notified Motiva Enterprises of a strike by its members at the company's 600,250-barrel-per-day (bpd) refinery in Port Arthur, Texas.

- Port Arthur Refinery (Motiva Enterprises), Port Arthur, Texas

== Replacement and returning workers ==
Shell alleged (according to a letter to employees from Aamir Farid, VP Manufacturing, Americas) that it has been training “relief employees” to operate its Deer Park refinery as well as its Norco chemical plant in Louisiana. By March 3, 2015, up to 180 employees, out of 800, at Royal Dutch Shell Plc's Deer Park, Texas, refinery decided to return to work.
