= Jet (brand) =

British fuel station chain owned by American Philips 66

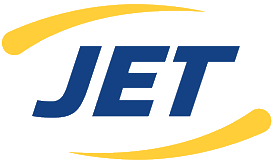

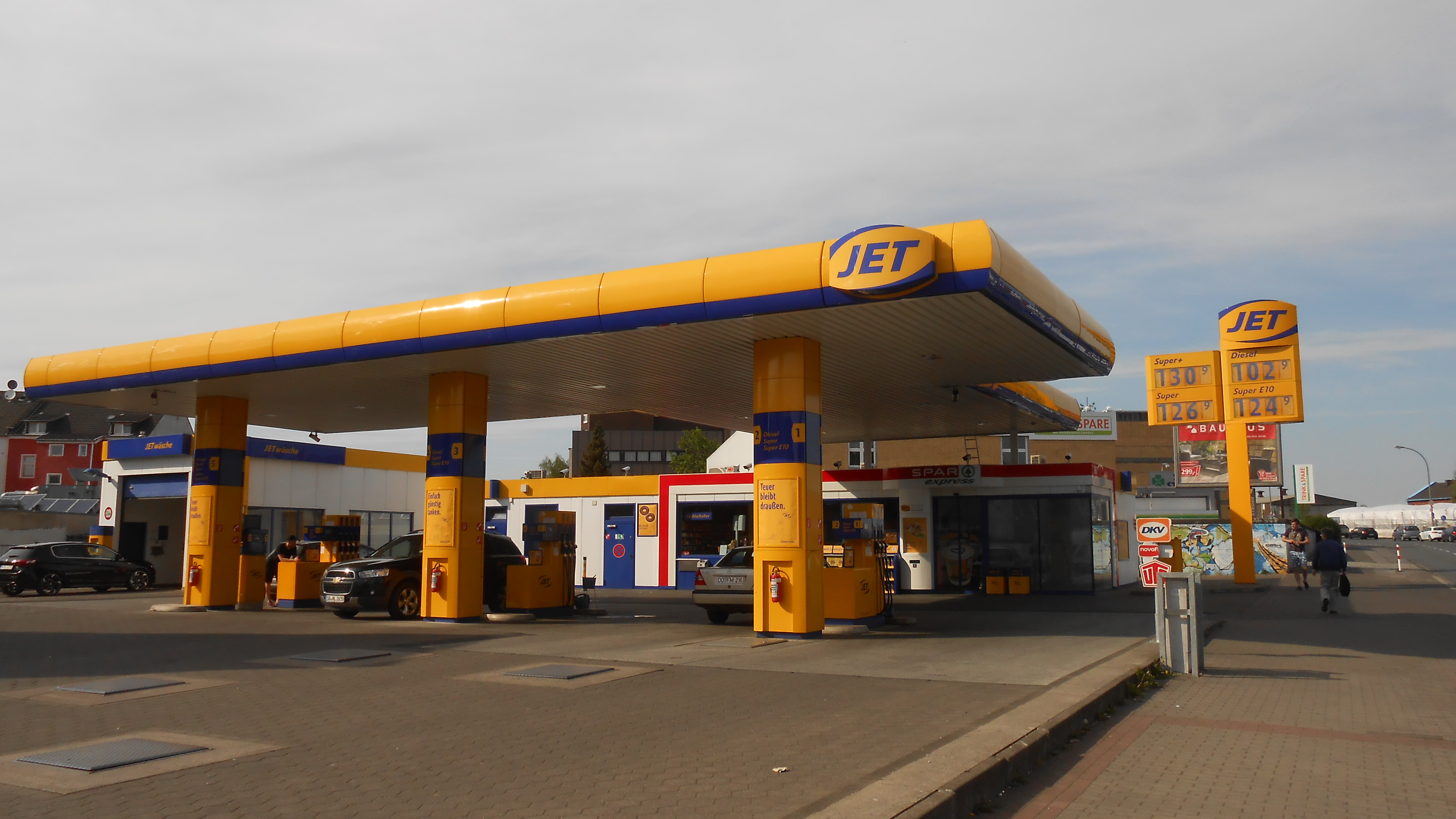
- A Jet filling station in Dortmund, Germany, May 2016
- Product type: Filling stations
- Current owner: Phillips 66
- Country: United Kingdom
- Introduced: 1954; 72 years ago
- Related brands: Conoco (Eastern U.S.); Phillips 66 (Eastern U.S.); 76 (Western U.S.)
- Markets: Austria, Germany, United Kingdom
- Previous owners: Jet Petroleum (1953–1961); Continental Oil Company (1961-1981); DuPont (1981–1998); Continental Oil Company (1998–2002); ConocoPhillips (2002–2012)
- Tagline: Energy for tomorrow
- Website: jetlocal.co.uk

Jet (styled JET) is a European brand of filling stations, which is owned by American-based conglomerate Phillips 66. Jet filling stations are located in Austria, Germany and the United Kingdom. The brand previously had a presence in other European countries and Thailand.

== History ==
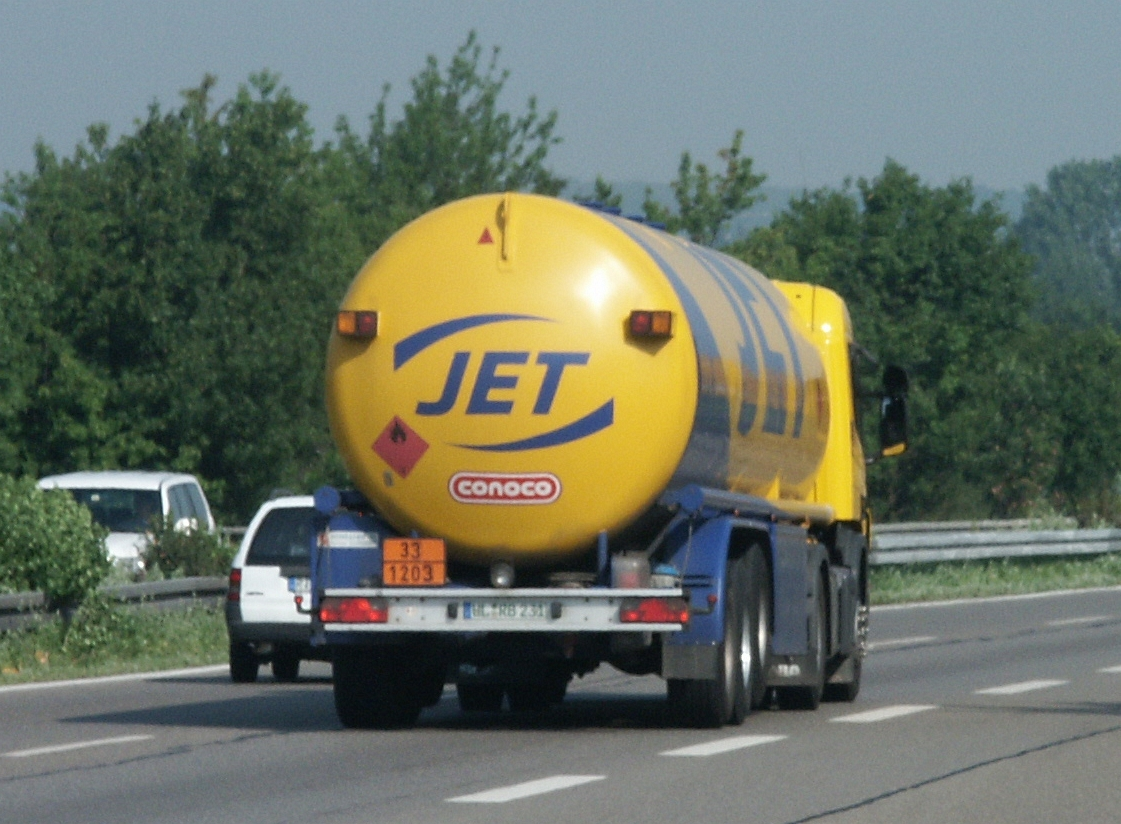
Jet tanker truck

Bill Roberts first used the brand name “Jet” for his future petrol station company in 1953 in Rotherham in the English county of Yorkshire. The name came from the row of letters on the number plate of his first tanker: JET 855. Robert's first petrol station was a small station on private property and was inexpensive to operate because no service other than refuelling was offered.

Jet Petroleum was formed in 1954 by Bill Roberts. Conoco acquired Jet in 1961.

In the 1960s, the Jet brand was introduced in Germany by the American oil multinational Conoco. By the mid-1980s, shortly after Conoco's acquisition by the US chemical group DuPont, Jet filling stations already controlled around 5% of the German fuel market. This was largely driven by a niche strategy where Jet positioned itself as a brand offering quality fuel at competitive prices, effectively occupying the space between major brands and independent stations.

The Jet service station network in Ireland was acquired by Statoil in 1996. Maxol acquired 80 Jet/Statoil-branded stations as a condition of the acquisition.

Parent company Conoco merged with Phillips Petroleum in 2002 to form ConocoPhillips.

In 2006, ConocoPhillips sold its 377 stations in Belgium, the Czech Republic, Finland, Hungary, Poland and Slovakia to its Russian affiliate, Lukoil. In return, ConocoPhillips received a 20% stake in Lukoil, which was gradually sold again until 2012. The rebranding of the Jet gas stations to Lukoil took place by 2009.

In April 2007, ConocoPhillips announced the sale of its 147 Jet stations in Thailand to PTT for $275 million.

In September 2007, Statoil also acquired the stations in Denmark, Norway and Sweden; however, they continued to use the Jet brand name. In 2014 the stations in Denmark and Sweden were renamed Ingo. The brand has not been present in Norway since around 2010.

ConocoPhillips spun off downstream assets to form Phillips 66, which included the Jet service station brand.
