= Tiendas Extra =

Mexican convenience store chain

Tiendas Extra, S.A. de C.V.
- Company type: Subsidiary
- Industry: Convenience stores
- Founded: 1993
- Headquarters: Mexico City, Mexico
- Parent: Grupo Modelo
- Website: http://www.extra.com.mx

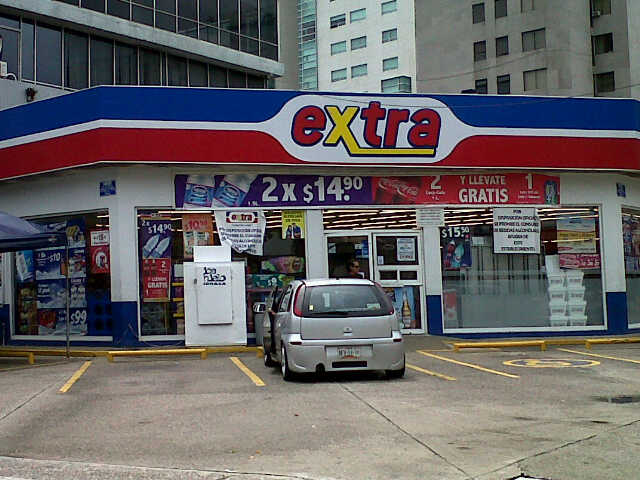
Extra store in Acapulco, Guerrero

Extra was a Mexican convenience store chain owned by Grupo Modelo, which started operations in 1993. In 2007 the chain closed 650 stores and in 2009 started another restructuring plan. It competes fiercely with OXXO from Femsa, 7-Eleven from Casa Chapa, SuperCity from Soriana and Circle K from Alimentation Couche-Tard. The point of sale is provided by IBM. In 2014, Grupo Modelo, a brewery owned by AB InBev, sold its Extra stores to Couche-Tard.

== Gallery ==
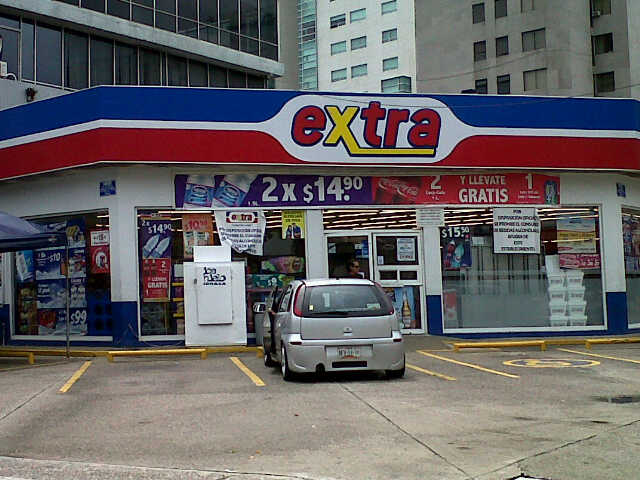
Extra in Acapulco

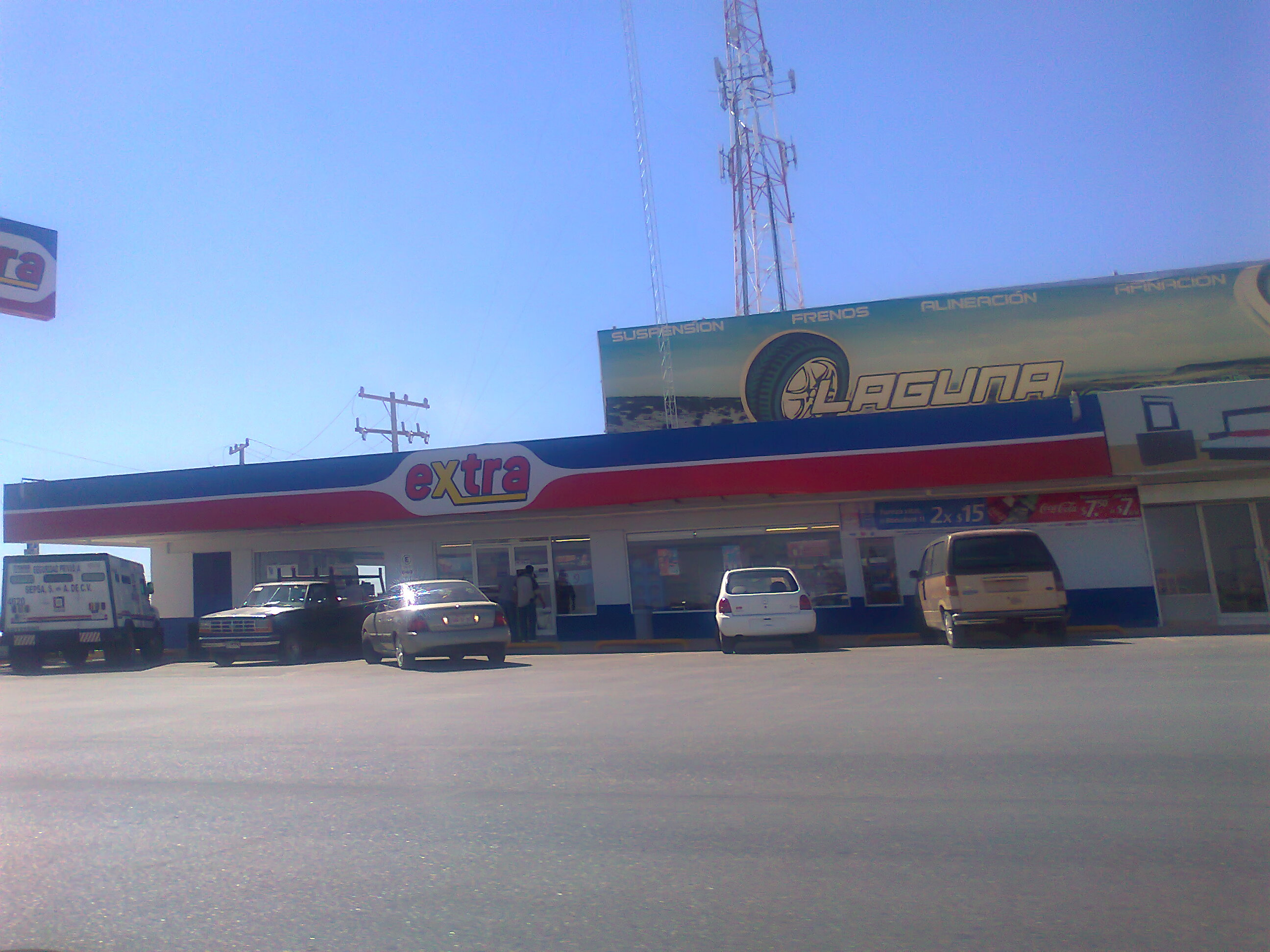
Extra in Durango
