= 76 (gas station) =

American fuel station chain owned by Phillips 66

- 76 gas station logo
- Product type: Service stations
- Current owner: Phillips 66 (since 2012)
- Introduced: 1932; 94 years ago (as Union 76)
- Related brands: Conoco (Eastern U.S.); Phillips 66 (Eastern U.S.); Jet (Europe)
- Markets: United States
- Previous owners: Unocal (1932–1997); Tosco (1997–2001); Phillips Petroleum (2001–2002); ConocoPhillips (2002–2012)
- Tagline: We're on the driver's side
- Website: 76.com

76 (formerly known as Union 76) is a chain of gas stations located within the United States. It was created by Unocal in 1932 and divested in 1997. The 76 brand is owned by Phillips 66 since 2012.

== History ==
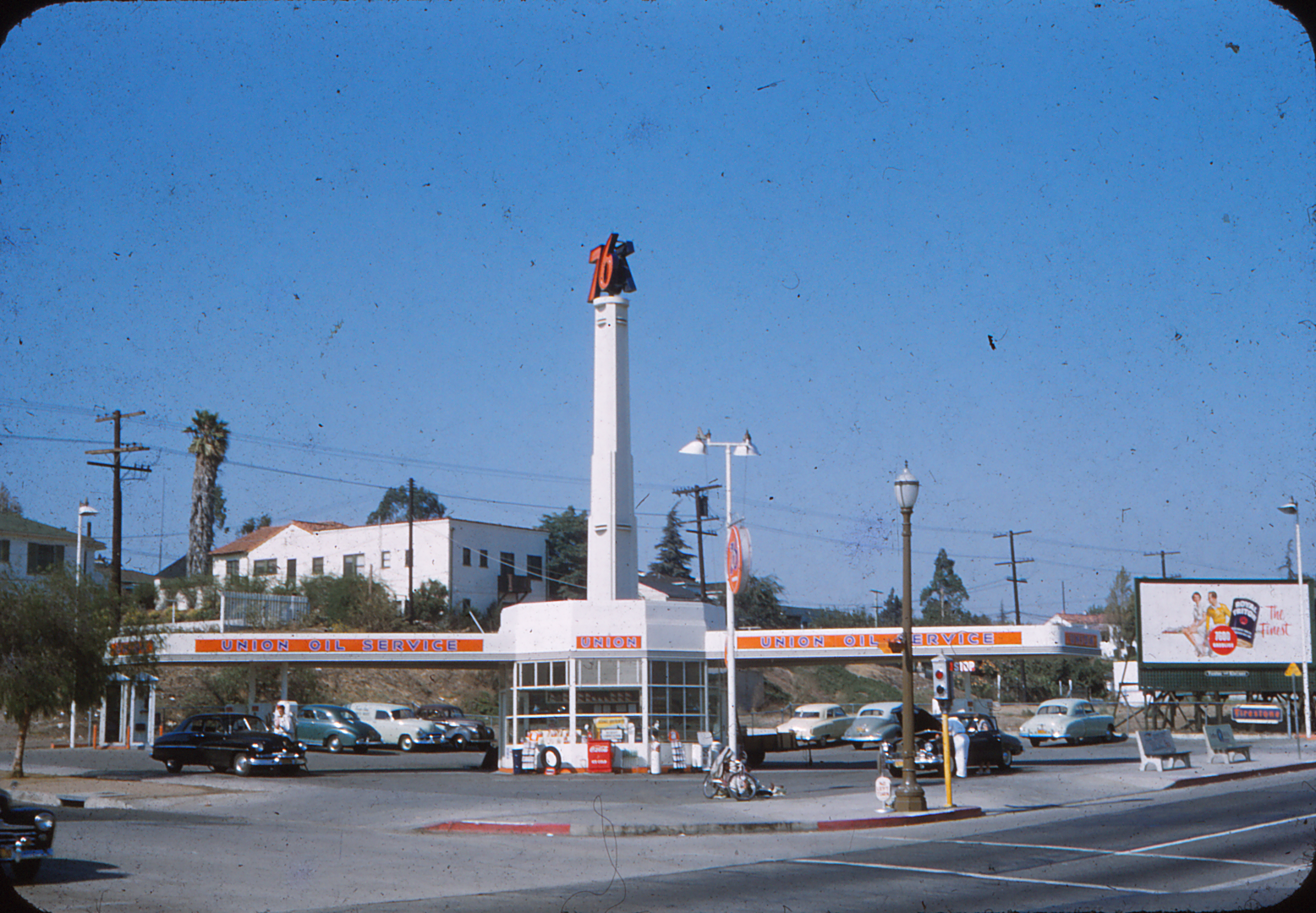
76 station in Southern California, c. 1950s

The Union Oil Company of California (later known as Unocal) introduced the Union 76 brand to its existing Union Oil service stations in 1932. After expanding along the West Coast, the Union 76 brand expanded to the Midwest and Southeast through the acquisition of Pure Oil in 1965.

In 1989, Unocal began to gradually exit the Midwest and Eastern markets by forming a joint venture with PDVSA, called Uno-Ven, in which Unocal contributed its Midwest refining and marketing assets. Unocal sold its interest in Uno-Ven to PDVSA in 1997 and PDVSA rebranded the Midwestern and Eastern Union 76 stations to its Citgo brand.

In 1997, Unocal also sold its remaining refining and marketing operations in the western United States and the rights to the Union 76 brand for use in refining and marketing operations to Tosco. Four years later, Phillips Petroleum purchased Tosco along with the 76 brand in 2001. Phillips merged with Conoco the following year to form ConocoPhillips.

In 2012, ConocoPhillips divested its refining, distribution and marketing business, which included the 76 brand, by forming Phillips 66.

In 2016, Saudi Aramco-owned Motiva Enterprises signed a deal with Phillips 66 Company which would allow Motiva to use the 76 brand on some of its stations in its 26 eastern and Gulf Coast states operating territory. By 2017, the 76 brand was reintroduced into New York, Georgia, Texas, Tennessee, and New Jersey.

== Marketing ==
76, Conoco, and Phillips 66 market their gasoline under the PROclean brand name. The previous brand name for their gasoline was Propower. 76 gasoline stopped being marketed under the Propower name after the termination of the commercial relationship between NASCAR and 76 after the end of the 2003 season, when the firm discontinued all motorsport fuels. As of October 2004, PROclean brand fuel was included on the list of fuels recognized as "Top Tier".

In the 1970s and 1980s, the company used the slogan "Go With the Spirit...the Spirit of '76." This was later shortened to "Get the Spirit". Their slogan is "We're on the driver's side" since 2009.

=== The orange ball ===
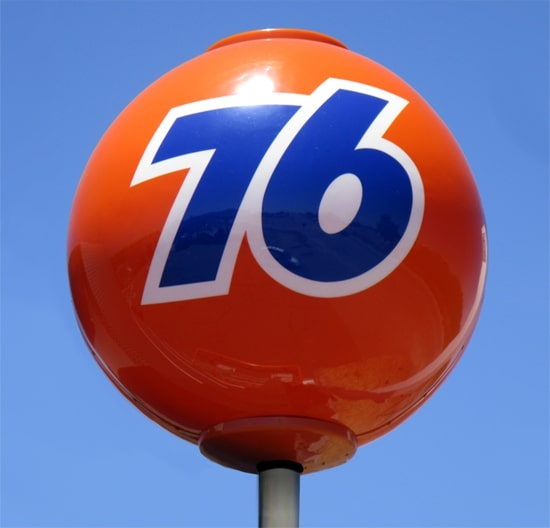
Close image of the 76 ball

Union Oil, for many years based in El Segundo, California, introduced "76" gasoline in 1932. The name referred to the 1776 United States Declaration of Independence, and was also the octane rating of the gasoline in 1932.

76 signs are orange balls with a "76" legend in blue. During the 1960s and '70s, most stations had the 76 ball rotate when the signs were illuminated. The first sign was designed in 1962 by advertising creative director Ray Pedersen for the Seattle World's Fair.

In 2005, new corporate owners ConocoPhillips began a rebranding campaign to unify the design elements of each of the merged brands (76, Phillips, and Conoco), which included replacing the orange-ball signs with monument-style signs (flat disk style signs) in the red-orange and blue color scheme. In response to negative publicity generated by a grassroots "Save The 76 Ball" campaign, ConocoPhillips reversed this decision in January 2007, and agreed to donate several classic orange 76 balls to museums and to erect approximately 100 balls in the new red-orange and blue color scheme.

Until the end of 2003, 76 "spotters" balls were located at the Daytona International Speedway and other NASCAR tracks. They had portholes that could hold people inside. One of these was placed in the second story of the NASCAR Hall of Fame in Charlotte. Another was given to the owner of The Brumos Collection in Jacksonville, Florida, and sits prominently on display outside the front grounds. Dale Earnhardt Jr. acquired the 76 ball from North Wilkesboro Speedway and displays it with a vintage 76 gas station on his "Whiskey River" property. Similar balls were near pit entrances at most NASCAR circuits until the sponsorship ended.

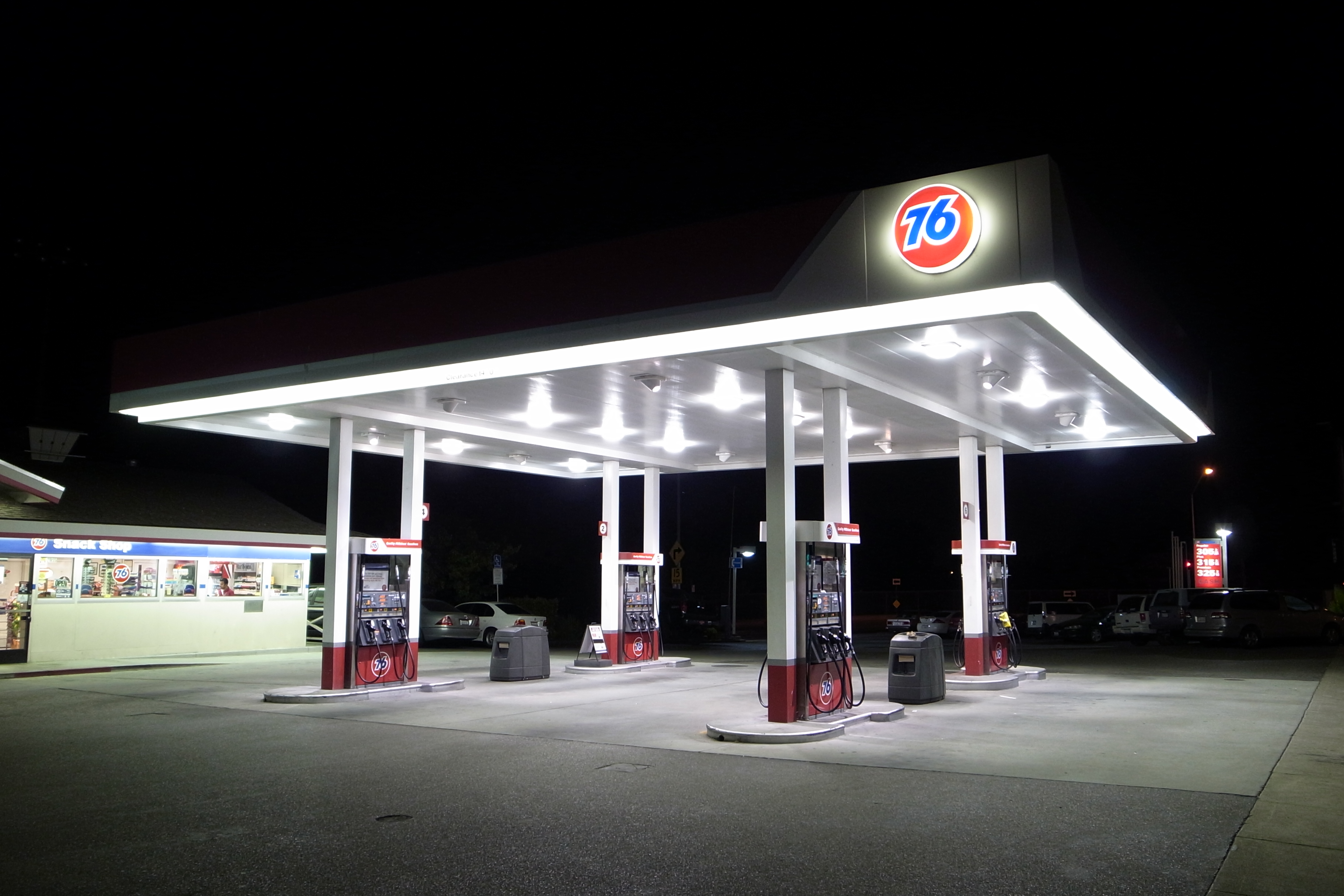
76 Gas station at night

The 76 ball is also a landmark that sits atop Dodger Stadium in Los Angeles, where the only gas station on the premises of a Major League ballpark is visible from the park beyond the outfield stands. The gas station is no longer active and has been converted into an event space. 76 ball logos also adorn the baseball field's on-deck circles. Union Oil was a longtime sponsor of the Dodgers baseball team, beginning with their relocation to Los Angeles from Brooklyn in 1958. The sponsorship by the 76 brand continues to this day.

In 1967, Union 76 distributed tens of millions of small orange foam balls bearing the 76 logo, intended for use on car radio antennas.

In recent years, 76 has appeared in certain areas in the eastern United States, as part of a licensing deal with Motiva Enterprises. Since 2013, they have returned to the orange ball imagery as part of the "Experience 76" program.

Some stations with the full orange ball sign place special hoods over them for Halloween to make them look like jack-o'-lanterns.

== See also ==
- List of automotive fuel brands
