= Statoil Fuel & Retail =

Norwegian petrol station chain

- Company type: Subsidiary
- Industry: Petroleum, Retail
- Predecessor: Statoil ASA
- Founded: 2010; 16 years ago
- Defunct: 2016
- Fate: Acquired by Alimentation Couche-Tard and rebranded as Circle K
- Headquarters: Oslo, Norway
- Number of locations: 2,239 stations
- Area served: Northern Europe
- Revenue: ▲NOK 73.7 billion (2011)
- Number of employees: 17,500 (2014)
- Parent: Alimentation Couche-Tard
- Website: www.statoilfuelretail.com

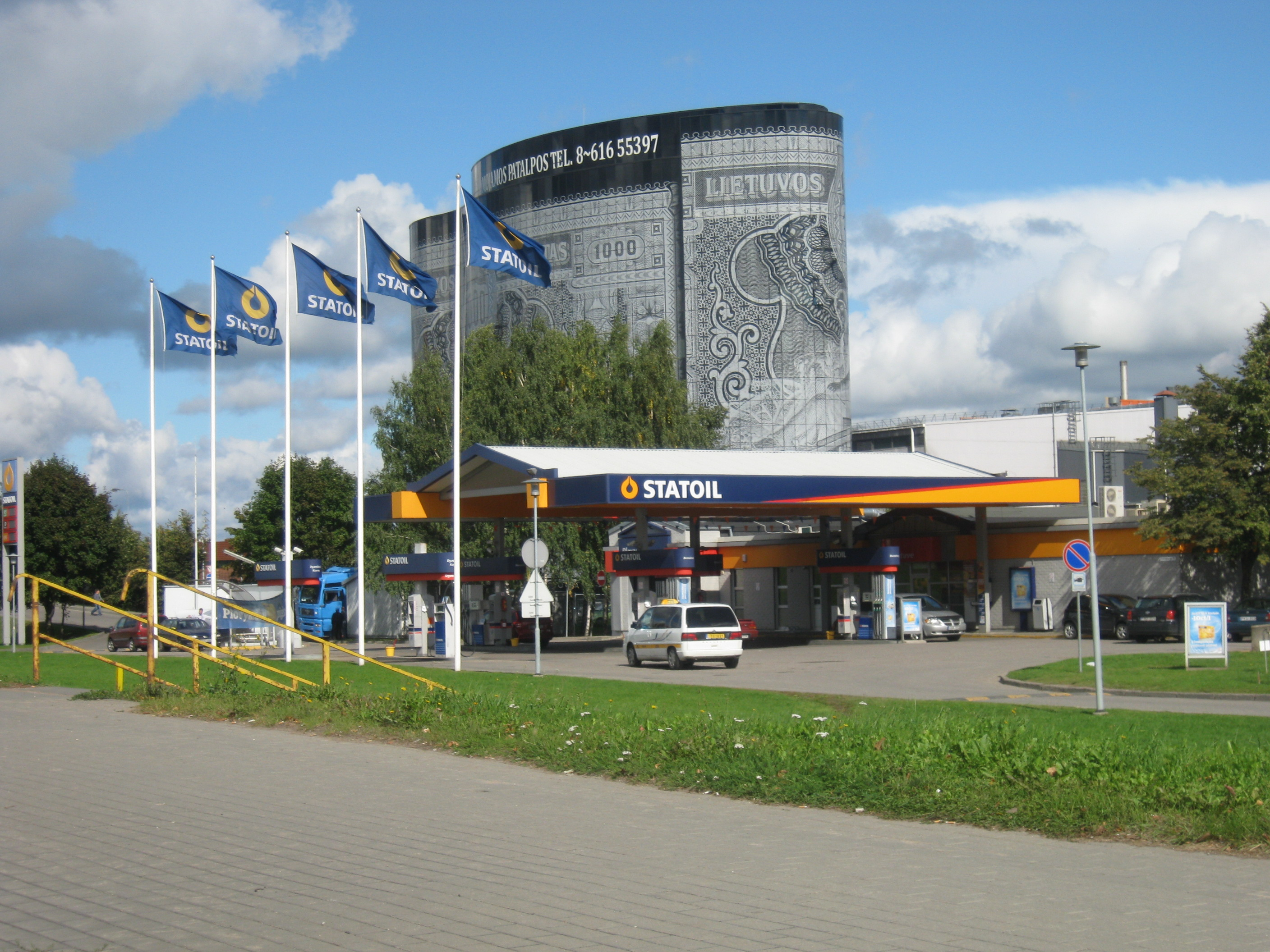
Statoil in Lithuania

Statoil Fuel & Retail was a Norwegian petrol station chain, formed by the 2010 separation of the downstream business of Statoil ASA into a separate listed company.

The company had 2,300 fuel retail stations in Scandinavia, Poland, the Baltic countries and Russia as well as significant lubricants and aviation fuel operations. It was listed as a separate company on the Oslo Stock Exchange on October 22, 2010.

On 18 April 2012 it was announced that Alimentation Couche-Tard would buy Statoil Fuel & Retail for US$2.8 billion and it would become a wholly owned indirect subsidiary of Couche-Tard. The deal included the right to use the "Statoil" brand for the stations until 30 September 2019.

In September 2014, the jet fuel business of Statoil Fuel & Retail was sold to BP for an undisclosed amount.

On 22 September 2015 it was announced that the "Statoil" branding would be phased out, and replaced by Circle K as part of a global rebranding scheme involving all Couche Tard-owned retailers.

In 2016, Couche-Tard decided to merge Circle K and Statoil Fuel & Retail into the Circle K brand.

== Brands and geographic presence ==
Statoil Fuel & Retail was presented in eight countries (2010):

Country	"Statoil" branded stations	"Statoil" branded stations after merge with Alimentation Couche-Tard	"1-2-3" branded stations	Ingo branded stations	Total number of "Statoil" stations before merger	Remark
Denmark	214 (Merged in 2016)	0	71	24	309	Manager: Fuchs Petrolub from 2015
Estonia	46 (Merged in 2017)	0	6	-	52	Manager: Fuchs Petrolub from 2015
Latvia	74 (Merged from 2017 till 2018)	0	5	-	79	Manager: Fuchs Petrolub from 2015
Lithuania	63 (Merged from 2017 till 2018)	0	13	-	77	Manager: Fuchs Petrolub from 2015
Norway	427 (Merged from 2015 till 2016)	1(data from April 6, 2017)	145	-	572	Manager: Fuchs Petrolub from 2015
Poland	249 (Merged in 2016)	0	48	-	297	
Russia	19 (Merged in 2018)	19	-	-	19	
Sweden	682 (Merged from 2015 till 2016)	0	-	123	805	Manager: Fuchs Petrolub from 2015
