= Bill Roberts (businessman) =

British businessman

John William Roberts (1898–1962) was a British businessman from Yorkshire, who was the founder of the JET brand of petrol.

== Early life ==
He was born in Halifax. From the age of eleven he was working part-time in the mills. By the age of twelve he was working full-time. He came from a family of seven children.

He served in the First World War.

== Career ==
Before the Second World War, he worked for Trent Oil Products, a chemical company in north Lincolnshire, and on Long Lane in Huddersfield.

=== JET ===
He started Jet Petroleum Ltd in October 1953. Its first company address was 23 John William Street in Huddersfield. His first tanker had the registration JET 855. In 1961 Jet was bought by Conoco for £12.5m.

== Personal life ==
When he founded JET, he lived on Vicarage Gardens in Scunthorpe.
