= Port Arthur Refinery =

Large American refinery

Motiva refinery
- Location of the Port Arthur Refinery in Port Arthur, United States
- Location: Port Arthur, Texas, Texas, United States; 29°53′6″N 93°57′45″W

Refinery details
- Owner: Saudi Aramco
- Opened: 1902
- Capacity: 720,000 barrels per day (114,000 m^{3}/d)
- No. of employees: 1,450

The Motiva refinery is an oil refinery located in Port Arthur, Texas. It is the largest oil refinery in the United States.

The first processing units of the Port Arthur Refinery were constructed in 1902 by the Texas Company, later Texaco. The roots of this refinery can be traced to the Spindletop oil boom near Beaumont, Texas. It came into operation in 1903. Port Arthur is in eastern Texas on the Gulf of Mexico. At certain points during its lifespan, it was considered the flagship refinery of Texaco.

On January 1, 1989, Saudi Refining, Inc. purchased 50% of the Port Arthur refinery (and two others) from Texaco to form a joint venture with Texaco called Star Enterprise. In 2001, Texaco was purchased by Chevron. Shortly thereafter Chevron's interest in this refinery (and two others) was sold to Shell on February 13, 2002. This new joint venture was called Motiva Enterprises LLC. Until 2017, the Motiva Port Arthur Refinery was a joint venture with a 50% ownership between Shell Oil Products US and Saudi Refining Inc. Shell Oil Products is part of Royal Dutch Shell. Saudi Refining is part of Saudi Aramco. Approximately 1,200 people are employed at the site.

In March 2016, the joint venture between Shell and Saudi Aramco was set on course to dissolve, and this refinery is now controlled by Saudi Aramco effective May 1, 2017.

The completion of the expansion of the Port Arthur Refinery, officially celebrated on 31 May 2012, increased its crude oil capacity to 600,000 barrels per day – making it the largest refinery in the US. The expansion added 325,000 barrels per day of capacity. As of May 2016 the refinery has reached a maximum capacity of 630,000 barrels per day.

This refinery can process a wide range of crude inputs, including tight oil and heavy, sour, and acid crudes. Initially, the crude it processed came from Saudi Arabia, but it has since expanded to work with other countries, based on where the oil is available. The refinery supplies gasoline, diesel, aviation fuels, and high quality base oils to customers in the US.

== 2015 United Steelworkers strike ==
On February 1, 2015 United Steelworks union members went on strike after the union rejected oil producers' (like Shell and ExxonMobil) fifth offer. This event was the first large-scale walkout in the industry in 35 years. Union representatives called on oil companies to improve safety in (an) enforceable way. As a result, for the duration of the strike, Port Arthur Refinery was forced to implement the facility's strike contingency plan, calling for nonunion operators to operate the facility while negotiations continued. Nevertheless, according to local sources, the plant was forced to run at 50% capacity, including several units that were shut down for repairs. In mid-March 2015, representatives from both sides reached a four-year national agreement that ended the country-wide strike.

== 2017 Saudi Arabia acquisition ==
Four years after Port Arthur underwent its $10 billion expansion, making the facility the biggest producer of gasoline, diesel and other petroleum products in the United States, Saudi Arabia-based Saudi Aramco took over as sole owner of the facility. News organizations had reported that Shell and Aramco's joint business venture began to unravel shortly after the multi-billion dollar facility expansion. Increases in operating costs subsequent to the expansion combined with the 2015 workers strike damaged relations between these oil giants beyond repair.

As per the dissolution agreement with Shell, Saudi Aramco retained Motiva's name, Port Arthur refinery, and 24 distribution terminals. In Texas, under the agreement, Aramco has the exclusive right to use the Shell brand on gasoline and diesel sales. In return, Shell retained two Louisiana refineries (Convent and Norco), eleven distribution terminals, and received a $2.2 billion balancing payment. Energy and Middle East experts speculated that, through acquiring Port Arthur Refinery, Saudi Aramco would maintain a dominant presence on the Gulf of Mexico coast.

== Effects on public health ==
A study in the Journal of Occupational Medicine found that workers at Port Arthur refineries were more likely to die from diseases like brain cancer, stomach cancer, leukemia, and other forms of cancer. Furthermore, nonwhite workers were more likely to die at younger ages than white workers. Nonwhite workers also experienced higher proportionate mortality ratios than their white counterparts with regards to deaths from all cancers, and deaths from accidents, suicide, or homicide. White workers had a higher proportionate mortality ratio for prostate cancer than nonwhite workers. However, a different study from the same journal followed a cohort of workers at the Port Arthur refinery and found conflicting evidence that said overall, the workers did not suffer from excess mortality rates compared to other Texas residents.

A study found approximately 36% higher levels of lead in Port Arthur residents compared to Hanover, New Hampshire residents.

A study by the University of Texas Medical Branch at Galveston indicates that Port Arthur residents located around the refinery are four times more likely than Galveston residents to have heart and respiratory conditions, nervous system and skin disorders, headaches and muscle aches, and ear, nose, and throat ailments.

Black residents in the area suffer the most. According to the Texas Cancer Registry, black Jefferson county residents have cancer rates 15% higher than that of their white counterparts, largely due to black communities living closer to Jefferson county's refineries such as Port Arthur than white communities.

== Environmental record ==
The Motiva Port Arthur refinery released over 15.5 million pounds of criteria pollutants in 2003, making it one of the largest polluters in the area.

The facility releases six airborne chemicals in a residential area that exceeded the Health Effects Screening Levels and are linked to cancer growth and development, including benzene and chloroform.

Despite largely fulfilling the requirements of the Clean Air Act legislation, the refinery experiences a large number of flares and accidental releases that push the emissions levels over regulated amounts. Accidental releases in 2002 resulted in a total of 1,149,069 pounds of toxins put into the air. The refinery also released 8,000 pounds of sulfur dioxide in a flare release on April 7, 2002. An accidental release on April 14, 2003, resulted in the emission of 274,438 pounds of air contaminants into the surrounding environment; including 107,280 pounds of hexane and 37,538 pounds of pentane, both of which have severe human health impacts.

== Public opinion ==
=== Pro-refinery ===
In Port Arthur City, some community leaders and residents are supportive of the refinery's presence. Former Mayor Oscar Ortiz believes that Port Arthur's identity and well-being are linked with the refineries that inhabit it. He states, "If industry goes away, people might as well go away too because there'll be no money. That's the continued salvation of this city." Shell Co. underscores this sentiment by stating that its recent multi-billion dollar expansion was a boon for local economy, generating more than $17 billion in regional economic development. According to the oil giant, around 14,500 people worked on the expansion project at peak construction and more than 300 new permanent jobs were created.

Additionally, Port Arthur Refinery and its affiliates provide financial support to local community organizations.

=== Anti-refinery ===
Alternatively, some residents disagree with Port Arthur Refinery's local benefits. Concerns over pollution are acute in the local community. Edward Brooks II, a Port Arthur resident says, "They [the government] tell us about the emissions but they don’t do anything about it. They don’t care. Half the kids here need help breathing. A lot of them have breathing machines at home and at school." Additionally, majority of the populations around the refineries come from minority and socioeconomically disadvantaged background and lack resources to move to a less polluted area. However, local community leaders have found ways to find common ground with refinery representatives. Hilton Kelley, another Port Arthur resident, is a prominent leader in the campaign for restrictions on emissions and reparations for medical costs. His approach emphasizes the refineries' local economic importance, but calls on representatives to "clean up their act". After much community organizing and campaigning, Kelley negotiated a $2 million Community Enhancement Agreement with Motiva, to improve housing, social opportunities, and community programs. Kelley sits on the board of directors.

== Incidents ==
Motiva announced plans to lay off 10 percent of its workforce by September 2020 in response to the coronavirus-driven oil bust. Also in August 2020, Motiva Enterprises announced that in preparation for Hurricane Laura they would temporarily halt operations. However, by 2022, they were planning expansion again.

=== Lawsuits ===
A lawsuit was filed against Motiva Enterprises LLC in 2008 for their pollution of the Alligator Bayou next to the Port Arthur Refinery. The lawsuit yielded a settlement of $1,200,000 for the plaintiffs, the collective group of Texas General Land Office ("GLO"), the Texas Parks and Wildlife Department ("TPWD"), and the Texas Commission on Environmental Quality ("TCEQ") known as the "Trustees".[5]

In January 2015 the US EPA filed a civil lawsuit against Motiva's parent company, Equilon Enterprises, for violations of the Clean Air Act at its many oil refineries, including its Port Arthur facility. The violations included elevated levels of ethanol in gasoline, violations of the gasoline volatility and sulfur standards, violations of the diesel sulfur standards, and numerous recordkeeping, reporting, sampling and testing violations. Equilon Enterprises was required to pay a civil penalty of $900,000.[10]

=== Accidents ===
Over the course of 42 years, there have been at least five documented cases of lethal accidents at this refinery. Some accidents that have killed workers include storage tank explosions, a train accident, a bulldozer malfunction, and a falling object.[1][2][3][4][7]

There have also been at least four documented cases of non-lethal explosions or fires breaking out at the refinery. On the morning of December 8, 2009 an accident caused an explosion in the hydrogen unit run by Praxair Inc. No one was injured.[6] In early June 2012, after two fires erupted and a heater broke, workers noticed that caustic vapors had leaked out of a tank and caused widespread accelerated corrosion of pipes and equipment.[8] In late July 2015, a catalytic reformer caught fire. No one was injured.[9]
