= DCP Midstream Partners =

American petroleum services company

DCP Midstream Partners, LP
- Company type: Private
- Industry: Petroleum industry
- Founded: 2005
- Defunct: 2023
- Fate: Acquired
- Successor: Phillips 66
- Headquarters: Denver, Colorado, United States
- Area served: United States
- Key people: Don Baldridge (Interim CEO)
- Products: Midstream services
- Owner: Phillips 66 and Enbridge
- Number of employees: 2,650 (2018)
- Website: www.dcpmidstream.com

DCP Midstream Partners was an American energy company that focused on midstream petroleum services (i.e. transportation and refinery). The majority of its shares were acquired by Phillips 66 in 2023 and the company has been controlled of Phillips 66 since then.

Prior to its acquisition it was a Fortune 500 company headquartered in Denver, Colorado.

== History ==
As a publicly traded partnership, the company did not have directors, officers, or employees of its own, but relied on its general partner to manage its operations.

As of 2015, the company had a total economic value of more than $6 billion and 628 employees provided support, making it one of the largest midstream petroleum services company in the United States.

In June 2023, Phillips 66 increased its ownership stake in DCP Midstream to 86% by acquiring all publicly listed stock from the New York Stock Exchange. The majority of remaining shares were held by Canadian energy company Enbridge.

== See also ==
- List of oilfield service companies
