= Circle K =

Canadian chain of convenience stores

Circle K Stores, Inc.

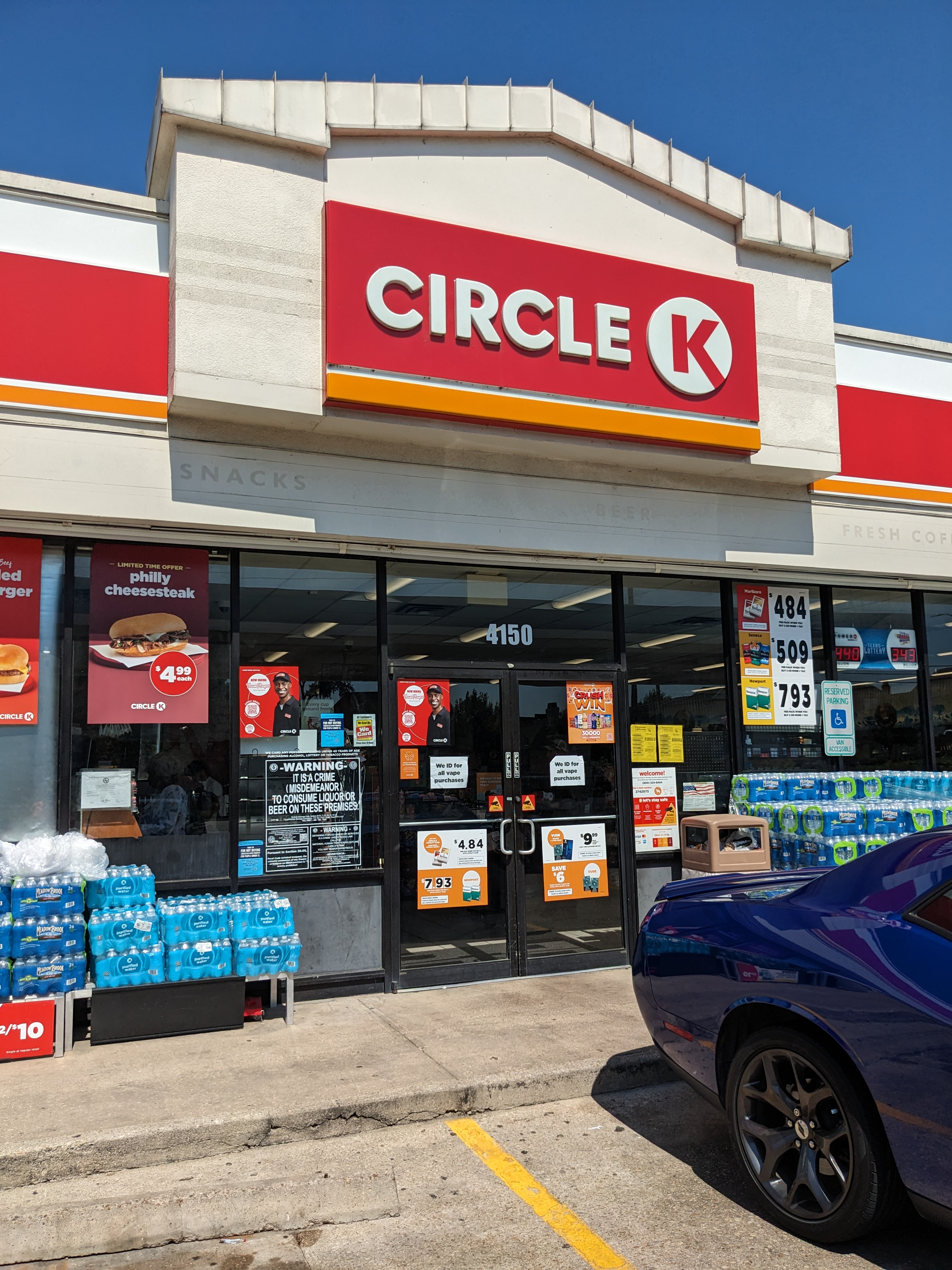
- A Circle K store in Fort Worth, Texas
- Type: Subsidiary
- Industry: Retail (convenience stores) Franchising
- Founded: El Paso, Texas, U.S. (1951; 75 years ago)
- Founder: Fred Hervey
- Headquarters: Tempe, Arizona, U.S.
- Number of locations: 15,000+
- Area served: Many countries and regions: Belgium; Bulgaria; Cambodia; Canada; China (Zhuhai, Hong Kong and Macau only); Costa Rica; Denmark; Egypt; Estonia; Germany; Guam; Honduras; Indonesia; Ireland; Latvia; Lithuania; Luxembourg; Malaysia; Mexico; Morocco; Netherlands; New Zealand; Norway; Philippines; Poland; Saudi Arabia; South Africa; Sweden; Taiwan; United Arab Emirates; United Kingdom (Northern Ireland only); United States; Vietnam
- Number of employees: 40,000+
- Parent: Alimentation Couche-Tard, Inc.
- Website: circlek.com

Circle K Stores, Inc. is a Canadian-American convenience store chain owned by the Canadian multinational operator Alimentation Couche-Tard, Inc., based in Laval, Quebec. Founded in 1951 in El Paso, Texas, the company filed for bankruptcy protection in 1990 and went through several owners, before being acquired by Alimentation Couche-Tard in 2003. As of February 2020, Circle K has 9,799 stores in North America, 2,697 stores in Europe, and an additional 2,380 stores operating under franchise agreements worldwide.

In 2015, Circle K unveiled a new logo and brand identity, and Couche-Tard announced that it would deploy the brand globally, including Canada (except Quebec, rebranding from the Mac's brand), Europe (rebranding from the Statoil brand), and the United States (rebranding from the Kangaroo Express brand and updating the existing Circle K brand).

== Overview ==
Since the 1980s, Circle K has been the largest chain of company-owned and operated (non-franchised) convenience stores in the United States. With 7,230 stores overall in the United States, Circle K is second to 7-Eleven's 9,348 stores (as of July 2019). As of February 2020, there are more than 14,800 stores with the Circle K brand worldwide.

Within the United States, Circle K owns and operates stores in 48 states (the two states without being Nebraska and Utah), with the largest concentration of stores found in Louisiana. Fuel is sold under various brands, with the Circle K and Shell brands as the most common. Other brands of fuel sold at Circle K stores include Valero, BP, Exxon, Marathon, Irving, Mobil, Esso and Phillips 66. Approximately 13% of stores worldwide do not sell fuel.

Circle K operates stores in the United States, Canada, Europe (the Nordics, Baltics, Poland, Russia and Ireland), Japan, and Hong Kong, and has franchises in Mexico (it partners with the Mexican stores "Tiendas Extra" created by Modelo Group), Cambodia, China, Egypt, Guam, Honduras, Indonesia, Jamaica, Macau, New Zealand, Saudi Arabia, South Africa, the United Arab Emirates and Vietnam. In Hong Kong and Macau, the stores are called OK in reference to the circle around the K. Circle K Hong Kong was founded in 1985 by Li & Fung Retailing (later Fung Retailing) as licensee of the name; however, it was sold back to Couche-Tard in 2020. Circle K had 387 franchised locations throughout Hong Kong as of May 2020.

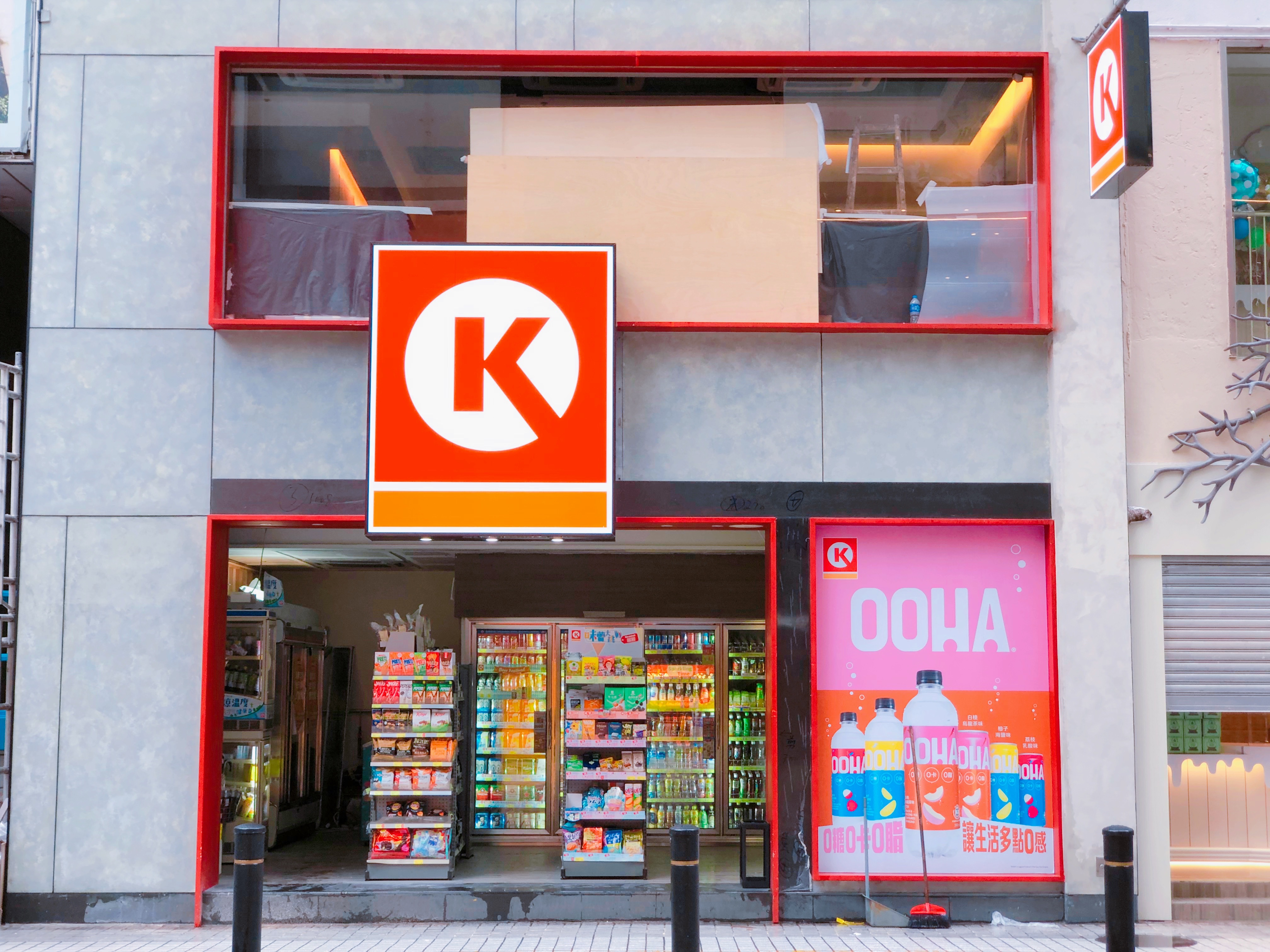
A Circle K located in Causeway Bay, Hong Kong

The Circle K brand entered the Canadian market in 2008, in connection with Couche-Tard's acquisition of Irving Oil's convenience store network. By 2019, more than 800 Mac's branded stores had been rebranded to Circle K throughout central and western Canada.

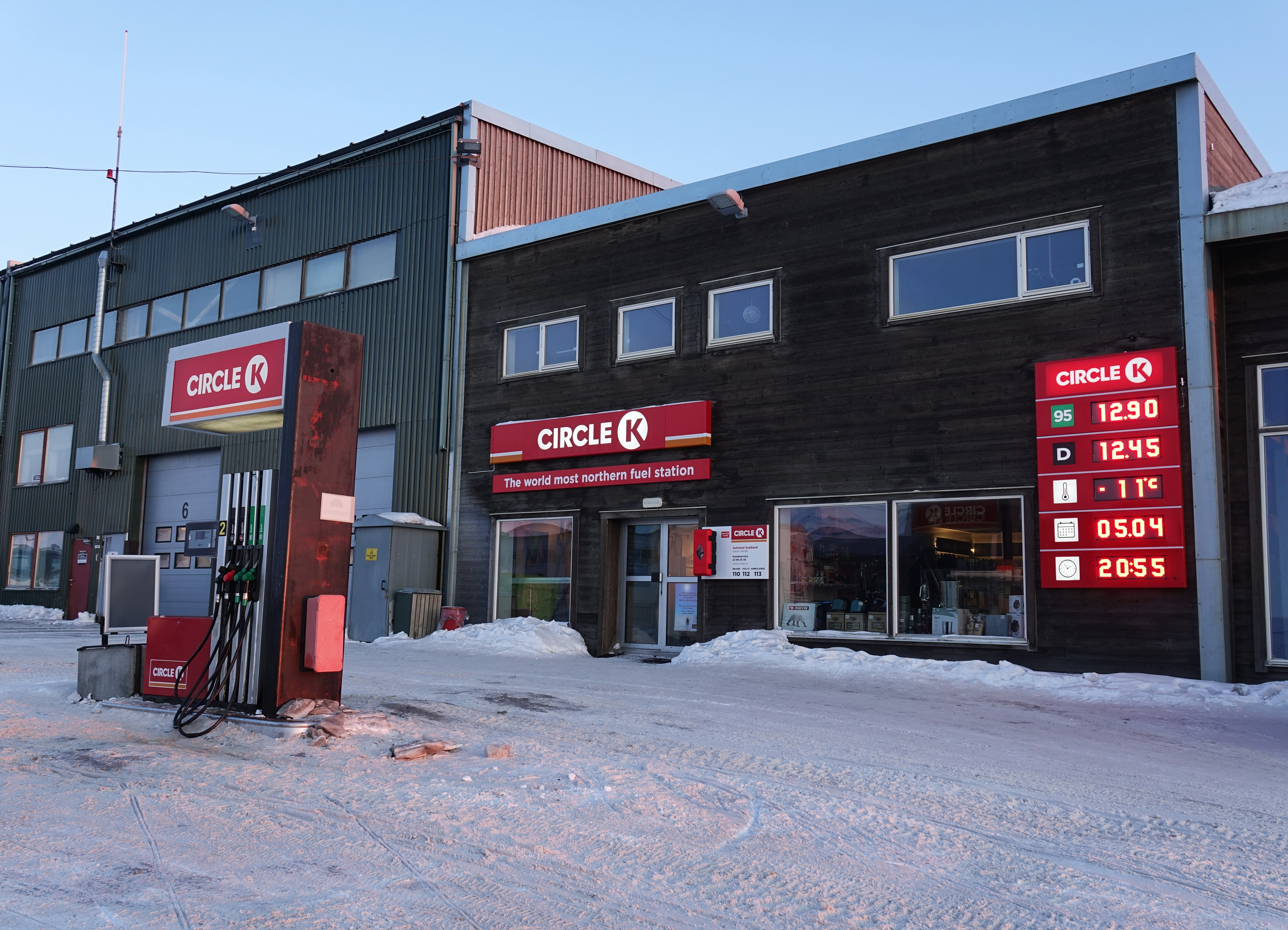
The world's most northern fuel station, in Longyearbyen, Norway

In September 2015, Couche-Tard announced that Circle K would become the worldwide brand of all of its convenience stores, replacing Mac's, Kangaroo Express, Statoil, and Holiday Stationstores brands (except the Couche-Tard brand in Quebec and the INGO brand in Europe). This global rebrand included the introduction of a new logo incorporating elements of its existing brands, improvements to its product offerings and technology, and investing in store-level improvements aimed at improving the customer experience. The rebranding occurred over the following five years; as of March 2020, all of Europe and 85% of North America had been updated with the Circle K brand and logo.

== History ==
The former Circle K logo. It can still be seen in the U.S., Canada, Hong Kong and Macau.

Entrepreneur Fred Hervey purchased three Kay's Food Stores, from Kay Misenheimer, in El Paso, Texas, in 1951. Hervey renamed the stores as "Circle K Food Stores, Inc." rather than "Kay." He grew the Circle K chain into neighboring New Mexico and Arizona, which has been the company's home base since 1957. (Hervey would go on to serve two terms as mayor of El Paso.)

By 1975, there were 1,000 Circle K stores across the U.S. In 1979, Circle K first expanded its reach into foreign markets via a licensing agreement which established the first Circle K stores in Japan by UNY. Until 2018, Circle K stores in Japan were run by the FamilyMart Company, that was named Circle K Sunkus Company until 2016 and was named Circle K Japan Company until 2004, which licensed the Circle K brand from Alimentation Couche-Tard. In 2018, all Circle K stores in Japan were converted to FamilyMart stores. In 1983, the number of stores increased to 2,180 with the purchase of the 960-store UtoteM chain in the western and southern United States.

Karl Eller, a prominent Phoenix, Arizona businessman, served as the company's CEO from 1983 to 1990. During that time, Eller built Circle K into the second largest convenience store operation and the largest publicly owned convenience store chain in the U.S. with 4,631 stores in 32 states and an additional 1,300 or so licensed or joint venture stores in 13 foreign countries. Under Eller's leadership, the company grew from annual sales of $747 million ($2.41 billion in 2025 dollars) to over $3 billion ($7.39 billion in 2025 dollars).

In 1988, the company sent a letter to its over 8,000 employees announcing that it will cut off the medical coverage of those who become sick or injured as a result of AIDS, alcohol, drug abuse or self-inflicted wounds. The company stated that "There are certain lifestyle decisions that we are just not going to assure the results of."

Fortunes declined in the late 1980s as the U.S. economy began to slow down, and Circle K filed for Chapter 11 bankruptcy protection in May 1990; Eller resigned as CEO. Some underperforming locations were sold or closed. In 1993 the company was purchased by Investcorp, an international investment group, and emerged from bankruptcy.

In 1996, Circle K was acquired by Tosco Corporation, an independent petroleum refiner and marketer, but kept its headquarters in Phoenix. Tosco was purchased in 2001 by Phillips Petroleum, which, in 2002, merged with Conoco to form ConocoPhillips. In 2003, Circle K was purchased by Alimentation Couche-Tard, a large, multinational convenience store operator based in the Montreal area, for US$830 million ($1.45 billion in 2025 dollars).

In 2005, Taiwan's OK Convenience Store chain terminated its franchise agreement with Circle K.

In 2006, the company acquired the 90-store Spectrum chain serving Georgia and Alabama, the CFM chain in Missouri, 35 Sterling Dairy locations in Northwest Ohio, and 26 stores under various brands from Chico Enterprises of Morgantown, West Virginia. This came after the 2005 rebranding of the various Couche-Tard stores (Mac's, Bigfoot, Dairy Mart, and Handy Andy) under the more nationally known Circle K brand.

Map of countries with Circle K stores as of August 2026

In mid-2006, Alimentation Couche-Tard entered into a franchising agreement with ConocoPhillips to brand some of its company-owned stores as Circle K, in the western portion of the U.S. ConocoPhillips remodeled the stores into the Circle K scheme but continued to operate them. The stores continued to have the new ConocoPhillips unified canopy design and ProClean fuels. These stores were spun off as Phillips 66 in May 2012.

Another oil company, Canada-based Irving Oil, leased out its convenience stores operating under the Bluecanoe and Mainway banners in the United States and Atlantic Canada to Couche-Tard, which rebranded the locations to Circle K in July 2008, while still selling Irving-branded fuel. However, the Mainways in Newfoundland and Labrador did not change until summer 2010. The parties had earlier formed a similar partnership in Quebec, with the stores there operated as Couche-Tard.

In April 2009, ExxonMobil sold 43 Phoenix stores to parent company Couche-Tard as part of a sale of the larger On the Run franchise. These 43 stores were to be rebranded under the Circle K name.

In July 2010, Circle K had dropped down to fourth rank in number of stores (3,455), behind 7-Eleven (6,523 stores), BP (4,730 stores), and Shell (4,630 convenience stores) in 2010.

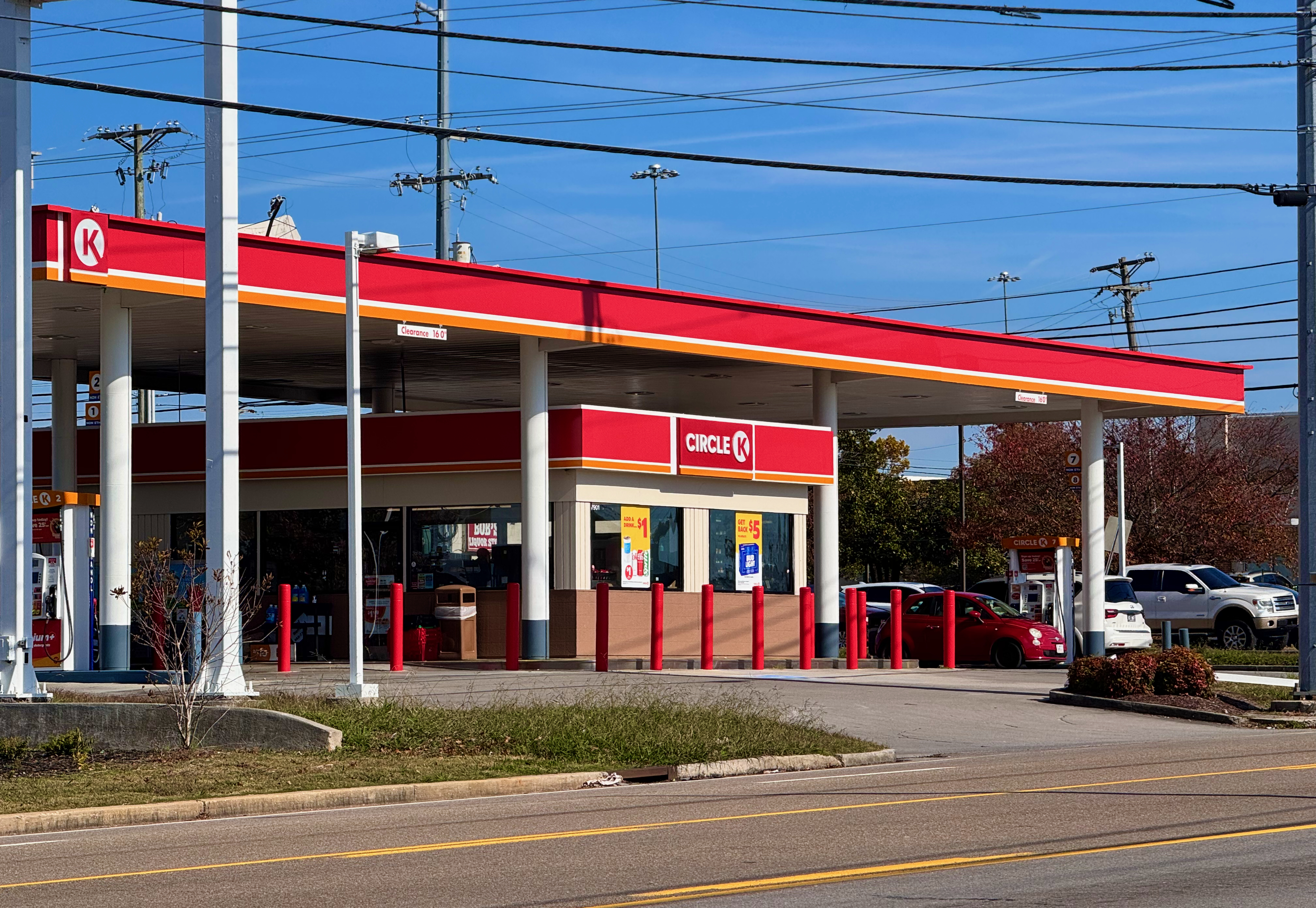
A Circle K gas station in Knoxville, Tennessee

In April 2012, Circle K purchased Norway-based Statoil Fuel and Retail ASA and its 2300 fuel stations located in Scandinavia, the Baltics, Poland, and western Russia for $2.8 billion.

On February 10, 2014, Modelo Group sold the Tiendas Extra brand of stores to the Mexican franchise of Circle K, Circulo K.

On December 18, 2014, Couche-Tard announced its acquisition of The Pantry for $860 million all-cash tender ($1.17 billion in 2025 dollars). The acquisition closed in March 2015. Following the closing, all stores that were owned and operated by The Pantry, many of them under the "Kangaroo Express" name, were expected to be rebranded under the Circle K banner.

On August 12, 2015, Circle K opened its first five convenience stores in Costa Rica, Central America, after having bought and rebranded the local convenience store chain Delimart.

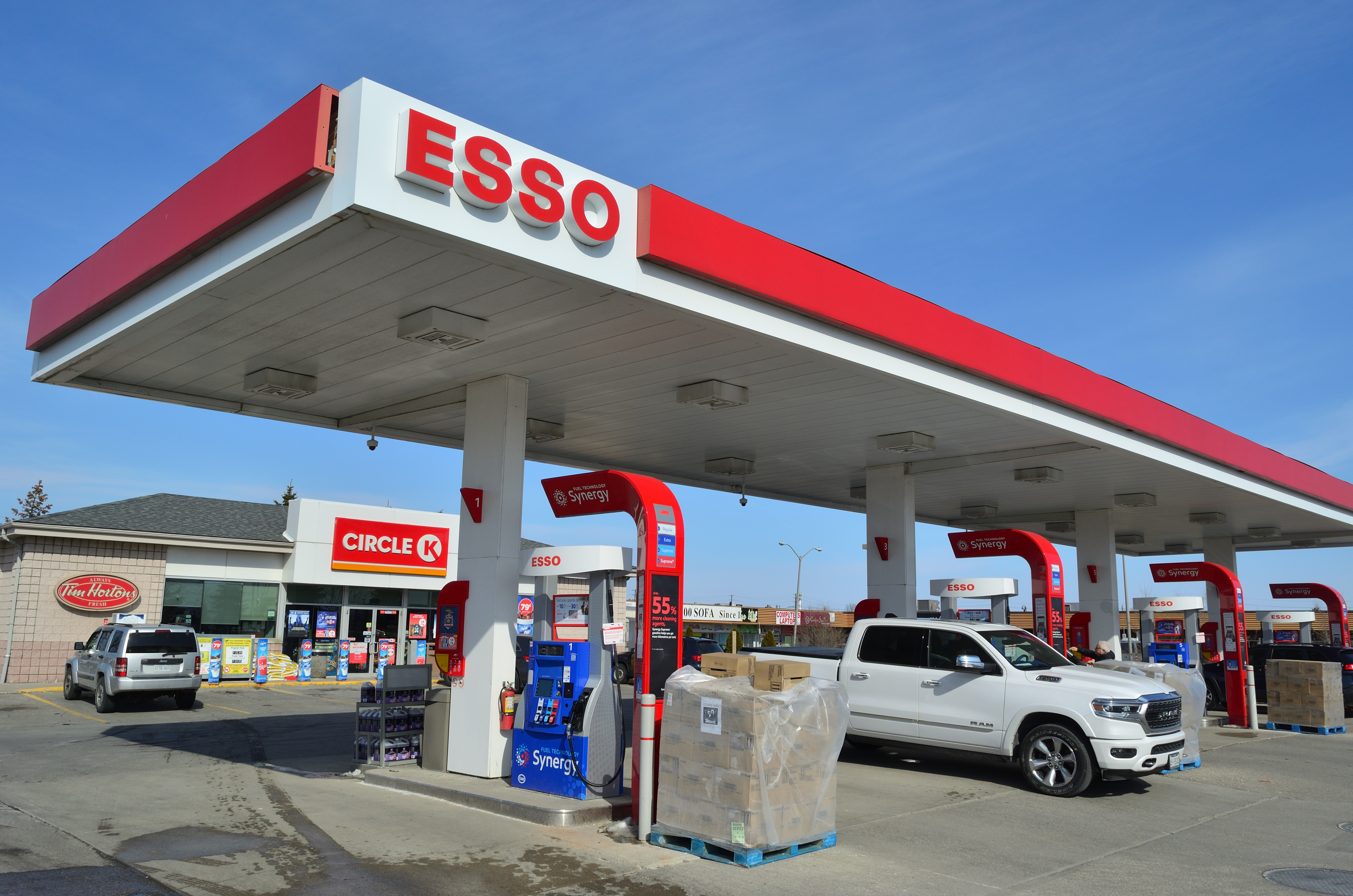
A Circle K in Richmond Hill, Ontario, converted from an On the Run store after its purchase from Imperial Oil

On September 23, 2015, Couche-Tard unveiled a refreshed brand identity for Circle K, and announced that the Statoil (Northern, Central and Eastern Europe) and Mac's (English Canada) brands would be converted to Circle K.

In 2016, Couche-Tard acquired the Irish service station chain Topaz. In April 2018, Couche-Tard announced that they too would be rebranded to Circle K. Couche-Tard similarly acquired Imperial Oil's Esso retail locations in Ontario (228) and Quebec (50) the same year, and rebranded the convenience stores in Ontario (many of which previously operated under the On the Run brand) to Circle K.

In 2017, Couche-Tard completed its acquisition of CST Brands, adding stores formerly owned by Valero Energy, and a portion of the Ultramar chain in Canada to Circle K (with the latter also switching fuel suppliers to Irving).

Also in 2017, Couche-Tard bought Holiday Stationstores, a Minnesota-based chain of fuel stations in the Midwestern United States. Couche-Tard would integrate business practices from Holiday into the Circle K business, including its food service model, full-service franchise program, and car wash subscriptions. Some locations also piloted store formats patterned after that of Holiday.

In November 2018, Circle K opened its first store in New Zealand through master franchisee Pamma Retail Group.

In September 2021, Circle K announced the purchase of 10 convenience and food stores from the Griffin Group in Ireland. All the stores being bought are in Dublin and located in busy areas such as O’Connell Street, College Green, Grafton Street and Sandyford.

In February 2022, Couche-Tard announced that it would rebrand 12 Holiday Stationstores locations in Sioux Falls, South Dakota, to Circle K.

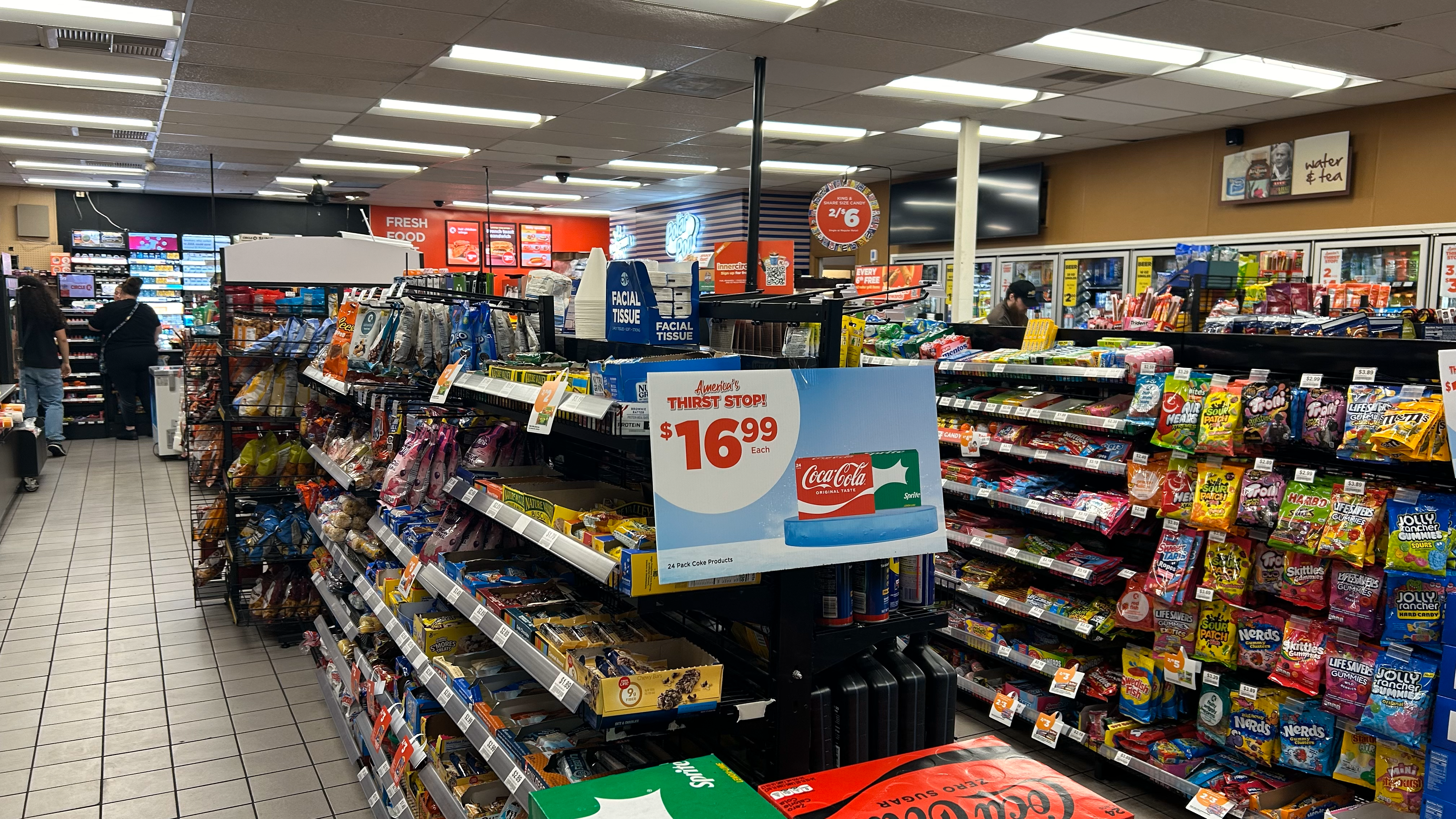
The interior of a Circle K in Orlando, Florida

In April 2022, The Wall Street Journal reported that Couche-Tard was considering buying the British convenience store and restaurant operator EG Group, which would have given it a larger presence in Australia, Western Europe, and EG Group's home market of the United Kingdom, as well as the U.S. (where it had bought Kroger's convenience store business, as well as Cumberland Farms), especially in Florida, New England, and Ohio. EG Group would instead enter into a sale and leaseback agreement for its U.S. stores, and most of its UK gas stations and restaurants would be sold to retail chain Asda (which had recently been acquired by EG founders Mohsin and Zuber Issa) in 2023, along with EG On The Move—a separate company led by Zuber.

On August 19, 2024, Couche-Tard announced it would buy Pittsburgh-based GetGo from Giant Eagle, greatly expanding Circle K's presence in Pennsylvania (all of its existing stores in that state are descended from Lawson's/Dairy Mart) and complementing its existing stores in Ohio, Indiana, and West Virginia, and add to its stores in Maryland. The Federal Trade Commission signed off on the deal on June 26, 2025, with Georgia-based Majors Management purchasing 34 Circle K and one GetGo location to satisfy antitrust concerns. Majors Management rebranded those locations to MAPCO, with all but two of the divestures being in the Indianapolis and Akron, Ohio markets. GetGo will remain headquartered at Giant Eagle's headquarters in Cranberry Township, Pennsylvania as opposed to Circle K's headquarters in Tempe or its Great Lakes offices at the former Lawson's/Dairy Mart headquarters in Akron, but will lease separate space from Giant Eagle. The GetGo brand name is also expected to continue at least in the short-term despite Couche-Tard's ongoing efforts to rebrand its Holiday Stationstores as Circle K. The deal closed June 29, 2025.

== Criticism and controversy ==
=== Animal welfare ===
In 2018, Couche-Tard committed to stop sourcing battery cage eggs in its corporate-owned Circle K stores in North America and Europe by 2025. In 2023, the company expanded this goal to include international franchise locations. In March 2025, the animal protection organization The Humane League criticized Circle K for failing to publicly report progress toward its cage-free commitment.

=== Wage violations ===
A 2021 report on wage theft by the Center for Public Integrity named Circle K as one of the "worst offenders" in the United States. A class-action lawsuit was brought against the company in 2014, for which the company agreed in 2019 to pay a settlement of US$8.3 million. Circle K settled a similar class-action lawsuit in 2015 as well.

== Products ==
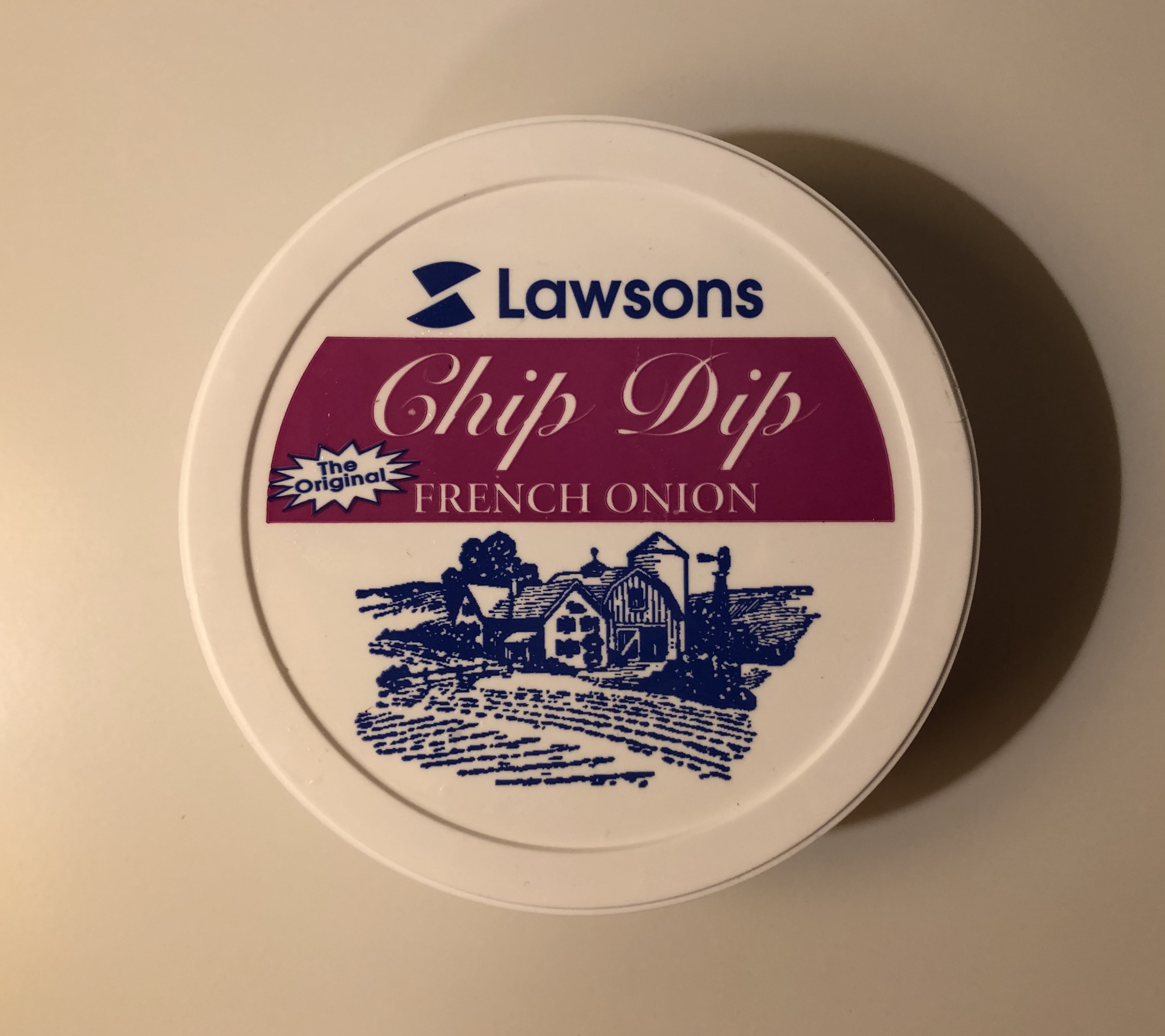
A tub of Lawson's French onion chip dip from a Circle K store in Bowling Green, Ohio. Lawson's chip dip is sold as a private label item at Circle K locations in its Great Lakes division.

Fountain drinks at Circle K are sold in Polar Pop cups, previously called Thirst Busters, and are available in expanded polystyrene cups. In areas where expanded polystyrene containers are illegal, plastic or paper cups are offered. The 52-ounce cups are plastic. Most American locations offer any size, 32 ounce or under, for under $1, while 52 ounces or above cups are priced at over a dollar. The price point of its 44-ounce size (marketed as "Epic XL" in some regions) may vary, as it may be under or over $1, depending on the region.

The Polar Pop was first introduced in Bigfoot convenience stores by Johnson Oil Company in Columbus, Indiana, prior to its acquisition by Alimentation Couche-Tard in 2003. In 2005, Circle K filed a trademark for Polar Pop. In 2007, Circle K reached a settlement agreement with Polar Beverages regarding the use of the Polar Pop name. As of 2018, Circle K sells 17 Polar Pops every second in the United States.

The Froster, which was introduced to Mac's stores in 1998, became very popular throughout Western Canada and Ontario. The American version of the Froster was introduced in 1999.

Circle K locations in the Great Lakes division (Indiana, Kentucky, Michigan, Ohio, Pennsylvania and West Virginia) carry Lawson's branded chip dip, which while primarily a carryover from the former Lawson's/Dairy Mart stores also spread to stores within the Great Lakes division that Couche-Tard has acquired. Following the company's acquisition of GetGo in 2025, GetGo also started carrying Lawson's chip dip, though the locations divested to MAPCO was forced to stop selling it since it is a private label product of Circle K.

== Sponsorship ==
Circle K was a part-time primary sponsor of the No. 28 IndyCar Series racecar driven by Ryan Hunter-Reay of Andretti Autosport between 2011 and 2013. In 2014, it switched to KVSH Racing driver Sébastien Bourdais. Circle K, along with Oberto Sausage Company, currently sponsors Marco Andretti.

In 2017, Circle K went to NASCAR, sponsoring Matt Kenseth and Joe Gibbs Racing with full livery for six races. It was on the car when Kenseth won his final NASCAR Cup Race at that year's fall race at Phoenix Raceway.

Also in 2017, Circle K became the official shirt sponsor of United Soccer League side North Carolina FC and signed a two-year sponsorship agreement with the Lithuanian Basketball League.

Due to its sizable presence in Greater Cleveland, from the former Lawson/Dairy Mart stores, Circle K sponsors the Cleveland Guardians strikeout sign. It is located in center field at Progressive Field in Cleveland, Ohio. The "K" logo represents the "K" used for strikeouts in traditional baseball scorekeeping and is replicated with each strikeout. The same sponsorship is in place with the Arizona Diamondbacks at Chase Field in Phoenix, Arizona. If the Diamondbacks strikeout ten batters or more, the game's attendees receive a voucher for a free cup of Polar Pop, while Guardians fans receive the same voucher after select home games.

In May 2017, a sponsored Circle K Power Cube was introduced into the online game Ingress.

In 2025, Circle K became the official convenience store sponsor of Minor League Baseball, with signage and activations at most ballparks within the United States.

== See also ==
- List of automotive fuel retailers
- List of convenience stores
