= Chevron Phillips Chemical =

American chemical company jointly owned by Chevron and Phillips

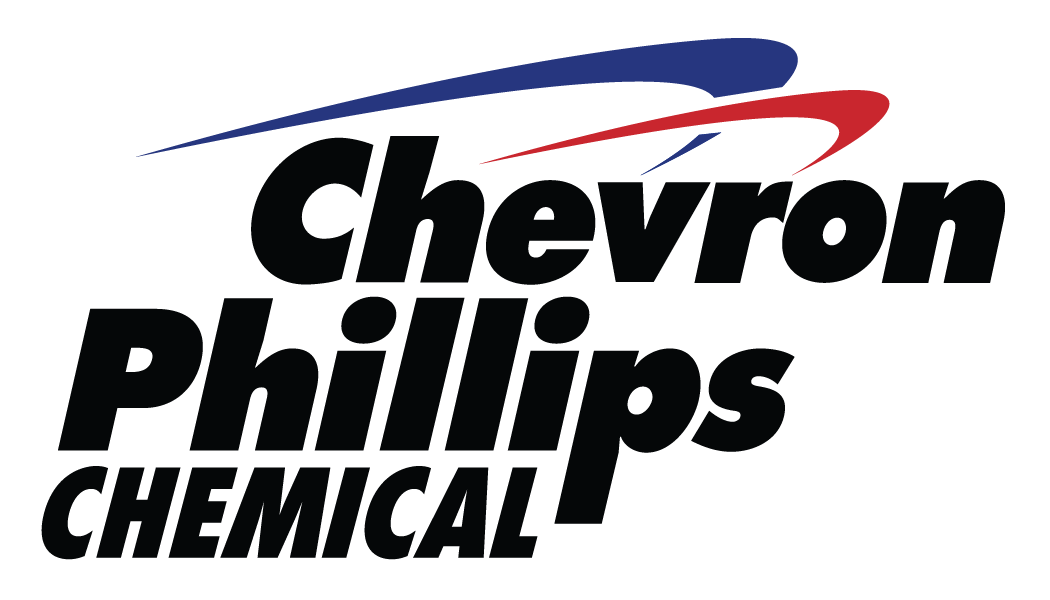
- Logo for Chevron Phillips Chemical
- Type: Joint venture
- Industry: Petrochemical
- Founded: 2000; 26 years ago
- Headquarters: The Woodlands, Texas, United States
- Key people: Steven Prusak (CEO)
- Products: Aromatics; Drilling Specialties; Normal Alpha Olefins; Olefins; Polyalphaoelfins; Polyethylene; Polyethylene Pipe; Specialty Chemicals
- Revenue: ▲$14.18 billion (2023)
- Net income: ▼$1.662 billion (2023)
- Total assets: ▲$17 billion (2022)
- Total equity: ▲$13.569 billion (2023)
- Owners: Chevron (50%); Phillips 66 (50%)
- Number of employees: 5,000 (August 2022)
- Website: cpchem.com

Chevron Phillips Chemical (CPChem) is a petrochemical company that is a 50/50 joint venture between Chevron Corporation and Phillips 66. The company was formed July 1, 2000, by merging the chemicals operations of both Chevron Corporation and Phillips Petroleum Company. As equally owned company, it is governed by a board of directors composed of three members from each of the parent companies. The company was actually named in a coin toss to determine which parent company name would be first and which would be last.

Chevron Phillips Chemical is headquartered in The Woodlands, Texas, a northern suburb of Houston, and is a major producer of ethylene, propylene, polyethylene, Alpha-olefins, Polyalphaolefins, aromatic compounds and a range of specialty chemicals. The company's chemical products are used in thousands of applications including squeezable condiment bottles and shrink-wrapped meat.

== Operations ==
Since its inception, Chevron Phillips has pursued a strategy of international expansion, establishing presence in key global markets. By 1998, it partnered with Qatar Petroleum to gain a foothold in Qatar. The company has also built facilities overseas such as in the Persian Gulf, where it operates in cities like Al Jubail. As of the end of 2021 the company had 5,000 employees worldwide, US$17 billion in assets, and 31 manufacturing and research facilities in six countries, including the United States, Belgium, China, Colombia, Qatar, Saudi Arabia, and Singapore. It has 24 facilities in 13 U.S. states.

== Corporate Locations ==
The headquarters and offices for the Americas are in The Woodlands, Texas. Europe, Middle East, and Africa operations are based in Stockholm Building in Airport Plaza in Diegem, Belgium. Asia Pacific operations are based in Keppel Bay Tower in Singapore.

== Research & Technology Centers ==
Chevron Phillips Chemical has two US based Research and Technology Centers. One is based in Kingwood, Texas and the other is based in Bartlesville, Oklahoma.
