= Fuchs SE =

German multinational manufacturing company

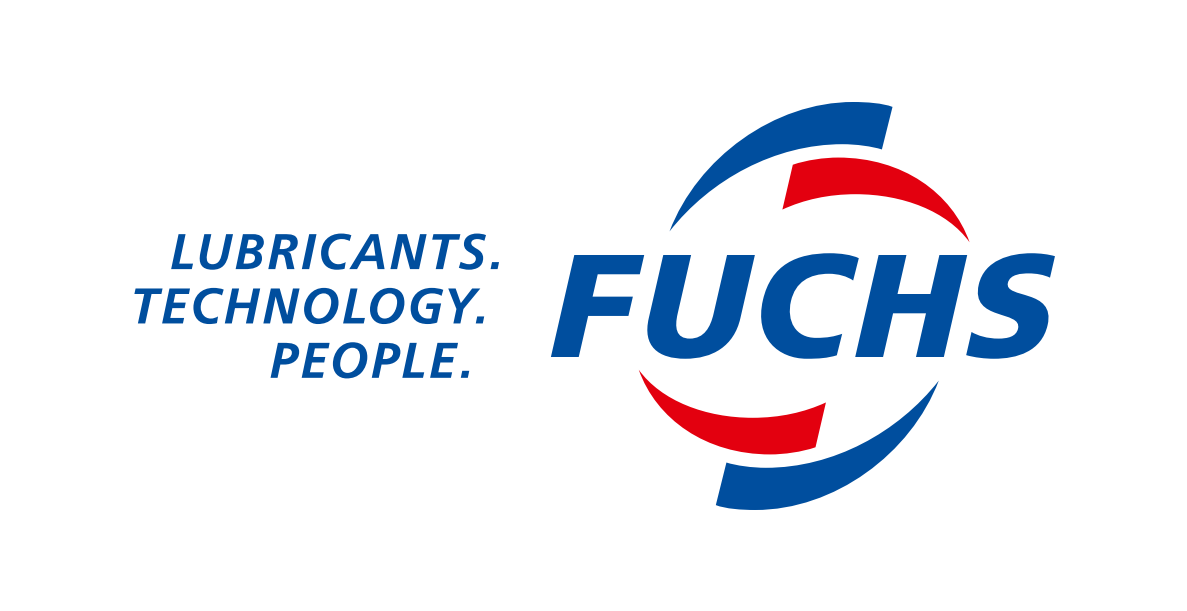
- Type: Societas Europaea
- Traded as: FWB: FPE; MDAX
- Industry: Chemicals
- Founded: 1931
- Founder: Rudolf Fuchs
- Headquarters: Mannheim, Germany
- Number of locations: 58 operating companies, 33 production plants
- Area served: Worldwide
- Key people: Stefan Fuchs (CEO)
- Products: Lubricants, speciality automotive chemicals
- Revenue: €3.56 billion (2025)
- Operating income: €435 million (2025)
- Net income: €306 million (2025)
- Number of employees: 6,879 (December 2025)
- Website: www.fuchs.com/group

Fuchs SE is a German multinational manufacturer of lubricants, and related speciality products.

The company is headquartered in Mannheim, Baden-Württemberg, Germany, where the company was founded in 1931. Fuchs is a public company listed on the Frankfurt Stock Exchange. As of 2008, it is a constituent of the MDAX trading index of German mid-cap companies. Fuchs is the largest independent lubricant manufacturer in the world.

== History ==
=== Founding ===
The company was founded by Rudolf Fuchs on 30 May 1931. It initially traded under the name Rudolf Fuchs, but was then renamed Rudolf Fuchs Mineraloelwerke in 1939. The company's Guaranteed Pennsylvania Motor Oil, under the brand Penna Pura, was produced and bottled in the Mannheim slaughterhouse and distributed to transport companies in the port of Mannheim. In 1936, Fuchs developed his first transmission oil and opened the first branch in Munich.

In 1937, he acquired a plot of land on Friesenheimer Island, where the new company headquarters were inaugurated in 1939.

=== World War 2 and the post-war period ===
At the onset of World War II, Fuchs lost its primary commercial clients as transport companies were forced to downsize their operations and requisition their vehicle fleets to the Wehrmacht. To offset these losses and adjust to severe personnel shortages caused by wartime conscription, the company pivoted its development away from automotive applications toward specialised industrial lubricants.

After the war, Fuchs set up a racing service for motorsport and was represented on major racetracks from 1948, where multiple drivers used Penna Pura Racing Oil RC.

After the death of Rudolf Fuchs in 1959, his son Manfred Fuchs took over the management of the company in 1963.

=== International expansion ===
In 1968, the first foreign subsidiaries were founded in France and Spain. In 1972, the domestic core business was restructured and transferred into a newly created subsidiary, Fuchs Mineraloelwerke GmbH, while the parent firm transitioned into a holding company structure. Expansion continued with the creation of Fuchs Beteiligungsgesellschaft KG in 1975. This restructuring served as a deliberate strategy by Manfred Fuchs to prepare the family-owned firm for the international capital market while legally safeguarding the family's voting majority.

Geographical growth accelerated with the establishment of subsidiaries in Austria, Sweden, Italy and Brazil. In 1978, the Titan brand replaced the name Penna Pura. Fuchs entered the Australian, Asian and American markets in 1981, consolidating its international business by founding Fuchs Petrolub AG in Switzerland that same year. In 1984, Fuchs Beteiligungsgesellschaft KG changed its name to Fuchs Petrolub AG Oel + Chemie. This structural unification preceded a joint venture agreement signed in China in 1985, which led to the first production facility in Yingkou in 1988. By this time, Fuchs had grown to encompass 80 production and trading companies globally.

=== IPO and investments ===
As a result of the expansion and the associated costs, Manfred Fuchs decided to take the family business public. However, to ensure that the majority of votes remained in the family, the company initially issued preference shares. On 30 January 1985, the company finally went public in Frankfurt, Stuttgart and later in Zurich. From 1986, Fuchs also went public with ordinary shares.

In 1989, Fuchs Petrolub took over the French lubricant manufacturer Labo Industrie S.A. and the British lubricant manufacturer Silkolene, as well as Century Oils in 1991. In 2000, around 4000 employees generated a turnover of around 900 million euros.

On 1 January 2004, Manfred Fuchs left the company's Management Board and moved to the Supervisory Board as Deputy Chairman. His son Stefan Fuchs became the new Chairman of the Management Board.

By 2006, turnover had risen to 1.2 billion euros. Fuchs' preference shares have been listed on the MDAX since 23 June 2008. In 2013, the stock corporation was transformed into Fuchs Petrolub SE. A capital increase was carried out in 2014, partly to increase the trading liquidity of Fuchs shares. The number of shares was doubled as of 4 June 2014, while the market value was halved. In the same year, Fuchs purchased the British Batoyle Freedom Group company of Norfolk.

In 2016, the company initiated its largest investment program to date. Around 300 million euros were invested in plant expansions and the construction of new production facilities worldwide. Between 2016 and 2018, for example, new grease plants were built in the USA and South Africa as well as new production facilities in Australia and Sweden. In addition, a new plant for lubricants was opened in Wujiang, China, and the Asian headquarters and the research and development centre in Shanghai were expanded and modernized. Most recently, a new polyurea plant was built in Kaiserslautern and a new office building at the Mannheim site. Fuchs has also repeatedly taken over smaller, long-standing trading partners (including in Egypt, Australia, Finland, Italy and the USA) and sometimes larger manufacturers, including Statoil Fuel & Retail Lubricants AB (SFR Lubricants) (2015), Deutsche Pentosin-Werke GmbH (2015) and Nye Lubricants Inc. (2021).

In 2017, Manfred Fuchs retired from the Supervisory Board; his successor was his daughter Susanne Fuchs. In 2021, Fuchs took over the company Nye Lubricants.

At the Annual General Meeting on 3 May 2023, it was decided to change the name from Fuchs Petrolub SE to Fuchs SE.

== Corporate structure ==
The company's headquarters are located in Mannheim on Friesenheimer Insel.

In 2025, the company generated a turnover of €3.56 billion and employed 6,879 people. Fuchs operates 33 production sites and is represented by 58 operating companies globally.

With around 55% of ordinary shares, the Fuchs family holds the majority of votes. The remaining shares are in free float.

== Products ==
Fuchs SE produces a wide range of automotive and industrial lubricants, including transmission oils, greases, cooling lubricants, and the Planto biodegradable range. The company’s automotive portfolio is anchored by its flagship Titan brand, which includes passenger car and heavy-duty commercial vehicle engine oils, gear oils, and transmission fluids. Within this line, the company utilises its proprietary "XTL" (eXtreme Temperature Lubrication) technology platform, which optimises viscosity-temperature performance to improve cold-start circulation and fuel economy limits.

Fuchs maintains a specialised niche through its 2015 acquisition of Deutsche Pentosin-Werke GmbH, making it a dominant global supplier of specialised dual-clutch transmission (DCT) fluids, central hydraulic fluids, and steering system fluids for major European automotive original equipment manufacturers (OEMs). Under its Silkolene subsidiary brand, the company produces high-performance lubricants specifically formulated for motorcycles and motorsports.

The industrial sector leverages Nye Lubricants Inc. for specialised synthetic greases in aerospace and semiconductor environments. For electric mobility, Fuchs developed the BluEV range and partnered with E-Lyte Innovations GmbH, opening a full-scale production plant in Kaiserslautern in September 2024 with a capacity of 20,000 tonnes of liquid electrolyte solutions annually. The group has achieved CO2 neutrality across its manufacturing and non-producing subsidiaries.

In heavy industry and aviation, the company focuses on high-specification industrial applications, securing specialised original equipment manufacturer (OEM) approvals, including aerospace certifications from Boeing and Rolls-Royce for its customised metalworking coolants. Under its "FUCHS100" global strategy launched in 2026, the group restructured its product pipeline around localised speciality chemical blending to mitigate supply chain volatility and target mid-term sales revenues of €4.0 to €4.5 billion by 2031.

== Awards ==
- 2014: Volkswagen Group Award
