= Judith Somogi =

American conductor

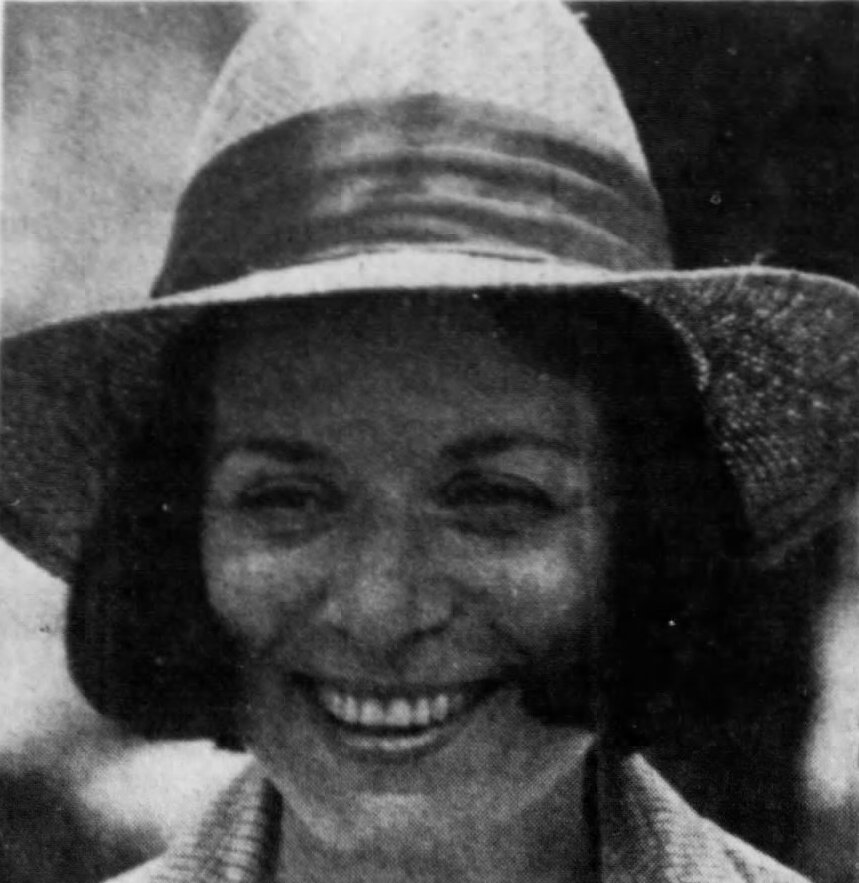
- Somogi circa 1981
- Born: May 13, 1937; Brooklyn, New York
- Died: March 23, 1988 (aged 50); Rockville Centre, New York
- Occupation: Conductor

Judith Somogi (May 13, 1937 – March 23, 1988) was an American conductor, the first woman conductor in the New York City Opera.

== Biography ==
Born to Louis and Antonina Somogi in 1937 in Brooklyn, Somogi studied piano, violin, and organ at the Juilliard School of Music graduating in 1961. She also took courses in Tanglewood, Massachusetts at Berkshire Music Center. Initially Somogi worked as a piano teacher before joining the New York City Opera. From 1966 she was rehearsal pianist, chorus master and coach before she got the chance to take on conducting there. Between seasons Somogi worked as an assistant conductor to Thomas Schippers in Italy at the Spoleto Festival and to and Leopold Stokowski in New York at the American Symphony Orchestra. From 1977 to 1980, Somogi served as music director of the Utica Symphony Orchestra, making her the first woman to hold a permanent orchestral post in the United States. Somogi conducted in San Francisco, San Diego, Los Angeles, Pittsburgh, San Antonio and Saarbrücken. Somogi also conducted the Oklahoma City Orchestra and the Tulsa Philharmonic. A documentary, On Stage with Judith Somogi, was made about her for PBS.

In 1974 Somogi became the first woman conductor in the New York City Opera.

In 1975, she conducted the Naumburg Orchestral Concerts, in the Naumburg Bandshell, Central Park, in the summer series.

She was first conductor at the Oper Frankfurt from 1982 to 1987. In 1984 she became the first woman to conduct in one of Italy's major opera houses. Poor health caused her to retire in 1987 and she died in Long Island, in 1988 after a four year battle with cancer.
