= Motiva Enterprises =

Joint venture between Shell Oil and Saudi Refining

Motiva Enterprises LLC
- Type: Subsidiary
- Industry: Petroleum
- Predecessor: Star Enterprises (1988–97)
- Founded: 1997; 29 years ago
- Fate: Partnership ended in 2017, Shell sold its part to Saudi Aramco which became the whole owner
- Headquarters: Houston, U.S.
- Area served: U.S.
- Brands: Shell; 76
- Services: Oil refining, gas stations
- Number of employees: 2,500
- Parent: Shell Oil Company (1997–2017); Saudi Aramco (1997–present)
- Website: motiva.com

Motiva Enterprises, LLC is an American company that operates as a wholly owned US subsidiary of Saudi Aramco. Headquartered in Houston, Texas, Motiva operates as a distributor of Shell and 76 branded gasolines within its operating territory.

The company began as a 50–50 joint venture between Shell Oil Company (the wholly owned US subsidiary of Royal Dutch Shell) and Saudi Aramco (which had previously partnered with Texaco) in 1997.

== History ==
In 1988, Texaco and Saudi Refining agreed to form a joint venture known as "Star Enterprises" in which Saudi Refining would own a 50 percent share of Texaco's refining and marketing operations in the eastern United States and Gulf Coast.

In 1997, Shell embarked on two joint ventures with Texaco in which the companies merged their marketing and refining operations. The operations in the western and midwestern United States were merged into a company called "Equilon". The Star Enterprises operation and Shell's eastern and southeastern operations were merged into a company called "Motiva". After Texaco merged with Chevron in 2001, Shell and Saudi Refining purchased Texaco's interests in the joint ventures. Equilon became a fully owned subsidiary of Shell, while Saudi Aramco and Shell each became equal owners of Motiva.

In 2016, Motiva obtained an exclusive license for the 76 gasoline brand on the east coast, previously a West Coast-only brand. In March 2017, Royal Dutch Shell plc signed definitive agreements with Saudi Refining Inc. that gave full ownership of refining and marketing joint venture Motiva Enterprises, LLC to Saudi Refining.

== Operations ==
Motiva Enterprises owns and operates the Port Arthur Refinery in Port Arthur, Texas. On 25 May 2012, Motiva officially completed its expansion of the refinery to a capacity of 600,000 bbl/d (95,000 m^{3}/d) making it the largest refinery in North America. By 2018, it is ranked as the sixth-largest refinery in the world.

Motiva's products include diesel, gasoline, liquefied petroleum gas (LPG), aviation fuel, and lubricants which it supplies to American states in the South, Mid-Atlantic, and the Northeast. Marketing outlets include 5200 Shell and 76-branded service stations. Motiva fully divested all 25 finished products terminals in 2023.

== Delaware City Refinery Incident ==
On July 17, 2001, a storage tank at Motiva's Delaware City, Delaware refinery containing spent sulfuric acid exploded, injuring 8 contract workers and killing one. The ruptured tank proceeded to spill approximately 99,000 gallons of sulfuric acid into the Delaware River. U.S. Chemical Safety & Hazard Investigation Board (CSB) lead investigator David Heller concluded, "Motiva did not act to prevent hot work - high-temperature cutting that could generate molten metal and sparks - from being performed directly above a corroded hazardous storage tank that had holes in its roof and shell and was known to contain flammable vapors."

In 2003, Motiva agreed to pay $36.4 million to settle a suit with the family of Jeffrey Davis, the contractor killed in the incident. In 2005, Motiva Enterprises agreed to settle a joint federal-state civil lawsuit for $23.7 million in civil penalties, environmental Projects, injunctive relief and response costs, at the time the largest civil penalty collected in Delaware for environmental violations.

On July 8, 2002, the Delaware State Assembly passed the Jeffrey Davis Aboveground Storage Tank Act, providing additional legal regulations for the containment and maintenance of hazardous chemicals in tanks similar to the one that failed at the Motiva Delaware City Refinery.
