= On the Run (convenience store) =

American convenience store chain

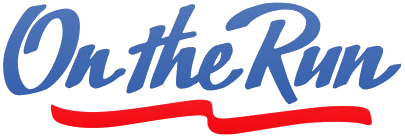

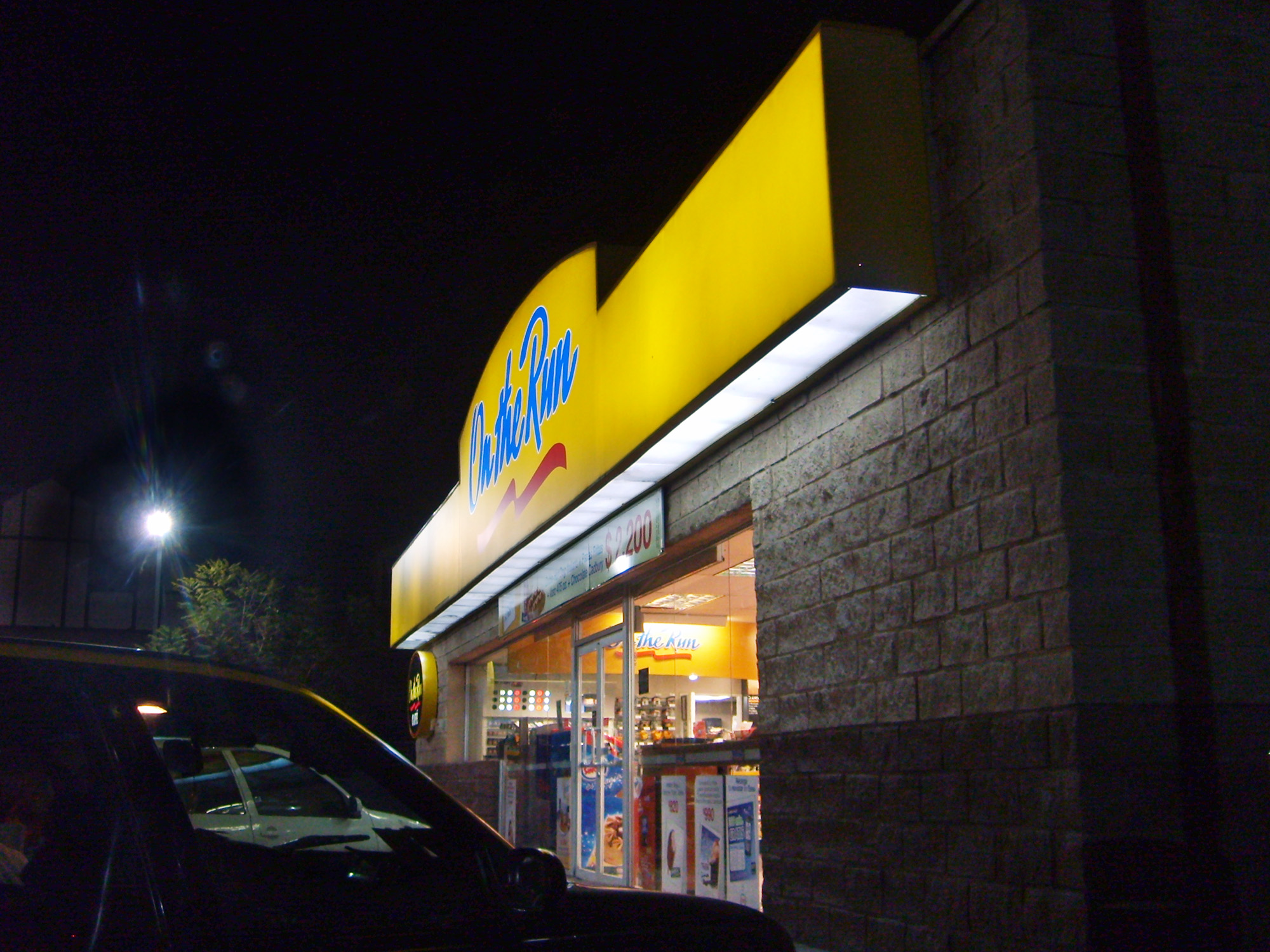
- On the Run store in Santiago, Chile, 2008
- Type: Subsidiary
- Industry: Convenience store
- Founded: 1984; 42 years ago
- Founder: Exxon and Mobil
- Headquarters: United States
- Number of locations: About 2000 (2021)
- Area served: Worldwide
- Owner: ExxonMobil
- Parent: Alimentation Couche-Tard (United States); Parkland Corporation (Canada); ExxonMobil (other territories)
- Website: ontherun.com

On the Run is a flagship convenience store brand developed by ExxonMobil, used at Exxon and Mobil stations in the United States and at Esso and Mobil stations internationally. Alimentation Couche-Tard acquired the On the Run trademark and franchise network in the U.S. in 2009, and Parkland Fuel did the same in Canada in 2016; ExxonMobil retains full ownership of the brand in the rest of the world.

On the Run stores are described as larger and having more products than older-model convenience stores, featuring "fresh snacks, fill-in groceries, health & beauty supplies, plus quick meal options".

The name "On the Run" is used, untranslated, around the world. Locations in the Canadian province of Quebec utilize similar branding as "Marché Express".

== Divestments ==
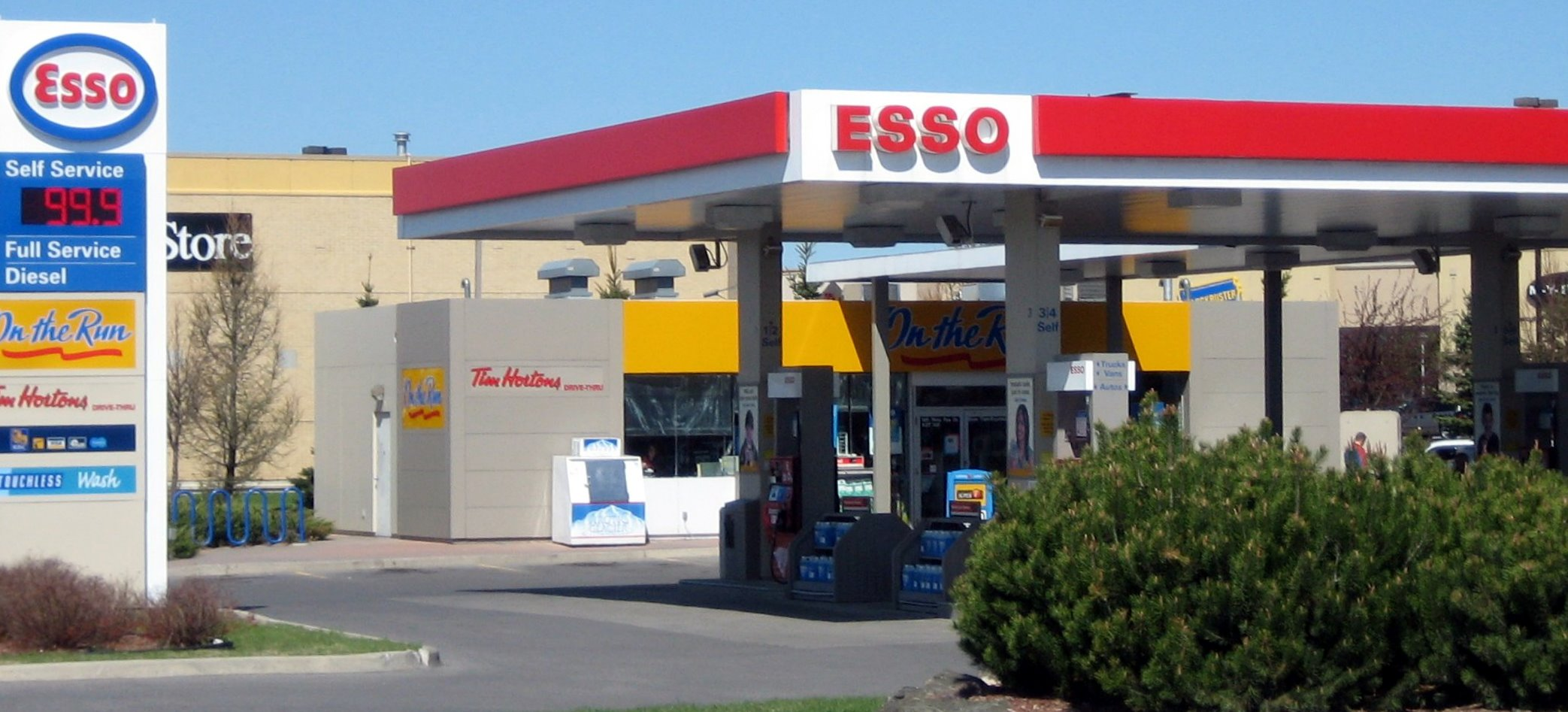
An Esso-branded service station, with On the Run convenience store, in Ottawa, Ontario, Canada (pictured in 2006). Like others in Ontario, the location was sold by Imperial Oil to Couche-Tard in 2016, and the convenience store is now a Circle K.

On April 29, 2009, Canadian convenience store company Alimentation Couche-Tard, which operates stores in the United States under the Circle K name, acquired the 450-store On the Run franchise network (the stores themselves remain with local franchisees) plus 43 ExxonMobil-owned and operated stores in the Phoenix, Arizona area. Many of these stores have been converted to Circle K locations, and the On the Run brand is now only primarily seen in Missouri, Louisiana, and Maine.

In August 2011, 7-Eleven announced it was acquiring 51 ExxonMobil-owned and operated On the Run locations in the Dallas/Fort Worth area; the convenience stores were re-branded as 7-Eleven, but will still sell Exxon-branded gasoline. Houston-area On The Run locations (81 total) were rebranded either as a Timewise (Landmark Industries) or Star Stop (the retail division of Panjwani Energy LLC) convenience store since 7-Eleven does not operate franchises in the Houston Metro area.

In 2016, Imperial Oil began to divest its retail locations in Canada; various Esso locations in Ontario and Quebec were sold to Couche-Tard (being rebranded as Circle K and Couche-Tard), and Seven & I Holdings acquired 148 locations in Alberta and British Columbia for $2.8 billion (with the stores either being converted to 7-Eleven, or rebranded as "smartstop 24/7" with no change in store format over On the Run). Parkland Corporation acquired the remaining On the Run/Marché Express franchise network and associated trademarks in Canada, Parkland introduced an updated On the Run branding in 2018, which it uses in conjunction with its Esso franchises, as well as its own retail brands (such as Chevron, Pioneer, and Ultramar).

== Operations ==
On the Run has over 1500 locations in 38 countries.

=== Ireland ===
Ireland previously had On the Run stores located in Esso stations however they were rebranded after Exxon sold their Irish petrol stations to Topaz which was later sold to Couche Tard with the forecourts rebranded to Circle K. Many of them had a food company called Nine-One-One in them, but they were ordered by the High Court to withdraw in 32 stores.

=== United Kingdom ===
Esso's company-operated convenience stores in the UK were run through ROC UK, a subsidiary of Esso Petroleum Company Limited and ExxonMobil. Initially branded Snack & Shop, the stores were gradually converted to the On The Run format after Exxon acquired Mobil. Between 2011 and 2015 Esso/ROC sold off 359 of its company outlets in regional tranches to three large independent operators - Euro Garages, MRH (GB), and Rontec, although it continued to supply them with Esso branded fuel through an independent wholesaler, Greenergy. None of the new owners continued to use On the Run. Euro Garages mainly used third party names, notably Spar and - for food offerings - Greggs, Subway, Burger King and KFC; MRH used a mix of third party names and its own Hursts C-store branding; and Rontec initially mainly used its own Shop'n Drive name, but occasionally Spar and a discount format, Family Shopper. Esso retained ownership of around 200 sites that have Tesco Express stores where the site is leased to Tesco but sells Esso branded fuel.

=== Egypt ===
In Egypt, On the Run convenience stores are located at Mobil stations in Cairo, Giza and Alexandria. They are open 24 hours, 7 days a week.

== Awards ==
In 2003, On the Run was named Chain of the Year by Convenience Store Decisions (CSD) magazine. In 2007, the chain was again recognized by CSD with the Best in Class Foodservice Award for its line of proprietary gourmet breakfast sandwiches under the On the Run Cafe brand name.

== Controversy in Quebec ==
In 2007, Imperial Oil faced criticism when it planned to rebrand its Marché Express locations as On the Run (beginning with a new location at a Mount Royal Esso station), but threats of boycotts by the Saint-Jean-Baptiste Society, as well as sanctions from the Office québécois de la langue française (which enforces legal protections of the French language), caused the company to backtrack on this decision.

== Trade mark court case in Australia ==
In early 1999, the Peregrine Corporation (Shahin family) registered a separate On The Run brand, now known as OTR, for its convenience store and service station operations in South Australia. In June of the same year, Mobil applied to register trade marks for the words Mobil on the Run and On the Run, the latter of which the Shahin family opposed. Eventually, in 2005, the Federal Court of Australia ruled that the Shahin family did not satisfy the conditions to prove that it owned the trade mark for the words On the Run in common law, even though it had registered the words as a business name, so their opposition to ExxonMobil's trade mark registration was dismissed. However, by 2011, the Shahin family gained sole use of the trade mark and has held it ever since.

While there was no connection between OTR and Mobil's On the Run brands, OTR briefly sold Mobil fuel at 29 sites in South Australia for a few years, after acquiring those Mobil-branded sites in 2010.

== See also ==
- Mac's Convenience Stores
- Circle K
- Imperial Oil
- Mobil
