= Diamond Shamrock =

US oil refinery and gas station company

- Logo used from 2001 to 2021
- Formerly: Diamond Shamrock Corporation (1967–1987); Diamond Shamrock R&M Inc. (1987–1990); Diamond Shamrock Inc. (1990–1996); Ultramar Diamond Shamrock Corp. (1996–2002)
- Type: Public (1967–2001); Brand (2002–2005; 2021–present)
- Traded as: DRM (1987–1996); UDS (1996–2001)
- Predecessor: Diamond Alkali; Shamrock Oil; Sigmor Corp.
- Founded: December 1, 1967; 58 years ago in Cleveland, Ohio U.S.
- Defunct: January 2, 2002
- Fate: Acquired by Valero Energy, remaining as a brand
- Successor: Valero; CST Brands (convenience store network)
- Headquarters: 1 Valero Way, San Antonio, Texas, United States
- Area served: North America
- Products: Gasoline; convenience store; Select locations: truck stops; car wash; repair shop
- Brands: Stop-N-Go
- Owner: Valero Energy Corporation
- Divisions: Corner Store
- Website: valero.com

Diamond Shamrock (formerly known as the Ultramar Diamond Shamrock Corporation) is an American brand of gasoline stations under the ownership of the Valero Energy Corporation and is currently headquartered in San Antonio, Texas. The former company was established on December 1, 1967 when Cleveland-based Diamond Alkali merged with Shamrock Oil of Amarillo, Texas, creating the entity known as the Diamond Shamrock Corporation.

The company was the nineteenth largest energy company in the United States in 1985 and had operations in nineteen states, but had a considerable presence in the states of Oklahoma, Colorado, Texas, New Mexico, and Ohio, with a notable presence within certain markets of California and New York. Diamond Shamrock also owned and operated its convenience store chain Corner Store, that became the predecessor of the chain CST Brands Inc. (succeeded by Circle K in 2017).

In May 1979, Diamond Shamrock announced that it would be moving its corporate headquarters from Cleveland, Ohio to Dallas, Texas in an effort to improve the company’s image and reputation. Looking to expand its presence, the USD160 million acquisition of the Sigmor Corporation in July 1982 added 600 more stores to Diamond Shamrock’s portfolio of locations and also as a dividend, it received ownership of the Three Rivers oil refinery located between San Antonio and Corpus Christi, Texas.

February 1987 saw the detachment of Diamond Shamrock’s production and exploration branch and would rename itself to the Maxus Energy Corporation once the split from its refining and marketing division took effect. Concurrently, Diamond Shamrock’s own refining and marketing division was also renamed as Diamond Shamrock R&M Inc. and would trade under DRM on the New York Stock Exchange. The split subsequently made Maxus Energy (NYSE: MXS) the largest energy company in the United States during that time.

In November 1995, it was announced that Diamond Shamrock would acquire Houston-based National Convenience Stores Inc., who operated business under the Stop-N-Go nameplate for USD260 million, ruining Circle K’s opportunity to acquire the chain for themselves after their bid for USD232 million. In September 1996, it was announced that Diamond Shamrock would be acquired by Montreal-based Ultramar, a Canadian oil company for USD1.96 billion. The primary reason for the merger was originally to attain USD75 million in annual savings, according to Roger Hemminghaus, the chairman of the newly combined companies Ultramar Diamond Shamrock. The Ultramar and Diamond Shamrock merger would also skyrocket the company to become the third-largest in gasoline refining and marketing corporation in the United States and would also increase Diamond Shamrock’s locations to more than 4,400 stores. In April 1997, it was announced that Ultramar Diamond Shamrock would be acquiring the U.S. operations of Total Petroleum N.A. for an estimate of USD400 million, alongside their USD414 million in debt.

In May 2001, it was announced that the Valero Energy Corporation had agreed to acquire Ultramar Diamond Shamrock for USD4 billion, a deal that would make Valero Energy the second-largest oil refiner behind ExxonMobil. The acquisition was approved by the Federal Trade Commission on December 19 via an approval of a consent decree and was finalized and completed on January 2, 2002, ultimately ending the company’s operations. The merger of UDS and Valero would encompass a convenience store network of more than 5,000 stores and twelve refineries.

In July 2005, Valero Energy announced that it would be phasing out the Diamond Shamrock brand and convert its remaining 2,900 locations to the Valero name. Prior to this, the conversion of Diamond Shamrock stores had already started with the east and west coasts of the United States. The conversion would cost Valero Energy roughly USD70 million and would take a little over two years to complete its conversion of over 1,030 stores and 830 branded wholesale sites. Despite the announcement, the remaining Diamond Shamrock locations would not be renovated and converted until 2006.

As of 2024, the Diamond Shamrock brand is still actively being in use by Valero Energy alongside its other brands Beacon, Shamrock, and Texaco (owned and used by Valero Energy solely in the United Kingdom and Ireland since its acquisition of its usage from Chevron in 2011).

The Diamond Shamrock brand is currently being used in Colorado, California, Georgia, New Mexico, Oklahoma, Texas, amongst other states.

== History ==
The origins of Diamond Shamrock can be traced back to three foundation companies: Diamond Alkali, Shamrock Oil and Gas, and Sigmor Corporation.

=== 1910–1983 ===
==== Diamond Alkali ====
In 1910, a group of glass manufacturers founded Diamond Alkali in Pittsburgh, Pennsylvania. They wanted the company to produce soda ash, a key ingredient in glass production. A factory was built in Painesville, Ohio, in 1912 to produce soda ash. During the 1920s, TR Evans led Diamond Alkali, which under his leadership became an important chemical producer. After World War II Ray Evans, TR's son, led the company to decentralize its operations. A new chloralkali plant was built in Deer Park, Texas to make chlorine and caustic soda. In 1948, the company moved its headquarters from Pittsburgh to Cleveland, Ohio. During the 1950s a third plant was constructed in Muscle Shoals, Alabama, helping the company continue to enlarge its range of products, expanding to produce plastics and chemicals for agriculture. The 1960s saw continued expansion of Diamond Alkali. A facility was opened in Delaware City, Delaware and additional chemical companies were purchased, including Chemical Process Company of Redwood City, California and the Nopco Chemical Company of New Jersey. In 1967, Diamond Alkali merged with Shamrock Oil and Gas of Amarillo. At the time of the merger the company produced about 20 percent oil and gas and 80 percent chemicals. In 1978, Diamond Shamrock moved its headquarters to Dallas. By 1980, Diamond Shamrock had about 12,400 employees in thirty-seven countries.

==== Shamrock Oil and Gas ====
John Sheerin founded Shamrock Oil and Gas on August 9, 1929. As a native of Ireland he named the company after the symbol of his country of origin. The company was financed by the Fownes family of Pennsylvania and headquartered in Amarillo. The early years of the company were difficult experiencing a loss of about $9 million. In 1933, Shamrock built its first refinery and its first gas station, both in Sunray, Moore County, Texas. James Harold Dunn joined the company in 1938 as a vice president and general manager, having previously been an engineer at the Lone Star Gas Corporation. The following year Shamrock showed its first, albeit small, profit. During 1939-1940 Lone Star and Shamrock cooperated on the construction of a plant at Murchison in Henderson County whose aim was to recycle natural gas. In 1943, the company paid its first dividend, and by 1944 the company was listed on the NYSE. In 1945, Dunn became the company president, a post he had for ten years. In 1955, Claybourne Allison "Buzz" Cash succeeded him, and in 1959 Shamrock opened its first catalytic cracking unit in Sunray.

In 1960, Shamrock purchased a large number of gas stations from the chain of Sigmor.

==== Sigmor ====
During the 1930s and 1940s, Sigfried "Sig" Moore operated the chain. In 1943, Moore loaned Thomas E. Turner, an employee, money to launch his own business. Turner decided to use the name Sigmor for the chain of stores he established during the 1940s and 1950s. In 1952, Sigmor was incorporated. In 1959, a restructuring took place which allowed each individual gas station to incorporate separately. In 1960, most of the chain was purchased by Shamrock and then leased back to Turner, who continued to lead the company. In 1978, Sigmor purchased its stations back from Diamond Shamrock, continuing to market DS products. By 1983, Sigmor was one of the largest independent service-station chains in the USA.

==== Diamond Shamrock ====
The merger gave Diamond Shamrock 600 retail outlets, plus the Three Rivers oil refinery which was built by Sigmor during the 1970s. In 1987, The Diamond Shamrock Refining and Marketing Company severed ties with Diamond Shamrock Corporation, which was the parent company, and became independent with its headquarters in San Antonio. At that time, as part of the reorganization, Diamond Shamrock Corporation became Maxus Energy Corporation, severing all legal ties to the Diamond Shamrock Refining and Marketing Company. In 1990, Diamond Shamrock Refining and Marketing Company shortened its name to Diamond Shamrock, Incorporated, as it had taken the step of incorporating at that time.

=== 1985–2001 ===
In 1985, the company had a $604.7 million loss. It restructured itself in the year before December 1986. On Wednesday December 3, 1986, T. Boone Pickens offered to buy Diamond Shamrock for $2 billion. Kit Freiden of the Associated Press stated "some analysts predicted the giant energy company would reject the offer."

In 1988, the company's annual refinery sales were $1.8 billion. Diamond Shamrock owned and operated 529 stores. 423 of them were in Texas, with 94 of them in Greater Houston. The company owned an additional 64 stores in Colorado. In 1988, the company bought 80 Tenneco gasoline stations from investor F. Philip Handy, with 30 of them in Houston. According to the plans, the Tenneco stores would be rebranded as Diamond Shamrocks.

In 1995, Diamond Shamrock had 2,000 stores, with most of them in Texas, Colorado, New Mexico, and Louisiana. Of them, over 170 stores were in Houston. That year, Diamond Shamrock bought the National Convenience Stores Stop N Go chain for $260 million. The plans called for the combined company to be headquartered in San Antonio. The combined company was to have two refineries in Texas, 11,000 employees, and 2,600 stores.

In 1996, Canadian company Ultramar bought Diamond Shamrock for $1.96 billion in stock and assumed debt. The combined company was renamed "Ultramar Diamond Shamrock". Diamond Shamrock also sold Total Petroleum, which started in Alma, Michigan, to Marathon Petroleum in 1999.

Valero Energy Corporation acquired Ultramar Diamond Shamrock in 2001.

=== 2021–present (revival) ===
Beginning in early 2021, Valero revived the Diamond Shamrock brand and gave a new logo and design to be relevant to the 2018 Valero rebrand for the brand with new locations in California, Georgia, New Mexico and Texas.
