= 2006 Canadian Junior Curling Championships =

The 2006 M&M Meat Shops Canadian Junior Curling Championships were held at the Fort William Curling Club and the Port Arthur Curling Club in Thunder Bay, Ontario from January 21 to 29. The winning teams represented Canada at the 2006 World Junior Curling Championships.

== Men's ==
=== Teams ===
| Province / Territory | Skip | Third | Second | Lead |
|---|---|---|---|---|
| Alberta | Charley Thomas | Geoff Walker | Rollie Robinson | Kyle Reynolds |
| British Columbia | Ty Griffith | Russ Koffski | Derek Ryan | Mitchell Ursel |
| Manitoba | Travis Bale | Curtis Bale | Nigel Milnes | Alex Mitchell |
| New Brunswick | Jeremy Mallais | Marc Belliveau | Luc Savoie | Charles Savoie |
| Newfoundland and Labrador | Alan Hamilton | Stephen Jeffers | Tim Norman | Garrett Wells |
| Northern Ontario | Jeff Sargent | Kory Carr | Adams Lamers | Tommy Bragnalo |
| Northwest Territories | Colin Miller | Matthew Whiteford | Robert Heimbach | David Aho |
| Nova Scotia | Dom Daemen | Ian Juurlink | Robby McLean | Jared Bowles |
| Ontario | Codey Maus | Jeff Grant | Allan Stahl | Bill Francis |
| Prince Edward Island | Brett Gallant | Adam Casey | Anson Carmody | Alex MacFadyen |
| Quebec | Martin Crete | Philippe Menard | Jasmin Gibeau | Mathieu Dubois |
| Saskatchewan | Mitch Heidt | Brennen Jones | Drew Heidt | Dustin Kidby |
| Yukon | Trevor Prosko | Alexx Peech | Toby Reams | David Giesbrecht |

=== Standings ===
| Locale | Skip | W | L |
|---|---|---|---|
| British Columbia | Tyrel Griffith | 10 | 2 |
| Alberta | Charley Thomas | 8 | 4 |
| Ontario | Codey Maus | 8 | 4 |
| New Brunswick | Jeremy Mallais | 7 | 5 |
| Nova Scotia | Dom Daemen | 7 | 5 |
| Quebec | Martin Crete | 7 | 5 |
| Prince Edward Island | Brett Gallant | 7 | 5 |
| Saskatchewan | Mitch Heidt | 7 | 5 |
| Manitoba | Travis Bale | 6 | 6 |
| Newfoundland and Labrador | Alan Hamilton | 4 | 8 |
| Northern Ontario | Jeff Sargent | 4 | 8 |
| Yukon | Trevor Prosko | 3 | 9 |
| Northwest Territories | Colin Miller | 0 | 12 |

=== Results ===
==== Draw 1 ====
| Sheet B | 1 | 2 | 3 | 4 | 5 | 6 | 7 | 8 | 9 | 10 | Final |
|---|---|---|---|---|---|---|---|---|---|---|---|
| Nova Scotia (Daemen) 🔨 | 0 | 0 | 0 | 1 | 0 | 2 | 0 | 0 | 1 | 0 | 4 |
| Manitoba (Bale) | 1 | 1 | 0 | 0 | 1 | 0 | 2 | 0 | 0 | 1 | 6 |

| Sheet D | 1 | 2 | 3 | 4 | 5 | 6 | 7 | 8 | 9 | 10 | Final |
|---|---|---|---|---|---|---|---|---|---|---|---|
| Northern Ontario (Sargent) 🔨 | 0 | 3 | 0 | 0 | 0 | 0 | 0 | 0 | 1 | X | 4 |
| British Columbia (Griffith) | 0 | 0 | 1 | 0 | 2 | 2 | 1 | 2 | 0 | X | 8 |

| Sheet F | 1 | 2 | 3 | 4 | 5 | 6 | 7 | 8 | 9 | 10 | Final |
|---|---|---|---|---|---|---|---|---|---|---|---|
| Quebec (Crete) 🔨 | 1 | 0 | 0 | 1 | 0 | 1 | 0 | 1 | 0 | 0 | 4 |
| New Brunswick (Mallais) | 0 | 1 | 1 | 0 | 1 | 0 | 2 | 0 | 2 | 1 | 8 |

| Sheet H | 1 | 2 | 3 | 4 | 5 | 6 | 7 | 8 | 9 | 10 | Final |
|---|---|---|---|---|---|---|---|---|---|---|---|
| Northwest Territories (Miller) 🔨 | 0 | 0 | 0 | 0 | 1 | 0 | 1 | 0 | 0 | X | 2 |
| Prince Edward Island (Gallant) | 1 | 1 | 2 | 2 | 0 | 1 | 0 | 0 | 3 | X | 10 |

| Sheet J | 1 | 2 | 3 | 4 | 5 | 6 | 7 | 8 | 9 | 10 | Final |
|---|---|---|---|---|---|---|---|---|---|---|---|
| Newfoundland and Labrador (Hamilton) 🔨 | 1 | 0 | 0 | 0 | 1 | 0 | 1 | 0 | 0 | 2 | 5 |
| Saskatchewan (Heidt) | 0 | 0 | 1 | 1 | 0 | 0 | 0 | 1 | 3 | 0 | 6 |

| Sheet L | 1 | 2 | 3 | 4 | 5 | 6 | 7 | 8 | 9 | 10 | Final |
|---|---|---|---|---|---|---|---|---|---|---|---|
| Ontario (Maus) 🔨 | 3 | 0 | 0 | 4 | 1 | 0 | 5 | X | X | X | 13 |
| Yukon (Prosko) | 0 | 1 | 1 | 0 | 0 | 3 | 0 | X | X | X | 5 |

==== Draw 2 ====
| Sheet A | 1 | 2 | 3 | 4 | 5 | 6 | 7 | 8 | 9 | 10 | Final |
|---|---|---|---|---|---|---|---|---|---|---|---|
| Yukon (Prosko) 🔨 | 0 | 0 | 2 | 0 | 0 | 2 | 0 | 1 | X | X | 5 |
| Saskatchewan (Heidt) | 1 | 3 | 0 | 1 | 2 | 0 | 2 | 0 | X | X | 9 |

| Sheet C | 1 | 2 | 3 | 4 | 5 | 6 | 7 | 8 | 9 | 10 | Final |
|---|---|---|---|---|---|---|---|---|---|---|---|
| Nova Scotia (Daemen) 🔨 | 0 | 1 | 0 | 2 | 0 | 1 | 0 | 2 | 0 | X | 6 |
| Newfoundland and Labrador (Hamilton) | 1 | 0 | 2 | 0 | 2 | 0 | 1 | 0 | 4 | X | 10 |

| Sheet E | 1 | 2 | 3 | 4 | 5 | 6 | 7 | 8 | 9 | 10 | Final |
|---|---|---|---|---|---|---|---|---|---|---|---|
| Alberta (Thomas) 🔨 | 1 | 1 | 0 | 2 | 3 | 2 | 1 | 2 | X | X | 12 |
| Northwest Territories (Miller) | 0 | 0 | 1 | 0 | 0 | 0 | 0 | 0 | X | X | 1 |

| Sheet G | 1 | 2 | 3 | 4 | 5 | 6 | 7 | 8 | 9 | 10 | Final |
|---|---|---|---|---|---|---|---|---|---|---|---|
| Northern Ontario (Sargent) 🔨 | 1 | 0 | 2 | 0 | 3 | 0 | X | X | X | X | 6 |
| Manitoba (Bale) | 0 | 1 | 0 | 0 | 0 | 1 | X | X | X | X | 2 |

| Sheet I | 1 | 2 | 3 | 4 | 5 | 6 | 7 | 8 | 9 | 10 | Final |
|---|---|---|---|---|---|---|---|---|---|---|---|
| Ontario (Maus) 🔨 | 1 | 0 | 0 | 3 | 2 | 0 | 1 | 0 | 0 | X | 7 |
| Quebec (Crete) | 0 | 1 | 0 | 0 | 0 | 1 | 0 | 1 | 0 | X | 3 |

| Sheet K | 1 | 2 | 3 | 4 | 5 | 6 | 7 | 8 | 9 | 10 | Final |
|---|---|---|---|---|---|---|---|---|---|---|---|
| New Brunswick (Mallais) 🔨 | 1 | 0 | 1 | 0 | 2 | 0 | 2 | 2 | X | X | 8 |
| Prince Edward Island (Gallant) | 0 | 0 | 0 | 1 | 0 | 1 | 0 | 0 | X | X | 2 |

==== Draw 3 ====
| Sheet A | 1 | 2 | 3 | 4 | 5 | 6 | 7 | 8 | 9 | 10 | Final |
|---|---|---|---|---|---|---|---|---|---|---|---|
| Prince Edward Island (Gallant) 🔨 | 1 | 0 | 1 | 0 | 3 | 0 | 0 | 0 | 1 | 0 | 6 |
| British Columbia (Griffith) | 0 | 3 | 0 | 1 | 0 | 0 | 1 | 0 | 0 | 5 | 10 |

| Sheet C | 1 | 2 | 3 | 4 | 5 | 6 | 7 | 8 | 9 | 10 | Final |
|---|---|---|---|---|---|---|---|---|---|---|---|
| Manitoba (Bale) 🔨 | 2 | 0 | 2 | 2 | 0 | 0 | 1 | 0 | 2 | X | 9 |
| Alberta (Thomas) | 0 | 1 | 0 | 0 | 1 | 1 | 0 | 0 | 0 | X | 3 |

| Sheet E | 1 | 2 | 3 | 4 | 5 | 6 | 7 | 8 | 9 | 10 | Final |
|---|---|---|---|---|---|---|---|---|---|---|---|
| Nova Scotia (Daemen) 🔨 | 0 | 0 | 1 | 0 | 3 | 0 | 1 | 0 | 1 | X | 6 |
| Ontario (Maus) | 1 | 1 | 0 | 2 | 0 | 1 | 0 | 2 | 0 | X | 7 |

| Sheet G | 1 | 2 | 3 | 4 | 5 | 6 | 7 | 8 | 9 | 10 | Final |
|---|---|---|---|---|---|---|---|---|---|---|---|
| Saskatchewan (Heidt) 🔨 | 0 | 0 | 3 | 0 | 0 | 3 | 0 | 0 | 0 | 0 | 6 |
| Quebec (Crete) | 1 | 1 | 0 | 0 | 1 | 0 | 0 | 2 | 1 | 1 | 7 |

| Sheet I | 1 | 2 | 3 | 4 | 5 | 6 | 7 | 8 | 9 | 10 | Final |
|---|---|---|---|---|---|---|---|---|---|---|---|
| Yukon (Prosko) 🔨 | 2 | 0 | 1 | 0 | 1 | 0 | 2 | 0 | 4 | 0 | 10 |
| Northwest Territories (Miller) | 0 | 0 | 0 | 1 | 0 | 2 | 0 | 1 | 0 | 3 | 7 |

| Sheet K | 1 | 2 | 3 | 4 | 5 | 6 | 7 | 8 | 9 | 10 | Final |
|---|---|---|---|---|---|---|---|---|---|---|---|
| Newfoundland and Labrador (Hamilton) 🔨 | 1 | 2 | 0 | 2 | 0 | 0 | 1 | 0 | 0 | 1 | 7 |
| Northern Ontario (Sargent) | 0 | 0 | 2 | 0 | 1 | 0 | 0 | 1 | 1 | 0 | 5 |

==== Draw 4 ====
| Sheet B | 1 | 2 | 3 | 4 | 5 | 6 | 7 | 8 | 9 | 10 | Final |
|---|---|---|---|---|---|---|---|---|---|---|---|
| Quebec (Crete) 🔨 | 4 | 0 | 1 | 0 | 4 | 2 | X | X | X | X | 11 |
| Northwest Territories (Miller) | 0 | 1 | 0 | 0 | 0 | 0 | X | X | X | X | 1 |

| Sheet C | 1 | 2 | 3 | 4 | 5 | 6 | 7 | 8 | 9 | 10 | Final |
|---|---|---|---|---|---|---|---|---|---|---|---|
| New Brunswick (Mallais) 🔨 | 1 | 0 | 0 | 1 | 1 | 3 | 0 | 0 | 1 | X | 7 |
| Saskatchewan (Heidt) | 0 | 0 | 1 | 0 | 0 | 0 | 2 | 1 | 0 | X | 4 |

| Sheet E | 1 | 2 | 3 | 4 | 5 | 6 | 7 | 8 | 9 | 10 | Final |
|---|---|---|---|---|---|---|---|---|---|---|---|
| Manitoba (Hale) 🔨 | 0 | 1 | 1 | 0 | 1 | 0 | 0 | 0 | 0 | X | 3 |
| Yukon (Prosko) | 2 | 0 | 0 | 1 | 0 | 2 | 1 | 0 | 2 | X | 8 |

| Sheet H | 1 | 2 | 3 | 4 | 5 | 6 | 7 | 8 | 9 | 10 | Final |
|---|---|---|---|---|---|---|---|---|---|---|---|
| Northern Ontario (Sargent) 🔨 | 1 | 0 | 1 | 1 | 0 | 0 | 1 | X | X | X | 4 |
| Nova Scotia (Daemen) | 0 | 1 | 0 | 0 | 5 | 3 | 0 | X | X | X | 9 |

| Sheet J | 1 | 2 | 3 | 4 | 5 | 6 | 7 | 8 | 9 | 10 | Final |
|---|---|---|---|---|---|---|---|---|---|---|---|
| Alberta (Thomas) 🔨 | 0 | 2 | 1 | 3 | 1 | 0 | 5 | X | X | X | 12 |
| Prince Edward Island (Gallant) | 0 | 0 | 0 | 0 | 0 | 1 | 0 | X | X | X | 1 |

| Sheet K | 1 | 2 | 3 | 4 | 5 | 6 | 7 | 8 | 9 | 10 | Final |
|---|---|---|---|---|---|---|---|---|---|---|---|
| British Columbia (Griffith) 🔨 | 0 | 0 | 1 | 0 | 0 | 0 | 1 | 0 | 2 | 0 | 4 |
| Ontario (Maus) | 0 | 1 | 0 | 1 | 1 | 0 | 0 | 1 | 0 | 1 | 5 |

==== Draw 5 ====
| Sheet A | 1 | 2 | 3 | 4 | 5 | 6 | 7 | 8 | 9 | 10 | Final |
|---|---|---|---|---|---|---|---|---|---|---|---|
| Alberta (Thomas) 🔨 | 2 | 0 | 0 | 1 | 0 | 2 | 0 | 2 | 2 | X | 9 |
| Northern Ontario (Sargent) | 0 | 1 | 0 | 0 | 2 | 0 | 1 | 0 | 0 | X | 4 |

| Sheet C | 1 | 2 | 3 | 4 | 5 | 6 | 7 | 8 | 9 | 10 | Final |
|---|---|---|---|---|---|---|---|---|---|---|---|
| Ontario (Maus) 🔨 | 0 | 4 | 0 | 5 | 0 | 3 | 1 | X | X | X | 13 |
| Northwest Territories (Miller) | 0 | 0 | 2 | 0 | 1 | 0 | 0 | X | X | X | 3 |

| Sheet E | 1 | 2 | 3 | 4 | 5 | 6 | 7 | 8 | 9 | 10 | Final |
|---|---|---|---|---|---|---|---|---|---|---|---|
| Saskatchewan (Heidt) 🔨 | 2 | 0 | 2 | 0 | 0 | 0 | 0 | 2 | 1 | 0 | 7 |
| British Columbia (Griffith) | 0 | 1 | 0 | 4 | 1 | 1 | 1 | 0 | 0 | 4 | 12 |

| Sheet G | 1 | 2 | 3 | 4 | 5 | 6 | 7 | 8 | 9 | 10 | Final |
|---|---|---|---|---|---|---|---|---|---|---|---|
| Prince Edward Island (Gallant) 🔨 | 0 | 0 | 3 | 0 | 1 | 0 | 3 | 0 | 2 | X | 9 |
| Yukon (Prosko) | 1 | 0 | 0 | 2 | 0 | 0 | 0 | 1 | 0 | X | 4 |

| Sheet I | 1 | 2 | 3 | 4 | 5 | 6 | 7 | 8 | 9 | 10 | Final |
|---|---|---|---|---|---|---|---|---|---|---|---|
| Newfoundland and Labrador (Hamilton) 🔨 | 2 | 0 | 2 | 0 | 3 | 0 | 1 | 0 | 0 | 0 | 8 |
| Manitoba (Bale) | 0 | 2 | 0 | 2 | 0 | 2 | 0 | 3 | 1 | 1 | 11 |

| Sheet L | 1 | 2 | 3 | 4 | 5 | 6 | 7 | 8 | 9 | 10 | Final |
|---|---|---|---|---|---|---|---|---|---|---|---|
| New Brunswick (Mallais) 🔨 | 0 | 3 | 2 | 4 | 0 | 0 | 1 | 0 | X | X | 10 |
| Nova Scotia (Daemen) | 0 | 0 | 0 | 0 | 3 | 1 | 0 | 2 | X | X | 6 |

==== Draw 6 ====
| Sheet B | 1 | 2 | 3 | 4 | 5 | 6 | 7 | 8 | 9 | 10 | 11 | Final |
|---|---|---|---|---|---|---|---|---|---|---|---|---|
| Ontario (Maus) 🔨 | 1 | 0 | 1 | 1 | 0 | 2 | 0 | 0 | 1 | 1 | 0 | 7 |
| Prince Edward Island (Gallant) | 0 | 1 | 0 | 0 | 4 | 0 | 2 | 0 | 0 | 0 | 2 | 9 |

| Sheet D | 1 | 2 | 3 | 4 | 5 | 6 | 7 | 8 | 9 | 10 | 11 | Final |
|---|---|---|---|---|---|---|---|---|---|---|---|---|
| Yukon (Prosko) 🔨 | 0 | 1 | 0 | 2 | 0 | 0 | 0 | 2 | 2 | 0 | 1 | 8 |
| Newfoundland and Labrador (Hamilton) | 1 | 0 | 1 | 0 | 3 | 1 | 0 | 0 | 0 | 1 | 0 | 7 |

| Sheet E | 1 | 2 | 3 | 4 | 5 | 6 | 7 | 8 | 9 | 10 | Final |
|---|---|---|---|---|---|---|---|---|---|---|---|
| Northwest Territories (Miller) 🔨 | 1 | 0 | 1 | 0 | 0 | 1 | 0 | 2 | 0 | X | 5 |
| New Brunswick (Mallais) | 0 | 1 | 0 | 3 | 1 | 0 | 2 | 0 | 3 | X | 10 |

| Sheet H | 1 | 2 | 3 | 4 | 5 | 6 | 7 | 8 | 9 | 10 | Final |
|---|---|---|---|---|---|---|---|---|---|---|---|
| British Columbia (Griffith) 🔨 | 0 | 0 | 3 | 1 | 1 | 0 | 2 | 0 | X | X | 7 |
| Quebec (Crete) | 0 | 0 | 0 | 0 | 0 | 1 | 0 | 1 | X | X | 2 |

| Sheet I | 1 | 2 | 3 | 4 | 5 | 6 | 7 | 8 | 9 | 10 | Final |
|---|---|---|---|---|---|---|---|---|---|---|---|
| Nova Scotia (Daemen) 🔨 | 1 | 0 | 1 | 0 | 2 | 0 | 0 | 1 | 0 | 2 | 7 |
| Alberta (Thomas) | 0 | 1 | 0 | 1 | 0 | 1 | 1 | 0 | 0 | 0 | 4 |

| Sheet L | 1 | 2 | 3 | 4 | 5 | 6 | 7 | 8 | 9 | 10 | Final |
|---|---|---|---|---|---|---|---|---|---|---|---|
| Northern Ontario (Sargent) 🔨 | 0 | 1 | 0 | 0 | 2 | 0 | 2 | 0 | 1 | 0 | 6 |
| Saskatchewan (Heidt) | 0 | 0 | 2 | 1 | 0 | 1 | 0 | 1 | 0 | 2 | 7 |

==== Draw 7 ====
| Sheet A | 1 | 2 | 3 | 4 | 5 | 6 | 7 | 8 | 9 | 10 | Final |
|---|---|---|---|---|---|---|---|---|---|---|---|
| Yukon (Prosko) 🔨 | 0 | 1 | 0 | 1 | 0 | 1 | 0 | 1 | 1 | 0 | 5 |
| Nova Scotia (Daemen) | 0 | 0 | 1 | 0 | 1 | 0 | 1 | 0 | 0 | 3 | 6 |

| Sheet D | 1 | 2 | 3 | 4 | 5 | 6 | 7 | 8 | 9 | 10 | Final |
|---|---|---|---|---|---|---|---|---|---|---|---|
| Saskatchewan (Heidt) 🔨 | 0 | 2 | 0 | 3 | 0 | 0 | 1 | 0 | 0 | X | 6 |
| Alberta (Thomas) | 0 | 0 | 1 | 0 | 1 | 1 | 0 | 0 | 1 | X | 4 |

| Sheet E | 1 | 2 | 3 | 4 | 5 | 6 | 7 | 8 | 9 | 10 | Final |
|---|---|---|---|---|---|---|---|---|---|---|---|
| Quebec (Crete) 🔨 | 0 | 0 | 1 | 1 | 1 | 1 | 0 | 3 | X | X | 7 |
| Northern Ontario (Sargent) | 0 | 1 | 0 | 0 | 0 | 0 | 1 | 0 | X | X | 2 |

| Sheet G | 1 | 2 | 3 | 4 | 5 | 6 | 7 | 8 | 9 | 10 | Final |
|---|---|---|---|---|---|---|---|---|---|---|---|
| Newfoundland and Labrador (Hamilton) 🔨 | 4 | 3 | 1 | 0 | 3 | 3 | X | X | X | X | 14 |
| Northwest Territories (Miller) | 0 | 0 | 0 | 2 | 0 | 0 | X | X | X | X | 2 |

| Sheet I | 1 | 2 | 3 | 4 | 5 | 6 | 7 | 8 | 9 | 10 | Final |
|---|---|---|---|---|---|---|---|---|---|---|---|
| British Columbia (Griffith) 🔨 | 0 | 1 | 4 | 0 | 0 | 0 | 1 | 1 | 1 | X | 8 |
| New Brunswick (Mallais) | 0 | 0 | 0 | 2 | 1 | 1 | 0 | 0 | 0 | X | 4 |

| Sheet L | 1 | 2 | 3 | 4 | 5 | 6 | 7 | 8 | 9 | 10 | Final |
|---|---|---|---|---|---|---|---|---|---|---|---|
| Prince Edward Island (Gallant) 🔨 | 1 | 0 | 0 | 0 | 2 | 0 | 0 | 0 | 2 | 1 | 6 |
| Manitoba (Bale) | 0 | 0 | 0 | 2 | 0 | 1 | 1 | 1 | 0 | 0 | 5 |

==== Draw 8 ====
| Sheet B | 1 | 2 | 3 | 4 | 5 | 6 | 7 | 8 | 9 | 10 | Final |
|---|---|---|---|---|---|---|---|---|---|---|---|
| Northwest Territories (Miller) 🔨 | 1 | 0 | 1 | 0 | 1 | 0 | 0 | X | X | X | 3 |
| British Columbia (Griffith) | 0 | 6 | 0 | 2 | 0 | 2 | 4 | X | X | X | 14 |

| Sheet C | 1 | 2 | 3 | 4 | 5 | 6 | 7 | 8 | 9 | 10 | Final |
|---|---|---|---|---|---|---|---|---|---|---|---|
| Prince Edward Island (Gallant) 🔨 | 0 | 2 | 0 | 1 | 0 | 1 | 2 | 0 | 0 | 1 | 7 |
| Northern Ontario (Sargent) | 0 | 0 | 1 | 0 | 2 | 0 | 0 | 2 | 1 | 0 | 6 |

| Sheet F | 1 | 2 | 3 | 4 | 5 | 6 | 7 | 8 | 9 | 10 | Final |
|---|---|---|---|---|---|---|---|---|---|---|---|
| Saskatchewan (Heidt) 🔨 | 0 | 2 | 1 | 0 | 0 | 0 | 0 | 2 | 0 | 1 | 6 |
| Nova Scotia (Daemen) | 0 | 0 | 0 | 1 | 1 | 1 | 2 | 0 | 0 | 0 | 5 |

| Sheet H | 1 | 2 | 3 | 4 | 5 | 6 | 7 | 8 | 9 | 10 | 11 | Final |
|---|---|---|---|---|---|---|---|---|---|---|---|---|
| New Brunswick (Mallais) 🔨 | 2 | 2 | 0 | 2 | 0 | 3 | 0 | 0 | 2 | 0 | 0 | 11 |
| Ontario (Maus) | 0 | 0 | 3 | 0 | 2 | 0 | 2 | 1 | 0 | 3 | 2 | 13 |

| Sheet J | 1 | 2 | 3 | 4 | 5 | 6 | 7 | 8 | 9 | 10 | Final |
|---|---|---|---|---|---|---|---|---|---|---|---|
| Manitoba (Bale) 🔨 | 2 | 0 | 0 | 2 | 0 | 1 | 0 | X | X | X | 5 |
| Quebec (Crete) | 0 | 3 | 3 | 0 | 4 | 0 | 2 | X | X | X | 12 |

| Sheet L | 1 | 2 | 3 | 4 | 5 | 6 | 7 | 8 | 9 | 10 | Final |
|---|---|---|---|---|---|---|---|---|---|---|---|
| Alberta (Thomas) 🔨 | 3 | 1 | 2 | 0 | 3 | 0 | 1 | X | X | X | 10 |
| Newfoundland and Labrador (Hamilton) | 0 | 0 | 0 | 1 | 0 | 0 | 0 | X | X | X | 1 |

==== Draw 9 ====
| Sheet A | 1 | 2 | 3 | 4 | 5 | 6 | 7 | 8 | 9 | 10 | Final |
|---|---|---|---|---|---|---|---|---|---|---|---|
| Quebec (Crete) 🔨 | 0 | 3 | 3 | 0 | 0 | 0 | 1 | X | X | X | 7 |
| Newfoundland and Labrador (Hamilton) | 0 | 0 | 0 | 0 | 0 | 1 | 0 | X | X | X | 1 |

| Sheet D | 1 | 2 | 3 | 4 | 5 | 6 | 7 | 8 | 9 | 10 | Final |
|---|---|---|---|---|---|---|---|---|---|---|---|
| Northwest Territories (Miller) 🔨 | 0 | 0 | 0 | 1 | 0 | 2 | 0 | 1 | 0 | 1 | 5 |
| Nova Scotia (Daemen) | 1 | 0 | 2 | 0 | 1 | 0 | 2 | 0 | 2 | 0 | 8 |

| Sheet F | 1 | 2 | 3 | 4 | 5 | 6 | 7 | 8 | 9 | 10 | Final |
|---|---|---|---|---|---|---|---|---|---|---|---|
| British Columbia (Griffith) 🔨 | 1 | 0 | 1 | 1 | 0 | 0 | 0 | 0 | 3 | X | 6 |
| Alberta (Thomas) | 0 | 0 | 0 | 0 | 2 | 1 | 1 | 0 | 0 | X | 4 |

| Sheet H | 1 | 2 | 3 | 4 | 5 | 6 | 7 | 8 | 9 | 10 | Final |
|---|---|---|---|---|---|---|---|---|---|---|---|
| Manitoba (Bale) 🔨 | 0 | 0 | 1 | 0 | 0 | 1 | 0 | 1 | 0 | X | 3 |
| Saskatchewan (Heidt) | 1 | 2 | 0 | 1 | 0 | 0 | 1 | 0 | 2 | X | 7 |

| Sheet J | 1 | 2 | 3 | 4 | 5 | 6 | 7 | 8 | 9 | 10 | Final |
|---|---|---|---|---|---|---|---|---|---|---|---|
| Northern Ontario (Sargent) 🔨 | 0 | 1 | 0 | 0 | 2 | 0 | 2 | 1 | 1 | X | 7 |
| Ontario (Maus) | 0 | 0 | 4 | 0 | 0 | 0 | 0 | 0 | 0 | X | 4 |

| Sheet K | 1 | 2 | 3 | 4 | 5 | 6 | 7 | 8 | 9 | 10 | Final |
|---|---|---|---|---|---|---|---|---|---|---|---|
| New Brunswick (Mallais) 🔨 | 1 | 5 | 2 | 0 | 0 | 4 | X | X | X | X | 12 |
| Yukon (Prosko) | 0 | 0 | 0 | 1 | 1 | 0 | X | X | X | X | 2 |

==== Draw 10 ====
| Sheet A | 1 | 2 | 3 | 4 | 5 | 6 | 7 | 8 | 9 | 10 | Final |
|---|---|---|---|---|---|---|---|---|---|---|---|
| Ontario (Maus) 🔨 | 1 | 0 | 3 | 0 | 1 | 0 | 1 | 0 | 1 | X | 7 |
| Alberta (Thomas) | 0 | 3 | 0 | 2 | 0 | 3 | 0 | 2 | 0 | X | 10 |

| Sheet D | 1 | 2 | 3 | 4 | 5 | 6 | 7 | 8 | 9 | 10 | Final |
|---|---|---|---|---|---|---|---|---|---|---|---|
| British Columbia (Griffith) 🔨 | 0 | 0 | 3 | 0 | 0 | 2 | 1 | 0 | 3 | X | 9 |
| Manitoba (Bale) | 0 | 1 | 0 | 1 | 0 | 0 | 0 | 1 | 0 | X | 3 |

| Sheet F | 1 | 2 | 3 | 4 | 5 | 6 | 7 | 8 | 9 | 10 | Final |
|---|---|---|---|---|---|---|---|---|---|---|---|
| Newfoundland and Labrador (Hamilton) 🔨 | 0 | 2 | 3 | 1 | 1 | 0 | 2 | 0 | 0 | 1 | 10 |
| New Brunswick (Mallais) | 0 | 0 | 0 | 0 | 0 | 3 | 0 | 2 | 2 | 0 | 7 |

| Sheet G | 1 | 2 | 3 | 4 | 5 | 6 | 7 | 8 | 9 | 10 | Final |
|---|---|---|---|---|---|---|---|---|---|---|---|
| Yukon (Prosko) 🔨 | 0 | 2 | 0 | 0 | 0 | 0 | 0 | X | X | X | 2 |
| Quebec (Crete) | 1 | 0 | 3 | 1 | 0 | 2 | 3 | X | X | X | 10 |

| Sheet J | 1 | 2 | 3 | 4 | 5 | 6 | 7 | 8 | 9 | 10 | Final |
|---|---|---|---|---|---|---|---|---|---|---|---|
| Saskatchewan (Heidt) 🔨 | 3 | 0 | 0 | 0 | 2 | 0 | 4 | 2 | X | X | 11 |
| Northwest Territories (Miller) | 0 | 0 | 0 | 1 | 0 | 2 | 0 | 0 | X | X | 3 |

| Sheet K | 1 | 2 | 3 | 4 | 5 | 6 | 7 | 8 | 9 | 10 | Final |
|---|---|---|---|---|---|---|---|---|---|---|---|
| Nova Scotia (Daemen) 🔨 | 1 | 0 | 0 | 2 | 0 | 1 | 1 | 0 | 0 | 2 | 7 |
| Prince Edward Island (Gallant) | 0 | 1 | 1 | 0 | 0 | 0 | 0 | 2 | 0 | 0 | 4 |

==== Draw 11 ====
| Sheet A | 1 | 2 | 3 | 4 | 5 | 6 | 7 | 8 | 9 | 10 | Final |
|---|---|---|---|---|---|---|---|---|---|---|---|
| Northwest Territories (Miller) 🔨 | 1 | 0 | 0 | 0 | 0 | 0 | 2 | X | X | X | 3 |
| Manitoba (Bale) | 0 | 3 | 2 | 0 | 5 | 0 | 0 | X | X | X | 10 |

| Sheet C | 1 | 2 | 3 | 4 | 5 | 6 | 7 | 8 | 9 | 10 | Final |
|---|---|---|---|---|---|---|---|---|---|---|---|
| Alberta (Thomas) 🔨 | 2 | 0 | 3 | 0 | 0 | 4 | X | X | X | X | 9 |
| Yukon (Prosko) | 0 | 1 | 0 | 1 | 1 | 0 | X | X | X | X | 3 |

| Sheet F | 1 | 2 | 3 | 4 | 5 | 6 | 7 | 8 | 9 | 10 | 11 | Final |
|---|---|---|---|---|---|---|---|---|---|---|---|---|
| Prince Edward Island (Gallant) 🔨 | 0 | 0 | 0 | 0 | 1 | 0 | 0 | 0 | 0 | 1 | 0 | 2 |
| Quebec (Crete) | 0 | 0 | 0 | 0 | 0 | 0 | 0 | 1 | 1 | 0 | 1 | 3 |

| Sheet G | 1 | 2 | 3 | 4 | 5 | 6 | 7 | 8 | 9 | 10 | Final |
|---|---|---|---|---|---|---|---|---|---|---|---|
| New Brunswick (Mallais) 🔨 | 0 | 1 | 1 | 0 | 1 | 2 | 1 | 0 | 1 | X | 7 |
| Northern Ontario (Sargent) | 0 | 0 | 0 | 2 | 0 | 0 | 0 | 2 | 0 | X | 4 |

| Sheet J | 1 | 2 | 3 | 4 | 5 | 6 | 7 | 8 | 9 | 10 | Final |
|---|---|---|---|---|---|---|---|---|---|---|---|
| Nova Scotia (Daemen) 🔨 | 1 | 0 | 0 | 0 | 0 | 0 | 2 | 0 | 2 | X | 5 |
| British Columbia (Griffith) | 0 | 0 | 0 | 0 | 0 | 1 | 0 | 2 | 0 | X | 3 |

| Sheet K | 1 | 2 | 3 | 4 | 5 | 6 | 7 | 8 | 9 | 10 | Final |
|---|---|---|---|---|---|---|---|---|---|---|---|
| Ontario (Maus) 🔨 | 2 | 2 | 2 | 3 | 0 | 3 | X | X | X | X | 12 |
| Newfoundland and Labrador (Hamilton) | 0 | 0 | 0 | 0 | 1 | 0 | X | X | X | X | 1 |

==== Draw 12 ====
| Sheet B | 1 | 2 | 3 | 4 | 5 | 6 | 7 | 8 | 9 | 10 | Final |
|---|---|---|---|---|---|---|---|---|---|---|---|
| Yukon (Prosko) 🔨 | 1 | 0 | 0 | 0 | 1 | 0 | 2 | 0 | 1 | X | 5 |
| British Columbia (Griffith) | 0 | 1 | 3 | 1 | 0 | 1 | 0 | 2 | 0 | X | 8 |

| Sheet C | 1 | 2 | 3 | 4 | 5 | 6 | 7 | 8 | 9 | 10 | Final |
|---|---|---|---|---|---|---|---|---|---|---|---|
| Newfoundland and Labrador (Hamilton) 🔨 | 1 | 0 | 0 | 0 | 0 | 0 | 0 | X | X | X | 1 |
| Prince Edward Island (Gallant) | 0 | 2 | 0 | 0 | 1 | 2 | 4 | X | X | X | 9 |

| Sheet F | 1 | 2 | 3 | 4 | 5 | 6 | 7 | 8 | 9 | 10 | Final |
|---|---|---|---|---|---|---|---|---|---|---|---|
| Northwest Territories (Miller) 🔨 | 0 | 0 | 0 | 1 | 0 | 0 | 0 | 0 | 1 | X | 2 |
| Northern Ontario (Sargent) | 1 | 1 | 0 | 0 | 2 | 1 | 2 | 1 | 0 | X | 8 |

| Sheet G | 1 | 2 | 3 | 4 | 5 | 6 | 7 | 8 | 9 | 10 | Final |
|---|---|---|---|---|---|---|---|---|---|---|---|
| Saskatchewan (Heidt) 🔨 | 1 | 0 | 1 | 0 | 1 | 0 | 0 | 1 | 3 | 0 | 7 |
| Ontario (Maus) | 0 | 1 | 0 | 1 | 0 | 3 | 2 | 0 | 0 | 2 | 9 |

| Sheet I | 1 | 2 | 3 | 4 | 5 | 6 | 7 | 8 | 9 | 10 | Final |
|---|---|---|---|---|---|---|---|---|---|---|---|
| Manitoba (Bale) 🔨 | 0 | 3 | 2 | 1 | 0 | 1 | 0 | 2 | 0 | X | 9 |
| New Brunswick (Mallais) | 1 | 0 | 0 | 0 | 1 | 0 | 3 | 0 | 2 | X | 7 |

| Sheet K | 1 | 2 | 3 | 4 | 5 | 6 | 7 | 8 | 9 | 10 | Final |
|---|---|---|---|---|---|---|---|---|---|---|---|
| Quebec (Crete) 🔨 | 0 | 2 | 0 | 0 | 0 | 0 | 2 | 1 | 0 | X | 5 |
| Alberta (Thomas) | 0 | 0 | 0 | 2 | 2 | 2 | 0 | 0 | 2 | X | 8 |

==== Draw 13 ====
| Sheet B | 1 | 2 | 3 | 4 | 5 | 6 | 7 | 8 | 9 | 10 | Final |
|---|---|---|---|---|---|---|---|---|---|---|---|
| Alberta (Thomas) 🔨 | 0 | 2 | 0 | 1 | 0 | 2 | 0 | 1 | 0 | X | 6 |
| New Brunswick (Mallais) | 0 | 0 | 0 | 0 | 1 | 0 | 1 | 0 | 2 | X | 4 |

| Sheet C | 1 | 2 | 3 | 4 | 5 | 6 | 7 | 8 | 9 | 10 | 11 | Final |
|---|---|---|---|---|---|---|---|---|---|---|---|---|
| Quebec (Crete) 🔨 | 0 | 0 | 0 | 0 | 0 | 1 | 0 | 2 | 1 | 1 | 0 | 5 |
| Nova Scotia (Daemen) | 0 | 0 | 0 | 1 | 2 | 0 | 2 | 0 | 0 | 0 | 1 | 6 |

| Sheet F | 1 | 2 | 3 | 4 | 5 | 6 | 7 | 8 | 9 | 10 | Final |
|---|---|---|---|---|---|---|---|---|---|---|---|
| Manitoba (Bale) 🔨 | 3 | 0 | 3 | 0 | 1 | 0 | 2 | 0 | 0 | 0 | 9 |
| Ontario (Maus) | 0 | 2 | 0 | 1 | 0 | 1 | 0 | 2 | 1 | 1 | 8 |

| Sheet H | 1 | 2 | 3 | 4 | 5 | 6 | 7 | 8 | 9 | 10 | Final |
|---|---|---|---|---|---|---|---|---|---|---|---|
| British Columbia (Griffith) 🔨 | 2 | 3 | 0 | 0 | 2 | 0 | 4 | 2 | X | X | 13 |
| Newfoundland and Labrador (Hamilton) | 0 | 0 | 2 | 1 | 0 | 2 | 0 | 0 | X | X | 5 |

| Sheet I | 1 | 2 | 3 | 4 | 5 | 6 | 7 | 8 | 9 | 10 | Final |
|---|---|---|---|---|---|---|---|---|---|---|---|
| Prince Edward Island (Gallant) 🔨 | 0 | 1 | 0 | 0 | 0 | 0 | 5 | 0 | 0 | 1 | 7 |
| Saskatchewan (Heidt) | 0 | 0 | 0 | 2 | 0 | 1 | 0 | 2 | 1 | 0 | 6 |

| Sheet L | 1 | 2 | 3 | 4 | 5 | 6 | 7 | 8 | 9 | 10 | Final |
|---|---|---|---|---|---|---|---|---|---|---|---|
| Northern Ontario (Sargent) 🔨 | 3 | 0 | 0 | 0 | 2 | 1 | 0 | 3 | X | X | 9 |
| Yukon (Prosko) | 0 | 0 | 1 | 1 | 0 | 0 | 1 | 0 | X | X | 3 |

=== Playoffs ===
| Semifinal | | Final |
| Alberta | 7 |
| Ontario | 6 | British Columbia | 2 |
| | | Alberta | 7 |

==== Semifinal ====
| Sheet K | 1 | 2 | 3 | 4 | 5 | 6 | 7 | 8 | 9 | 10 | Final |
|---|---|---|---|---|---|---|---|---|---|---|---|
| Ontario (Maus) | 0 | 1 | 0 | 1 | 1 | 0 | 2 | 0 | 1 | 0 | 6 |
| Alberta (Thomas) 🔨 | 1 | 0 | 2 | 0 | 0 | 2 | 0 | 1 | 0 | 1 | 7 |

Player percentages
| Ontario | | Alberta | |
|---|---|---|---|
| Bill Francis | 85% | Kyle Reynolds | 91% |
| Allan Stahl | 71% | Rollie Robinson | 79% |
| Jeff Grant | 71% | Geoff Walker | 88% |
| Codey Maus | 73% | Charley Thomas | 84% |
| Total | 75% | Total | 85% |

==== Final ====
| Sheet B | 1 | 2 | 3 | 4 | 5 | 6 | 7 | 8 | 9 | 10 | Final |
|---|---|---|---|---|---|---|---|---|---|---|---|
| Alberta (Thomas) | 0 | 0 | 1 | 1 | 0 | 0 | 2 | 2 | 1 | X | 7 |
| British Columbia (Griffith) 🔨 | 0 | 0 | 0 | 0 | 1 | 1 | 0 | 0 | 0 | X | 2 |

Player percentages
| Alberta | | British Columbia | |
|---|---|---|---|
| Kyle Reynolds | 89% | Mitchell Ursel | 84% |
| Rollie Robinson | 91% | Derek Ryan | 80% |
| Geoff Walker | 80% | Russ Koffski | 68% |
| Charley Thomas | 83% | Ty Griffith | 72% |
| Total | 86% | Total | 76% |

== Women's ==
=== Teams ===
| Province / Territory | Skip | Third | Second | Lead |
|---|---|---|---|---|
| Alberta | Megan Kirk | Teryn Hamilton | Jackie Peat | Lace Dupont |
| British Columbia | Kirsten Fox | Steph Jackson | Angela Miller | Erin Fox |
| Manitoba | Calleen Neufeld | Sabrina Neufeld | Laryssa Grenkow | Lindsay Edie |
| New Brunswick | Mary Jane McGuire | Megan McGuire | Ashley Howard | Sarah Berthelot |
| Newfoundland and Labrador | Stacie Devereaux | Steph Guzzwell | Sarah Paul | Julie Devereaux |
| Northern Ontario | Tracy Horgan | Lindsay Miners | Amanda Gates | Stephanie Barbeau |
| Northwest Territories | Kate Jefferson | Carina Sartor-Pielak | Melissa Weaver | Leslie Merrithew |
| Nova Scotia | Sarah Rhyno | Jenn Brine | Jessica Bradford | Heather Ross |
| Ontario | Lisa Farnell | Kim Brown | Darrelle Johnson | Amber Gebhardt |
| Prince Edward Island | Meaghan Hughes | Sinead Dolan | Michala Robison | Erika Nabuurs |
| Quebec | Lana Gosselin | Sophie Morissette (skip) | Vicky Tremblay | Isabelle Vallee |
| Saskatchewan | Mandy Selzer | Erin Selzer | Kristen Mitchell | Megan Selzer |

=== Standings ===
| Locale | Skip | W | L |
|---|---|---|---|
| Saskatchewan | Mandy Selzer | 8 | 3 |
| Manitoba | Calleen Neufeld | 8 | 3 |
| Northern Ontario | Tracy Horgan | 7 | 4 |
| Nova Scotia | Sarah Rhyno | 7 | 4 |
| Alberta | Megan Kirk | 6 | 5 |
| New Brunswick | Mary Jane McGuire | 5 | 6 |
| Newfoundland and Labrador | Stacie Devereaux | 5 | 6 |
| Ontario | Lisa Farnell | 5 | 6 |
| Northwest Territories | Kate Jefferson | 4 | 7 |
| British Columbia | Kirsten Fox | 4 | 7 |
| Quebec | Sophie Morissette | 4 | 7 |
| Prince Edward Island | Meaghan Hughes | 3 | 8 |

=== Results ===
==== Draw 1 ====
| Sheet A | 1 | 2 | 3 | 4 | 5 | 6 | 7 | 8 | 9 | 10 | Final |
|---|---|---|---|---|---|---|---|---|---|---|---|
| Nova Scotia (Rhyno) | 0 | 0 | 0 | 0 | 1 | 0 | 3 | 1 | 0 | X | 5 |
| Manitoba (Neufeld) 🔨 | 0 | 3 | 0 | 1 | 0 | 2 | 0 | 0 | 2 | X | 8 |

| Sheet C | 1 | 2 | 3 | 4 | 5 | 6 | 7 | 8 | 9 | 10 | Final |
|---|---|---|---|---|---|---|---|---|---|---|---|
| Northern Ontario (Horgan) | 0 | 0 | 3 | 0 | 1 | 3 | 0 | 5 | X | X | 12 |
| British Columbia (Fox) 🔨 | 0 | 2 | 0 | 1 | 0 | 0 | 2 | 0 | X | X | 5 |

| Sheet E | 1 | 2 | 3 | 4 | 5 | 6 | 7 | 8 | 9 | 10 | Final |
|---|---|---|---|---|---|---|---|---|---|---|---|
| Quebec (Morissette) | 1 | 0 | 3 | 1 | 0 | 0 | 0 | 0 | 2 | 2 | 9 |
| New Brunswick (McGuire) 🔨 | 0 | 2 | 0 | 0 | 1 | 1 | 0 | 1 | 0 | 0 | 5 |

| Sheet G | 1 | 2 | 3 | 4 | 5 | 6 | 7 | 8 | 9 | 10 | Final |
|---|---|---|---|---|---|---|---|---|---|---|---|
| Northwest Territories (Jefferson) 🔨 | 0 | 1 | 0 | 2 | 2 | 0 | 0 | 0 | 0 | 2 | 7 |
| Prince Edward Island (Hughes) | 0 | 0 | 2 | 0 | 0 | 1 | 1 | 1 | 1 | 0 | 6 |

| Sheet I | 1 | 2 | 3 | 4 | 5 | 6 | 7 | 8 | 9 | 10 | Final |
|---|---|---|---|---|---|---|---|---|---|---|---|
| Newfoundland and Labrador (Devereaux) 🔨 | 0 | 0 | 0 | 2 | 0 | 2 | 2 | 0 | 0 | X | 6 |
| Saskatchewan (Selzer) | 1 | 1 | 1 | 0 | 4 | 0 | 0 | 2 | 2 | X | 11 |

==== Draw 2 ====
| Sheet D | 1 | 2 | 3 | 4 | 5 | 6 | 7 | 8 | 9 | 10 | 11 | Final |
|---|---|---|---|---|---|---|---|---|---|---|---|---|
| Nova Scotia (Rhyno) 🔨 | 0 | 1 | 0 | 0 | 1 | 0 | 1 | 1 | 1 | 0 | 1 | 6 |
| Newfoundland and Labrador (Devereaux) | 0 | 0 | 2 | 1 | 0 | 1 | 0 | 0 | 0 | 1 | 0 | 5 |

| Sheet F | 1 | 2 | 3 | 4 | 5 | 6 | 7 | 8 | 9 | 10 | Final |
|---|---|---|---|---|---|---|---|---|---|---|---|
| Alberta (Kirk) 🔨 | 1 | 2 | 0 | 1 | 4 | 0 | 0 | 3 | X | X | 11 |
| Northwest Territories (Jefferson) | 0 | 0 | 1 | 0 | 0 | 1 | 1 | 0 | X | X | 3 |

| Sheet H | 1 | 2 | 3 | 4 | 5 | 6 | 7 | 8 | 9 | 10 | Final |
|---|---|---|---|---|---|---|---|---|---|---|---|
| Northern Ontario (Horgan) 🔨 | 0 | 1 | 0 | 0 | 0 | 2 | 1 | 0 | 1 | 0 | 5 |
| Manitoba (Neufeld) | 0 | 0 | 1 | 0 | 1 | 0 | 0 | 3 | 0 | 1 | 6 |

| Sheet J | 1 | 2 | 3 | 4 | 5 | 6 | 7 | 8 | 9 | 10 | Final |
|---|---|---|---|---|---|---|---|---|---|---|---|
| Ontario (Farnell) 🔨 | 0 | 1 | 0 | 1 | 0 | 2 | 1 | 0 | 0 | 2 | 7 |
| Quebec (Morissette) | 0 | 0 | 3 | 0 | 1 | 0 | 0 | 1 | 1 | 0 | 6 |

| Sheet L | 1 | 2 | 3 | 4 | 5 | 6 | 7 | 8 | 9 | 10 | 11 | Final |
|---|---|---|---|---|---|---|---|---|---|---|---|---|
| New Brunswick (McGuire) 🔨 | 1 | 0 | 4 | 0 | 1 | 0 | 1 | 0 | 2 | 0 | 1 | 10 |
| Prince Edward Island (Hughes) | 0 | 3 | 0 | 2 | 0 | 1 | 0 | 1 | 0 | 2 | 0 | 9 |

==== Draw 3 ====
| Sheet B | 1 | 2 | 3 | 4 | 5 | 6 | 7 | 8 | 9 | 10 | Final |
|---|---|---|---|---|---|---|---|---|---|---|---|
| Prince Edward Island (Hughes) 🔨 | 1 | 0 | 1 | 0 | 3 | 0 | 2 | 0 | 1 | X | 8 |
| British Columbia (Fox) | 0 | 1 | 0 | 3 | 0 | 1 | 0 | 0 | 0 | X | 5 |

| Sheet C | 1 | 2 | 3 | 4 | 5 | 6 | 7 | 8 | 9 | 10 | Final |
|---|---|---|---|---|---|---|---|---|---|---|---|
| Manitoba (Neufeld) 🔨 | 0 | 1 | 3 | 0 | 1 | 0 | 2 | 0 | 1 | X | 8 |
| Alberta (Kirk) | 1 | 0 | 0 | 1 | 0 | 2 | 0 | 1 | 0 | X | 5 |

| Sheet F | 1 | 2 | 3 | 4 | 5 | 6 | 7 | 8 | 9 | 10 | Final |
|---|---|---|---|---|---|---|---|---|---|---|---|
| Nova Scotia (Rhyno) 🔨 | 2 | 0 | 1 | 0 | 0 | 1 | 0 | 1 | 1 | 1 | 7 |
| Ontario (Farnell) | 0 | 2 | 0 | 1 | 1 | 0 | 2 | 0 | 0 | 0 | 6 |

| Sheet H | 1 | 2 | 3 | 4 | 5 | 6 | 7 | 8 | 9 | 10 | Final |
|---|---|---|---|---|---|---|---|---|---|---|---|
| Saskatchewan (Selzer) 🔨 | 0 | 0 | 1 | 0 | 2 | 1 | 0 | 1 | 1 | 0 | 6 |
| Quebec (Morissette) | 0 | 0 | 0 | 3 | 0 | 0 | 2 | 0 | 0 | 2 | 7 |

| Sheet L | 1 | 2 | 3 | 4 | 5 | 6 | 7 | 8 | 9 | 10 | Final |
|---|---|---|---|---|---|---|---|---|---|---|---|
| Newfoundland and Labrador (Devereaux) 🔨 | 0 | 1 | 1 | 0 | 3 | 0 | 2 | 0 | 3 | X | 10 |
| Northern Ontario (Horgan) | 0 | 0 | 0 | 2 | 0 | 2 | 0 | 2 | 0 | X | 6 |

==== Draw 4 ====
| Sheet A | 1 | 2 | 3 | 4 | 5 | 6 | 7 | 8 | 9 | 10 | Final |
|---|---|---|---|---|---|---|---|---|---|---|---|
| Quebec (Morissette) 🔨 | 0 | 0 | 3 | 0 | 0 | 1 | 1 | 0 | 1 | 0 | 6 |
| Northwest Territories (Jefferson) | 2 | 0 | 0 | 1 | 1 | 0 | 0 | 2 | 0 | 4 | 10 |

| Sheet D | 1 | 2 | 3 | 4 | 5 | 6 | 7 | 8 | 9 | 10 | 11 | Final |
|---|---|---|---|---|---|---|---|---|---|---|---|---|
| New Brunswick (McGuire) 🔨 | 1 | 1 | 1 | 0 | 0 | 4 | 0 | 1 | 0 | 0 | 0 | 8 |
| Saskatchewan (Selzer) | 0 | 0 | 0 | 1 | 1 | 0 | 3 | 0 | 1 | 2 | 1 | 9 |

| Sheet G | 1 | 2 | 3 | 4 | 5 | 6 | 7 | 8 | 9 | 10 | Final |
|---|---|---|---|---|---|---|---|---|---|---|---|
| Northern Ontario (Horgan) 🔨 | 1 | 0 | 3 | 1 | 3 | 0 | 1 | X | X | X | 9 |
| Nova Scotia (Rhyno) | 0 | 1 | 0 | 0 | 0 | 1 | 0 | X | X | X | 2 |

| Sheet I | 1 | 2 | 3 | 4 | 5 | 6 | 7 | 8 | 9 | 10 | Final |
|---|---|---|---|---|---|---|---|---|---|---|---|
| Alberta (Kirk) 🔨 | 0 | 0 | 0 | 0 | 2 | 0 | 5 | 0 | 4 | X | 11 |
| Prince Edward Island (Hughes) | 0 | 1 | 0 | 0 | 0 | 1 | 0 | 1 | 0 | X | 3 |

| Sheet L | 1 | 2 | 3 | 4 | 5 | 6 | 7 | 8 | 9 | 10 | Final |
|---|---|---|---|---|---|---|---|---|---|---|---|
| British Columbia (Fox) 🔨 | 0 | 0 | 1 | 0 | 1 | 1 | 1 | 3 | X | X | 7 |
| Ontario (Farnell) | 0 | 0 | 0 | 1 | 0 | 0 | 0 | 0 | X | X | 1 |

==== Draw 5 ====
| Sheet B | 1 | 2 | 3 | 4 | 5 | 6 | 7 | 8 | 9 | 10 | Final |
|---|---|---|---|---|---|---|---|---|---|---|---|
| Alberta (Kirk) 🔨 | 0 | 3 | 0 | 1 | 0 | 1 | 0 | 0 | 0 | 0 | 5 |
| Northern Ontario (Horgan) | 0 | 0 | 3 | 0 | 1 | 0 | 1 | 1 | 0 | 1 | 7 |

| Sheet D | 1 | 2 | 3 | 4 | 5 | 6 | 7 | 8 | 9 | 10 | 11 | Final |
|---|---|---|---|---|---|---|---|---|---|---|---|---|
| Ontario (Farnell) 🔨 | 2 | 0 | 0 | 2 | 2 | 0 | 0 | 0 | 0 | 0 | 2 | 8 |
| Northwest Territories (Jefferson) | 0 | 1 | 0 | 0 | 0 | 1 | 1 | 1 | 2 | 0 | 0 | 6 |

| Sheet F | 1 | 2 | 3 | 4 | 5 | 6 | 7 | 8 | 9 | 10 | Final |
|---|---|---|---|---|---|---|---|---|---|---|---|
| Saskatchewan (Selzer) 🔨 | 0 | 0 | 0 | 2 | 0 | 0 | 1 | 0 | 1 | X | 4 |
| British Columbia (Fox) | 1 | 0 | 0 | 0 | 0 | 1 | 0 | 0 | 0 | X | 2 |

| Sheet J | 1 | 2 | 3 | 4 | 5 | 6 | 7 | 8 | 9 | 10 | Final |
|---|---|---|---|---|---|---|---|---|---|---|---|
| Newfoundland and Labrador (Devereaux) 🔨 | 1 | 0 | 0 | 2 | 0 | 1 | X | X | X | X | 4 |
| Manitoba (Neufeld) | 0 | 4 | 2 | 0 | 4 | 0 | X | X | X | X | 10 |

| Sheet L | 1 | 2 | 3 | 4 | 5 | 6 | 7 | 8 | 9 | 10 | Final |
|---|---|---|---|---|---|---|---|---|---|---|---|
| New Brunswick (McGuire) 🔨 | 2 | 0 | 1 | 0 | 2 | 0 | 0 | 2 | 0 | X | 7 |
| Nova Scotia (Rhyno) | 0 | 2 | 0 | 1 | 0 | 2 | 3 | 0 | 2 | X | 10 |

==== Draw 6 ====
| Sheet A | 1 | 2 | 3 | 4 | 5 | 6 | 7 | 8 | 9 | 10 | Final |
|---|---|---|---|---|---|---|---|---|---|---|---|
| Ontario (Farnell) 🔨 | 2 | 0 | 3 | 1 | 0 | 0 | 1 | 0 | 0 | 0 | 7 |
| Prince Edward Island (Hughes) | 0 | 1 | 0 | 0 | 1 | 0 | 0 | 2 | 1 | 1 | 6 |

| Sheet F | 1 | 2 | 3 | 4 | 5 | 6 | 7 | 8 | 9 | 10 | Final |
|---|---|---|---|---|---|---|---|---|---|---|---|
| Northwest Territories (Jefferson) 🔨 | 0 | 2 | 0 | 1 | 1 | 0 | 3 | 3 | X | X | 10 |
| New Brunswick (McGuire) | 1 | 0 | 1 | 0 | 0 | 2 | 0 | 0 | X | X | 4 |

| Sheet G | 1 | 2 | 3 | 4 | 5 | 6 | 7 | 8 | 9 | 10 | Final |
|---|---|---|---|---|---|---|---|---|---|---|---|
| British Columbia (Fox) 🔨 | 2 | 0 | 2 | 0 | 1 | 0 | 1 | 0 | 2 | X | 8 |
| Quebec (Morissette) | 0 | 1 | 0 | 1 | 0 | 2 | 0 | 1 | 0 | X | 5 |

| Sheet J | 1 | 2 | 3 | 4 | 5 | 6 | 7 | 8 | 9 | 10 | Final |
|---|---|---|---|---|---|---|---|---|---|---|---|
| Nova Scotia (Rhyno) 🔨 | 2 | 0 | 2 | 0 | 0 | 2 | 0 | 0 | 0 | X | 6 |
| Alberta (Kirk) | 0 | 2 | 0 | 2 | 2 | 0 | 2 | 0 | 2 | X | 10 |

| Sheet K | 1 | 2 | 3 | 4 | 5 | 6 | 7 | 8 | 9 | 10 | Final |
|---|---|---|---|---|---|---|---|---|---|---|---|
| Northern Ontario (Horgan) 🔨 | 3 | 0 | 0 | 3 | 0 | 0 | 2 | 0 | 2 | 1 | 11 |
| Saskatchewan (Selzer) | 0 | 1 | 3 | 0 | 1 | 1 | 0 | 1 | 0 | 0 | 7 |

==== Draw 7 ====
| Sheet C | 1 | 2 | 3 | 4 | 5 | 6 | 7 | 8 | 9 | 10 | Final |
|---|---|---|---|---|---|---|---|---|---|---|---|
| Saskatchewan (Selzer) 🔨 | 1 | 0 | 0 | 1 | 0 | 1 | 0 | 0 | 1 | X | 4 |
| Alberta (Kirk) | 0 | 2 | 2 | 0 | 1 | 0 | 1 | 2 | 0 | X | 8 |

| Sheet F | 1 | 2 | 3 | 4 | 5 | 6 | 7 | 8 | 9 | 10 | Final |
|---|---|---|---|---|---|---|---|---|---|---|---|
| Quebec (Morissette) 🔨 | 0 | 0 | 1 | 0 | 1 | 0 | 2 | 0 | 4 | X | 8 |
| Northern Ontario (Horgan) | 1 | 0 | 0 | 0 | 0 | 3 | 0 | 1 | 0 | X | 5 |

| Sheet H | 1 | 2 | 3 | 4 | 5 | 6 | 7 | 8 | 9 | 10 | Final |
|---|---|---|---|---|---|---|---|---|---|---|---|
| Newfoundland and Labrador (Devereaux) 🔨 | 1 | 0 | 2 | 1 | 1 | 0 | 2 | 1 | 0 | X | 8 |
| Northwest Territories (Jefferson) | 0 | 1 | 0 | 0 | 0 | 2 | 0 | 0 | 1 | X | 4 |

| Sheet J | 1 | 2 | 3 | 4 | 5 | 6 | 7 | 8 | 9 | 10 | Final |
|---|---|---|---|---|---|---|---|---|---|---|---|
| British Columbia (Fox) 🔨 | 0 | 2 | 0 | 1 | 0 | 1 | 0 | 2 | 1 | 0 | 7 |
| New Brunswick (McGuire) | 0 | 0 | 2 | 0 | 2 | 0 | 2 | 0 | 0 | 2 | 8 |

| Sheet K | 1 | 2 | 3 | 4 | 5 | 6 | 7 | 8 | 9 | 10 | Final |
|---|---|---|---|---|---|---|---|---|---|---|---|
| Prince Edward Island (Hughes) 🔨 | 0 | 1 | 0 | 0 | 0 | 0 | 1 | 0 | X | X | 2 |
| Manitoba (Neufeld) | 1 | 0 | 2 | 0 | 2 | 1 | 0 | 1 | X | X | 7 |

==== Draw 8 ====
| Sheet A | 1 | 2 | 3 | 4 | 5 | 6 | 7 | 8 | 9 | 10 | Final |
|---|---|---|---|---|---|---|---|---|---|---|---|
| Northwest Territories (Jefferson) 🔨 | 0 | 0 | 2 | 0 | 1 | 0 | 2 | 1 | 1 | 1 | 8 |
| British Columbia (Fox) | 0 | 0 | 0 | 3 | 0 | 3 | 0 | 0 | 0 | 0 | 6 |

| Sheet D | 1 | 2 | 3 | 4 | 5 | 6 | 7 | 8 | 9 | 10 | Final |
|---|---|---|---|---|---|---|---|---|---|---|---|
| Prince Edward Island (Hughes) 🔨 | 2 | 0 | 3 | 0 | 1 | 0 | 1 | 2 | X | X | 9 |
| Northern Ontario (Horgan) | 0 | 1 | 0 | 1 | 0 | 1 | 0 | 0 | X | X | 3 |

| Sheet E | 1 | 2 | 3 | 4 | 5 | 6 | 7 | 8 | 9 | 10 | Final |
|---|---|---|---|---|---|---|---|---|---|---|---|
| Saskatchewan (Selzer) 🔨 | 3 | 0 | 2 | 0 | 2 | 2 | 4 | X | X | X | 13 |
| Nova Scotia (Rhyno) | 0 | 2 | 0 | 1 | 0 | 0 | 0 | X | X | X | 3 |

| Sheet G | 1 | 2 | 3 | 4 | 5 | 6 | 7 | 8 | 9 | 10 | Final |
|---|---|---|---|---|---|---|---|---|---|---|---|
| New Brunswick (McGuire) 🔨 | 2 | 1 | 1 | 1 | 2 | 0 | 1 | 0 | 0 | 1 | 9 |
| Ontario (Farnell) | 0 | 0 | 0 | 0 | 0 | 2 | 0 | 2 | 1 | 0 | 5 |

| Sheet I | 1 | 2 | 3 | 4 | 5 | 6 | 7 | 8 | 9 | 10 | Final |
|---|---|---|---|---|---|---|---|---|---|---|---|
| Manitoba (Neufeld) 🔨 | 0 | 1 | 0 | 0 | 1 | 1 | 0 | 2 | 1 | X | 6 |
| Quebec (Morissette) | 2 | 0 | 3 | 2 | 0 | 0 | 1 | 0 | 0 | X | 8 |

| Sheet K | 1 | 2 | 3 | 4 | 5 | 6 | 7 | 8 | 9 | 10 | Final |
|---|---|---|---|---|---|---|---|---|---|---|---|
| Alberta (Kirk) 🔨 | 0 | 0 | 0 | 0 | 2 | 0 | 1 | 1 | 0 | 1 | 5 |
| Newfoundland and Labrador (Devereaux) | 1 | 0 | 1 | 0 | 0 | 1 | 0 | 0 | 1 | 0 | 4 |

==== Draw 9 ====
| Sheet B | 1 | 2 | 3 | 4 | 5 | 6 | 7 | 8 | 9 | 10 | Final |
|---|---|---|---|---|---|---|---|---|---|---|---|
| Quebec (Morissette) 🔨 | 0 | 0 | 2 | 0 | 1 | 0 | 0 | 2 | 1 | 0 | 6 |
| Newfoundland and Labrador (Devereaux) | 0 | 1 | 0 | 1 | 0 | 1 | 3 | 0 | 0 | 3 | 9 |

| Sheet C | 1 | 2 | 3 | 4 | 5 | 6 | 7 | 8 | 9 | 10 | Final |
|---|---|---|---|---|---|---|---|---|---|---|---|
| Northwest Territories (Jefferson) 🔨 | 0 | 0 | 1 | 0 | 0 | 1 | 0 | 0 | X | X | 2 |
| Nova Scotia (Rhyno) | 0 | 3 | 0 | 1 | 2 | 0 | 2 | 2 | X | X | 10 |

| Sheet E | 1 | 2 | 3 | 4 | 5 | 6 | 7 | 8 | 9 | 10 | Final |
|---|---|---|---|---|---|---|---|---|---|---|---|
| British Columbia (Fox) 🔨 | 1 | 2 | 0 | 4 | 0 | 2 | 1 | 0 | 0 | 5 | 15 |
| Alberta (Kirk) | 0 | 0 | 2 | 0 | 2 | 0 | 0 | 2 | 3 | 0 | 9 |

| Sheet G | 1 | 2 | 3 | 4 | 5 | 6 | 7 | 8 | 9 | 10 | Final |
|---|---|---|---|---|---|---|---|---|---|---|---|
| Manitoba (Neufeld) 🔨 | 0 | 0 | 0 | 1 | 2 | 0 | 1 | 1 | 0 | 0 | 5 |
| Saskatchewan (Selzer) | 1 | 1 | 1 | 0 | 0 | 1 | 0 | 0 | 0 | 4 | 8 |

| Sheet I | 1 | 2 | 3 | 4 | 5 | 6 | 7 | 8 | 9 | 10 | Final |
|---|---|---|---|---|---|---|---|---|---|---|---|
| Northern Ontario (Horgan) 🔨 | 0 | 3 | 0 | 2 | 0 | 1 | 0 | 3 | X | X | 9 |
| Ontario (Farnell) | 0 | 0 | 1 | 0 | 1 | 0 | 2 | 0 | X | X | 4 |

==== Draw 10 ====
| Sheet B | 1 | 2 | 3 | 4 | 5 | 6 | 7 | 8 | 9 | 10 | Final |
|---|---|---|---|---|---|---|---|---|---|---|---|
| Ontario (Farnell) | 0 | 1 | 0 | 3 | 0 | 2 | 0 | 2 | X | X | 8 |
| Alberta (Kirk) 🔨 | 0 | 0 | 0 | 0 | 1 | 0 | 1 | 0 | X | X | 2 |

| Sheet C | 1 | 2 | 3 | 4 | 5 | 6 | 7 | 8 | 9 | 10 | Final |
|---|---|---|---|---|---|---|---|---|---|---|---|
| British Columbia (Fox) 🔨 | 1 | 0 | 1 | 0 | 1 | 1 | 0 | 0 | 0 | 0 | 4 |
| Manitoba (Neufeld) | 0 | 1 | 0 | 1 | 0 | 0 | 1 | 1 | 0 | 4 | 8 |

| Sheet E | 1 | 2 | 3 | 4 | 5 | 6 | 7 | 8 | 9 | 10 | Final |
|---|---|---|---|---|---|---|---|---|---|---|---|
| Newfoundland and Labrador (Devereaux) 🔨 | 2 | 0 | 2 | 1 | 0 | 0 | 3 | 0 | 1 | X | 9 |
| New Brunswick (McGuire) | 0 | 0 | 0 | 0 | 2 | 1 | 0 | 2 | 0 | X | 5 |

| Sheet I | 1 | 2 | 3 | 4 | 5 | 6 | 7 | 8 | 9 | 10 | Final |
|---|---|---|---|---|---|---|---|---|---|---|---|
| Saskatchewan (Selzer) 🔨 | 1 | 0 | 1 | 1 | 1 | 0 | 0 | 0 | 1 | 3 | 8 |
| Northwest Territories (Jefferson) | 0 | 1 | 0 | 0 | 0 | 1 | 1 | 1 | 0 | 0 | 4 |

| Sheet L | 1 | 2 | 3 | 4 | 5 | 6 | 7 | 8 | 9 | 10 | Final |
|---|---|---|---|---|---|---|---|---|---|---|---|
| Nova Scotia (Rhyno) 🔨 | 0 | 0 | 1 | 1 | 0 | 0 | 0 | 2 | 0 | 3 | 7 |
| Prince Edward Island (Hughes) | 0 | 0 | 0 | 0 | 2 | 1 | 1 | 0 | 0 | 0 | 4 |

==== Draw 11 ====
| Sheet B | 1 | 2 | 3 | 4 | 5 | 6 | 7 | 8 | 9 | 10 | Final |
|---|---|---|---|---|---|---|---|---|---|---|---|
| Northwest Territories (Jefferson) 🔨 | 0 | 2 | 1 | 0 | 1 | 0 | 0 | 2 | 0 | 0 | 6 |
| Manitoba (Neufeld) | 0 | 0 | 0 | 1 | 0 | 3 | 2 | 0 | 1 | 1 | 8 |

| Sheet E | 1 | 2 | 3 | 4 | 5 | 6 | 7 | 8 | 9 | 10 | Final |
|---|---|---|---|---|---|---|---|---|---|---|---|
| Prince Edward Island (Hughes) 🔨 | 1 | 0 | 0 | 0 | 0 | 2 | 0 | 2 | 2 | 1 | 8 |
| Quebec (Morissette) | 0 | 0 | 2 | 1 | 2 | 0 | 1 | 0 | 0 | 0 | 6 |

| Sheet H | 1 | 2 | 3 | 4 | 5 | 6 | 7 | 8 | 9 | 10 | 11 | Final |
|---|---|---|---|---|---|---|---|---|---|---|---|---|
| New Brunswick (McGuire) 🔨 | 0 | 4 | 0 | 2 | 0 | 0 | 0 | 0 | 3 | 1 | 0 | 10 |
| Northern Ontario (Horgan) | 1 | 0 | 1 | 0 | 2 | 2 | 2 | 2 | 0 | 0 | 2 | 12 |

| Sheet I | 1 | 2 | 3 | 4 | 5 | 6 | 7 | 8 | 9 | 10 | Final |
|---|---|---|---|---|---|---|---|---|---|---|---|
| Nova Scotia (Rhyno) 🔨 | 1 | 0 | 2 | 2 | 0 | 3 | 0 | 2 | 0 | X | 10 |
| British Columbia (Fox) | 0 | 2 | 0 | 0 | 2 | 0 | 2 | 0 | 1 | X | 7 |

| Sheet L | 1 | 2 | 3 | 4 | 5 | 6 | 7 | 8 | 9 | 10 | 11 | Final |
|---|---|---|---|---|---|---|---|---|---|---|---|---|
| Ontario (Farnell) 🔨 | 0 | 0 | 2 | 1 | 2 | 0 | 0 | 1 | 0 | 0 | 1 | 7 |
| Newfoundland and Labrador (Devereaux) | 1 | 1 | 0 | 0 | 0 | 1 | 1 | 0 | 1 | 1 | 0 | 6 |

==== Draw 12 ====
| Sheet D | 1 | 2 | 3 | 4 | 5 | 6 | 7 | 8 | 9 | 10 | Final |
|---|---|---|---|---|---|---|---|---|---|---|---|
| Newfoundland and Labrador (Devereaux) 🔨 | 1 | 3 | 2 | 0 | 1 | 0 | 1 | X | X | X | 8 |
| Prince Edward Island (Hughes) | 0 | 0 | 0 | 0 | 0 | 1 | 0 | X | X | X | 1 |

| Sheet E | 1 | 2 | 3 | 4 | 5 | 6 | 7 | 8 | 9 | 10 | 11 | Final |
|---|---|---|---|---|---|---|---|---|---|---|---|---|
| Northwest Territories (Jefferson) 🔨 | 0 | 0 | 1 | 0 | 4 | 0 | 1 | 0 | 0 | 0 | 0 | 6 |
| Northern Ontario (Horgan) | 1 | 0 | 0 | 1 | 0 | 1 | 0 | 1 | 1 | 1 | 1 | 7 |

| Sheet H | 1 | 2 | 3 | 4 | 5 | 6 | 7 | 8 | 9 | 10 | 11 | Final |
|---|---|---|---|---|---|---|---|---|---|---|---|---|
| Saskatchewan (Selzer) 🔨 | 1 | 0 | 0 | 0 | 0 | 2 | 0 | 1 | 1 | 1 | 2 | 8 |
| Ontario (Farnell) | 0 | 1 | 2 | 1 | 0 | 0 | 2 | 0 | 0 | 0 | 0 | 6 |

| Sheet J | 1 | 2 | 3 | 4 | 5 | 6 | 7 | 8 | 9 | 10 | Final |
|---|---|---|---|---|---|---|---|---|---|---|---|
| Manitoba (Neufeld) 🔨 | 3 | 0 | 1 | 0 | 1 | 0 | 0 | 1 | 0 | 1 | 7 |
| New Brunswick (McGuire) | 0 | 2 | 0 | 2 | 0 | 1 | 1 | 0 | 2 | 0 | 8 |

| Sheet L | 1 | 2 | 3 | 4 | 5 | 6 | 7 | 8 | 9 | 10 | Final |
|---|---|---|---|---|---|---|---|---|---|---|---|
| Quebec (Morissette) 🔨 | 2 | 0 | 0 | 4 | 0 | 0 | 2 | 0 | 0 | X | 8 |
| Alberta (Kirk) | 0 | 2 | 1 | 0 | 2 | 2 | 0 | 2 | 3 | X | 12 |

==== Draw 13 ====
| Sheet A | 1 | 2 | 3 | 4 | 5 | 6 | 7 | 8 | 9 | 10 | Final |
|---|---|---|---|---|---|---|---|---|---|---|---|
| Alberta (Kirk) 🔨 | 0 | 0 | 0 | 1 | 0 | 1 | 1 | 1 | 0 | X | 4 |
| New Brunswick (McGuire) | 0 | 1 | 1 | 0 | 3 | 0 | 0 | 0 | 2 | X | 7 |

| Sheet D | 1 | 2 | 3 | 4 | 5 | 6 | 7 | 8 | 9 | 10 | Final |
|---|---|---|---|---|---|---|---|---|---|---|---|
| Quebec (Morissette) 🔨 | 0 | 1 | 0 | 0 | 2 | 0 | 2 | 0 | 0 | X | 5 |
| Nova Scotia (Rhyno) | 0 | 0 | 1 | 1 | 0 | 5 | 0 | 1 | 3 | X | 11 |

| Sheet E | 1 | 2 | 3 | 4 | 5 | 6 | 7 | 8 | 9 | 10 | Final |
|---|---|---|---|---|---|---|---|---|---|---|---|
| Manitoba (Neufeld) 🔨 | 1 | 1 | 0 | 0 | 2 | 0 | 5 | 0 | X | X | 9 |
| Ontario (Farnell) | 0 | 0 | 1 | 0 | 0 | 2 | 0 | 2 | X | X | 5 |

| Sheet G | 1 | 2 | 3 | 4 | 5 | 6 | 7 | 8 | 9 | 10 | Final |
|---|---|---|---|---|---|---|---|---|---|---|---|
| British Columbia (Fox) 🔨 | 2 | 3 | 0 | 1 | 0 | 0 | 4 | X | X | X | 10 |
| Newfoundland and Labrador (Devereaux) | 0 | 0 | 1 | 0 | 2 | 1 | 0 | X | X | X | 4 |

| Sheet J | 1 | 2 | 3 | 4 | 5 | 6 | 7 | 8 | 9 | 10 | Final |
|---|---|---|---|---|---|---|---|---|---|---|---|
| Prince Edward Island (Hughes) 🔨 | 0 | 0 | 0 | 0 | 2 | 0 | 1 | 0 | 1 | X | 4 |
| Saskatchewan (Selzer) | 1 | 1 | 1 | 1 | 0 | 1 | 0 | 1 | 0 | X | 6 |

=== Playoffs ===
| Tiebreaker | | Semifinal | | Final |
| Northern Ontario | 4 |
| Nova Scotia | 9 | Manitoba | 10 |
| | | Nova Scotia | 6 |
| | | | | Saskatchewan | 10 |
| | | | | Manitoba | 6 |

==== Tiebreaker ====
| Sheet K | 1 | 2 | 3 | 4 | 5 | 6 | 7 | 8 | 9 | 10 | Final |
|---|---|---|---|---|---|---|---|---|---|---|---|
| Northern Ontario (Horgan) | 1 | 0 | 1 | 0 | 1 | 0 | 0 | 1 | 0 | X | 4 |
| Nova Scotia (Rhyno) 🔨 | 0 | 2 | 0 | 3 | 0 | 2 | 1 | 0 | 1 | X | 9 |

Player percentages
| Northern Ontario | | Nova Scotia | |
|---|---|---|---|
| Stephanie Barbeau | 65% | Heather Ross | 83% |
| Amanda Gates | 65% | Jessica Bradford | 69% |
| Lindsay Miners | 76% | Jenn Brine | 74% |
| Tracy Horgan | 50% | Sarah Rhyno | 75% |
| Total | 64% | Total | 75% |

==== Semifinal ====
| Sheet I | 1 | 2 | 3 | 4 | 5 | 6 | 7 | 8 | 9 | 10 | Final |
|---|---|---|---|---|---|---|---|---|---|---|---|
| Nova Scotia (Rhyno) | 0 | 2 | 0 | 1 | 0 | 1 | 1 | 1 | 0 | 0 | 6 |
| Manitoba (Neufeld) 🔨 | 4 | 0 | 2 | 0 | 1 | 0 | 0 | 0 | 1 | 2 | 10 |

Player percentages
| Nova Scotia | | Manitoba | |
|---|---|---|---|
| Heather Ross | 93% | Lindsay Edie | 73% |
| Jessica Bradford | 71% | Laryssa Grenkow | 69% |
| Jenn Brine | 81% | Sabrina Neufeld | 84% |
| Sarah Rhyno | 64% | Calleen Neufeld | 83% |
| Total | 77% | Total | 77% |

==== Final ====
| Sheet B | 1 | 2 | 3 | 4 | 5 | 6 | 7 | 8 | 9 | 10 | Final |
|---|---|---|---|---|---|---|---|---|---|---|---|
| Saskatchewan (Selzer) 🔨 | 1 | 0 | 4 | 0 | 1 | 1 | 0 | 0 | 3 | X | 10 |
| Manitoba (Neufeld) | 0 | 1 | 0 | 4 | 0 | 0 | 1 | 0 | 0 | X | 6 |

Player percentages
| Saskatchewan | | Manitoba | |
|---|---|---|---|
| Megan Selzer | 76% | Lindsay Edie | 78% |
| Kristen Mitchell | 79% | Laryssa Grenkow | 80% |
| Erin Selzer | 79% | Sabrina Neufeld | 70% |
| Mandy Selzer | 84% | Calleen Neufeld | 61% |
| Total | 80% | Total | 72% |

== Qualification ==
=== Ontario ===
The Teranet Ontario Junior Curling Championships were held January 4-8 at the Tam Heather Curling & Tennis Club in Toronto.

Lisa Farnell of Peterborough defeated Laura Payne from the Prescott Curling Club 5-3 in the women's final. Payne had beaten the Brit O'Neill rink from the Glendale club in Hamilton 5-4 in the semifinals. Payne made it to the semis by defeating Laura Hickey of Toronto's Avonlea club, 9-2 in a tiebreaker.

In the men's final, Codey Maus out of the Dixie Club in Mississauga defeated Mike Anderson of Guelph 9-5. Anderson had beaten Chris Gardner from the Carleton Heights club in Ottawa 7-4 in the semifinal.
