= Burnaby Refinery =

Canadian oil refinery

Coordinates: 49°17′27″N 122°59′48″W

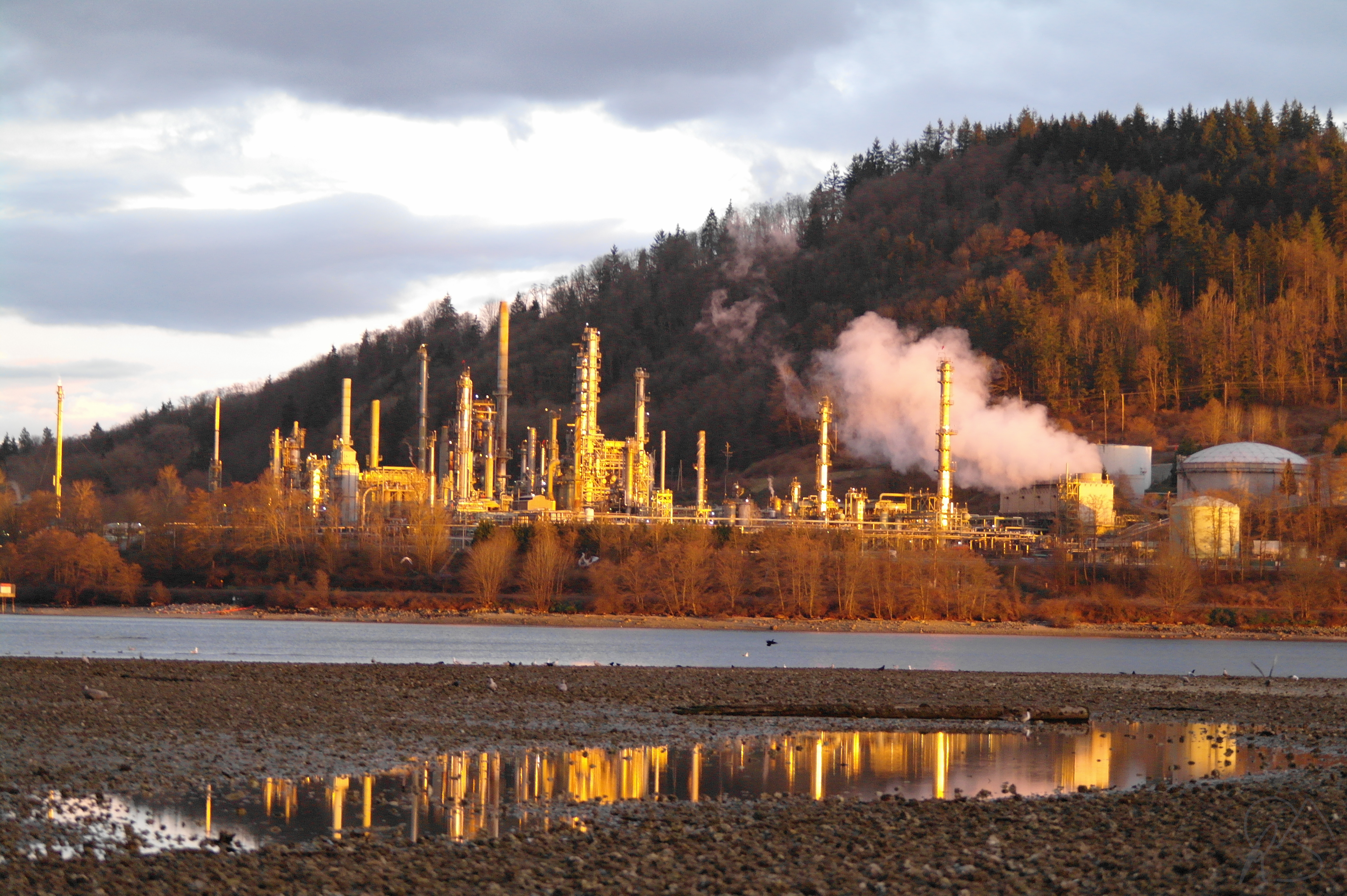
- Interactive map of Burnaby Refinery
- Location: Burnaby, British Columbia, Canada

Refinery details
- Operator: Sunoco
- Owner: Sunoco
- Opened: 1935
- Capacity: 55,000 barrels per day (8,700 m^{3}/d)
- No. of employees: 500 (2021)
- No. of oil tanks: 45
- Refining center: Burnaby

The Burnaby Refinery is an oil refinery located in the city of Burnaby, British Columbia, Canada owned by Sunoco LP. The facility refines crude and synthetic oil into gasoline, diesel, jet fuels, asphalts, heating oil, heavy fuel oil, butane, and propane. Crude oil is supplied to the facility from Northern British Columbia and Alberta through the Canadian government-owned 1,200-kilometre Trans Mountain Pipeline formerly owned by Kinder Morgan The refinery is divided into Area 1 (the original site) now used for offices and oil storage and Area 2 the modern refining area. The refinery has a Nelson Complexity Index of 9.1 Former and original owner-operator Chevron sold its Canadian assets to Parkland Fuel for C$1.46 billion ($1.09 billion) in April 2017, including 129 gasoline stations, three terminals and the Burnaby oil refinery. According to the Oil & Gas Journal, the refinery completed a major turnaround in spring 2020.

The refinery once again came under American ownership following Texas-based Sunoco LP's acquisition of Parkland in 2025.

== History ==
The refinery was established in 1935 by Standard Oil of California as one of few heavy industries in the area at that time, with a refining capacity 2,000 barrels per day (320 m^{3}/d). Major expansion took place during the-mid 1950s, increasing capacity to 11,000 barrels per day (1,700 m^{3}/d) as part of the post-war building boom in British Columbia. Further capacity increases during the mid-1970s brought refining capacity to 35,000 barrels per day (5,600 m^{3}/d). Other lower mainland refineries were converted to terminals in the early 1990s with production transferred to Alberta.
