= Sparling's Propane =

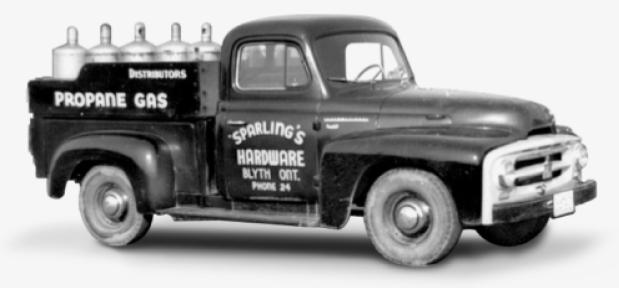
- Company type: Subsidiary
- Industry: Fuel Retailing
- Founded: August 13, 1951
- Founder: Grant R. Sparling
- Fate: Sold to Parkland Corporation in 2013, subsequently sold to Avenir Energy in 2024
- Headquarters: Blyth, Ontario
- Number of locations: 6 Branches (2024)
- Area served: Ontario, Canada
- Products: Propane
- Owner: Avenir Energy
- Website: https://www.sparlings.com/

Sparling's Propane is Canada's oldest propane retailer. Founded in 1951 by Grant Sparling, Sparling's grew to be one of Canada's largest propane companies. Sparling's is headquartered in Blyth Ontario and continues to operate from six locations throughout the province.

In 2013 Sparling's was sold to Parkland Corporation (TSX : PKI). In 2024 Parkland sold their propane division (including Sparling's) to Avenir Energy Ltd.

Sparling's Propane was named one of “Canada's Top Small & Medium Employers” by The Globe and Mail newspaper in 2007 and 2008.
