= National Convenience Stores =

National Convenience Stores Incorporated (NYSE: NCS) is a convenience store company headquartered in Houston, Texas. Its primary subsidiary, Stop-N-Go Foods Inc., is/was the company controlling the convenience stores.

== History ==
F. J. Dyke, Jr., a former executive of the convenience store chain UtoteM, purchased five San Antonio Stop N Go stores from Sommers Drug Stores and founded his own UtoteM franchise in 1959, changing the Stop N Go stores to UtoteM of San Antonio. Dyke and his business partners took control of all UtoteM locations in California in 1961. The company name changed to National Drive-In Grocery Corporation in 1962. In 1965 the headquarters moved to Houston. The performance of the company was good until an economic decline of the economy of Texas in the 1980s.

Around 1987, the company bought 272 7-Elevens in Houston from Southland Corporation for $250,000 (equivalent to $708,479.79 in 2025) per store. In 1988, the company bought 79 7-Eleven stores in San Antonio. It already had 125 San Antonio stores, making it the largest operator of convenience stores in that city, before its purchase of the 7-Elevens.

In 1991, the company owned 986 convenience stores in the U.S. states of Texas, California, and Georgia, all operated by it as "Stop-N-Go", and it had 6,300 employees. It was the largest operator of convenience stores in Houston and San Antonio. In the fiscal year of 1991, National Convenience Stores lost $10.5 million. In the first quarter of the next fiscal year, National Convenience Stores lost $3 million. The company filed for Chapter 11 bankruptcy protection that year.

In 1992, Houston restaurateur Ghulam Bombaywala acquired one million shares, or 5%, of National Convenience Stores.

In 1995, there were 660 Stop N Go stores, with all of them in Texas, including 396 Stop N Go stores in Houston, making it the largest convenience store chain in the city. At that time, 250 people worked in the company headquarters. In 1995, Diamond Shamrock bought Stop N Go for $260 million. The plans called for the combined company to be headquartered in San Antonio. The combined company years later became part of Valero Energy Corporation's retail business as its CornerStore (later spun off as CST Brands, now part of Laval, Quebec-based Alimentation Couche-Tard since 2017 - as a result, Couche-Tard subsidiary Circle K (which purchased UtoteM back in 1984) now owns the retail assets of CornerStore and its past assets, which has become in fact a spiritual merger of two past UtoteM franchises (the Houston and San Antonio franchises that became Stop N Go) came full circle.

In the 1990s, the company took out secret life insurance policies on employees. Upon discovering them, the families of employees killed on the job sued to get the money back. In 2002, National Convenience and Lloyd's of London settled with three families, paying them a total of $1,140,000 (equivalent to $2,040,610.55 in 2025).
