= Parkland Corporation =

Canadian fuel and convenience chain

- Formerly: Parkland Beef Industries; Parkland Industries; Parkland Fuel Corporation
- Type: Subsidiary
- Traded as: TSX: PKI; S&P/TSX Composite Component
- Industry: Retail (Convenience stores); Fuel Retailing
- Founder: Jack Donald
- Headquarters: Calgary, Alberta, Canada
- Key people: Bob Espey (president and CEO); Jorge Jimenez Neubauer Torres (chairman and Chief Investment Officer)
- Brands: Chevron (Canadian retail); Corner Store; 59th Street Food Company; On the Run; RaceTrac Gas; Superpumper
- Owner: Sunoco LP
- Subsidiaries: Fas Gas Plus; Pioneer Energy; Ultramar; M&M Food Market
- Website: www.parkland.ca/en

Parkland Corporation (formerly Parkland Fuel Corporation) is a Canadian energy and retail company based in Calgary, Alberta, acquired in 2025 by Sunoco LP. (Note: Sunoco LP is a U.S.-based petroleum business historically connected to, but no longer affiliated with, Suncor Energy. Suncor previously operated Sunoco-branded gas stations in Canada; most were rebranded to Petro-Canada in 2009.) Parkland operates gas stations under the in-house Pioneer, Ultramar, and Fas Gas Plus brands, and is also a franchisee of Imperial Oil's Esso banner, and U.S. chain Chevron. The company holds the rights to the convenience store brand On the Run in Canada and most of the United States, and franchises White Spot's fast food restaurant chain Triple O's in Alberta, British Columbia, and Ontario. Parkland also operates commercial oil and gas businesses under the Bluewave Energy, Columbia Fuels, Sparlings, and Ultramar brands.

At the time of its acquisition, it was the largest independent fuel retailing company in Canada, as well as the second-largest convenience store operator. Prior to its acquisition, it was listed on the Toronto Stock Exchange, with a market capitalization of $3.9 billion as of March 2018.

== History ==
Parkland Industries was founded as Parkland Beef Industries, a publicly traded cattle feedlot. In 1975, it was acquired by Jack Donald, and renamed Parkland Industries. Donald had previously founded and sold a chain of retail gas stations called Parkland Oil Products Ltd. At Parkland Industries, Donald pivoted the company from cattle to fuel retailing; it established Fas Gas Plus, a western Canadian gas station chain, in 1977. In its early years, the company was headquartered in Red Deer, Alberta; it moved to Calgary in the mid-2010s.

In the following 30 years, the company grew significantly, in the context of offloading of retail gas operations by larger, integrated oil companies. By the end of 2012, the company had 720 gas stations and $4.1 billion in annual revenue. In 2010, it renamed itself Parkland Fuel Corporation.

In 2013, Parkland acquired Elbow River Marketing, with 1,400 rail cars. In April 2013, the company purchased Sparling's Propane, a Southwestern Ontario propane retailer, followed by North Dakota-based SPF Energy in November 2013, expanding its footprint in the Northern Tier.

In late 2014, it announced the acquisition of Pioneer Energy, an Ontario gas station chain with 393 stations, for $378 million. The purchase came as part of a larger acquisition strategy by the company, and expanded its retail footprint to 1,000 gas stations nationwide.

In August 2016, the company announced the acquisition of most of CST Brands' Canadian assets for $965 million, as part of that company's acquisition by Alimentation Couche-Tard for $4 billion. This included the majority of the Ultramar chain, including 490 retail locations and 72 cardlocks in Ontario, Quebec and Atlantic Canada. The sale gave Parkland a total of just over 1,500 retail locations.

As part of Imperial Oil's exit from retail location ownership, Parkland also acquired the remaining On the Run franchise network, Canadian trademarks, and 17 Esso-branded gas stations.

In 2017, Parkland acquired Chevron's Canadian downstream fuel operations for $1.5 billion. As part of the deal, the company acquired the Burnaby Refinery in Burnaby, British Columbia, and 129 Chevron gas stations in the province; this expanded Parkland's retail footprint to 1,800 locations. It also acquired the

In October 2018, Parkland announced it would acquire 75% of SOL Investments, a retail gas station operator based in the Caribbean, for $1.57 billion. As a result of the acquisition, Simpson Oil took ownership of a 20% stake in Parkland.

In February 2020, Parkland renewed its agreement with British Columbia-based restaurant chain White Spot to operate Triple-O's locations as part of its Town Pantry (Chevron) and On the Run-branded convenience stores, with plans to extend the chain into Alberta and Ontario. That year, the company renamed itself Parkland Corporation.

In September 2020, Parkland USA acquired from Couche-Tard the rights to the On the Run brand in most U.S. states, with an intent to further-expand the chain into a North American operation.

In 2021, Parkland acquired 156 gas stations from Husky Energy for $156 million. These stations are located on Vancouver Island as well as the metropolitan areas of Calgary, Toronto, and Vancouver, and were converted to Parkland's various banners and franchises.

In January 2022, Parkland acquired frozen-food retailer M&M Food Market for $332 million. The purchase was part of a broader foray into food service by Parkland, in order to diversify its business beyond fuel retail (especially amid the growth of the electric vehicle market). Parkland planned to offer M&M products as part of On the Run's product line, while also maintaining its standalone locations and other distribution agreements. In late-October 2022, Parkland announced a deal with U.S.-based EV charger company FreeWire Technologies to install EV chargers at 25 locations across British Columbia.

Parkland has faced calls from activist investor Engine Capital and stakeholder Simpson Oil for the sale of non-core assets, restructuring operations to improve value, and prioritising stock buybacks. In March 2024, Parkland announced plans to sell 157 of its gas stations—mostly in Ontario and Quebec—to third-party operators, while maintaining fuel supply agreements with the new owners. In June 2024, Parkland announced the sale of its propane business to Avenir Energy. In August 2024, it was reported that Parkland had declined a takeover offer from Sunoco in 2023. In September 2024, Parkland announced its intent to sell its operations in Florida.

On May 5, 2025, Parkland announced that it had agreed to be acquired by Sunoco for US$9 billion. The combined company, SUNCorp LLC, would become the largest independent fuel distributor in the Americas, with a network of over 11,000 retail locations. The agreement is subject to approval under the Investment Canada Act, while Simpson Oil has signalled an opposition to the acquisition and has been attempting to engage in a proxy fight for control of the company's board.

On October 31, 2025, Sunoco LP completed its acquisition of the company.

== Operations ==
Parkland's three businesses are retail gas stations, commercial fuel distribution, and fuel supply and wholesaling.

Its retail gas station brands in Canada include (with number of sites owned or franchised, as of 2019):

- Ultramar (634 sites, primarily in Atlantic Canada, Quebec, and Ontario),
- Esso (634 sites)
- Fas Gas Plus (186 sites, primarily in Western Canada),
- Pioneer (170 sites, primarily in Ontario),
- Chevron (193 sites, primarily in British Columbia and Alberta)
- Race Trac (58 sites) — a franchised brand with independently run locations (unrelated to the U.S. chain RaceTrac)
- 29 other sites

As of the end of 2019, the company had 1863 stations in its network, of which it owns 641. Unlike gas retailing operations owned by integrated oil and gas companies, which generally buy from a single supplier, Parkland sources its fuel from multiple suppliers. In October 2019, Parkland partnered with CIBC to launch Journie, a loyalty program accepted at Chevron, FasGas, Pioneer, and Ultramar locations.

In addition to its retail arm, Parkland distributes fuel, including propane, diesel, and heating oil, to mainly commercial customers. It operates under various brands, including Bluewave Energy, Sparlings, and Ultramar.

In British Columbia, Parkland has historically been a franchise of the local restaurant chain White Spot, operating Triple-O's locations as part of its gas stations in the province. In 2016, Parkland acquired the On the Run brand and franchise network in Canada from Imperial Oil. The company has since begun to utilize On the Run in conjunction with its own retail petroleum brands to leverage its recognition, and introduced a refreshed version of the brand in 2018. Parkland began to expand the relaunched On the Run brand into the United States in 2020. In January 2022, Parkland announced plans to establish a new concept for standalone On the Run convenience stores in high-traffic urban locations, which will feature M&M products.
