= Pioneer Energy =

Canadian petrol station

Pioneer Energy LP
- Formerly: Pioneer Petroleums (1956–2011)
- Company type: Subsidiary
- Industry: Petroleum industry
- Founded: November 29, 1956; 69 years ago Hamilton, Ontario, Canada
- Founder: Murray Hogarth
- Headquarters: Burlington, Ontario, Canada
- Key people: Tim Hogarth (president & CEO)
- Products: Fuels, Lubricants, Petrochemicals
- Parent: Parkland Fuel (2016–present)
- Website: www.pioneer.ca/en/

Pioneer Energy LP (formerly Pioneer Petroleums) is a gas retailer and convenience store operator, with locations in Ontario, Canada. Founded by Murray Hogarth in 1956, it is headquartered in Burlington, Ontario. It is a subsidiary of Parkland Fuel Corporation.

== History ==
Murray Hogarth graduated from Queen's University and worked at Gulf Canada Limited learning the petroleum business. After three years Hogarth quit his job and founded his own private brand service station business in 1956. The first of the Pioneer Petroleums stations was opened on November 29, 1956 and is located at 859 Upper James St. in Hamilton, Ontario.

In 2011, Pioneer Petroleums changed their brand name to Pioneer Energy LP. It has modernized its operations with a number of different services. Snack Express is Pioneer's main convenience store brand and it offers standard convenience store items along with healthier snack options. As of 2012, Pioneer expanded its convenience store brands to include Verve, a new concept store that handles a more refined product offering. Many of its newer stations now offer Clean Express Car Washes with a variety of different washes. In 2013, Pioneer Fuels was established as an Esso branded commercial and home heating reseller in Nova Scotia and New Brunswick. It services approximately 21,000 households and has since been expanding across Atlantic Canada.

In 2014 Parkland Fuel agreed to buy Pioneer Energy for $378 million. 393 gas stations (148 with the Pioneer brand name) in Ontario and Manitoba were part of the initial deal. This merger was challenged by the Competition Bureau in 2015 with a modified acquisition being accepted in 2016.

== Loyalty ==
Its customer rewards/loyalty program began with collector stamps in the late 1950s. This was followed by the introduction of Pioneer Money in the 1960s. By the 1980s, the program evolved with the introduction of Pioneer paper Bonus Bucks. In the mid-2000s Pioneer began the Electronic Bonus Bucks card program. Bonus Bucks cardholders also benefit from exclusive discounts from Pioneer partner companies and organizations.

In October 2019, Parkland launched its new loyalty program Journie in partnership with CIBC, which is accepted at Pioneer, Chevron, FasGas, and Ultramar locations.

== Philanthropy ==
Pioneer has contributed to many Ontario based charities. Its “Give What You Can” campaign has donated over $1 million to Ontario's five designated children's hospitals and continues to do so. In part due to these efforts, the McMaster Children's Hospital was able to build the “Hogarth Family & Pioneer Energy Ophthalmology Centre”. As of 2012, Pioneer has also been involved in Operation Yellow Ribbon, which is an initiative across Canada to aid and support Canadian soldiers and their families. Pioneer became a donation partner of the CHML/Y108 Christmas Tree of Hope. The donations go to the CHML/Y108 Children's Fund, which helps support McMaster Children's Hospital, the Salvation Army, and Hamilton Children's Aid. Pioneer also partnered with the Ontario Federation of Anglers and Hunters to work on the Atlantic Salmon Restoration Project.
