= Ultramar plc =

- Industry: Oil and gas
- Founded: 1935
- Defunct: 1991
- Fate: Acquired
- Successor: LASMO
- Headquarters: London, UK
- Key people: John Darby (Chairman)

Ultramar plc was a leading British oil and gas exploration and production business. It was listed on the London Stock Exchange and was a constituent of the FTSE 100 Index.

== History ==
The Company was founded by four South African goldmining concerns in 1935 to explore for oil in Venezuela and initially traded as the Ultramar Exploration Co. Ltd. It changed its name to the Ultramar Co. Ltd in 1940.

It established an operation in Canada, now known as Ultramar Corporation, in 1961.

In 1988, it substantially expanded its operations in California acquiring a large refinery in Los Angeles from Union Pacific Corporation for $440m.

The Company was acquired by LASMO in 1991.
