= CST Brands =

American convenience store chain

CST Brands, Inc.
- Type: Corporation
- Industry: Convenience store
- Founded: May 1, 2013
- Defunct: June 28, 2017
- Fate: Acquired by Alimentation Couche-Tard and rebranded as Circle K
- Headquarters: San Antonio, Texas; United States
- Area served: North America

CST Brands, Inc. was an American publicly traded fuel and convenience retailer. It was the second-largest of its kind in North America, with 1,900 outlets in the U.S. and Canada. CST Brands had 2013 revenues of about $12.8 billion and made approximately $360 million in EBITDA. Stores were concentrated in the central and southwestern U.S. states and in eastern Canada. Corner Store was the firm's primary retail brand in the US and in Canada's English speaking provinces. In Canada's French speaking provinces, Dépanneur du Coin was the company's retail brand. In addition to convenience store retail sales, CST Brands also sold fuel under a number of licensed energy brands such as Valero, Exxon, Shell, and Phillips 66.

The company was created on May 1, 2013, when Valero Energy Corporation decided to spin off its retail operations in an effort to focus on refining. On August 6, 2014, CST Brands agreed to buy Lehigh Gas GP LLC, the general partner of Lehigh Gas Partners LP (LGP), from Lehigh Gas Corp in a cash and stock deal. CST Brands also acquired the associated Incentive Distribution Rights of LGP. The deal closed on October 1, 2014 and LGP changed its name to CrossAmerica Partners LP, trading under the ticker symbol "CAPL".

On August 22, 2016, Alimentation Couche-Tard, parent company of Circle K, entered a merger agreement with CST to acquire the company which had over 2,000 locations in an all cash deal worth $4.4 billion (~$5.62 billion in 2024), including net debt assumed. The transaction officially closed on June 28, 2017. Stores under the former CST brands including Corner Store, Flash Foods, and Nice N Easy Grocery Shoppes were converted and remodeled to the Circle K brand.

== Overview ==
CST operated over 1,000 Corner Store convenience store locations in the United States, including Texas, Louisiana, Arkansas, Oklahoma, New Mexico, Colorado, Wyoming, Arizona and California. On November 4, 2014 it was announced that CST Brands would acquire assets of Nice N Easy Grocery Shoppes, a New York-based company with over 30 company operated stores in its network. In November 2015, CST agreed to purchase Flash Foods from the Jones Company, a Waycross, Georgia-based convenience chain with 164 stores with retail fuel operations in Georgia and North Florida.

In Canada, CST sold Ultramar fuels through over 840 retail sites in Quebec, the Atlantic provinces and eastern Ontario. Additionally, the company is one of the largest retail distributors of home heating oil in Eastern Canada. The network includes 80 card lock sites located along natural trucking routes or industrial parks that allow trucking and commercial fleets to buy fuel 24 hours a day. Following the 2016 purchase of CST by Couche-Tard, most of its Ultramar operations were acquired by Parkland Corporation; 36 locations were retained by Couche-Tard, and converted to Irving stations with Circle K.

CST employed approximately 12,000 people throughout the Southwestern United States and Eastern Canada, including over 400 at the CST Headquarters in San Antonio, Texas and over 250 at the CST Regional Office in Montreal, Canada.

== Products ==
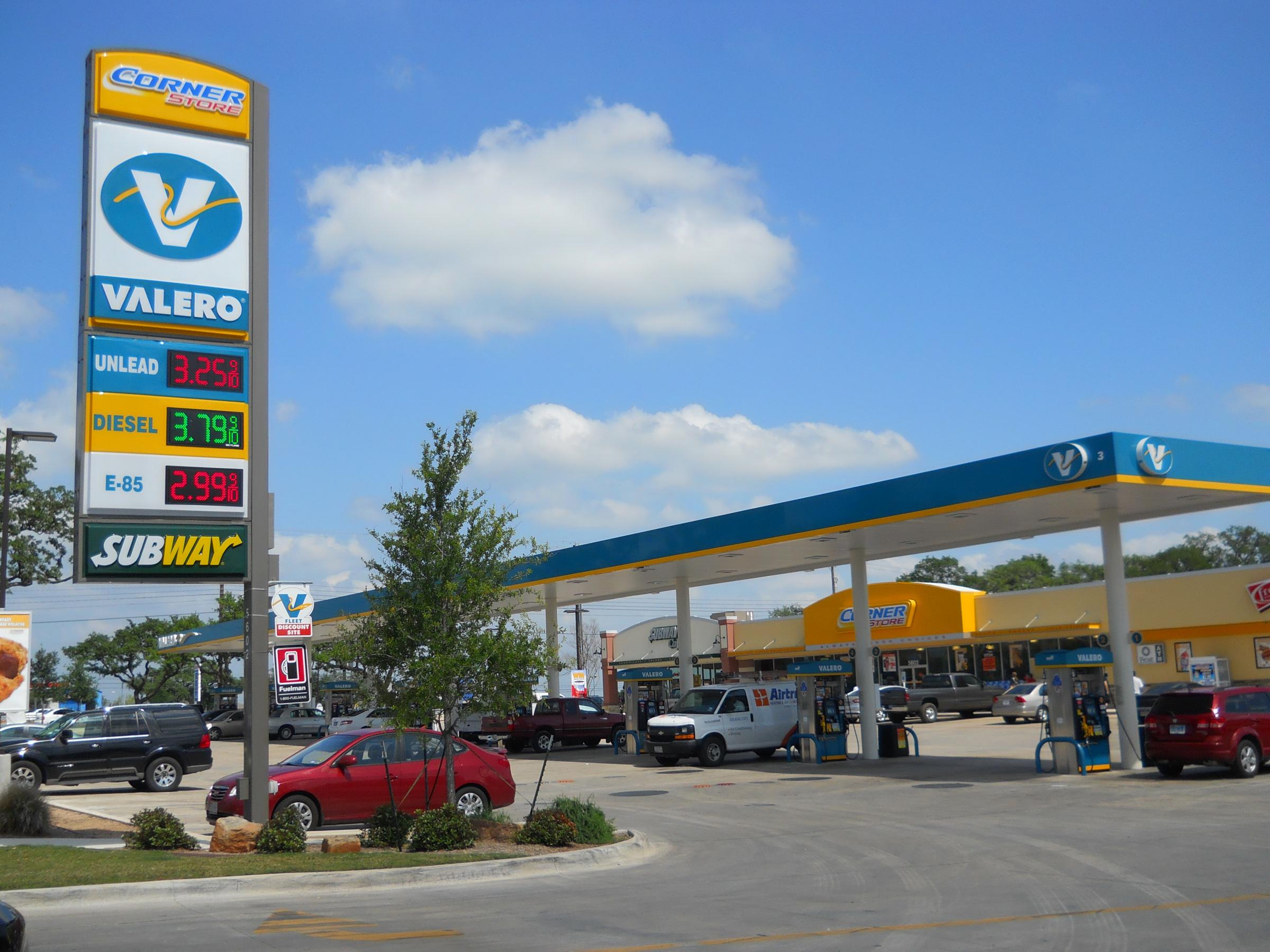
CST Brands Corner Store at UTSA Blvd. and IH10W in San Antonio

Corner Store offered a range of products, such as snack foods, tobacco products, beverages and fresh foods, including its own brands: Fresh Choices sandwiches, salads and packaged goods; U Force energy drinks; Cibolo Mountain coffees (the United States); Transit Cafe coffee and bakery (Canada); FC bottled sodas, and Flavors 2 Go fountain sodas. Some of its Corner Store locations also provided in-store Subway sandwich shops.

Inside the stores, CST added 14 new items to its line of signature, private-label products, while also growing sales in Corner Store's popular, fresh-baked goods, selling over 1.2 million whoopie pies and 4.6 million kolaches in 2013. Capitalizing on the popularity of its whoopie pies, the company outfitted a food truck to introduce more fans to the sweet treats at festivals and events in the markets CST serves.

== Competitors ==
CST operated in a highly competitive industry which included 7-Eleven, Casey's General Stores, The Pantry and future parent Couche-Tard, among the five largest chains. In 2014, CST had the third-largest chain with circa 1,900 sites.
