= M&M Food Market =

Canadian frozen food company

M&M Food Market Ltd.
- Formerly: M&M Meat Shops (1980–2016)
- Type: Subsidiary
- Industry: Frozen food retailer
- Founded: 1980; 46 years ago, in Kitchener, Ontario
- Founders: Michael Voisin; Mark Nowak
- Headquarters: Mississauga, Ontario
- Parent: Parkland Corporation (2022–present)
- Website: www.mmfoodmarket.com

M&M Food Market Ltd. (French: Les aliments M&M), formerly known as M&M Meat Shops, is a Canadian frozen food retail chain. The company is headquartered in Mississauga, Ontario, and has locations in all ten provinces, the Yukon and the Northwest Territories; the company formerly had operations in the Midwestern United States under the MyMenu brand that operated between 2008 and 2013.

== Origin ==
M&M was founded by Michael "Mac" Voisin and Mark Nowak in Kitchener, Ontario, in 1980. Voisin's and Nowak's original business model was to provide good quality meat at lower prices. The partners discovered that flash-frozen meats retained their freshness with Canadian-grown (Health Canada safe) meats with no steroids, added preservatives and no torture farms. However, because they could be stored over a longer term, their products be sold at a price comparable to supermarket meats.

M&M locations are generally small outlets in strip malls, consisting of several freezers and a counter acting as a point of sale. Store employees are known as "Meal Advisors," who are trained to assist customers by suggesting products and meal ideas.

In addition to the head office in Mississauga, M&M has regional offices in Montreal, Quebec and Calgary, Alberta.

== Growth ==
M&M opened its first new franchise in nearby Cambridge, Ontario, in 1982. Mac's brother and co-owner, Greg Voisin, became director of franchising in the mid-1980s. Since then, it has expanded to over 425 stores across Canada. M&M entered Quebec in 1992 and then in 1997, it entered the western provinces by acquiring the business of Jeffrey's Food, based in Edmonton, Alberta in 1993. M&M opened its first store in Yukon in 2004 (at Whitehorse) and in the Northwest Territories in 2006 (Yellowknife). Some of Mac's family members, including Guy Voisin, also work for the company.

Although it originally focused on cuts of meat, it has expanded its offerings to prepared meals, appetizers, pizza, pasta, seafood, desserts and single servings, including meatless items to appeal to vegetarians.

In the summer of 2019, M&M Food Market announced a partnership with Instacart allowing for customers to order their groceries online and have them delivered right to their door. In 2022, Parkland Corporation acquired M&M's for $322 million.

=== Loyalty program ===
In 2001, M&M launched the MAX Rewards loyalty program that would give members special pricing in-store and entries into exclusive contests. It is not a points-based program, but rather rewards customers with special in-store sale pricing not available to other customers. Over time, the program grew to include special reward vouchers periodically available for over 8 million MAX members and special email offers sent through the eMAX newsletter.

In early 2018, M&M announced a name change to their loyalty program, re-branding it as Real Rewards. M&M Food Market has since launched a mobile app that allows Real Reward members to see their exclusive product offerings.

=== Private takeover ===
In July 2014, the brand was assumed by private investment firm Searchlight Capital Partners, and partners. Searchlight appointed a chief executive officer, Andy O'Brien, and a chief financial officer, Sam Florio.

=== Name and format change ===
In March 2016, M&M Meat Shops announced that they would change their name to M&M Food Market. With the name change came a broadening of M&M's selection beyond frozen meats to include frozen produce, and other healthier selections. The company also indicated plans to expand M&M to 500 locations by 2019, along with revamped store layouts that remove the service counter that separates customers from the freezers. In February 2019, M&M began stocking their frozen meals in select locations of retailers such as Rexall, allowing them to reach every Province and Territory with retailers in Nunavut.

== Charity BBQ Day and Corporate Sponsorship ==
Charity BBQ Day was M&M Food Market's biggest charity event. It was held annually on the Saturday before Mother’s Day. Charity BBQ Day supported the CCFC, the Crohn's and Colitis Foundation of Canada, by raising funds for research through the sale of hamburgers and hot dogs for a minimum donation.

Charity BBQ Day first started in 1989, when the founder of M&M, Mac Voisin, wanted to give back to the community. He decided to support the CCFC, to help raise funds and support research into inflammatory bowel disease (IBD). IBD has "no known cause or cure," and "Canada has among the highest reported prevalence of IBD in the world." In 25 years, M&M Food Market has raised more than $24.3 million for medical research dedicated to finding a cure for IBD.

M&M Food Market holds other fundraising events through the year to support the CCFC. Such fundraisers include regional golf tournaments, the sale of Charity BBQ Day Penguins, Blossoms and Coupon Books, and by "sponsoring the Gutsy Walk and providing support in the form of BBQs in many event locations across the country."

M&M Food Market was also a long time sponsor of the Canadian Junior Curling Championships and was a "full sub-sponsor to the CCA's Season of Champions." During the Season of Champions, M&M held a contest where the grand prize was a trip to see the next year's World Juniors. Viewers would see a secret word displayed on the television which they then could enter on M&M's website.

== Awards and recognition ==
M&M Food Market have won numerous awards over the years, such as a Gold Frankie Award from the Canadian Franchise Association for excellence in advertising: Internet/Website Design in 2008. In 2013, M&M Food Market successfully re-qualified for the 7th consecutive year (Platinum) as one of Canada's 50 Best Managed Companies sponsored by Deloitte, CIBC Commercial Banking, National Post, and Queen’s School of Business. M&M Food Market has also twice held the world record for longest sausage: first in 1983 and again in May 1995 with a 46.3 km (28.8 mi) sausage produced in conjunction with Schneider Foods.

== MyMenu ==
In 2008, M&M ventured outside Canada for the first time, opening stores in the Midwestern United States under the banner MyMenu, so named to avoid any trademark conflict or confusion with the more prominent Mars-produced plurally-branded chocolate candy. Other than the new name (chosen to reflect a from-the-ground-up operation that "[helps] people put menus together"), MyMenu stores were similar in design and layout to the M&M locations in Canada, featuring freezers, a sales counter, and the blue-and-orange M&M colour scheme. The company started with 8 original MyMenu stores — 5 in the Madison, Wisconsin market and 3 in Fort Wayne, Indiana; these were considered "test market" locations, with the company hoping to convert them to franchise ownership before adding franchises in other Midwestern markets. A difficult economic climate that affected sales and franchise financing efforts prompted MyMenu to close 2 of its Madison stores in early 2010 and all of its remaining Madison and Fort Wayne stores in early 2011. Despite this setback, MyMenu continued operations and changed its focus to co-branding opportunities with established retailers in existing locations; the first co-branding effort was the October 2010 launch of stand-alone MyMenu departments at three locations of general-merchandise retailer The Andersons in Toledo, Maumee, and Columbus, Ohio. By March 2013, all United States efforts, including co-branding, were discontinued, with the MyMenu.com website indicating that the company was no longer operating in the U.S.
