= Lasmo =

Lasmo plc
- Trade name: Lasmo
- Industry: Oil and gas
- Founded: 1971; 55 years ago
- Defunct: 2001
- Fate: Acquired
- Successor: Eni
- Headquarters: London, UK
- Key people: Rudolph Agnew (Chairman); Joe Darby (Chief executive officer)

Lasmo plc was a British oil and gas exploration and production business. It was listed on the London Stock Exchange and was a constituent of the FTSE 100 Index.

== History ==
The Company was founded in 1971 as London and Scottish Marine Oil (LASMO) to explore the North Sea. It struck oil in the Ninian Field in 1974 and was first listed on the London Stock Exchange in 1977. In the early 1990s it expanded its operations into Indonesia, Algeria and Pakistan. It bought Ultramar plc in 1991 in a hostile takeover battle.

It successfully fought off a hostile bid from Enterprise Oil in 1994. It expanded into Venezuela in 1997 paying $453m for an interest in the Dacion Field. In 1999 it acquired Monument Oil & Gas for £460m.

In 2001 it was acquired by Eni, who successfully outbid an initial offer from Amerada Hess.
