= Ultramar =

Canadian gas station chain

- Type: Subsidiary
- Industry: Oil refining and marketing
- Founded: 1961
- Headquarters: Montreal, Quebec, Canada
- Area served: Eastern Canada
- Parent: Ultramar plc (1961–1991); Lasmo (1991–1992); Valero Energy (2001–2013); CST Brands (2013–2016); Parkland Fuel (2016–present)
- Website: www.ultramar.ca

Ultramar is a Canadian gas and home fuel retailer, with its head office located in Montreal, Quebec. Ultramar operates gas stations and home fuel delivery in Ontario, Quebec, and Atlantic Canada.

== History ==
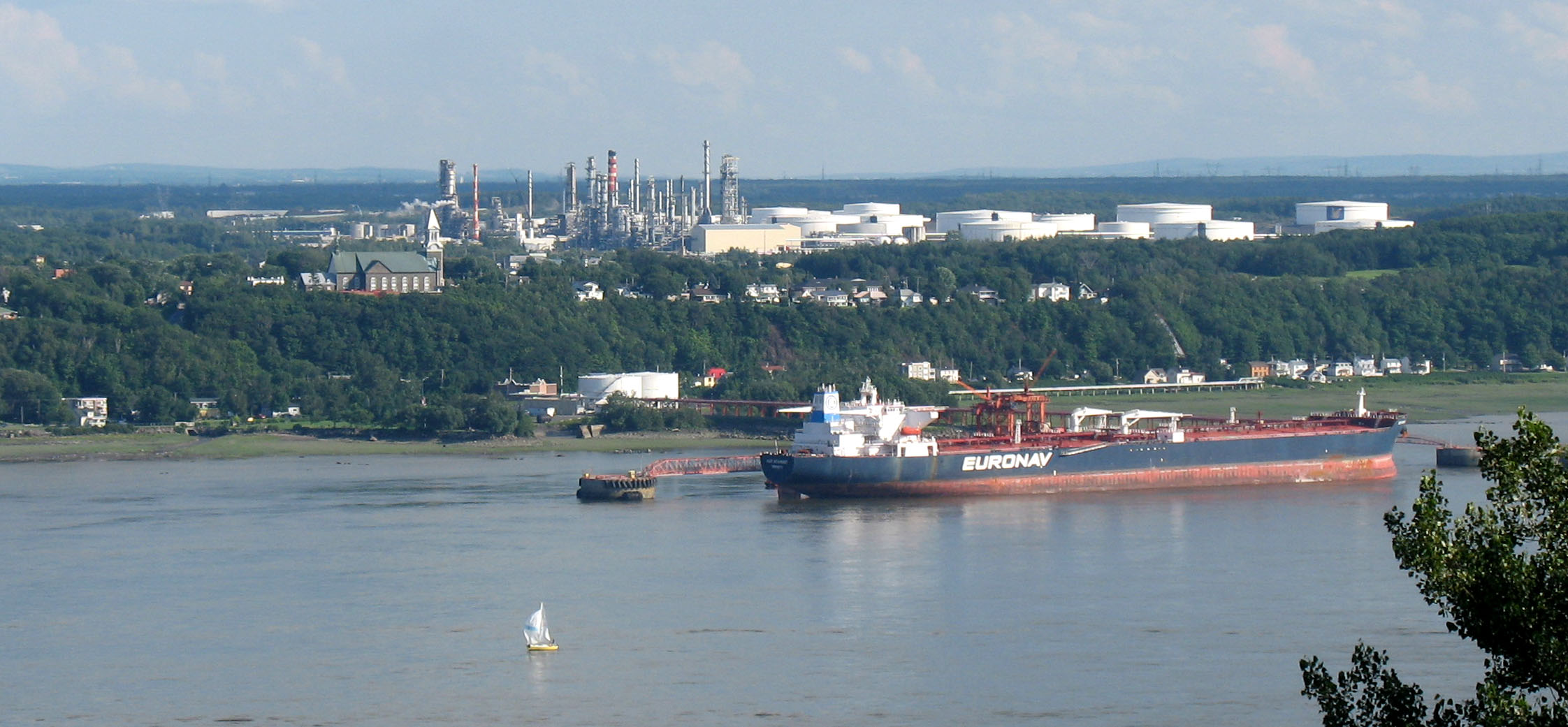
Jean-Gaulin Refinery in Lévis, Quebec

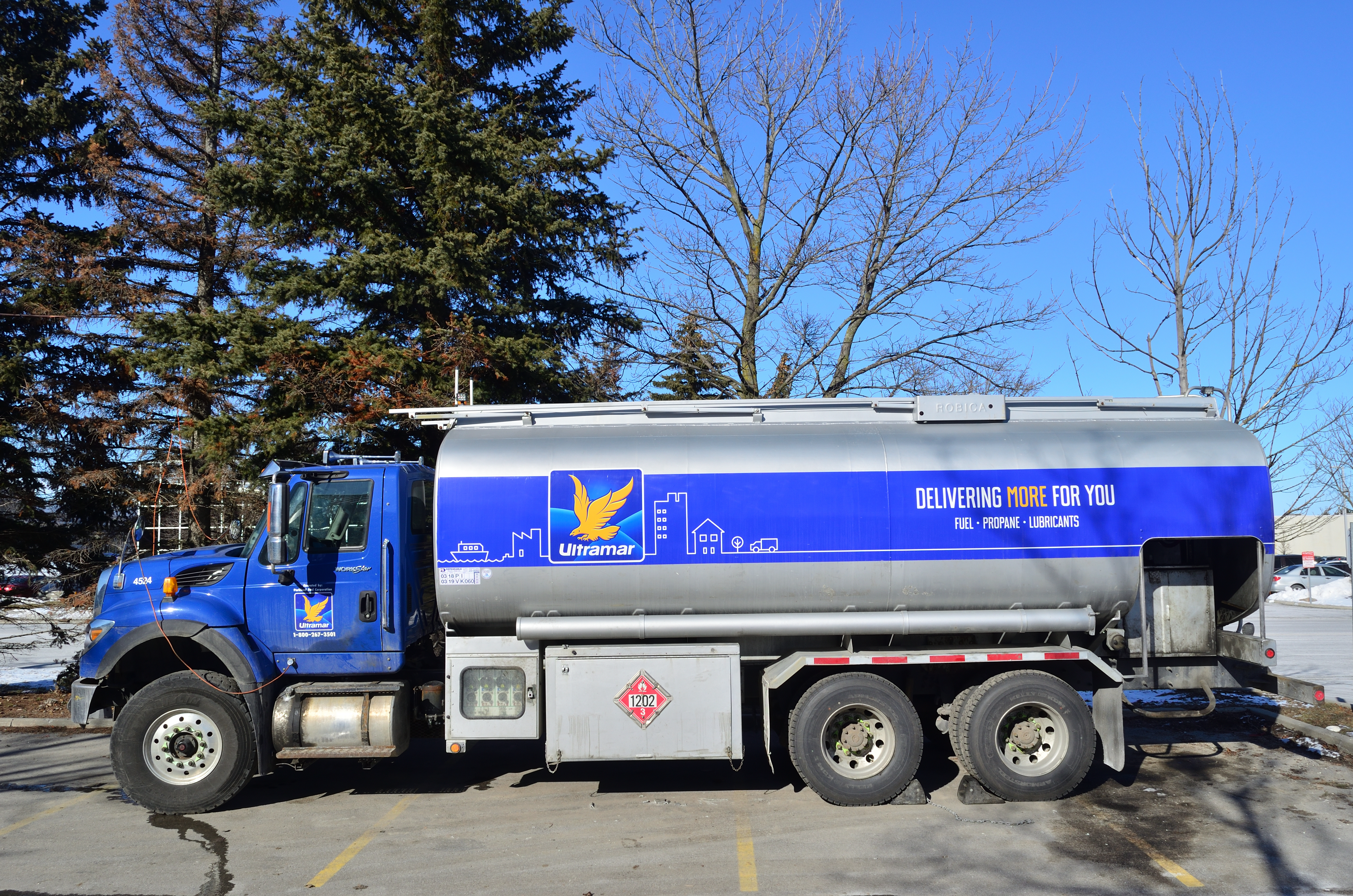
Ultramar fuel truck in the Toronto area.

British oil company Ultramar plc established operations in Canada in 1961. Retail stations were originally branded "Golden Eagle". Its refinery in Lévis, Quebec was built ten years later.

From 1979 to 1996, Ultramar grew by acquiring stations from several other companies, including Canadian fuel marketers Texaco Canada, Gulf Canada, Sergaz, Sunoco and Spur.

In 1981, Ultramar acquired Hanford, California-based Beacon Oil Company. It retained the name.

In 1990, it acquired the Dartmouth, Nova Scotia refinery with the purchase of other assets of Texaco Canada.

In 1991, Lasmo, a British oil company, bought Ultramar plc and in 1992 Lasmo spun off the North American refining and marketing operations which became known as Ultramar Corporation.

In 1994, Ultramar acquired Sergaz (founded in 1971 by André Ducharme) and Sunoco's Quebec gas stations. Some gas stations still operate under Sergaz but most were closed.

In 1996, Ultramar Corporation merged with Diamond Shamrock to form Ultramar Diamond Shamrock.

In 1997, the Sunoco name was withdrawn from Quebec, and all stations converted to the Ultramar brand or closed.

The refinery in Lévis was renamed in honour of retired Ultramar Diamond Shamrock CEO Jean Gaulin in 2001.

On December 31, 2001, Valero Energy Corporation completed its acquisition of Ultramar Diamond Shamrock.

On May 1, 2013, Ultramar was spun off from Valero into CST Brands. Following the 2016 purchase of CST by Alimentation Couche-Tard, Parkland Fuel acquired most of CST's Canadian assets, including Canadian rights to the Ultramar brand.

Couche-Tard retained 36 Ultramar stations in Atlantic Canada. In June 2018, Couche-Tard and its partner Irving Oil announced that these stations would become Circle K locations with Irving as fuel supplier, and that 13 of them would be sold to Irving outright—with Couche-Tard operating them under a lease as with most other Irving locations.

In October 2019, Ultramar became part of Parkland's new national loyalty program Journie.

== Operations ==
Ultramar was also active in industrial sales and wholesale supply.

== Statistics ==
Ultramar had 983 service stations, 87 truck stop facilities and 169,000 home heating oil customers.

It directly employed 3,600 people and indirectly employed 10,000. The refinery in Lévis produced 265,000 barrels (or 41.5 million litres) per day.
