= List of automotive fuel retailers =

This is a list of notable automotive fuel retailers ("petrol" or "gasoline", "diesel", etc.) and their controlling oil companies. The format of this page is based on current ownership and where they largely operate:

- Parent company
  - Children (acquired companies and notable brands)

== A ==
- Access Fuels — Australia
- Admiral Oil Co. — Michigan
- Akwa Group — Morocco
  - Afriquia
- Aldrees — Saudi Arabia
- Alliance — Russia
- Allied Petroleum — Pakistan
- Allied Petroleum - New Zealand
- Aloha Petroleum — Hawaii
- Alon — United States
- Amerika — South Florida, U.S.
- Amic Energy — Poland and Ukraine
- Amoco — United States
- Ampol — Australia
- Ampride — United States
- ANCAP — Uruguay
- APCO — Australia
- Anonima Petroli Italiana — Italy
- APCO — Midwest, U.S.
- Applegreen - Republic of Ireland, UK and the U.S.
- Argos — Netherlands
- Asda — United Kingdom
- Askar Oil — Pakistan
- Astron Energy - South Africa
- Atlantsolía — Iceland
- Attock Petroleum — Pakistan and Afghanistan
- Auchan — France, Hungary, Poland and Portugal
  - Alcampo — Spain
- Avia International — Pan-European
- Axion Energy — Argentina
- Azpetrol — Azerbaijan
- Al-Osais Petroleum — Saudi Arabia
- ARCO Southwest - New York

== B ==
- Bapco — Bahrain
  - Mumtaz
- Bates Oil — Ireland
- Bangladesh Petroleum Exploration and Production Company Limited — Bangladesh
  - Padma Oil Company — Bangladesh
  - Jamuna Oil Company — Bangladesh
  - Meghna Petroleum Limited — Bangladesh
- Bemol — Moldova
- Best — Norway
- Bharat Petroleum — India
- BP (advertising tagline "Beyond Petroleum"; initials stood for British Petroleum, but with the merger of Amoco in 1998, BP is the actual corporate name)
  - Amoco — United States, was used as a fuel grade until BP brought it back as a fuel brand in 2017
  - Aral — Germany, Luxembourg
  - Burmah — former gasoline brand used in the UK, Australia and Belgium
  - Sohio — former gasoline brand, now used as a marine fuel brand in Ohio
- bft — Germany
- Buc-ee's — United States
- Budget Petrol — Australia
- Burk - Australia
- BWOC — UK
- By-Macken — Sweden

== C ==
- Canadian Tire Petroleum — Canada
- Cango Incorporated — small Canadian petroleum group, partners with Esso Imperial Oil
- Carrefour — France, Belgium, Spain, Italy, Poland and Romania
- Casino — France
- Cepsa — Spain, Andorra, Morocco and Portugal
- Certified — independent brand based in Columbus, Ohio, United States, selling fuel under the Certified brand; also sells fuel at select stations under the Marathon and Sunoco brands
  - Cango
  - Gas Rite
  - Sunys
- Challenge — New Zealand
- Chevron — international
  - Chevron — United States, Canada, and Mexico
  - Caltex — Asia, Africa, New Zealand
  - Texaco — Europe, United States and Latin America
- China National Petroleum Corporation — China
  - PetroChina — China
- CHS
  - Cenex — United States, mainly midwestern, western and southwest regions
- Classic Tankstellen — Germany
- Circle K
  - Ingo — Denmark and Sweden
- Citgo
- Clark; United States: now a licensed brand only
- Coastal — Panama; also owns Delta; Coastal name being phased out in most US States
- Combustia — Switzerland
- Conad — Italy
- Conoco
  - 76 — former brand of Union Oil of California, which has exited the retail fuel business
  - Conoco — southeast and central United States
  - Jet — Germany, Ireland and the United Kingdom
  - Phillips 66
    - Supplied by Suncor Energy in Colorado
  - ProJet — Malaysia, sold late 2007 to Shell
- Coop — Italy
- Coop — Switzerland
- Copec — Chile
- Cosan — Brazil; acquired Esso's Brazilian distribution business and is slowly phasing in its own brand
- Cosmo Oil — Japan
- Costco Gasoline — next to many Costco stores
- CountryMark — Indiana
- CPC Corporation — Taiwan
- Crevier — Canada
- Crystal Flash Petroleum — United States (Indiana)
- Cupet — Cuba
- Casey's — Texas

== D ==
- DATS 24 — Belgium
- Delek — Israel
- Delta — Panama
- Deutsche Erdöl-Aktiengesellschaft (DEA) — Germany and neighboring countries; sold by RWE to Shell in 2001
- Din-X — Sweden
- Domo Gasoline — Western Canada
- Dor-Alon — Israel

== E ==
- E.Leclerc — France and Poland
- Eastern Petrolum — Philippines
- EG3 — Argentina; Isaura, Astra and Puma merged in 1996 to create the brand
- EG Group - UK, France, Belgium, Netherlands, Luxembourg, Germany, Italy, Australia and the United States
  - EG Australia — Australia; petrol supplied by Caltex Lubricants and fluids by Havoline
- Elton Oil — Senegal
- Emo — Ireland
- Emsi - Lithuania
- Eneos (Nippon Oil Corporation) — Japan and China
- Engen — South Africa
- Eni — Italy, Austria, Cyprus, France, Germany, Switzerland and Spain
  - Agip
- Eroski — Northern Spain
- EsclatOil — Catalonia, Spain
- EuroOil — Czech Republic
- ExxonMobil
  - Esso — Worldwide, mainly Europe and Asia
  - Esso/Imperial Oil — Canada
  - Exxon — United States
  - Mobil — United States, Canada, Colombia, Australia, Egypt, Mexico, Nigeria and New Zealand, formerly in Hong Kong, Japan and Malaysia

== F ==
- Fabian Oil - New England
- Family Express - Indiana
- Fast Lube — Pakistan
- Federated Co-operatives — western Canada
- fieten olie - netherlands
- Firezone — Netherlands
- Freedom Fuel - United States
- Freedom Fuels — Australia
- Flying J — United States and Canada (now owned by Pilot)
- Flying V — Philippines
- Formosa Petrochemical — Republic of China (Taiwan)
  - Beeline
- Frontier — United States

== G ==
- Galp — Portugal
- Gas America — United States; Indiana and Ohio
- Gasoline Alley Services (G.A.S) — New Zealand
- Gas Land Petroleum, Inc. Northeast US
- Getty Petroleum Marketing Inc.
  - Getty — eastern US
- Giant Eagle
  - GetGo
- Giant Industries, Inc — southwestern United States
  - Conoco (joint alliance to market the Conoco gasoline brand) — Arizona, New Mexico, Colorado and Utah
  - Giant — Arizona, Colorado and New Mexico
  - Mustang — Arizona, New Mexico, Colorado and Utah
- Glusco — Ukraine
- GPM Investments - United States
- GS Caltex — South Korea and China
- Gulf Oil — Northeastern US (by Cumberland Farms); Puerto Rico; Mexico, UK, Netherlands, Belgium, Sweden, Finland, Albania, North Macedonia, Turkey, Jordan
- Gull Industries — Pacific Northwest US
  - Gull — Washington, Oregon
- Gull Petroleum — Western Australia
  - Gull Petroleum — Western Australia, New Zealand (North Island)
  - Peak Petroleum — Western Australia

== H ==
- Haahr Benzin — Denmark
- Hancock — eastern United States
- Hascol Petroleum — Pakistan
- Hele — Hawaii
- Hellenic Petroleum — Greece
  - bp — Greece
  - EKO — Greece, Bulgaria, Cyprus, Montenegro, Serbia
  - OKTA — North Macedonia
- Hess Corporation
  - Hess — United States
    - Merit - Northeastern United States (defunct)
- Hi Tec Oil — Australia, New Zealand
- Hifa Petrol — Bosnia and Herzegovina
  - Hifa Oil — Montenegro
- Hindustan Petroleum — India
- Holiday Stationstores — midwestern and northwestern United States
- Hoyer — Germany
- Huck's Food & Fuel — Midwestern US
- Husky Energy — Canada
  - Husky
  - Mohawk
- Hyundai Oilbank — South Korea

== I ==
- Idemitsu — Japan
- Indian Oil Corporation — India, Sri Lanka, Mauritius, Middle East and other countries
- INSA Oil — Bulgaria
- Intermarché — France, Poland and Portugal
- IP — Italy
- Ipiranga — Brazil
- IQ — Austria
- Irving Oil — Eastern Canada and New England
- Isaura — Argentina

== J ==
- JOMO — Japan
- Jurki — Slovakia

== K ==
- Kocolene Marketing — United States: Indiana, Ohio and Kentucky
  - Fast Max convenience stores
- Kroger — sells under various brands throughout the United States in connection with their grocery and convenience stores such as Kroger, King Soopers, Turkey Hill and Loaf 'n Jug
- Kuwait Petroleum Corporation
  - KNPC — Kuwait
  - Kuwait Petroleum International
    - Q8 — Italy, Belgium, Netherlands, Luxembourg, Denmark and Spain
    - OKQ8 — Sweden, joint venture with OK
    - IQ8 — Vietnam
    - Tango - Netherlands and Luxembourg
- Kwik Trip — United States, Wisconsin, Minnesota, Iowa
- Kygnus Oil — Japan
- Kum & Go — Michigan

== L ==
- Lanka — Sri Lanka
- La Gas - Mexico
- Liberty — United States
- Liberty Oil — Australia
- Liqui Moly — Germany
- Lotos — Poland
- Lukoil
  - AKPET — Turkey
  - Teboil — Finland

== M ==
- Makpetrol - North Macedonia
- Marathon Petroleum
  - Marathon
  - Rich Oil
    - Starvin' Marvin's — defunct
  - ARCO

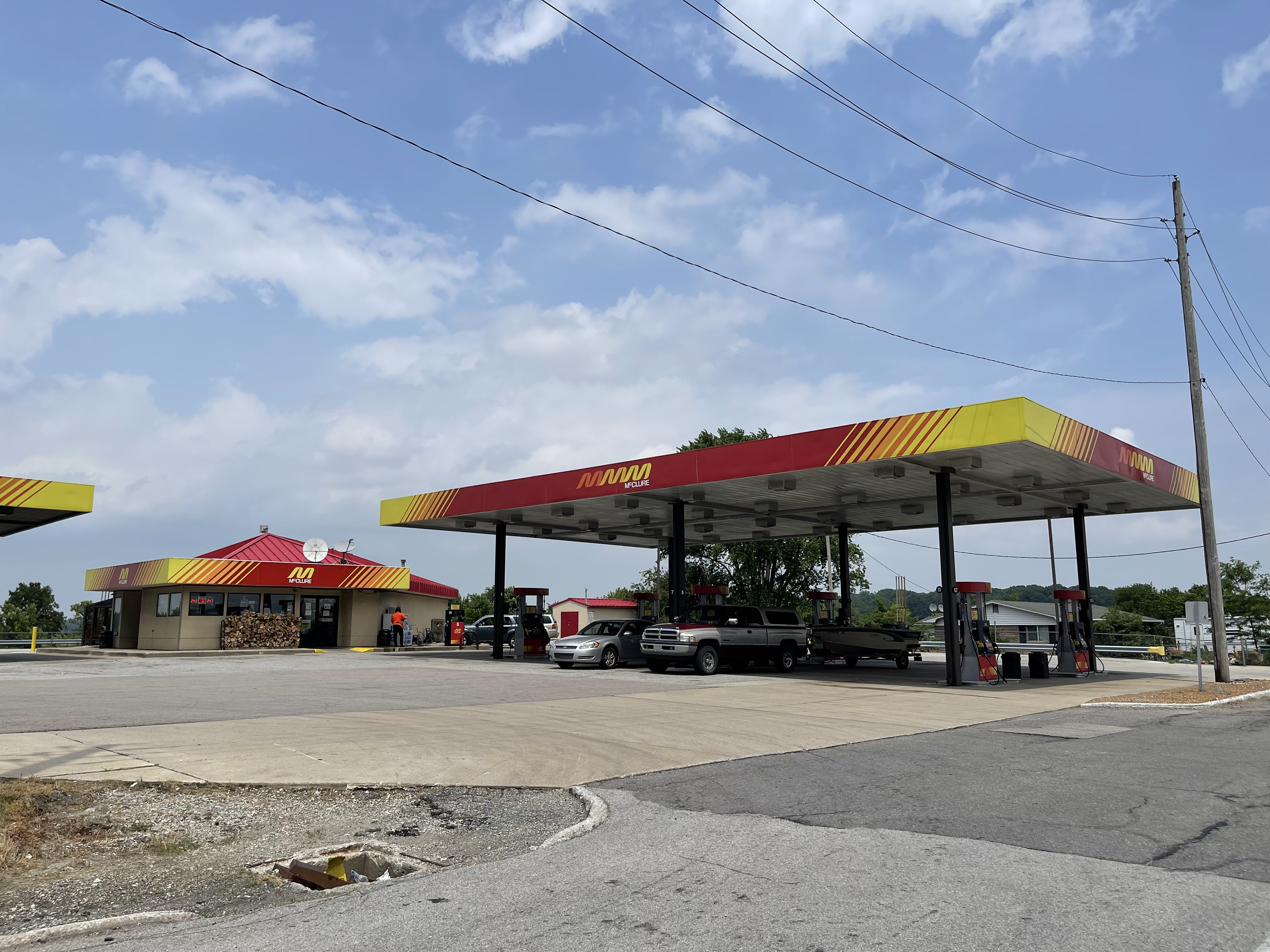
A McClure Oil gas station in Bennetts Switch, Indiana in 2022.

- Martin and Bayley
- Mariposa Oil- Texas
- Maverik Inc — Western US
- Maxol — Ireland
  - Estuary
- McClure Oil Corporation — United States: Indiana
- Meijer — Michigan, Ohio, Indiana, Illinois, Kentucky
- Metro Petroleum — Australia
- Migrol — Switzerland
- Minera — Southwest Germany
- Mitsubishi Energy Business Group — Japan
- MOL — Hungary, Czech Republic, Poland, Romania, Serbia, Slovenia
  - INA — Croatia, Bosnia and Herzegovina, Montenegro
  - Slovnaft — Slovakia
- Morrisons — United Kingdom
- Motor Oil Hellas — Greece
  - Avin
  - Cyclon
  - Shell
- Motul — France
- Murphy Oil
  - Murco — United Kingdom
  - MurphyUSA — United States, primarily at Wal-Mart locations
  - Spur - United States
  - Minnoco — Minnesota

== N ==
- N1 — Iceland
- Naftal — Algeria
- National Petroleum — Republic of China (Taiwan)
- National Petroleum - Trinidad and Tobago, West Indies
- Neste — Finland
- Nippon Oil — Japan
- NIS — Serbia
- Nordoel (Lother Gruppe) — Northern Germany
- North Atlantic Refining — Newfoundland, Canada
- NAFT — Saudi Arabia
- NPD - New Zealand

== O ==
- Octa+ — Belgium
- OIL! — Germany, Austria, Switzerland, Denmark
- Oil and Gas Development Corporation (OGDC) — Pakistan
- OiLibya — UAE, Africa
- OK
  - OKQ8 — Sweden, joint venture with Q8
- OK Benzin — Denmark
- OKKO — Ukraine
- Olco — Ontario and Quebec, Canada
- Olerex — Estonia
- Olís — Iceland
- OMV — Austria, Germany, Bulgaria, Czech Republic, Hungary, Romania, Serbia, Slovakia
  - Avanti — Austria, discount brand
  - Petrom — Romania, Moldova
- Opet — Turkey
- Orkan Bensín — Iceland
- Oro Negro — Texas

== P ==
- Pacific Pride — United States
- Pakistan Burma Shell (PBS) — Pakistan
- Pakistan Oilfields — Pakistan
- Pakistan Refinery — Pakistan
- Pakistan Standard Oil — Pakistan
- Pakistan State Oil — Pakistan
- Parallel — Ukraine
- Parkland Corporation — Canada
  - Chevron - under license
  - Fas Gas Plus
  - Pioneer Petroleum
  - Ultramar
- Paz — Israel
- Pemex — Mexico
- Pertamina — Indonesia
- Petcom [now a subsidiary of Phoenix Fuels] — Jamaica
- Petro-Canada — Canada
- Petrobras — Brazil
- PetroChina — People's Republic of China
- Petrofina — Belgian company merged with Total in 1999
  - Fina — United States
- Petrol Ofisi — Turkey
- Petrol AD — Bulgaria
- Petrol Group — Slovenia, Croatia, Bosnia and Herzegovina, Montenegro, Serbia
- Petróleos de Nicaragua — Nicaragua
  - Petronic
- Petroleos de Venezuela
  - Citgo — United States
  - PDV — Venezuela
- Petróleos Mexicanos — Mexico
  - Pemex
- Petrolina — Cyprus
- PetrolPlaza — Malta
- Petrom (subsidiary of Holsatek Group) — Morocco
- Petron — Philippines
- Petronas — Malaysia
  - Engen — South Africa
- Petronic — Nicaragua
- Petroperú — Peru
- Phillips 66
- Phoenix — Philippines
- Pilot Corporation — United States
  - Flying J — United States and Canada
  - Pilot Flying J — United States
- Pioneer Energy - Canada
- PKN Orlen — Poland
  - Benzina — Czech Republic
  - Orlen — Poland, Czech Republic, Slovakia, Hungary, Lithuania, Germany
  - Orlen Lietuva — Lithuania
  - Star — Germany
  - Turmöl — Austria
  - UniPetrol
- Polly — United States
- Preem — Sweden
- Pride Stores - United States - Massachusetts and Connecticut
- Primax — Peru
- Prista Oil — Bulgaria
- Prio Energy — Portugal
- PTT Station — Thailand, Laos, Cambodia
- Puma Energy — Singapore, Puerto Rico, Guatemala, Switzerland, South Africa, Argentina
- Petromin — Jeddah, Saudi Arabia

== Q ==
- Q1 — Germany
- Q8 — Italy, Belgium, Netherlands, Luxembourg, Denmark and Spain
- Qstar — Sweden
  - Bilisten — Sweden
- QuickChek — New Jersey, New York
- QuikStop — Western United States
- QuikTrip — Midwestern and Southern United States, Arizona

== R ==
- RaceTrac Petroleum — southeastern United States
  - RaceTrac — company-owned stores
  - RaceWay — franchised stores
- Red Barn (Gas Barn) — United States, Indiana, was part of Tire Barn, sold to Gas America
- Refinor — Argentina (only available in the provinces of Jujuy, Salta, Tucumán, Santiago del Estero and Córdoba)
- Reitangruppen
  - Uno-X — Denmark and Norway
  - YX Energi — Denmark and Norway, formerly known as Hydro Texaco
- Reliance Industries — India
- Repsol — Spain, Portugal and Andorra
- Rickers — United States — Indiana
- Rocket X Fuel — midwest United States (now defunct), notable for red Xs on fencing surrounding the station
- Rompetrol — Romania, Moldova, Bulgaria and Georgia
- Royal Farms — Maryland, Delaware, Pennsylvania, Virginia, West Virginia, New Jersey, and North Carolina
- Rubis — Barbados, St. Kitts and Nevis, St. Lucia, St. Vincent and Grenadies
- Runes Bensin — Sweden
- Rutter's — Pennsylvania, Maryland, West Virginia, and Virginia

== S ==
- S Group
  - ABC — Finland
- Sainsbury's — United Kingdom
- Sasol — South Africa
- Saudi Aramco — Saudi Arabia
  - S-Oil — South Korea
- Seaoil — Philippines
- SEO — Finland
- 7-Eleven
  - Speedway
- Sheetz — Pennsylvania, Maryland, Ohio, Michigan, West Virginia, Virginia, North Carolina
- Shell
  - Motiva Enterprises — a joint venture with Saudi Aramco, sold under Shell brand
  - Shell — international
    - Shell V-Power — enhanced high specification fuel
  - Shell Canada
- Shell — United States, BeNeLux
- Shell Australia — Australia
- Sinclair — Western and Central U.S.
- Singapore Petroleum Company (SPC) — Singapore
- Sinopec — China
- SK Energy — South Korea
- SK Gas — South Korea
- SOCAR
  - A1 - Austria
  - SOCAR - Azerbaijan, Georgia, Romania, Switzerland, Ukraine
- SOL PETROLEUM — Barbados
  - Simpson Oil
- Solo Oil
- Sonol — Israel
- Speedway — United States
- Speedy Q — Michigan
- Spirit Petroleum — Pennsylvania
- Sprint — Germany
- St1 — Finland, Norway, Poland and Sweden
- Stork — Japan
- Sunoco — United States and one location in Canada
- SuperAmerica — Minnesota, Wisconsin, South Dakota
- SuperTest — Indiana
- Swifty — United States, primarily Indiana
- SASCO — Saudi Arabia
- Sunoco — Maine

== T ==
- Tamoil — Italy, Germany, Netherlands, Spain and Switzerland
  - HEM — Germany
- Tanka — Sweden, owned by Renault and Volvo dealers
- Terpel — Colombia
  - Accel — Panama
- Tesco — United Kingdom, Ireland, Czech Republic, Slovakia and Hungary
  - Tesco Momentum 99
- Tesoro — United States (acquired by Marathon Petroleum Company)
  - ARCO
    - Thrifty — California; formerly purchased by ARCO before BP takeover
    - United Oil — California
  - Shell (under license)
  - Tesoro
  - USA Gasoline
- Thorntons — Kentucky, Indiana, Illinois, Ohio, Tennessee, and Florida
- Tidewater Oil — under the name Tydol and Flying A, bought by Getty
- Tifon — Croatia
- Tirex — Moldova
- TinQ — Netherlands
- TOP — Ireland
- Topaz Energy — Ireland
  - Shell (under license)
  - Statoil (under license)
- Total — France, plus select countries in Europe, Latin America, Africa and Asia
  - APCO — United States
  - Elf
  - Vickers — United States
- Tas'helat — Saudi Arabia
- Tom Thumb
- TPPD — Turkey
- Texaco — Florida

== U ==
- Ukrnafta — Ukraine
- UniOil — Philippines
- United Petroleum — Australia
- United Refining
  - Kwik Fill – New York, Pennsylvania, and Ohio
- UTOCO - Utah

== V ==
- Valero — U.S.
  - Beacon — U.S.
  - Diamond Shamrock — U.S.
  - Shamrock — U.S.
  - Total — U.S.
  - UK Fuels Brand — filling stations still in existence, though company now focuses on fuel cards
- Vento — Moldova
- Vibe Petroleum — Australia
- Vooma — South Africa

== W ==
- Wawa — Alabama, Delaware, Florida, Georgia, Indiana, Kentucky, Maryland, New Jersey, North Carolina, Ohio, Pennsylvania, Virginia, Washington, D.C., and West Virginia
- Wilsons Gas Stops — Atlantic Canada
- WOG — Ukraine
- WSCO Petroleum — Pacific Northwest US
  - Astro — Washington, Oregon
  - WDTV — Colorado
  - WDTVS Fuel Xpress (sister of WDTv)
- Wafi Energy — Saudi Arabia

== Y ==
- YPF — Argentina, Uruguay and Chile

== Z ==
- Z Energy — New Zealand
- Zenex — South Africa
- Zephyr — United States (Midwest)
- Ziz — Morocco
