= Crevier =

Crevier is a French surname derived from the Old French word creve (crevice, fissure), indicating someone who lived on or near arid land. Notable people with the surname include:

- Axelle Crevier (born 1997), Canadian water polo player
- Bruce Crevier (born 1964), American basketball performer
- Daniel Crevier (born 1947), Canadian entrepreneur and artificial intelligence and image processing researcher
- Jean Crevier de Saint-François (1642–1693), early French settler in New France
- Jean-Baptiste Louis Crévier (1693–1765), French author
- Joseph-Alexandre Crevier (1824–1889), Canadian physician and naturalist
- Louis Crevier (born 2001), Canadian ice hockey player
- Ron Crevier (born 1958), Canadian basketball player who played in the National Basketball Association

== See also ==
- Crevier v. Quebec, a 1981 Supreme Court of Canada case
- Crevier BMW, a car dealership in Santa Ana, California
- Fort Crevier, a French fort in Quebec, designated a National Historic Site of Canada
- Crevier, a Canadian fuel brand - see List of automotive fuel brands
