= Lukoil Baltija =

- Trade name: LUKOIL
- Industry: Petrol stations
- Founded: November 12, 1992
- Headquarters: Užubaliai, Lithuania
- Area served: Latvia, Lithuania, Estonia, Finland
- Revenue: €724 mil. (2012)
- Parent: Amic Energy
- Website: amicenergy.com

Lukoil Baltija was a chain of petrol stations in the Baltic states. Currently it is owned by Austrian-based Amic Energy.

In 2012, Lukoil Baltija was listed as the 4th largest company in Lithuania by annual revenue.

In 2015, Lukoil signed a deal to sell its 37 stations in Estonia to Aqua Marina, a subsidiary of Olerex. In late 2015 and early 2016, Lukoil announced that its 230 stations are being sold in Latvia, Lithuania and Poland to Austria-based AMIC Energy Management.

At the beginning of 2016, the Austrian company Amic Energy Management GmbH purchased the networks of gas stations in Lithuania, Latvia and Poland from the Russian company Lukoil. 100% of its shares belong to Amic Energy Holding. The latter is owned by five individuals.

In 2017, Lukoil Baltija stations were leased to „Viada LT, UAB“.
