= Volgograd refinery =

Oil refinery in Volgograd, Russia

Volgograd Refinery
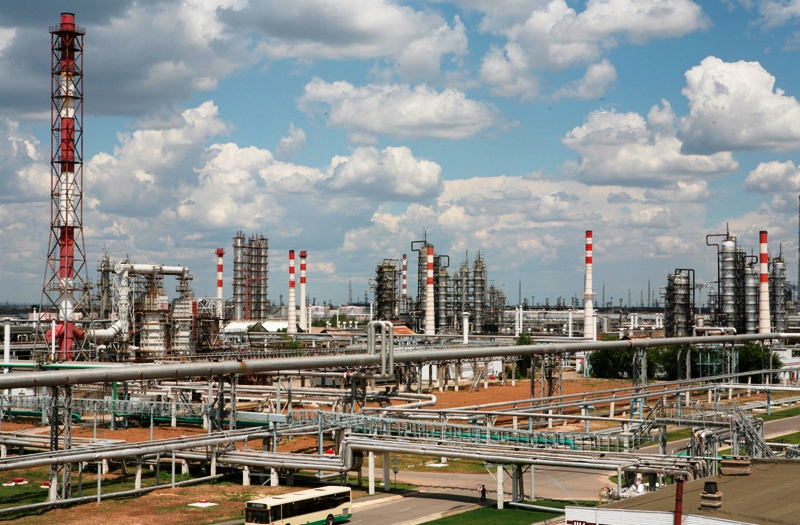

- Location within Volgograd Oblast Location within European Russia
- Interactive map of Volgograd Refinery
- Location: Volgograd, Russia; 48°29′21″N 44°37′38″E

Refinery details
- Operator: Lukoil
- Opened: 1957
- No. of employees: ~2,200
- Website: vnpz.lukoil.ru

The Volgograd Refinery (Russian: Лукойл-Волгограднефтепереработка) is an oil refinery plant in the Russian city of Volgograd, one of the largest in the country.

== History ==
In February 1952, construction of a new oil refinery plant near Volgograd began, which was completed by December 1957 and began operations soon after. In the following years, the refinery significantly expanded its production capacity and range.

In 2005, the production of petroleum coke through calcination began at the refinery, with production at about 100,000 tons per year.

In 2006, the refinery began to produce gasoline that fit the European emission standard of Euro-3. The refinery also began production of diesel fuel.

In June 2015, the introduction of a new refining unit to facilitate the production of LNG, which increased the refinery's processing capacity to 14.5 million tons per year.

In May 2016, the refinery began producing fuel that fulfill the Euro-5 standard.

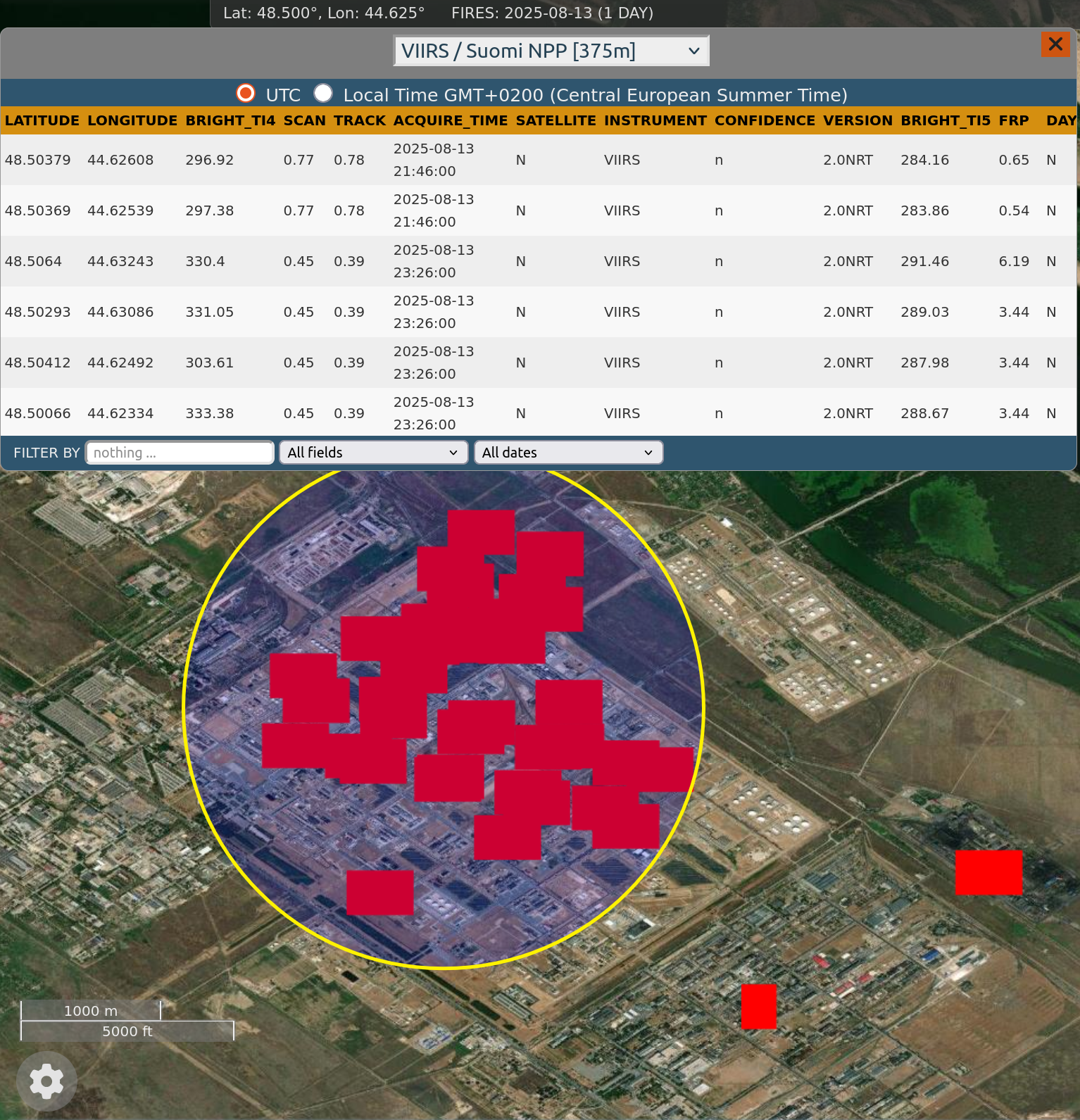
NASA's FIRMS detected extensive fire on 13 August 2025 21:46:00 (UTC) at the Volgograd Refinery

In February 2024, during the Russo-Ukrainian War, the refinery was hit by a drone from the Ukrainian military. On 31 January 2025, Ukrainian drones attacked the refinery again, causing a fire at the facility. Russian sources said the fire was quickly extinguished. On 14 August 2025 the Russian defense ministry claimed to have downed 9 drones overnight in Volgograd Oblast. Volgograd's governor claimed that falling drone debris caused a fire at the Volgograd Refinery. Extensive fire at the refinery was confirmed by NASA's FIRMS, see image. On 15 October 2025, the refinery was struck by Ukrainian drones, with locals reporting explosions and fires.

== See also ==
- List of oil refineries
- Petroleum industry in Russia
