= Filanovsky oil field =

Oil field in the Caspian Sea

Filanovsky Oil Field
- Location within Caspian Sea
- Country: Russia
- Region: Caspian Sea
- Offshore/onshore: offshore
- Coordinates: 45.001919°N 48.480883°E
- Operator: Lukoil

Field history
- Discovery: 1994
- Start of production: 2014

Production
- Estimated oil in place: 170 million tonnes (~ 201.3×10^{6} m^{3} or 1266 million bbl)

The Filanovsky Oil Field is an oil field located in the Caspian Sea. It was discovered in 1994 and developed by Lukoil. The oil field is owned and operated by Lukoil. The total proven reserves of the Filanovsky oil field are around 1.27 billion barrels (170 million tonnes), and production is centered on 160,000 barrels per day (25,000 m^{3}/d).

== See also ==
- Petroleum industry in Russia
