= Emsi =

Lithuanian petrol station chain

- Company type: Private
- Industry: Retail (petrol stations)
- Founded: 1991
- Headquarters: Vilnius, Lithuania
- Area served: Lithuania
- Key people: Jurgita Šindeikė (director)
- Products: Motor gasoline, diesel fuel, LPG, household gas cylinders, convenience goods
- Revenue: €203 million (2024)
- Number of employees: 335 (2025)
- Website: www.emsi.lt

Emsi (stylised EMSI) is a Lithuanian-owned network of petrol stations. Founded in 1991 and headquartered in Vilnius, the company has grown into one of the country's largest domestically owned fuel retail chains. It competes with networks such as Circle K, Viada, Neste, and Baltic Petroleum.

== History ==
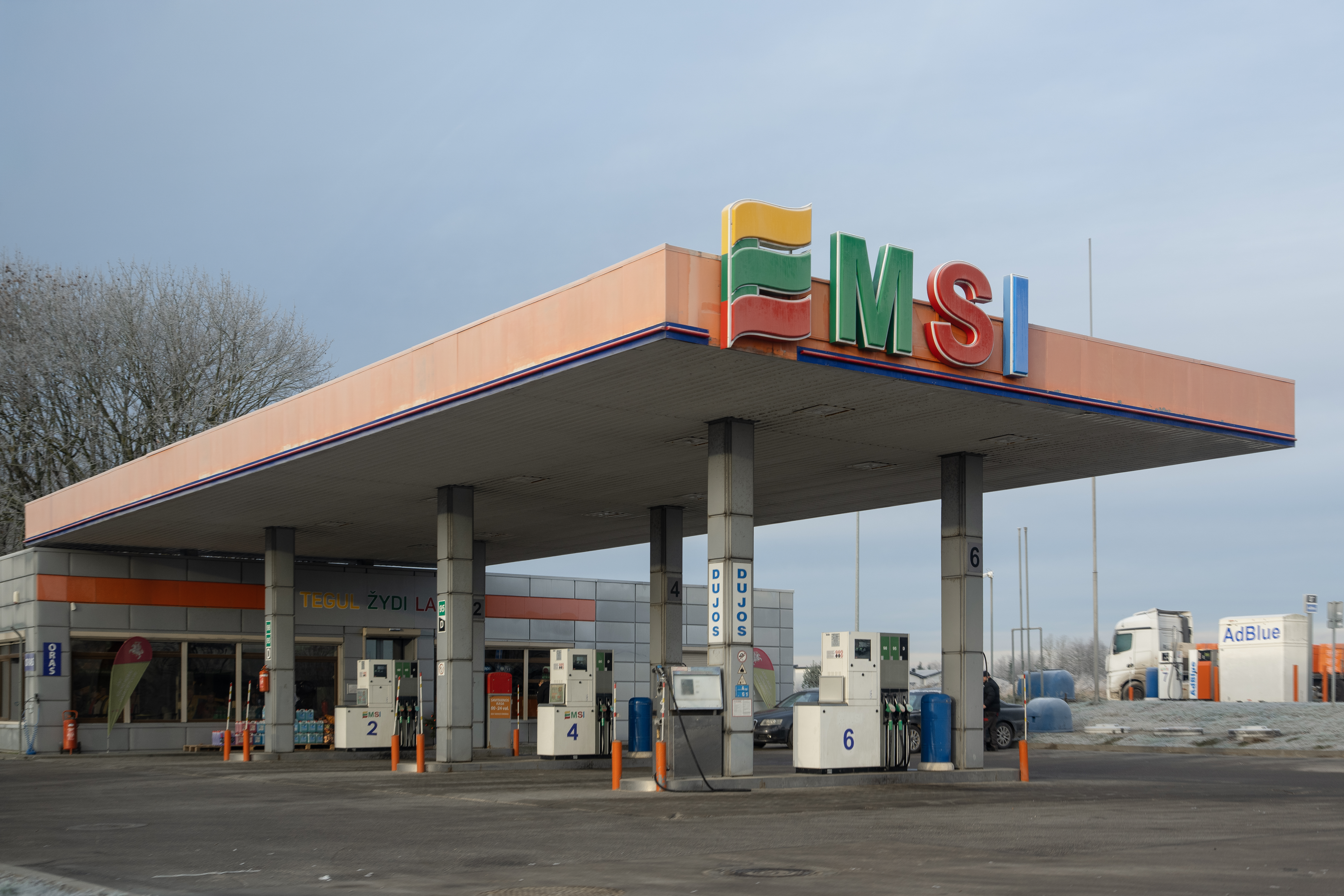
EMSI station in Vilnius

Emsi was founded in 1991 in Vilnius as a private fuel retail company shortly after the restoration of Lithuanian independence. From the beginning it focused on operating filling stations and supplying related petroleum products, including autogas and household gas cylinders.

In the 2000s the network expanded beyond Vilnius by opening new stations and acquiring sites from smaller operators. In 2017 Emsi became the main creditor in the bankruptcy of the fuel retailer Vakuolė, aiming to incorporate stations and land assets into its network. As of 2023 the company operated 45 filling stations, 38 owned and 7 leased, and planned to add 5 sites in 2024.

In March 2024 LRT reported that some Emsi stations were selling plastic “surprise egg” toys decorated with a soldier holding a Russian flag. Communications specialists quoted in the article criticized the sale of such products during the Russian invasion of Ukraine and warned of possible reputational damage to the brand.

On 6 November 2025 the Lithuanian Competition Council fined Emsi €1 million for acquiring control of 4 petrol stations without obtaining the required approval. In 2024 the company had leased two stations in Kaunas from Antira and purchased two additional stations in Vilnius and Maišiagala from Takuras.
