= Lukoil =

Russian oil company

PJSC Lukoil

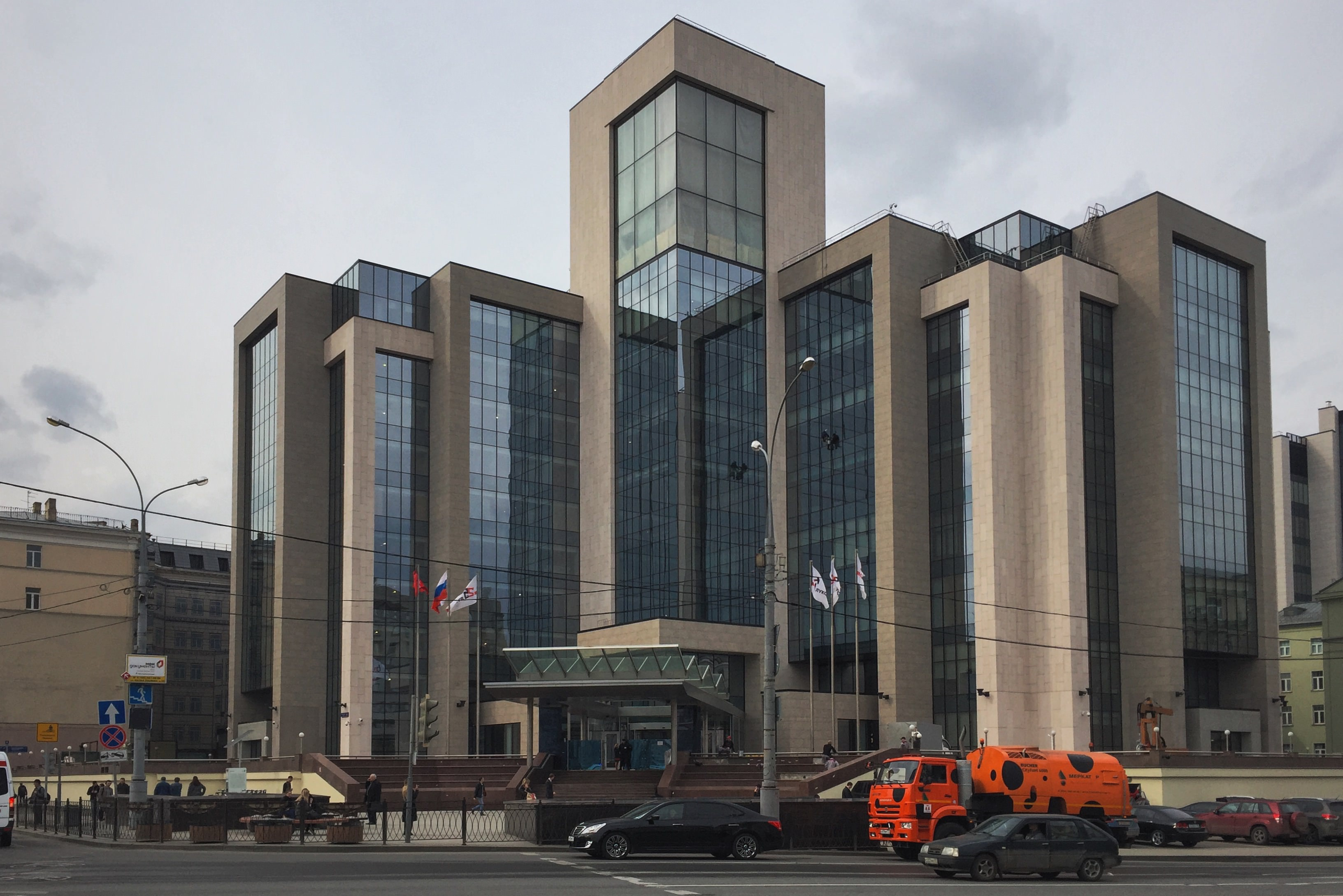
- Lukoil headquarters in Moscow
- Native name: ПAO Лукойл
- Type: Public
- Traded as: MCX: LKOH
- Industry: Oil and gas
- Predecessor: Langepasneftegaz; Urayneftegaz; Kogalymneftegaz
- Founded: 25 November 1991; 34 years ago
- Founder: Vagit Alekperov
- Headquarters: Moscow, Russia
- Number of locations: 5,867 (2014)
- Area served: United States; Europe; Mexico; Kazakhstan; Uzbekistan; Iraq; Egypt; Ghana; Nigeria; Cameroon; Sri Lanka; Azerbaijan
- Key people: Vadim Vorobyov (President & CEO); Leonid Fedun (Vice President)
- Products: Petroleum; Natural gas Petrochemicals
- Revenue: $44.2 billion (2025)
- Operating income: $6.18 billion (2025)
- Net income: −$12.4 billion (2025)
- Total assets: $64.2 billion (2025)
- Total equity: $42.6 billion (2025)
- Number of employees: 101,000 (2019)
- Subsidiaries: see Subsidiaries
- Website: www.lukoil.com

PJSC Lukoil (Russian: ПAO Лукойл) is a Russian multinational energy corporation headquartered in Moscow, specializing in the business of extraction, production, transport, and sale of petroleum, natural gas, petroleum products, and electricity.

It was formed in 1991 when three state-run companies from western Siberia merged. The original companies were named after the towns in Khanty–Mansi Autonomous Okrug where each was based: Langepasneftegaz, Urayneftegaz, and Kogalymneftegaz. Its new name is the combination of the acronym LUK (initials of the oil-producing cities of Langepas, Uray, Kogalym) and the English word oil.

Lukoil is the third largest company in Russia after Rosneft and Gazprom, and the country's largest non-state enterprise in terms of revenue, with ₽4,744 billion in 2018. In the 2020 Forbes Global 2000, Lukoil was ranked as the 99th-largest public company in the world. Internationally, it is one of the world's largest crude oil producers. In 2019, the company produced 87.488 million metric tons of oil (1.639 million barrels per day) and 35.046 billion cubic meters of natural gas. In 2021, it had operations and subsidiaries in more than 30 countries around the world, but as of 2025, that was down to 14 countries. The company's revenue amounted to 2.9 trillion rubles in 2022, and reached 3 trillion rubles in 2024.

== History ==
=== Origins ===
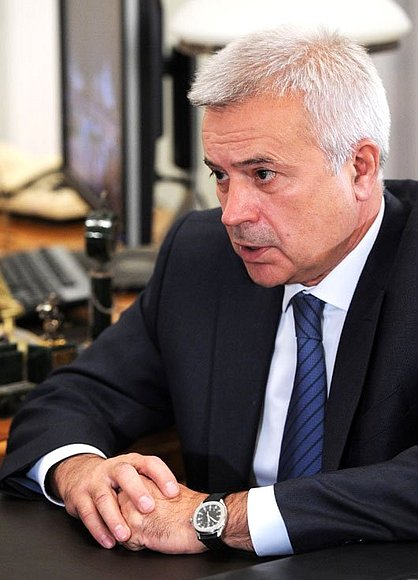
Vagit Alekperov, CEO and founder of Lukoil

"Langepas, Uray, and Kogalym" oil (Lukoil) was established by the Soviet Union Council of Ministers Decree No. 18 on 25 November 1991, as a state-owned enterprise. In the new company, three oil production companies, Langepasneftegaz, Uraineftegaz, and Kogalymneftegaz, processing company Permnefteorgsintez, and the Volgograd and Novosibirsk refineries, were merged (the latter soon came under the control of the authorities of Bashkortostan).

The central figure in the company's founding was the Soviet deputy minister of oil production Vagit Alekperov. He came to believe the only way Russians could compete against Western companies was to copy their business model. That meant vertically integrating the three branches of the industry—exploration, refining, and distribution—that were strictly separate under the old Soviet system.

On 5 April 1993, Lukoil transformed itself from a state-owned enterprise to a private open joint-stock company based on Presidential Decree No. 1403 of 17 November 1992.

=== 1990s ===
In 1994, Lukoil became the first company to begin offering shares of stock on the new Russian Trading System. The Filanovsky oil field was discovered and operated by Lukoil.

In 1995, Lukoil controlled the stakes of nine oil-producing, marketing and service enterprises in Western Siberia, the Urals, and Volgograd Oblast to abide by Government Decree No. 861 of 1 September 1995. In that same year, a 5% stake of Lukoil was sold by the state with a minimum excess of the starting price in an auction. In November 1995, Lukoil filed with the U.S. Securities and Exchange Commission to issue American depositary receipts on Western stock markets. This allowed United States investors, for the first time, to purchase shares in a Russian company.

In 1997, Lukoil signed a contract with the Iraqi Ministry of Oil for the development and production of the second stage of the West Qurna-2 oil field. After Saddam Hussein's regime was overthrown, the project was suspended and later terminated.

In 1999, Lukoil acquired numerous enterprises such as the Odesa Oil Refinery in Ukraine, the Burgas Oil Refinery in Bulgaria, and KomiTEK.

=== 2000s ===
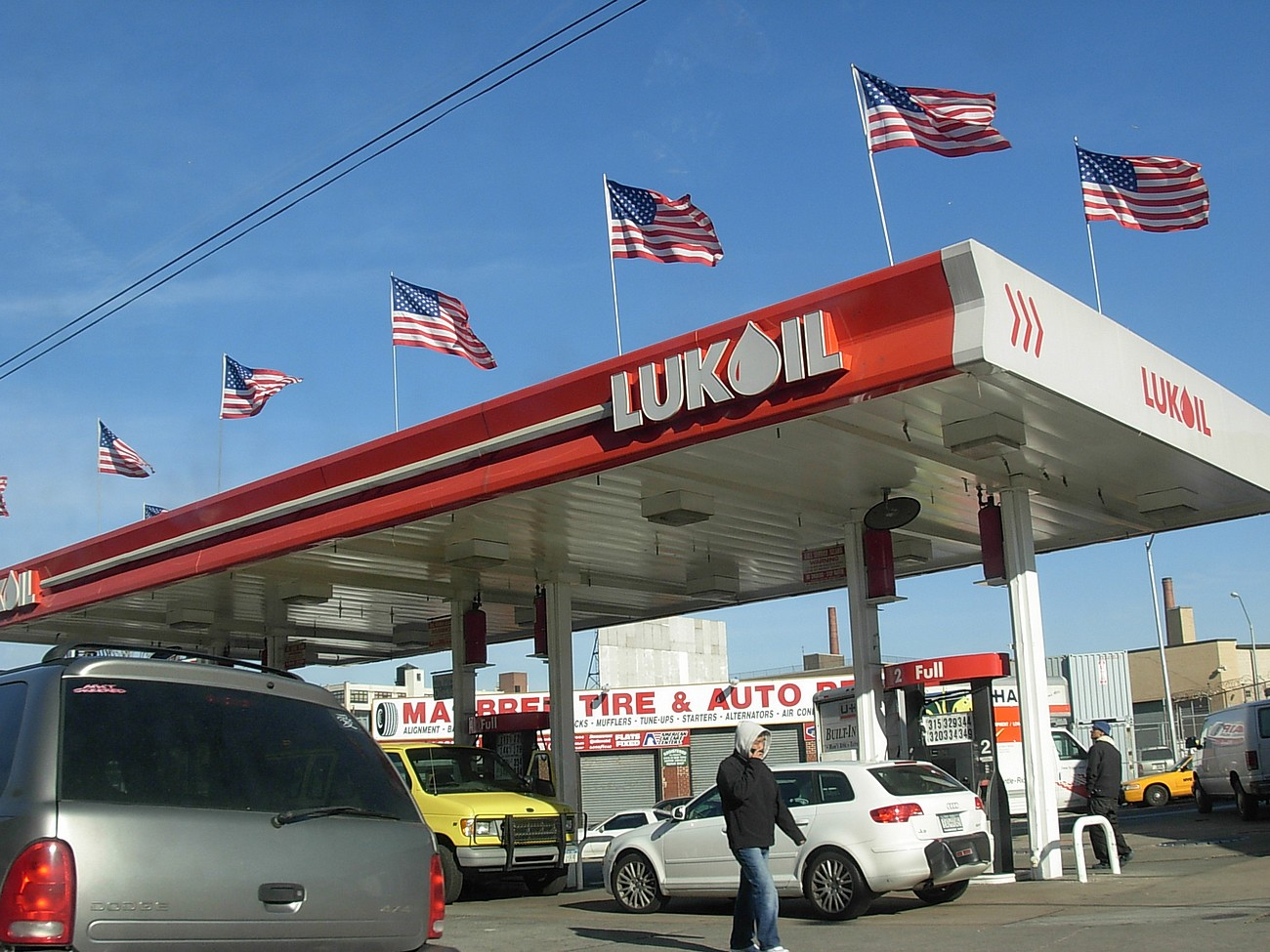
A Lukoil gas station in New York, United States

In 2000, Lukoil acquired the distribution and marketing operations of American oil company Getty Oil. This resulted in the control of a network of gas stations in the United States, as well as the first time Lukoil entered the American oil market.

In September 2004, ConocoPhillips purchased a 7.6% stake in Lukoil for about $2 billion. According to some commentators, the sale of this deal was planned before in a personal meeting between Russian President Vladimir Putin and ConocoPhillips' president and CEO, James Mulva. After the auction, Lukoil and ConocoPhillips announced the creation of a strategic alliance. Later, the American company increased its stake to 20% in Lukoil and sold to the Russian company part of its network of gas stations in the United States and Western Europe. The two oil companies also agreed to jointly develop an oil and gas field in the northern Timan-Pechora area of Russia (Komi Republic) and intended to secure the rights to develop the West Qurna Field in Iraq, one of the country's largest.

Uzbekistan's deputy prime minister Ergash Shaismatov announced on 30 August 2006 that the Uzbek government and an international consortium consisting of state-run Uzbekneftegaz, Lukoil Overseas, Petronas, Korea National Oil Corporation, and China National Petroleum Corporation signed a production sharing agreement to explore and develop oil and gas fields in the Aral Sea, stating "The Aral Sea is largely unknown, but it holds a lot of promise in terms of finding oil and gas. There is risk of course but we believe in the success of this unique project". In December 2006, Lukoil announced the acquisition of 376 filling stations in six European countries: Belgium, the Czech Republic, Finland, Hungary, Poland, and Slovakia, from ConocoPhillips.

In 2007, Lukoil established a joint-venture with Gazprom and in 2008, established a joint-venture as well with Italian oil company Erg S.p.A. In 2009, Lukoil and Norwegian oil company Statoil won a tender offer for the development of the West Qurna Field in Iraq. However, in early 2012, Statoil withdrew from the project, resulting in Lukoil consolidating a 75% stake in the development of the oil field.

=== 2010s ===
From 2010 to February 2011, ConocoPhillips sold its whole 20% stake in Lukoil due to its difficult financial situation. In September 2012, Lukoil created a shared service centre in the Czech Republic to provide accounting services to its subsidiaries in Belgium, Poland, and Bulgaria. In December 2012, Lukoil bought the Imilor field for ₽50.8 billion in the Khanty-Mansi Autonomous Okrug to explore and develop the hydrocarbon deposits located there.

In February 2013, Lukoil sold the Odesa Oil Refinery to the Ukrainian "East European Fuel and Energy Company" (VETEK). For Lukoil, the oil refinery was unprofitable even before production was stopped as early as October 2010, and it finally closed in the summer of 2013. In April 2013, Lukoil agreed to buy Hess Corporation's Russian unit for $2.05 billion.

In 2014, the company faced a sharp decline in retail sales in Ukraine by 42%, caused by Russian invasion of Ukraine. As a result, the management of Lukoil agreed to sell 100% of its subsidiary Lukoil Ukraine to the Austrian company AMIC Energy Management, which was announced at the end of July 2014. In 2014, Lukoil sold its service stations in the Czech Republic, Slovakia, and Hungary. In 2015, it sold its service stations in Estonia and Ukraine, and in 2016, it sold its service stations in Latvia, Lithuania, Poland, and Cyprus.

=== 2020s ===
In March 2022, Lukoil's market stock price dropped 95 percent, as a result of international sanctions during the 2022 Russian invasion of Ukraine. On 21 April 2022, Lukoil issued a statement saying that president Vagit Alekperov had stepped down and resigned from the board of directors after 29 years. The Norwegian state-owned oil company Equinor exited the last of their joint ventures in Russia by withdrawing the joint venture with Lukoil and exiting the Kharyaga project on 2 September 2022. In 2023, Lukoil stated they were planning to double the production of oil from the Iraq project, West Qurna-2, to 800,000 bpd. By November 2025, they had achieved only 60% of the goal, at 480,000 barrels per day; still making it approximately nine percent of Iraq's total oil output.

Lukoil was involved in schemes of illegal party financing and money laundering by the group of Moldovan pro-Russian fugitive oligarch Ilan Shor, as reported on a 16 September 2025 Moldovan newspaper Deschide.MD article, citing sources from Moldova's State Fiscal Service (SFS).

In November 2025, Gunvor made a $22 billion offer to acquire Lukoil’s international assets, including oil refineries in Romania and Bulgaria, petrol stations in Europe and the United States, and oil and gas operations in the Middle East, Central Asia, and Africa. The proposed purchase came after U.S. sanctions were imposed on Lukoil and other Russian oil companies. In November 2025, Gunvor withdrew its bid after the U.S. Treasury announced that it would block the deal, describing the company as a “Kremlin’s puppet” and stating that no licence would be issued while Russia’s invasion of Ukraine continued. Gunvor rejected the allegations as “fundamentally misinformed and false,” emphasizing that it had sold its Russian assets more than a decade earlier and had publicly condemned the invasion.

On 4 November 2025, Lukoil declared force majeure at the West Qurna-2 oil field in Iraq, which Lukoil owned a 75% stake of, due to the impact of Western—especially U.S. and British—sanctions, and may exit the field entirely. Iraq immediately halted all cash and crude oil payments to Lukoil. The field had been producing around 480,000 barrels per day, approximately nine percent of Iraq's total oil output.

== Operations ==
=== Oil and gas production ===
==== Hydrocarbon reserves ====
The company's proved hydrocarbon reserves as of 1 January 2011, amounted to 17.255 billion barrels of oil equivalent, including 13.319 billion barrels of petroleum and 0.67 trillion cubic meters of natural gas. In terms of proved oil reserves, Lukoil, according to its own information, was the sixth-largest private oil company in the world at the time.

In addition, probable hydrocarbon reserves as of 1 January 2011 were 8.46 billion barrels of oil equivalent (including oil, 6.47 billion barrels of petroleum, and 0.34 trillion cubic meters of natural gas). Possible reserves were 3.17 billion barrels of oil equivalent (including 2.78 billion barrels of petroleum and 65.7 billion cubic meters of natural gas).

==== Major oil fields ====
Rank	Field	Production (thousand tons) (2007)
1	Tevlinsko-Russkinskoye	9,486
2	Vatyeganskoye	8,086
3	Povkhovskoye	6,183
4	Pocachevskoye	3,582
5	Yuzhno-Yagunskoye	3,142
6	Kharyaga	2,874 (2007); 1,560 (2021)
7	Kogalym	2,793
8	Pamyatno-Sasovskoye	2,464
9	Urievskoye	2,227
10	Usinskoye	2,113

Since 2016, Lukoil has been attempting to obtain a development license for the Nadezhda field in the Baltic Sea, located in the Kaliningrad region, which is outside the Continental shelf and reserved for state companies only. In October 2021, due to ecological risks, the Russian government withdrew its decision to grant a license for geological exploration at the Nadezhda field.

==== Domestic projects ====
In December 2011, Lukoil established a joint venture with Bashneft to develop the Trebs and Titov oil fields. Total recoverable reserves and oil resources from these fields are 89.73 million tons in C1 category, 50.33 million tons in C2 category and 59.29 million tons in category C3.

==== Foreign projects ====
The operator of Lukoil's foreign projects in the exploration and production sector is its subsidiary, Lukoil Overseas.

Lukoil is involved in the implementation of 16 projects for the exploration and development of structures and deposits in the following countries:

- Azerbaijan (D-222 (Yalama), Shah-Deniz)
- Cameroon (Etinde floating LNG project)
- Egypt (Meleiha, West Esh-El-Mallah, West Geisum, Northeast Geisum)
- Ghana (Cape Three Points Deepwater)
- Colombia (the Condor project in conjunction with the Colombian state company Ecopetrol)
- Iraq (West Qurna-2)
- Iran (Anaran)
- Ivory Coast (production sharing agreement on the offshore block CI-205 in the Gulf of Guinea)
- Kazakhstan (Tengiz, Karachaganak, Kumkol, Karakuduk, Northern Buzachi, Alibekmola, Kozhasai, Arman, Zhambai South, Atash, Tyub-Karagan)
- Romania
- Saudi Arabia
- Uzbekistan (Kandym-Khauzak-Shady-Kungrad, Aral, Kungrad, South-West Gissar)
- Venezuela (Junin Block 3)

The extraction of hydrocarbons from all the above projects is carried out only in Kazakhstan (5.5 million tons of oil and 1.9 billion cubic meters in 2006) and Egypt (0.2 million tons).

=== Oil and gas processing ===
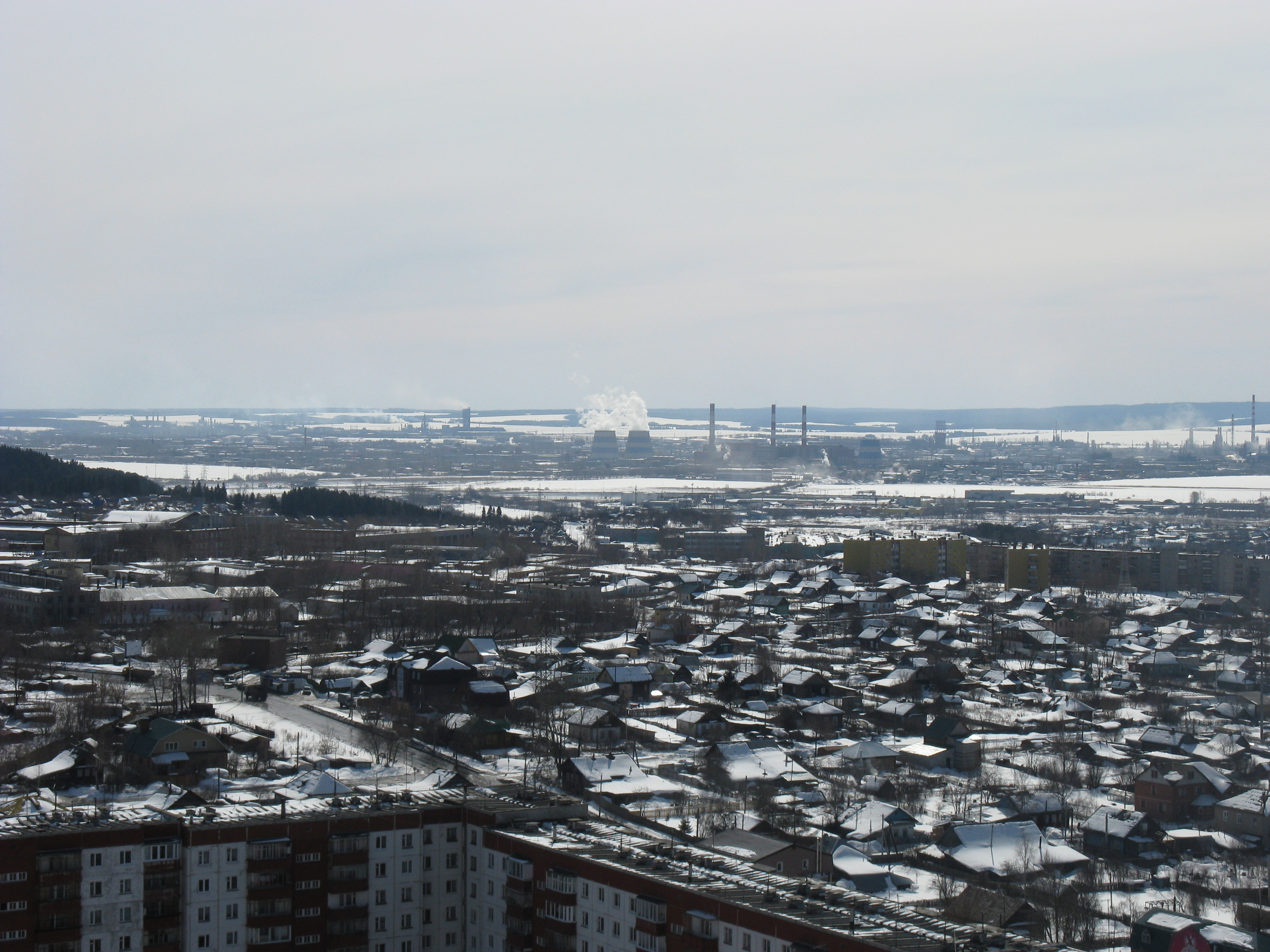
Lukoil refinery in Perm

Lukoil owns seven oil-processing companies in Eastern Europe, with a total annual capacity of 82.1 million tons. In Russia, it owns large refineries in Volgograd, Perm, Nizhny Novgorod, and Ukhta refineries and mini-refineries in Uray and Kogalym. It also owns refineries in Bulgaria and Romania and holds a 45% stake in an oil refining complex in the Netherlands. In 2020, the company was also in talks to reconstruct a refinery plant in Cameroon, which belongs to Cameroon's national refining company, Sonara.

Country	Name	Location	Launched	Acquired	Capacity, mln tpa
(Russia)	Lukoil-Nizhegorodnefteorgsintez	Kstovo	1958	2000	15.0
(Russia)	Lukoil-Permnefteorgsintez	Perm	1958	1991	12.0
(Russia)	Lukoil-Volgogradneftepererabotka	Volgograd	1957	1991	9.9
(Russia)	Lukoil-Ukhtaneftepererabotka	Ukhta	1934	2000	3.7
(Bulgaria)	Lukoil Neftochim Burgas	Burgas	1964	1999	7.5 ‡
(Romania)	Petrotel Lukoil Refinery	Ploieşti	1904	1998	2.4 ‡
(Netherlands)	Zeeland Refinery (share with TRN)	Vlissingen	1973	2009*	7.9*

* – 49% and 45% shares respectively

‡ do not process Russian crude oil

Speaking at a press conference in New York on 18 October 2006, the company's CEO Vagit Alekperov said Lukoil is refusing to build a new refinery in Russia. According to him, "at this stage it is inexpedient and economically inefficient." At the same time, Lukoil planned to build a large complex in Kalmykia for the processing of natural gas from the North Caspian fields worth over $3 billion. The work was supposed to start in the spring of 2008. Also in March 2007, Lukoil announced it would expand the capacity in the Lukoil Neftochim Burgas refinery in Burgas, Bulgaria from 7.5 million tons to 10 million tons of oil per year.

The Lukoil ISAB refinery in Italy was sold in 2023.

=== Petrochemistry ===
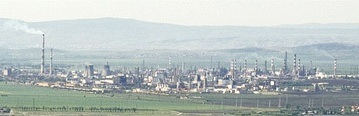
The Lukoil Neftochim Burgas refinery in Burgas, Bulgaria

The subsidiary company Lukoil-Neftekhim specializes in petrochemistry, and operates the Stavrolen (Budyonnovsk), Saratovorgsintez, and the Karpatneftekhim (Kalush, Ukraine) petrochemical plants. Petrochemical facilities are also part of the Neftochim Burgas Combine in Bulgaria. "Lukoil" is the largest producer of alkene and acrylonitrile in Eastern Europe. Together with Sibur, Lukoil-Neftekhim owns a controlling stake in the Polief plant.

=== Transportation ===
Transportation of oil produced by Lukoil in Russia is carried out for the most part by the pipelines of Transneft, as well as by rail and water transport. Oil produced at the company's fields in Kazakhstan is transported through pipelines such as the Caspian Pipeline Consortium.

Lukoil owns several oil and oil products terminals used for the export of oil and oil products:

- The terminal near Varandey off of the Barents Sea with a capacity of 12.5 million tons of oil a year is used for shipment of oil produced in the Timan-Pechora Basin.

=== Sales ===
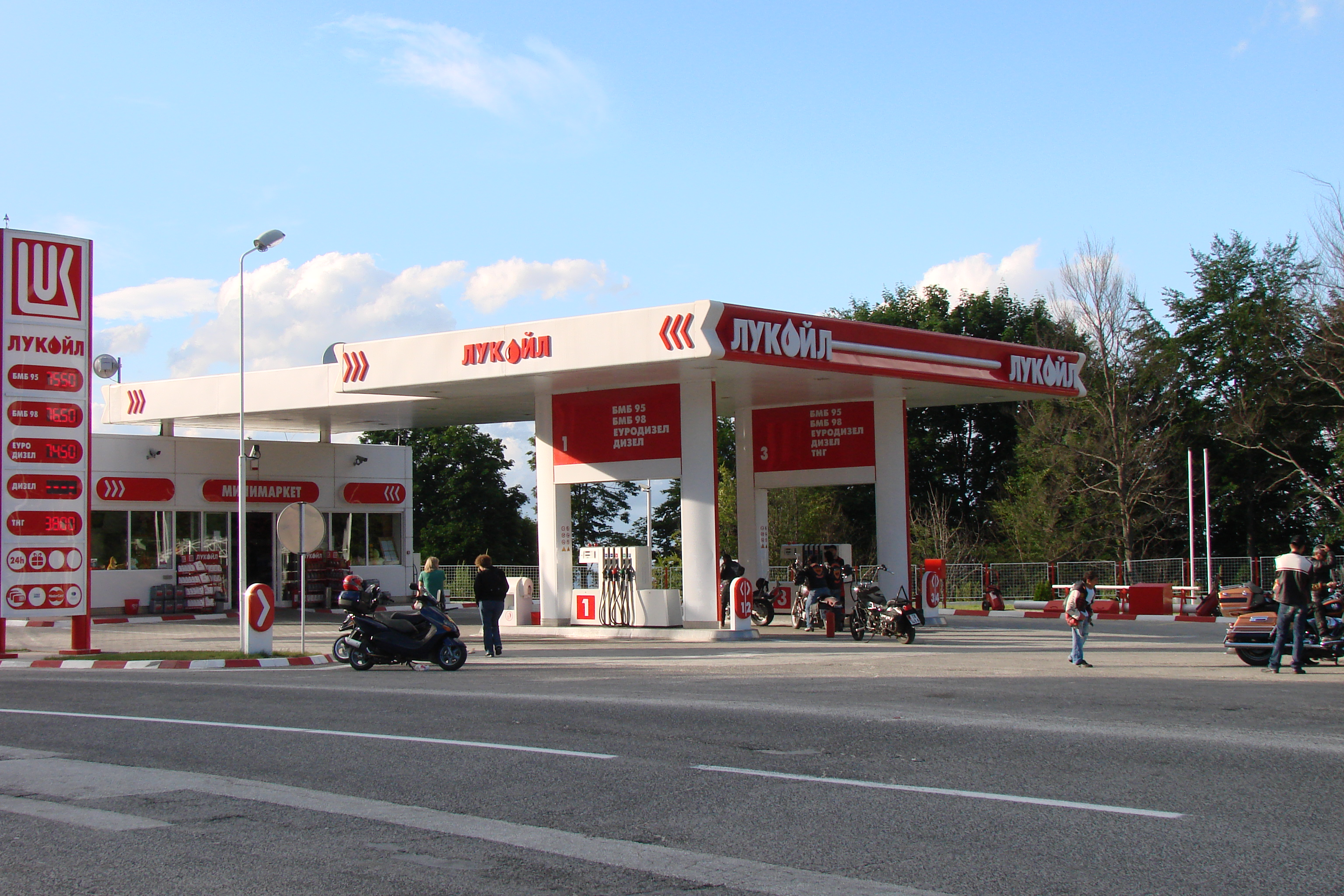
A Lukoil gas station in North Macedonia

Lukoil sells petrol in 59 regions of Russia and in 17 other countries, both CIS and Western: Azerbaijan, Belarus, Belgium (through its subsidiary Jet until late 2008, since rebranded to Lukoil), Bulgaria, Croatia (operated by Lukoil Croatia, but under the brand name "Europa-Mil"), Finland (Teboil), Georgia, Italy, Luxembourg, Moldova, Montenegro, Netherlands, North Macedonia, Romania, Serbia, Turkey and the United States. As of January 2014, it had 166 tank farms and 5,867 filling stations.

As of 2025, it has about 200 gas stations in the United States.

=== Power generation ===
Lukoil has an aggregate power generation capacity of 5,800 MW, of which 73% is for commercial use. Lukoil generates about 99% of the electrical power of the Astrakhan Oblast and 62% of the Krasnodar Krai. Its principal power generation subsidiaries are Lukoil-Volgogradenergo, Lukoil-Rostovenergo, Lukoil-Kubanenergo, Lukoil-Astrakhanenergo, and Lukoil-Stavropolenergo.

Lukoil operates two solar power plants at its own refineries in Romania and Bulgaria, with respective capacities of 9 MW and 1.3 MW. A 10-MW solar plant is under construction at the Volgograd Refinery. It also owns an 84-MW wind farm in Topolog, Romania.

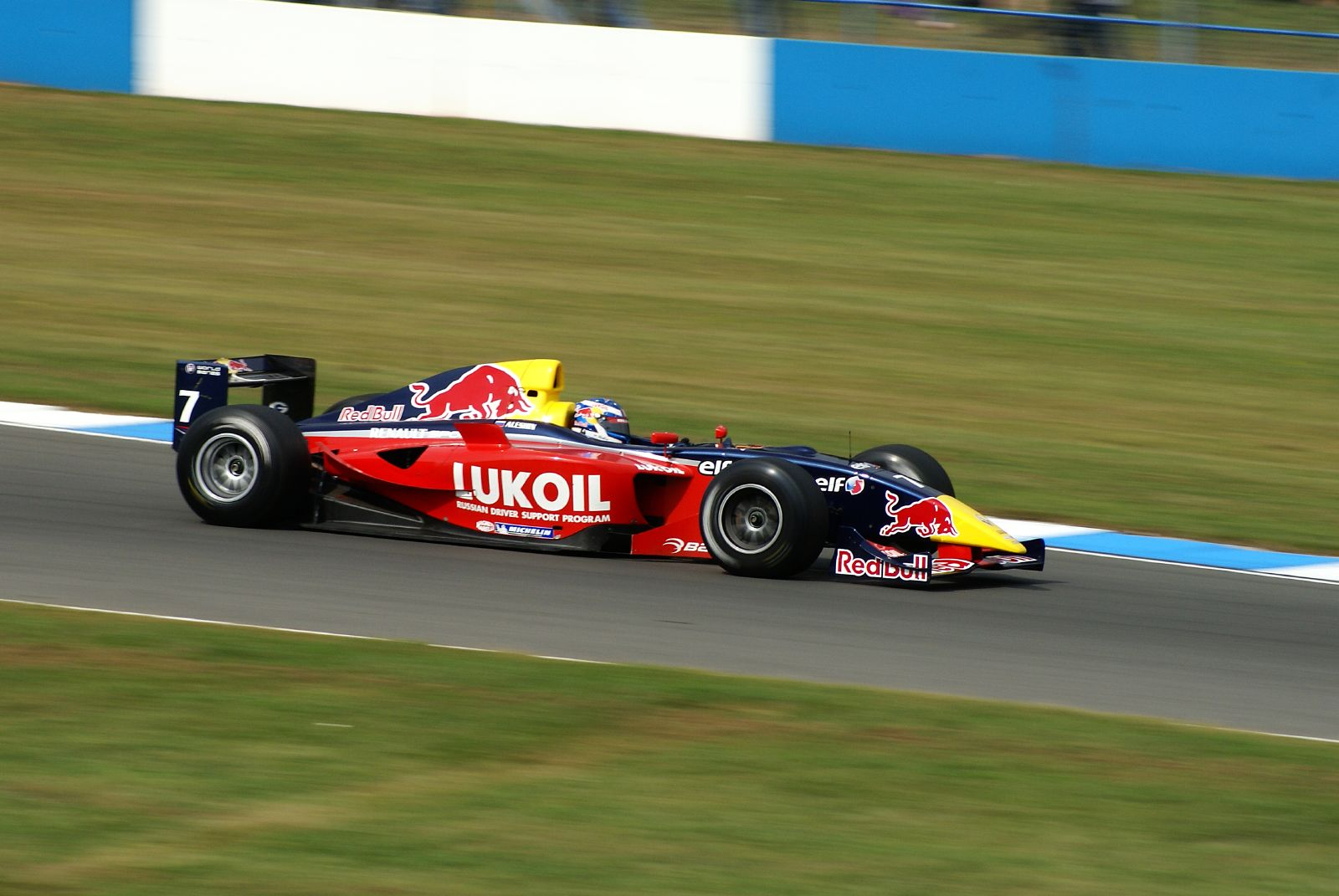
Mikhail Aleshin driving Lukoil sponsored car in Formula Renault 3.5 Series

=== Sponsorship ===
Lukoil has been the titular sponsor of FC Spartak Moscow since 2000. In August 2022, the company acquired ownership of the club (100% of the shares) along with the Otkritie Arena stadium.

In particular, the company sponsors the Volgograd water polo club Lukoil-Spartak. Lukoil also sponsors the Russian Olympic Committee and is one of the founders of the Russian Olympians Support Fund. In February 2014, Lukoil signed an agreement with the government of Arkhangelsk Oblast about supporting Vodnik.

== Corporate affairs ==
=== Shareholders ===
In July 2010, the top managers of the company owned the largest stake (more than 30%) of the company's shares: CEO Vagit Alekperov owning 20.6% and vice-president Leonid Fedun owning 9.8%. The American oil company ConocoPhillips owned 19.21% but, due to financial difficulties, completely withdrew from the shareholders of Lukoil, selling its shares, and in part to Lukoil itself by February 2011. The remaining shares were freely traded on the London Stock Exchange, the Frankfurt Stock Exchange, the Russian Trading System, and the Moscow Interbank Currency Exchange. The company's market capitalization was $60.4 billion as of June 2018.

=== Management ===
Chief executive officer

- 1993–2022: Vagit Alekperov
- 2022–present: Vadim Vorobyev

Board of directors

List of directors that were elected on 21 June 2018:

- Vagit Alekperov - CEO
- Ravil Maganov, Chairman of the Board
- Boris Porfiryev
- Victor Blazheev
- Lyubov Khoba
- Leonid Fedun
- Sergey Shatalov
- Pavel Teplukhin

Unusual deaths

In September 2022, chairman Ravil Maganov died after falling from a hospital window. This was not long after board member Alexander Subbotin had died an unusual death. Maganov's replacement as chairman, Vladimir Ivanovich Nekrasov, died suddenly in October 2023. In March 2024, vice president Vitaly Robertus died suddenly.

=== Effects from Russo-Ukrainian War ===
In March 2022, Toby Gati, Roger Munnings and Wolfgang Schüssel left the board of directors due to International sanctions during the Russo-Ukrainian War.

During the 2022 Russian invasion of Ukraine, the chairman of Lukoil Ravil Maganov had criticised the Russian attack on Ukraine. On 1 September 2022, he was found dead outside his hospital window, the day that President Putin visited the hospital. Nearby video cameras had been turned off. The company has acknowledged the death in a statement saying that Ravil Maganov: "passed away following a severe illness".

The refinery in Italy was sold in 2023, the one in Bulgaria was allowed to continue after agreeing to pay taxes in Bulgaria and the refinery in Romania was permitted to continue provided it only refined non-Russian oil. In September 2023, the Bulgarian authorities transferred the Rosenets port oil terminal under state control. By parliamentary decision, Lukoil's 35-year concession was terminated early without payment of compensation.

=== Subsidiaries ===
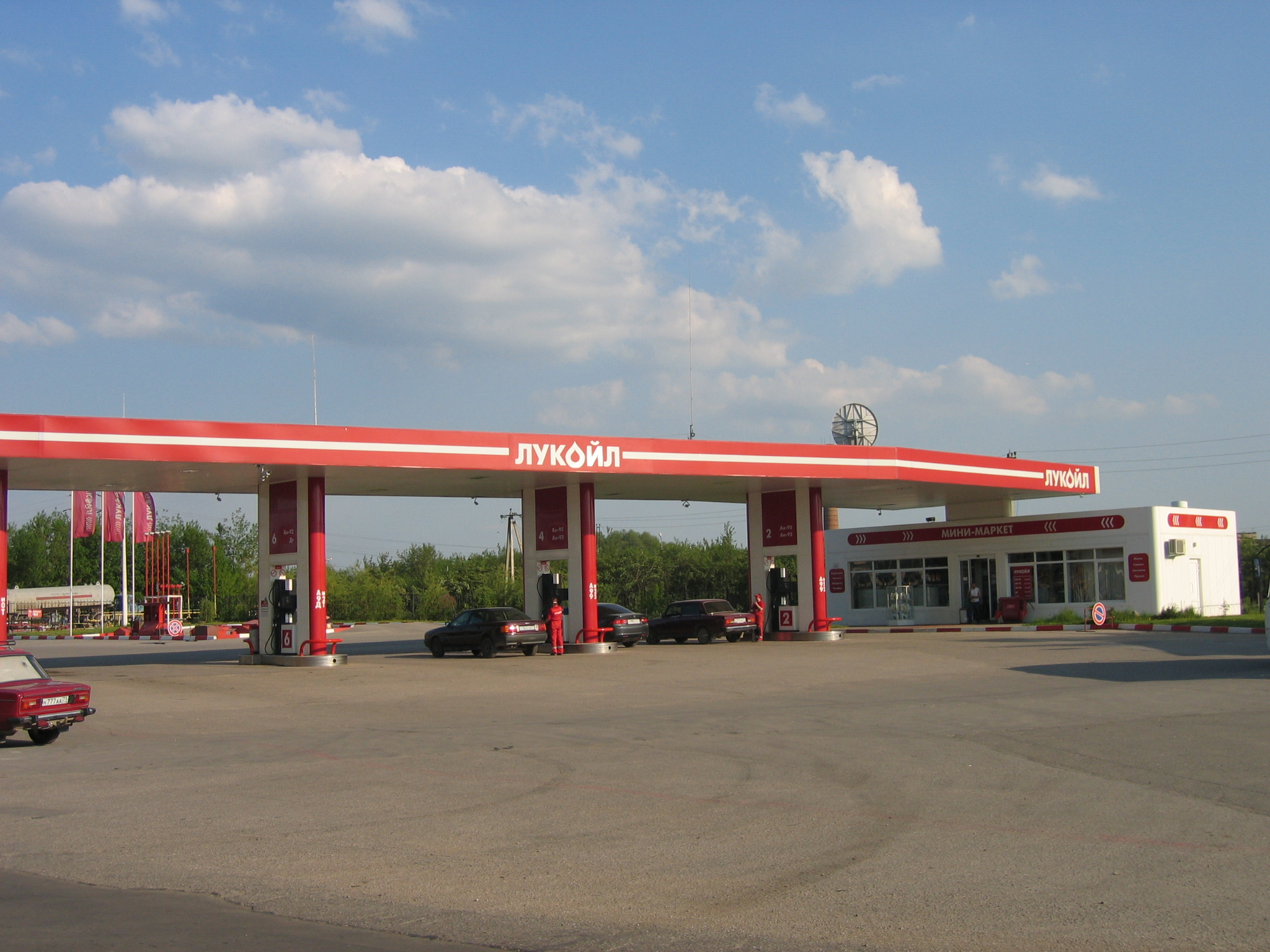
A Lukoil gas station in Tula, Russia

The company "Lukoil" owns controlling stakes or otherwise controls the following main organizations:

- Lukoil-Western Siberia
- Lukoil Centernefteproduct
- Lukoil-Volganefteproduct
- Lukoil-KaliningradMorneft (Kaliningrad)
- Lukoil-Komi
- Lukoil Neftechim
- Lukoil-Nizhnevartsk milling factory
- Lukoil Chernozemchenefteproduct
- Lukoil-Nizhnevarq Neft
- Lukoil Overseas Holding Ltd. (Perm)
- Lucoil-Permeagnophosphoretic Acid
- Lukoil-Permnefteproduct
- Lukoil-Perm
- Lukoil-Severo-Zapadnefteproduct
- Lukoil-Severnefteproduct
- Lukoil-Energogas
- Lukoil-Yugnefteproduct
- Lukoil Americas Corporation
- LITASCO
- Lukoil Bulgaria ЕООД
- Lukoil Macedonia Ltd.
- Lukoil Croatia
- Lukoil Serbia AD
- Lukoil-Engineering
- Lukoil-Inform
- Lukoil-Energosethy
- Lukoil-Uralnefteproduct
- Lukoil-Uhtanepoparerepotka
- Lukoil-Ecoenergo
- Lukoil-Rostovenergo
- Lukoil-Energoinjing
- Lukoil-TsUR
- Lukoil-Astrakhanenergo
- Lukoil-Kubanenergo
- Lukoil-Volgogradenergo
- Lukoil-TTK
- RITEK
- Trade house "Lukoil"
- Lukoil-Inter-Card
- Lukoil-Belorussia (Minsk, Belarus),
- Lukoil-Belgium N.V. (Belgium)
- Lukoil-Reservnnefteproduct
- Arkhangelskgeolaspredka (Arkhangelsk)

== Environmental record ==
According to Lukoil, their numbers for 2007 showed a 7.8% decrease in the volume of pollutant effects and a 3.8% decrease in the area of contaminated lands compared to 2006. These numbers came after an appeal from EMERCON, the Ministry of the Russian Federation for Civil Defense, Emergencies and Natural Disaster Recovery, which proposed that Lukoil participate in the development of monitoring, prevention, and emergency recovery systems.

In an effort to increase productivity, Lukoil organized a contract to commence oil pumping operations in the Azerbaijani sector of the Caspian Sea. It conducted an Environmental Impact Assessment of the drill site to facilitate a second exploration drill. This block, D-222, was the largest prospective structure in the north-east section of the Caspian Sea as of 2008. The key issue was to assess how much damage the oil block would inflict on local fish populations. Taking into account the depth of the operation, around 700 meters, the amount of harm was projected to be minimal, with the majority of the damaged marine life being plankton and benthos. A rescue and salvage ship would be stationed there to mitigate the environmental effects on the area. Lukoil would develop contingency plans for oil spills and implement an environmental monitoring system.

At the same time, Lukoil faces criticism from various environmental organizations. In particular, the company's oil production in the Baltic Sea near Kaliningrad Oblast was criticized as it is 22 kilometers away from the Curonian Spit, a UNESCO World Heritage Site. According to several critics, Lukoil has inherited the worst environmental standards of the Soviet oil industry, failing to take sufficient responsibility for minimizing pollution in its oil fields and refineries. Lukoil has been ranked as among the 14th best of 92 oil, gas, and mining companies on indigenous rights and resource extraction in the Arctic. In the Arctic Environmental Responsibility Index (AERI), Lukoil is ranked no. 37 out of 120 oil, gas, and mining companies involved in resource extraction north of the Arctic Circle.

== Controversies ==
=== Environmental incidents ===
On one of the storage ponds at JSC "Lukoil-Volgograd-neftepererabotka" between 25 July and 8 August 1996, oil sludge was ignited due to the improper conduct of welding operations. The surface layer of oil products was formed during the last two decades, and a similar ignition in this area was already noted in 1972. As a result of the 1996 fire, approximately 50,000 tons of oil products were burned, as the soil at this site was already saturated with volatile fractions. Where the fire was first lit, the concentration of carbon monoxide exceeded the permissible standards by almost 28 times, nitrogen dioxide tripled, hydrogen sulfide and phenol more than 1.5 times. In the residential areas of the Krasnoarmeysky district of Volgograd, located 7 km from the fire, as well as in the nearby settlements - B. and M. Chapurnik, Dubov Gully, Chervlen, Tingut - the content of combustion products in the air also exceeded the maximum permissible concentration. In the liquidation of this major technogenic emergency with severe environmental consequences, the divisions of the Ministry of Emergency Situations of Russia took part.

In the autumn of 2003, the Russian Emergencies Ministry revealed the oil spill as a result of the depressurization of the interfacial oil pipeline belonging to the TPP Lukoil-Usinskneftegaz on the territory of the Komi Republic near the city of Usinsk. The area of oil pollution in one case was about 1.8 thousand m^{2}, in the second - 377 m^{2}.

On 25 January 2011, at about 10:00 (local time), as a result of oil leakage in the engine room of LGPZ (CCI "Langepasneftegaz"), there was a fire. More than 50 firefighters extinguished the fire. The plant suspended its work.

On 20 April 2012, at the Trebs field, jointly developed by Lukoil and Bashneft, an accident occurred that caused significant damage to the natural environment. Over the course of a day, oil continued to flow from the reopened well, resulting in large-scale contamination of the surrounding territory. According to the press service of the administration of the Nenets Autonomous Okrug, the contamination area exceeded 5 thousand square meters, the volume of spilled oil, according to Bashneft, was 600 tonnes (in independent sources, numbers were up to 2.2 thousand tonnes).

On 11 May 2021, a leakage was identified in a pipeline connected to Lukoil's Oshkoye field. The spill was estimated at 100 tons of oil, yet environmentalists argued that 100 tons is an underestimate. The spill had infiltrated the Kolva river and traveled upstream, affecting the river habitats. Russia's Northwest Komi Republic declared an emergency. The damage was estimated at $4.1 billion.

=== Ukrainian investigation ===
In January 2015, the Security Service of Ukraine announced an investigation into whether Lukoil had financed separatists in Donbas.

=== Antitrust law violations ===
In November 2009, the Federal Antimonopoly Service of Russia (FAS) imposed a record fine of ₽6.54 billion on the company for violating antitrust legislation. The fine was imposed for the abuse of the company's dominant position in the wholesale market of petroleum products in the first half of 2009, expressed in "the seizure of goods from circulation" and the creation of "discriminatory conditions for the sale of petroleum products to individual counterparties". As FAS has calculated, these actions led to an increase in prices in the wholesale markets of motor gasoline, diesel fuel, and aviation kerosene in the first half of 2009.

=== Cambridge Analytica ===
In March 2018, the data firm Cambridge Analytica, tied to the 2016 Trump Campaign, was accused of discussing "political targeting" of American voters with representatives of Lukoil. "Cambridge Analytica sought to identify mental and emotional characteristics in certain subsets of the American population and worked to exploit them by designing them to activate some of the worst vulnerabilities in people, such as neuroticism, paranoia and racial biases," whistleblower Christopher Wylie told the Senate Judiciary Committee in 2018. With Lukoil, the consulting firm shared election disruption strategies, which included videos and posters intended to demoralise and alarm voters. Lukoil is on the Sectoral Sanctions Identifications list, has been linked to Russian influence in the past, and CEO Vagit Alekperov, a former oil minister, had made statements suggesting that he considers helping Russia to be a strong political ambition.

=== VP driving accident ===
On 25 February 2010, Lukoil's vice president Anatoliy Barkov crashed his Mercedes S500 into a Citroën C3 car with doctor Olga Alexandrina and famous obstetrician Vera M. Sidelnikova inside; both women died in the collision. The General Administration for Traffic Safety blamed the driver of the Citroën. Still, it was suggested that the administration was covering up the fact that the real culprit of the accident was the driver of the Mercedes, who, according to eyewitnesses, had driven around a traffic jam and entered the oncoming lane. There is also speculation that the driver of the Mercedes was the vice president of Lukoil himself. A few days after the accident, the Head of the State Traffic Safety Inspectorate of Moscow issued a notice of misconduct to the commander of the Traffic Police battalion who registered the accident on Leninsky Avenue because he had prematurely called the driver of the Citroën, Olga Alexandrin, the culprit of the accident. The incident sparked a public reaction, particularly a boycott of the company's gas stations. Blogger Andrei Bocharov announced a mock advertisement of Lukoil based on this accident, and rapper Noize MC wrote the song "Mercedes S666 (Make Way for the Chariot)".

=== Bulgaria ===
In July 2011, Lukoil had a conflict with Bulgarian authorities. According to the latter, the company's Bourgas refinery did not have timely installed meters for the manufactured fuel (used to determine the amount of excises paid), which, according to officials, Lukoil allegedly underpaid about €250 million to the country's budget. As a result, the company lost its license and was shut down, but in early August 2011, the plant was relaunched.

In 2023, Bulgaria took the decision to force Russian energy companies out of the country, and increased the tax rate to 60% on the Lukoil Neftohim Burgas profits, hoping the plant would be sold. Bulgaria also banned the export of refined Russian oil from 1 January 2024 and the import of Russian crude oil from 1 March 2024.

=== Romania ===
In October 2023, Romania invalidated the petroleum products wholesale trading licence that had been held by the Swiss-registered subsidiary of Lukoil, Litasco SA, which supplies crude oil to and distributes refined oil from the Petrotel Lukoil Refinery. Apart from a tax dispute, Romania claims the refinery does not disclose the source of its crude oil, the amount it processes, or where the refined oil is distributed.

=== Sanctions ===
On 11 September 2014, US President Obama said that the United States would join the EU in imposing tougher sanctions on Russia's financial, energy and defence sectors, following the escalation of Russo-Ukrainian War. The U.S. added Lukoil to the Sectoral Sanctions Identifications list on 12 September 2014.

The effect of sanctions in 2022 against shipped Russian oil has had a detrimental effect on the Priolo Gargallo ISAB refinery in Sicily, with an inability to bring in oil from Russia and related cash flow finance problems. This has resulted in the refinery being put under Italian trusteeship with a buyer being sought.

New Zealand has sanctioned Lukoil. On 22 October 2025, the U.S. imposed further sanctions on Lukoil.

== Criticism ==
- The Association of Small and Medium-Sized Oil Production Enterprises, also known as Assoneft, criticized Lukoil and the authorities of the Komi Republic for providing tax breaks to the oil companies of the region, which are obliged to extract at least 7 million tons of oil per year and (or) recycle at least 3 million tons. Only two enterprises — Lukoil-Komi and Lukoil-Ukhtaneftepererabotka — correspond to these conditions in the region. In March 2007, the Federal Antimonopoly Service initiated a case against the State Council of the Komi on the grounds of violation of Part 1 of Art. 15 of the Law "On Protection of Competition" concerning restricting competition in the oil production and refining markets.
- In October 2005, then-prime minister of Lithuania, Algirdas Brazauskas, was at the center of the scandal involving Lukoil. The opposition of the Lithuanian parliament, Homeland Union, began collecting signatures for the creation of a parliamentary commission to investigate the entrepreneurial activity of Brazauskas' wife, Christina Butrimene-Brazauskiene, in particular with the acquisition of a 38% stake in the elite Vilnius Crowne Plaza hotel from the wife of the head of the Lukoil-Baltija company. The charges were related to Lukoil's contention at that time for a stake in one of the largest enterprises in Lithuania, the oil refinery ORLEN Lietuva, part of Polish energy company ORLEN. Brazauskas rejected allegations of corruption, but admitted his wife owns 51% of the hotel shares, and another 48% belongs to his son. On 22 November, at the insistence of the country's president Valdas Adamkus, Algirdas Brazauskas spoke on television, saying he was not involved in the privatization of the hotel, and that all charges should be considered by law enforcement bodies, not by the parliamentary commission.
- On 14 September 2012, more than fifty Lukoil gas station owners in New Jersey and Pennsylvania temporarily raised their prices to over $8 a gallon to protest Lukoil's wholesale gas pricing. The owners are typically charged a wholesale price that is 5 to 10 cents a gallon more than their competitors, and some are assessed an additional 25 to 30 cents per gallon based on their location. According to the station owners, this makes it difficult to be competitive with stations that sell more established brands for lower prices.
- In March 2016, there were accusations by the press of the company not acquiring rights to part of the Massandra vineyards in Crimea.

== See also ==
- Companies of comparable role
  - Exxon-Mobil
  - Shell plc
- List of companies of Russia
- Petroleum industry of Russia
- Suspicious deaths of Russian businesspeople (2022–2024)
