= Parallel (filling stations) =

- Company type: Private
- Industry: Retail and logistics. Retail and wholesale trade in petroleum products. Retail trade in food and household goods. Logistics centers.
- Founded: April 18, 1996
- Revenue: UAH 11 billion (2025)
- Owner: System Capital Management (1996-2020), Oleksandr Dubinin (since 2020)
- Number of employees: 454 (2025)
- Parent: Parallel-M Ltd
- Website: parallel.ua

Parallel is a Ukrainian group of companies, a fuel importer, and a filling stations chain in Ukraine. The group's key operating entity is Parallel-M Ltd., and the sole ultimate beneficiary of the group is Oleksandr Dubinin.

The company sells motor fuel wholesale and retail. It is among the top ten largest Ukrainian importers of petroleum products.

The network of filling stations was established in the 1990s and initially developed in the eastern regions of Ukraine. The company was part of Rinat Akhmetov’s SCM Group. Filling stations were located in the Dnipropetrovsk, Donetsk, Zaporizhzhia, and Luhansk regions. In 2020, the asset was acquired by Ukrainian entrepreneur Oleksandr Dubinin, who is the sole beneficiary of the group.

The company also operates convenience stores and mini-markets in a "near-home" format. It has several distribution centers for food and household goods.

== History ==
The Parallel filling station chain was founded on April 18, 1996 with the construction of gas station "Nafta" in Donetsk and purchasing the petroleum depot in Kuteynikovo village. During 1996–2003, 7 more gas stations in Donetsk and Makiivka were opened. In February 2003 a contract with Mažeikių Nafta (Lithuania) was signed for high-quality fuel supplies. Parallel and Mažeikių Nafta signed an exclusive agreement of sale of gasoline Ventus 98 and Ventus 95 in September 2003 and of fuels Ventus Diesel and Ventus 92 in 2004. The chain was part of the System Capital Management (SCM) industrial group. It expanded most significantly in the Donetsk, Luhansk, Dnipropetrovsk, and Zaporizhzhia regions.

In 2006 the company opened its first mini-market (convenience store) under TM ZZZIP!! at the gas stations and established its own quality laboratory. In 2007, seven more gas stations of the new format were opened in Donetsk and Makiivka. In 2007, the quality control laboratory of Parallel-M Ltd won the 4th all-Ukrainian competition of goods quality "100 Best Goods of Ukraine" in the nomination "Laboratory testing services for oil products" and the company started selling gasoline and Perfekt diesel fuel.

In 2008, five more filling stations were opened. Perfekt gasoline from "Parallel" was awarded during the final round of the all-Ukrainian contest "100 Best Goods of Ukraine". The same year Parallel became the official partner of FC Shakhtar Donetsk.

In 2009, 47 gas filling stations under TM Gefest and one station under TM PitStop passed into Parallel management. As a result of this transaction, the number of objects controlled by Parallel increased from 20 to 68, and geographical coverage expanded from one to eight regions of Ukraine, staying mainly in the eastern and central regions of the country. In 2010 the company conducted rebranding of 29 stations under TM Gefest into the Parallel network in Donetsk Oblast. Two gas stations in Donetsk were reconstructed, three new filling stations in Luhansk and one hand car wash in Makiivka were opened.

According to Research and Branding Group, brand recognition in Donbas exceeded 94%. Nearly every other motorist in the region refueled at a filling station under the Parallel brand. The chain regularly ranked among the Top 200 largest companies in Ukraine according to Forbes Ukraine magazine. In 2013, Parallel ranked 87th on the list.

War in eastern Ukraine significantly affected the network’s operations. Filling stations in territories not controlled by Ukraine were lost. Due to the Russian occupation of parts of eastern and southern Ukraine, the number of gas stations decreased significantly in 2022.

The SCM Industrial Group considered selling this business. Negotiations with various prospective buyers lasted several years. In November 2020, the Parallel filling station network was acquired by Oleksandr Dubinin, a businessman engaged in the wholesale supply of petroleum products. The value of the deal was not officially disclosed. According to the owner, the purchase was financed by a bank loan, which was subsequently repaid.

== Activities ==
Parallel operates a network of gas stations in various regions of Ukraine and is expanding its geographic presence from the east of the country to the central and western regions. Since 2022, following a change in ownership, approximately 350 million UAH has been invested in the network’s development. As of November 2024, 31 filling stations were operating in Dnipropetrovsk, Odesa, and Kyiv regions, as well as in the Ukraine-controlled territories of Donetsk and Zaporizhzhia regions. As of July 2025, there were 76 filling stations operating in 8 regions.

The company is a direct importer of fuel and works directly with manufacturers. According to the company, its supplier portfolio is based on the principle of diversification and includes both direct contracts with manufacturers (in particular Orlen Lietuva), which provide the core supply, and cooperation with international trading companies (Naftatrans, Oktan Energy, Vitol), which supply resources from European manufacturers (Neste Oyj, Preem AB, Hellenic Petroleum, Motor Oil), American (ExxonMobil), and Middle Eastern producers (including Yasref, Saudi Arabia).

The logistics model is based primarily on road transport: according to the owner, the group uses about 500 fuel tankers.

The company is developing ancillary retail operations. In 2025, pilot convenience stores were opened under the Parallel Market brand.

== Financial indicators ==
In 2025, the group’s EBITDA increased by approximately 300 million UAH compared to 2024. Revenue grew by a quarter, reaching approximately 11 billion UAH. Fuel sales volume increased by a third, while the share of non-fuel revenue reached 23%. In 2025, the company paid approximately 1.8 billion UAH in taxes.

== Discounts for Military Personnel ==
According to the company, as of early November 2025, active-duty military personnel had saved over 1.1 million UAH on fuel, coffee, and groceries at the Parallel-branded gas station network thanks to the "Plusy" program, implemented in cooperation with the Ministry of Defense of Ukraine. Since September 10, 2025, when the network joined this initiative, military personnel have made over 24,000 purchases at the group’s gas stations. Under the "Army+" program, total sales amounted to 7.9 million UAH in diesel fuel, 5.6 million UAH in gasoline, and 2.9 million UAH in autogas.
