= Spirit Petroleum =

- Company type: Petroleum brand
- Industry: Petroleum
- Founded: 2002
- Headquarters: Soap Lake, WA
- Area served: United States
- Website: SpiritPetroleum.com

Spirit Petroleum is an American petroleum brand created in 2002 by the Petroleum Marketers Oil Corporation, LLC. The corporation, which is majority-owned by the Energy Marketers of America (EMA), has been based in Soap Lake, Washington since 2016. Currently fuel stations in 32 states are flagged with the Spirit brand.

== History ==
In early 2000, the Energy Marketers of America (formerly Petroleum Marketers Association of America), a federation of 47 state and regional trade associations representing independent petroleum marketers (jobbers) across the United States, began exploring the possibility of establishing a for-profit LLC to own and manage a national petroleum brand. PMAA's goal was to increase brand access to independent petroleum marketers in the wake of industry mergers and consolidations that reduced the number of available brands in the late 1990s. The Petroleum Marketers Oil Company (PMOCO), currently managed by a volunteer committee of petroleum wholesalers and chief executives of state petroleum-marketer associations, was created in October 2000. EMA is the majority owner of PMOCO. The first Spirit fuel stations opened in Jena, Louisiana and Boyce, Louisiana in November 2002.

== Supply ==
PMOCO does not require licensees of the Spirit brand to purchase a set amount of fuel from a designated source at a designated price. To supply Spirit-branded stations, petroleum marketers acquire unbranded gasoline from suppliers of their choosing at pricing terms they establish with those suppliers.

== Trademarks and Brand Image ==
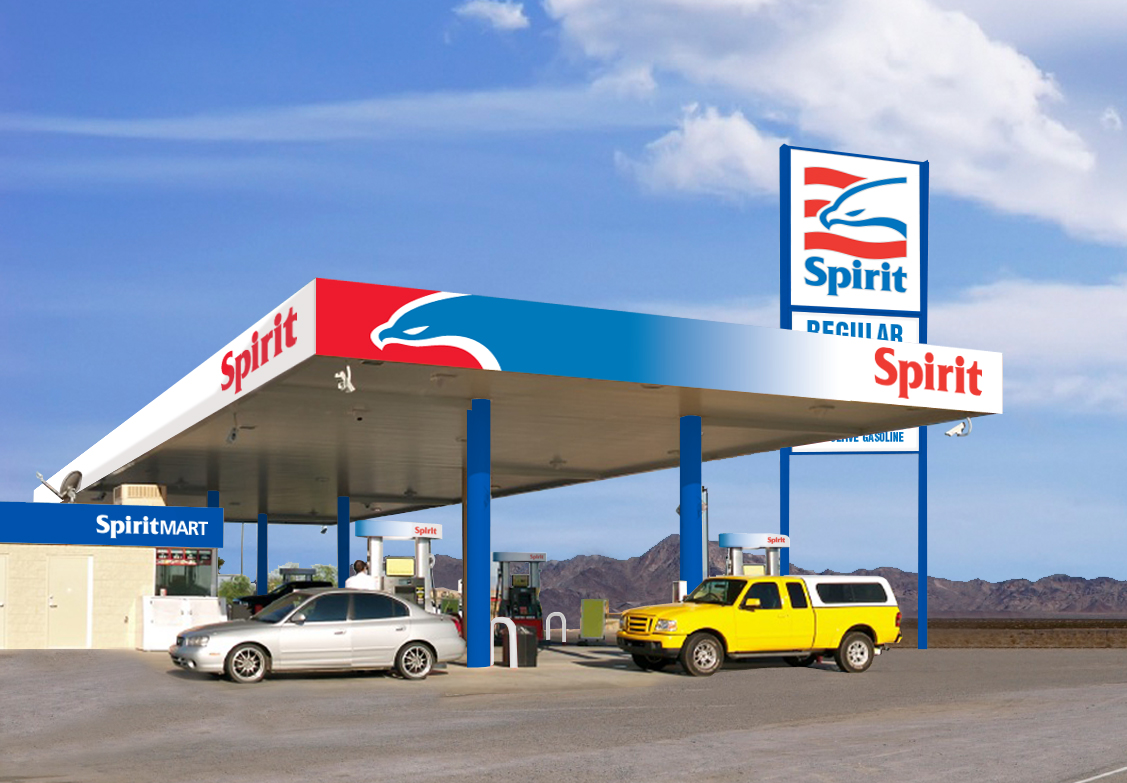
Spirit Petroleum retail site

The name Spirit and the brand's associated image are registered trademarks. The Spirit brand's trademarked image centers on a stylized blue and white eagle over flowing red and white bars that evoke the stripes of the American flag.
