= Joseph-Alexandre Crevier =

French-Canadian doctor

Joseph-Alexandre Crevier (1824–1889) was a French-Canadian medical doctor who discovered the microbial transmission of cholera as well as a powerful remedy. He was also a naturalist.
