= Huck's Market =

American convenience store chain

- Company type: Private
- Industry: Retail
- Founded: 1974 (52 years ago)
- Founders: Bob Martin; Frank Bayley
- Headquarters: Carmi, Illinois, United States
- Number of locations: 136 (April 2026)
- Area served: Midwestern United States
- Services: Convenience store; Gas station; Fast food
- Owner: Martin & Bayley, Inc. (Employees (100%))
- Number of employees: 2,500 (April 2026)
- Website: www.hucks.com

Huck's Market, formerly known as Huck's Now and more recently Huck's Food & Fuel, is a chain of convenience stores headquartered in Carmi, Illinois, operating as a subsidiary of Martin & Bayley, Inc. As of September 2025, there are over 134 Huck's stores located across Illinois, Indiana, Kentucky, Missouri and Tennessee.

Martin & Bayley was founded in 1960, beginning its existence when Bob Martin and Frank Bayley formed a partnership and opened the Big John's Supermarket chain in Southern Illinois. In 1974, Martin & Bayley opened the first Huck's location in Grayville, Illinois. Huck's has been an employee-owned corporation since 2001, employing over 1200 people, primarily in rural areas.

Huck's launched its new loyalty program, Huck's Bucks Bigg Rewards, in June 2020 during the COVID epidemic with great success.
