= Amic Energy =

Austrian energy firm

- Company type: GmbH
- Industry: Energy
- Founded: 2013
- Founders: Günter Maier; Wolfgang Ruttenstorfer; Heinz Sernetz; Johannes Klezl-Norberg; Manfred Kunze
- Headquarters: Vienna, Austria
- Number of locations: 470 mobile and stationary filling stations; 20 charging stations for electric vehicles
- Areas served: Austria; Latvia; Lithuania; Poland; Ukraine
- Key people: Günter Maier (Managing Director)
- Owners: Günter Maier; Johannes Klezl-Norberg; Andreas Sernetz; Gillen Philip Andrew
- Subsidiaries: Amic Electric GmbH; SIA Amic Latvia; UAB Amic Lietuva; Amic Polska sp. z o.o.; Amic Ukraine CFI
- Website: amicenergy.com

Amic Energy (stylized as AMIC ENERGY) is an Austrian company that operates a network of over 470 mobile and stationary filling stations and 55 charging stations for electric vehicles in Austria, Latvia, Lithuania, Poland, and Ukraine. The company is headquartered in Vienna. As of 2020, Amic Energy was the fifth-largest network in Ukraine by sales volume and held a 6.7% share of the Ukrainian retail fuel market.

== History ==
=== Origins ===
Amic Energy Management GmbH was founded in 2013. It started as an investment company looking for low-cost and problematic assets for further restructuring. One of the company's strategic goals was to invest in undervalued assets in Central and Eastern Europe, particularly in the energy infrastructure sector. Initially, the company considered investing in power plants in Romania and Bulgaria, as well as other projects in Poland. However, when Lukoil announced the sale of its assets in Eastern Europe in 2014, Amic Energy became interested in the possibility of acquiring a filling station network in Ukraine. When Lukoil's management commented on its plans to sell in July 2014, it said that it wanted to focus on Russian projects, as international sanctions on Russia made it difficult for the company to access capital. Since 2014, Lukoil has sold assets in the Czech Republic, Ukraine, Estonia, Latvia, Slovakia, Lithuania, Poland, and Hungary. For example, Lukoil's assets in the Czech Republic were bought by the Hungarian MOL Group, in Hungary and Slovakia by the Hungarian company Norm Benzinkút Kft, in Estonia by the local network Olerex.

=== Acquisition of assets in Ukraine ===
The main agreement between Amic Energy and Lukoil to purchase all the shares of Lukoil-Ukraine, which owned about 240 petrol stations and 6 oil depots in Ukraine, was announced in July 2014. At that time, Lukoil controlled 6% of the retail market in Ukraine, behind the petrol station networks of Privat group, WOG, and OKKO companies. The total value of the deal was estimated at US$280 million (€256.5 million). In April 2015, the Anti-Monopoly Committee of Ukraine approved the company Amic Energy Management GmbH (Vienna, Austria) to take control of Lukoil-Ukraine CFI (Kyiv). In May 2015, Lukoil-Ukraine CFI changed its name to Amic Ukraine CFI, and the company's petrol stations began to change their names.

=== Acquisition of assets in Latvia, Lithuania, and Poland ===
In February 2016, Amic Energy entered into an agreement with Lukoil Europe Holdings BV to acquire a network of approximately 230 petrol stations in Latvia, Lithuania, and Poland (UAB Lukoil Baltija in Lithuania, SIA Lukoil Baltija R in Latvia, and Lukoil Polska sp. z o.o. in Poland). Lukoil's management justified the company's plans to sell assets in Latvia and Lithuania with the anti-Russian sentiment in these countries. The completion of the acquisition was announced in April 2016.

Under the terms of the agreement, AS Viada Baltija and UAB Luktarna took over the retail networks in Latvia and Lithuania, respectively. In 2018, Amic Polska began rebranding its petrol stations in Poland to the Amic Energy brand. The rebranding was completed in July 2019. In October 2019, Amic Energy acquired two petrol stations in Cieszyn, Poland from BP, bringing the company's total number of petrol stations in Poland to 116.

=== Russian invasion of Ukraine (2022) ===
Since the beginning of the 2022 Russian invasion of Ukraine, Amic Energy has continued to provide fuel to consumers at gas stations and to the country's critical infrastructure, including supplying jet fuel to the Ukrainian Defense Forces. As of February 25, 2022, two Amic Ukraine gas stations located near the Antonivskyi Bridge in Kherson were destroyed as Russian troops were passing through the bridge. On February 28, 2022, the company's oil depot near Borodianka (Kyiv region) was also destroyed. It was later revealed that Amic Ukraine had shared the oil depot's coordinates with the Ukrainian government for the Armed Forces of Ukraine to destroy the depot after its seizure by Russian troops. The company estimates that the shelling of the depot resulted in the loss of approximately €4 million worth of assets. As of February 2023, 36 petrol stations of Amic Ukraine were damaged, looted, or destroyed, and 19 others were still in temporarily occupied territories of Ukraine. As of April 2023, the company estimated that €20 million worth of its assets (gas stations, oil depot, and fuel) had been damaged due to hostilities.

=== Lawsuit to the European Court of Human Rights ===
In January 2023, Amic Ukraine filed a lawsuit against Russia with the ECHR. In the lawsuit, the company claimed hostile actions against the civilian population of Ukraine, its sovereign territory, Amic Energy employees, and the company as a whole that demonstrate Russia's gross violation of Article 1 of Protocol 1 to the European Convention on Human Rights, which guarantees the right to peaceful possession of property. In particular, after the illegal seizure of certain territories of Donetsk, Kherson, and Zaporizhzhia regions of Ukraine by Russian troops, the property of Amic Ukraine was seized, looted, and in some cases destroyed by the Russian army and the occupation authorities controlled by the terrorist country. The preliminary amount of damages claimed in the lawsuit is over ₴300 million (€8.5 million).

In April 2023, the ECHR opened proceedings on the claim of Amic Ukraine against Russia. The case is entitled "Company with foreign investments Amic Ukraine v. Russia". As of April 2025, the case remained under consideration by the ECHR. In April 2025, the Security Service of Ukraine announced charges against Russian citizen Sergei Yeliseyev and collaborators Vladimir Saldo and Sergei Razdrogin in connection with the 2022 seizure of gas station network assets, including those of Amic Energy, during the temporary occupation of territories in Kherson Oblast.

=== Network development ===
==== In Ukraine ====
In November 2022, following the de-occupation of Kherson, Amic Energy resumed operations in the city by reopening the first of its gas stations in Kherson; in February 2023, the second one was reopened. In 2022–2023, the company also restored gas stations in Kyiv, Mykolaiv, and the village of Herasymivka, Sumy Oblast that had been destroyed or damaged by Russian forces. As of January 2024, 13 previously damaged gas stations had been restored.

In early 2024, Amic Energy in Ukraine updated a number of gas stations with a loft-style design. Throughout 2024, the company modernized 12 gas stations with the new design, including in Volyn, Kirovohrad, and Cherkasy oblasts. As of April 2025, Amic Energy operated 201 gas stations in Ukraine, while 13 remained damaged or located near the front line, and 19 were on temporarily occupied territories.

==== In Poland ====
As of December 31, 2023, Amic Energy’s network in Poland comprised 118 gas stations. In September 2024, an Amic Energy station in Legnica was renovated. In October 2024, the company announced the acquisition of 9 gas stations from Lux-Motor Oil in nine different locations across Poland and introduced a new gas station format under the Amic Box brand in Gabryelin. By the end of 2024, the process of rebranding and integrating the acquired Lux-Motor Oil stations into the Amic Energy network had begun. As of November 2024, the Polish network consisted of 128 gas stations under the Amic Energy brand. In April 2025, a renovated station was opened in Przewodowo-Parcele, followed by another in Świerkowo in May 2025.

As of June 2025, 70 Amic Energy service stations in Poland featured Subway restaurants, and 10 stations hosted Sbarro pizzerias. Amic Energy’s partnership with the Subway network has been ongoing since 2018; the company is the largest Subway franchisee in Poland. In December 2024, the 69th Subway restaurant was opened at a station in Leszno, and in May 2025, the 70th restaurant opened at a station in Poznań. The collaboration with Sbarro began in 2022; in November 2024, two new Sbarro outlets were opened at stations in Wrocław and Warsaw, followed by Poland’s first drive-through Sbarro pizzeria, which opened at a station in Brzeżno in March 2025.

==== In Austria ====
Since 2020, Amic Energy has been developing a network of fast EV charging stations for electric vehicles. In Austria, the company collaborates with Smatrics (a subsidiary of Verbund) and CPI Europe (formerly Immofinanz). As of March 2025, 15 fast EV charging stations had been opened. Another 5 stations with 25 fast charging points are planned to be opened during 2025, including in Mattersburg, Eisenstadt, Voitsberg and other locations. In 2025, Amic Energy also installed fast charging points at a Metro hypermarket in Wiener Neustadt as part of a separate partnership program with Metro Austria and Smatrics.

== Social responsibility ==
According to the company’s estimates, since the beginning of the 2022 Russian invasion of Ukraine and as of August 2024, Amic Ukraine has provided more than ₴112 million (€2.4 million) in support of the government and people of Ukraine, military units of the Security and Defense Forces, state institutions, charitable organizations, and personnel. By the end of 2024, the total amount of charitable assistance provided by Amic Energy in Ukraine since the beginning of the full-scale invasion had reached 126 million UAH (€2.84 million).

=== Assistance to the Defense Forces of Ukraine ===
- According to the company, from 2022 to 2024, Amic Ukraine donated more than 330 thousand liters of fuel to the units of the Armed Forces of Ukraine, the Security Service, the National Police, the State Border Guard Service, military administrations and territorial communities of different regions. In addition, the company donated military clothing sets, body armor, thermal imagers, secure tablets, quadcopters, binoculars, Motorola radio control systems, Antidron KVSG-6+ anti-drone rifle, and more to the Armed Forces of Ukraine.
- In September 2022, Amic Ukraine signed a charitable assistance agreement with the 242nd Battalion of the Territorial Defense Forces (military unit A4081) to provide for the needs of the military unit for a total of ₴10 million (€265 thousand).
- In November 2022, Amic Ukraine and the Razom for Ukraine charitable foundation launched a joint initiative Razom with Amic to deliver tactical medical supplies and communications equipment for Ukrainian soldiers, as well as humanitarian aid to frontline settlements. As of December 2022, Amic Energy had provided the foundation with over 20,000 liters of fuel, worth more than ₴1 million (€25 thousand).
- In the spring of 2023, Amic Ukraine became the general partner of the 11th Austrian Film Week festival in Kyiv, which was held with the support of the Austrian Embassy in Ukraine. All proceeds from ticket sales during the film festival in Kyiv were doubled by Amic Ukraine and transferred to a special account of the National Bank of Ukraine to support the Armed Forces of Ukraine. Following the 12th festival in 2024, the company also matched the proceeds from ticket sales and donated the doubled amount to the Serhiy Prytula Charity Foundation for the purchase of Starlink systems for the 55th Separate Artillery Brigade Zaporizhzhia Sich. In 2023, the festival was held in Kyiv, Lviv, Vinnytsia, and Chernivtsi; in 2024, it also expanded to Dnipro. In 2025, the festival covered Kyiv, Lviv, Chernivtsi, Vinnytsia, Kharkiv, and Dnipro. In addition to traditional cinema screenings, it was supplemented by free online showings of films from earlier editions of the festival on the Megogo platform. After the conclusion of the film festival, Amic Energy will again match the total box office proceeds and direct the doubled amount to support Ukraine.
- In early August 2023, together with the Dignitas Fund, (Note: Official website of the Dignitas charitable foundation) Amic Energy launched the Mavic from Amic (MAVIC від AMIC) (Note: Official website of "Mavic by Amic" — a joint charitable initiative of Amic Energy and the Dignitas foundation) initiative to provide the Armed Forces with DJI Mavic 3 drones. Under the terms of the initiative, ₴5 (€0,12) from each fuel receipt was transferred to purchase hundreds of DJI Mavic 3 drones (various models). As of February 2024, Amic Energy had allocated approximately ₴8 million (€196 thousand) to purchase the first 100 DJI Mavic 3 drones, which were transferred to the Armed Forces of Ukraine. In March 2024, the initiative additionally funded the purchase and delivery of 25 DJI Mavic 3T (Thermal) drones. In June 2024, an additional 75 DJI Mavic 3 drones were funded and delivered. In total, as of September 2024, Amic Energy had funded over ₴17 million (€368 thousand) and supplied 200 reconnaissance drones to more than 110 military units within the Security and Defense Forces. As of March 2025, the total amount of funds allocated for the purchase of drones reached ₴24 million (€546 thousand), and 250 DJI Mavic 3 drones (various models) had been delivered.
- In April 2024, Amic Energy equipped the training camp of the 3rd Separate Assault Brigade of the Armed Forces of Ukraine by purchasing airsoft grenades and pellets, safes for weapon storage, gun cleaning supplies, car tires, fire extinguishers, and other assistance totaling ₴550 thousand (€12.9 thousand). The company also provided fuel to the brigade on a monthly basis.
- In November 2024, Amic Energy and the Serhiy Prytula Charity Foundation announced a new format of cooperation under the Invincible Coffee charitable initiative to support Ukraine's Defense and Security Forces. At the time of the announcement, Amic Energy had already transferred ₴2.6 million (€57 thousand) to the Serhiy Prytula Foundation for the refitting of the first four command and staff vehicles (CSVs) for the military; in January 2025, it provided funds for equipping three more CSVs, and in April 2025, for another four CSVs, totaling nearly ₴1.4 million (€30.9 thousand). Additionally, in December 2024, Amic Energy financed one more CSV by canceling Christmas celebrations and gifts for business partners in December 2024. As of April 2025, the total revenue from hot drink sales directed under the Invincible Coffee charitable initiative (for military and humanitarian purposes) exceeded ₴21 million (€465 thousand). In April 2025, Invincible Coffee won the “Business and Charity Partnership” category at the Responsible Country competition organized by MMR.ua.

=== Supporting recovery needs ===
- In December 2022, Amic Ukraine launched the Invincible Coffee charity initiative, under which ₴2 (€0,05) from each cup of coffee, tea, and other hot drinks sold at gas stations will be donated to restore Kherson, Zaporizhzhia, Luhansk, and Donetsk regions. The company's goal is to use the funds raised to rebuild schools, hospitals, and other socially important facilities that were damaged or destroyed by Russia during the military invasion in these regions. As of July 2023, the company has accumulated more than ₴5.5 million (€134 thousand) as part of the Invincible Coffee initiative to rebuild socially important facilities destroyed by Russia, and as of February 2024, more than ₴9.7 million (€238 thousand).
- In May 2024, Amic Ukraine and the Serhiy Prytula Foundation announced the start of their collaboration under the Invincible Coffee charity initiative. As a result of this partnership, shelters in the Kherson region and medical facilities in the Kherson, Zaporizhzhia, and Donetsk regions were equipped. As of October 2024, Amic Ukraine had transferred ₴12,412,076 (€273 thousand) to the Prytula Foundation to support these three regions. In November 2024, the Invincible Coffee initiative was relaunched in a new format aimed at supporting Ukraine’s Defense and Security Forces.

=== Supporting refugees ===
- Following the 2022 Russian invasion of Ukraine, Amic Polska refueled humanitarian vehicles and buses with refugees at its gas stations free of charge and supplied fuel to the Caritas charity organization, which transported humanitarian aid to the Poland–Ukraine border on a daily basis. The company also provided necessities for refugees free of charge. The Polish company has launched a program for the Drivers' Club members who possess the appropriate Amic Polska card, wherein they could choose to convert the loyalty program points they have accumulated into zlotys and donate them to charity funds. The company matched the contributions by doubling them at its own expense.

=== Helping stray animals ===
- In October 2023, Amic Ukraine, in cooperation with the 12 Vartovykh (Note: Official website of the 12 Vartovykh charitable foundation) charity foundation, launched a joint initiative to sterilize and vaccinate stray animals living at gas stations and surrounding areas. The idea behind the project was to provide the necessary medical care and treatment to stray animals across Ukraine.

== Structure and owners ==
Amic Energy Holding GmbH holds 100% of the shares in Amic Energy Management GmbH. As of 2015, Amic Energy Holding GmbH was owned by three Austrian citizens: lawyer Johannes Klezl-Norberg, investor Manfred Kunze, and banker Heinz Sernetz. As of April 2022, the owners of the company were Austrian citizens Günter Maier, Johannes Klezl-Norberg, Andreas Sernetz, and Irish citizen Gillen Philip Andrew. As of 2015, the company's supervisory board was chaired by Wolfgang Ruttenstorfer, the former head of OMV (2002‒2011) and State Secretary of the Federal Ministry of Finance of Austria (1997‒1999).

The structure of Amic Energy Management GmbH includes:

- Amic Electric GmbH (Austria);
- SIA Amic Latvia (Latvia);
- UAB Amic Lietuva (Lithuania);
- Amic Polska sp. z o.o. (Poland);
- Amic Ukraine CFI (Ukraine).

== Fuel ==
=== Supply sources ===
As of 2016, Amic Ukraine purchased fuel from Belarus, Latvia, Lithuania, Poland, and Russia. According to the company, from 2017‒2018, Amic Ukraine was among the market leaders in diversifying its sources of supply towards European countries and actively worked with the Kremenchuk (Ukraine) and Mozyr (Belarus) oil refineries. Based on the 2021 results, Amic Ukraine was among the top 5 suppliers of Lithuanian petroleum products to Ukraine (according to the A-95 consulting group). As of 2022, the company obtained approximately 30% of its fuel from the Mažeikiai refinery of the Polish group Orlen. Amic Polska exclusively sells Orlen fuel.

In March 2023, the general director of Amic Ukraine announced that starting in April 2023, the company planned to source fuel from the Austrian concern OMV. In 2024, the main sources of fuel supply for Amic Ukraine were: Orlen Lietuva (Lithuania) — 39.07% of gasoline and 31.27% of diesel fuel; OMV Petrom (Romania) — 60.86% of gasoline and 2.31% of diesel; and Unimot (Poland) — 0.08% of gasoline and 66.42% of diesel fuel. In April 2025, Amic Ukraine began importing bioethanol-blended gasoline from Orlen Lietuva and OMV Petrom.

=== Fuel quality ===
According to inspections by the Institute of Consumer Expertise (Ukraine) in 2024 and 2025, Amic Energy’s A-95 gasoline was rated in the “green zone,” meeting the Euro 5 standard and showing a high octane rating (95.7–96.6, with a minimum requirement of 95), low sulfur content (5–6 mg/kg, with a maximum allowed of 10 mg/kg), and low benzene content (0.2–0.64%, with a maximum allowed of 1%).

The network’s diesel fuel, based on inspections in 2023 and 2024, also met the Euro 5 standard and demonstrated a high flash point (69–70 °C, with a minimum requirement of 55 °C), low sulfur content (3–6 mg/kg, with a maximum allowed of 10 mg/kg), and suitability for winter conditions.

== Financial indicators ==
According to the 2020 results, Amic Ukraine achieved a turnover of ₴7.37 billion (€210.5 million) with a loss of ₴1.7 billion (€48.5 million), ranking 80th among the largest private companies in Ukraine (according to Forbes.ua) and 130th among all top companies in Ukraine (according to Business.Censor.net). Amic Ukraine also ranked 5th among Ukrainian petrol station networks in terms of the amount of taxes paid and 3rd in terms of the calculation of taxes paid per liter of fuel sold (according to the project "Rating. Business in official figures"), and it was the only network in the top 10 with a single legal entity.

In September 2022, Danylo Hetmantsev, the chairman of the Tax Committee of the Verkhovna Rada, highlighted Amic Ukraine among the companies that increased the tax burden during the war. Based on the 2022 results, Amic Ukraine generated a turnover of ₴8.5 billion (€214.5 million) but incurred a loss of ₴3.5 billion (€88.3 million), placing it in 129th position among the largest companies in Ukraine (according to Business.Censor.net). Based on research from the energy publication Enkorr, in 2023, Amic Energy ranked third among Ukrainian fuel station networks in the transparency of personal income tax (PIT) payments and was in the top 3 for the tax burden per liter of fuel. In 2023, Amic Ukraine paid ₴1.5 billion (€33.8 million) in taxes, and in 2024 — ₴2.5 billion (€56.4 million). At the beginning of 2025, the head of the Verkhovna Rada Tax Committee, Danylo Hetmantsev, recognized Amic Energy with a letter of appreciation for being a diligent taxpayer based on its 2024 performance.

== Controversies ==
=== Allegations of fictitious sale ===
Following the announcement of the agreement to sell Lukoil-Ukraine CFI to Amic Energy in 2014, some commentators suggested that the real owner of the network in fact remained Lukoil, which was doing so to protect its Ukrainian assets from possible sanctions. The media also drew attention to the fact that the Amic Energy company was only registered in Austria in 2013 and that Amic Energy's authorized capital at the time of its foundation was only €35,000, which journalists believed could indicate that it was a shell company. In response to these allegations, Günter Maier, CEO of Amic Energy, stated at a press conference in Kyiv in September 2014 that the purchase was not fictitious and was not being carried out in the interests of Lukoil or Lukoil shareholders: "I can confirm that the assets are being acquired only in the interests of three Amic shareholders and at their own expense."

Similarly, following Amic Energy's 2016 acquisition of the Lukoil petrol station network in Latvia, Lithuania, and Poland, the Polish newspaper Puls Biznesu claimed that "the same Lukoil is hiding under the new brand, which thus wants to circumvent the boycott of European consumers who do not want to buy petrol from the Russians". In February 2022, Amic Polska declared that its "network of 116 Polish Amic Energy petrol stations is not linked by capital to the Lukoil company or other business organizations of the Russian Federation". In response to similar concerns in Lithuania, in March 2016 UAB Amic Lietuva submitted the conclusion by the Republic of Lithuania's Commission for assessment of conformity of potential participants to national security interests, which certified that Amic Energy complies with the interests of Lithuania's national security.

=== Accusations of ESBU ===
In August 2022, the Economic Security Bureau of Ukraine (ESBU) announced the initiation of the seizure of 308 assets of the Amic Ukraine CFI network, totaling over ₴50 million (€1.3 million) in corporate rights. In particular, the ESBU accused the company of tax evasion and maintaining links with Russia. Amic Energy responded by calling both accusations "unfounded and baseless" and claimed that ESBU's actions were evidence of "deliberate illegal pressure on a foreign investor".

Günter Maier, the ultimate beneficial owner and managing director of Amic Energy, denied all allegations against the company at a press conference in Kyiv in September 2022. He announced that Amic Ukraine had appealed to the Court of Appeal to overturn the decision on the seizure of assets in Ukraine and would defend its rights at the national level and turn to international institutions if necessary. The Austrian Ambassador to Ukraine, Arad Benkö, called on the Ukrainian authorities to take proportionate measures that do not hinder business as long as no guilt is proven and stated that the Austrian embassy would closely follow the investigation.

In May 2023, the preliminary report of the temporary investigative commission of the Verkhovna Rada (Ukraine's national parliament), following the review of a number of complaints, including from Amic Ukraine, stated possible violations by ESBU, including violation of the presumption of innocence in public comments. Despite the investigation, in February 2023, Amic Ukraine CFI won the Economic Security Bureau of Ukraine’s tenders for the supply of diesel fuel and motor gasoline, resulting in corresponding contracts being signed and fulfilled between Amic Ukraine and the ESBU. In 2024, the ESBU territorial offices in Kyiv and the Kyiv region also recognized Amic Ukraine as the winner of its fuel supply tenders.

As of April 2025, a pre-trial investigation was ongoing in the ESBU case against Amic Ukraine, and a temporary seizure of the company’s assets remained in effect. According to Amic Energy’s shareholders, in 2023 Amic Ukraine underwent a documentary tax audit, which found none of the violations alleged by the ESBU. The company stated that it had already proven its non-involvement in two of the four charges and expected the case to be fully closed.

== Links ==
- Official website of Amic Energy GmbH
- Official website of Amic Energy in Poland
- Official website of Amic Energy in Ukraine
