= Azpetrol =

Azerbaijani oil and gas company

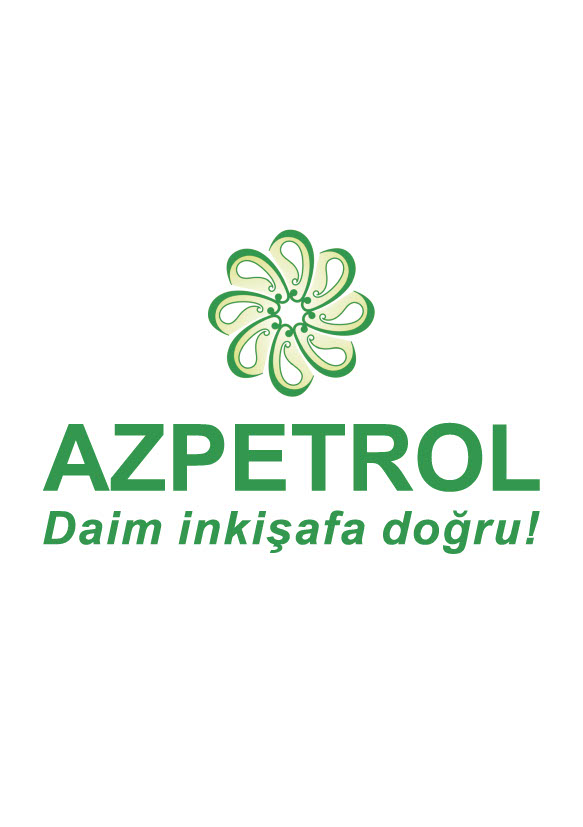
- Type: Private
- Industry: Oil and gas
- Founded: 1997
- Headquarters: Baku, Azerbaijan
- Area served: Azerbaijan
- Key people: Jeyhun Mammadov
- Products: Fuels
- Services: Retail sale Wholesale
- Number of employees: More than 3400
- Website: azpetrol.az

Azpetrol Ltd. LLC is an Azerbaijani oil and gas company, with 107 filling stations in the country.

== Overview ==
The principal activity of Azpetrol, which opened its first filling station in July 1997 in Baku, is the retail and wholesale of fuel through its petrol and gas stations network.

The company has 107 gasoline stations, 2 liquid gas (propane-butane) stations, 1 compressed natural gas (CNG) terminal that meets most modern standards in the republic serving passenger transportation in public transport, and 3 oil depots for storing fuel products in most economic zones of our country. There is an Autobaza for fuel trucks, 110 fuel trucks, and an Autoyard for passenger cars to ensure uninterrupted transportation of fuel to gas stations. There are 4 compressed natural gas stations, 3 liquefied gas stations and 20 electric car charging stations, 8 motels, as well as catering facilities (cafe, car wash, market) in most stations for the provision of various services. . Azpetrol is one of the largest employers in the country, with more than 3400 staff. The general director is Mammadov Jeyhun, and the first deputy is Ali Karimli.

== Awards ==
- In April 2013 Azpetrol was presented the prize in the nomination "The leader of its field" by "UGUR" National Award.
- In April 2013 Azpetrol was awarded "International Quality Crown" in the category of excellence in its services by B.I.D International Quality Convention. The former general director Huseynaga Rahimov was presented the award of "Entrepreneur of the Year".
- In March 2013 Azpetrol won the award in the category "Fuel Brand of the Year" in the awarding ceremony «Brand of Azerbaijan».
