= Olerex =

Company based in Estonia

- Company type: Fuel station
- Number of locations: 87
- Area served: Estonia
- Owner: Olerex AS
- Website: www.olerex.ee

AS Olerex is a wholesaler and retailer of automotive fuels in Estonia. Their most important gasoline provider is Mažeikių Nafta in Lithuania. Diesel and light fuel oil is mainly mineral and acquired from Kinef, Mozõr and JSC Naftan.

== History ==
AS Olerex opened their first gas station in 1994. Today their branch is importing gasoline and lubricant and serving customers through gas station and wholesale trademarkets.

As of the end of 2018, the company owned 95 gas stations in Estonia and employed over 650 people there. The turnover of the company in the same year was 384.1 million euros, with a profit of 2.3 million euros.

In 2019, the company also acquires an oil terminal in the port of Muuga.

== See also ==
- Energy in Estonia
