= Esso =

Oil and gas brand controlled by ExxonMobil

- Current logo, which is a revision of 1934 logo, used since 1965.
- Product type: Gasoline, lubricants
- Current owner: ExxonMobil (1999–present)
- Produced by: ExxonMobil; Imperial Oil (Canada)
- Country: United States
- Introduced: 1911; 115 years ago
- Discontinued: 1977; 49 years ago (United States)
- Related brands: Mobil
- Markets: Worldwide
- Website: esso.com

Esso (/ˈɛsoʊ/) is a global trading name for ExxonMobil, used alongside Mobil, as one of its two primary retail brands outside the United States.

The name was originally used by its predecessor, Standard Oil of New Jersey, which began marketing products under the Esso brand in 1926 following the 1911 breakup of the original Standard Oil company. The name was derived from the phonetic pronunciation of the parent company's initials (S.O.).

Following the acquisition of Humble Oil, the Esso name was largely replaced within the U.S. by the Exxon brand in 1972. Today the Exxon brand is used only for the United States market, while the Esso trademark remains widely used across Europe, Canada, Asia, and Latin America.

== History ==
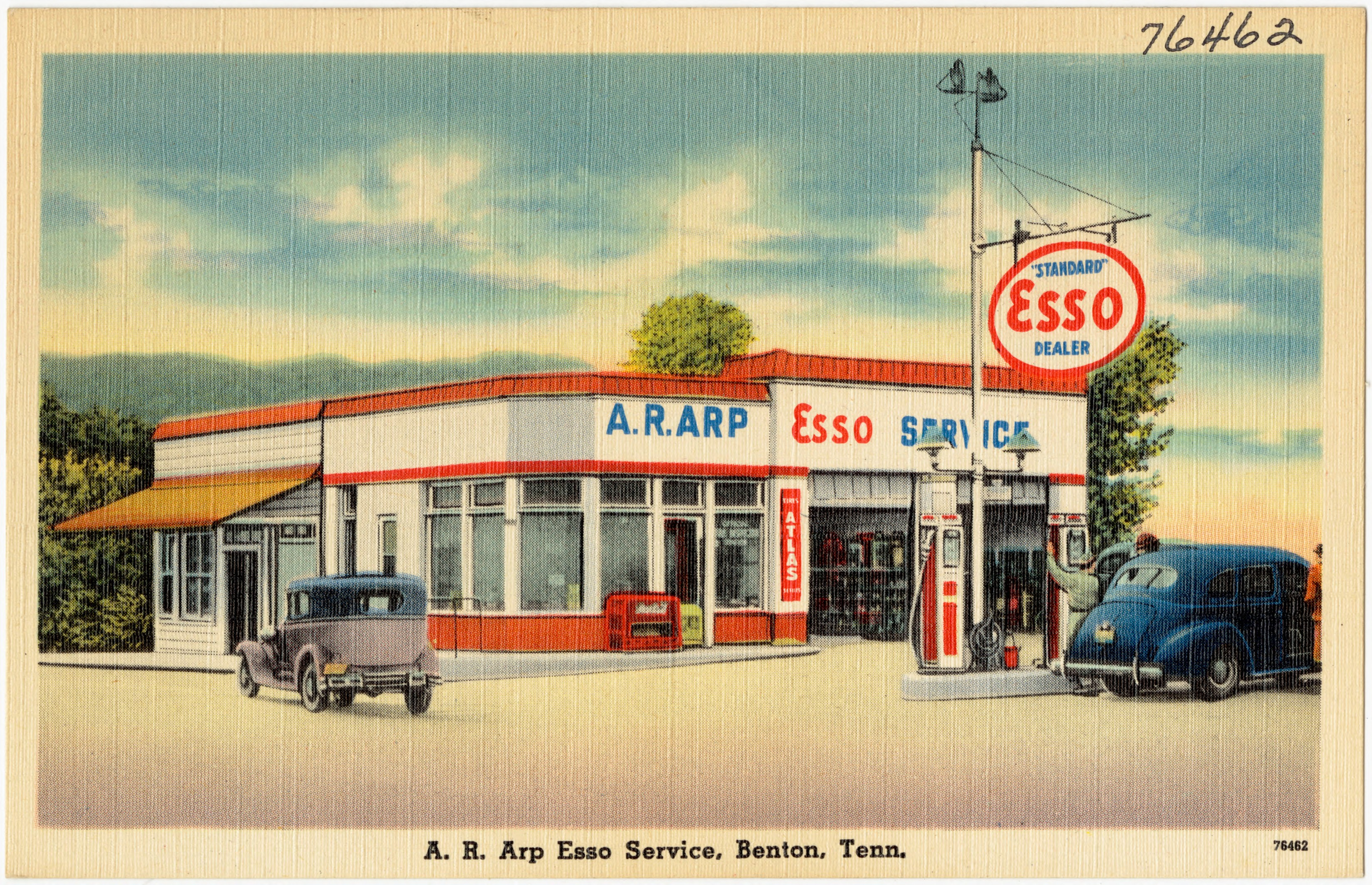
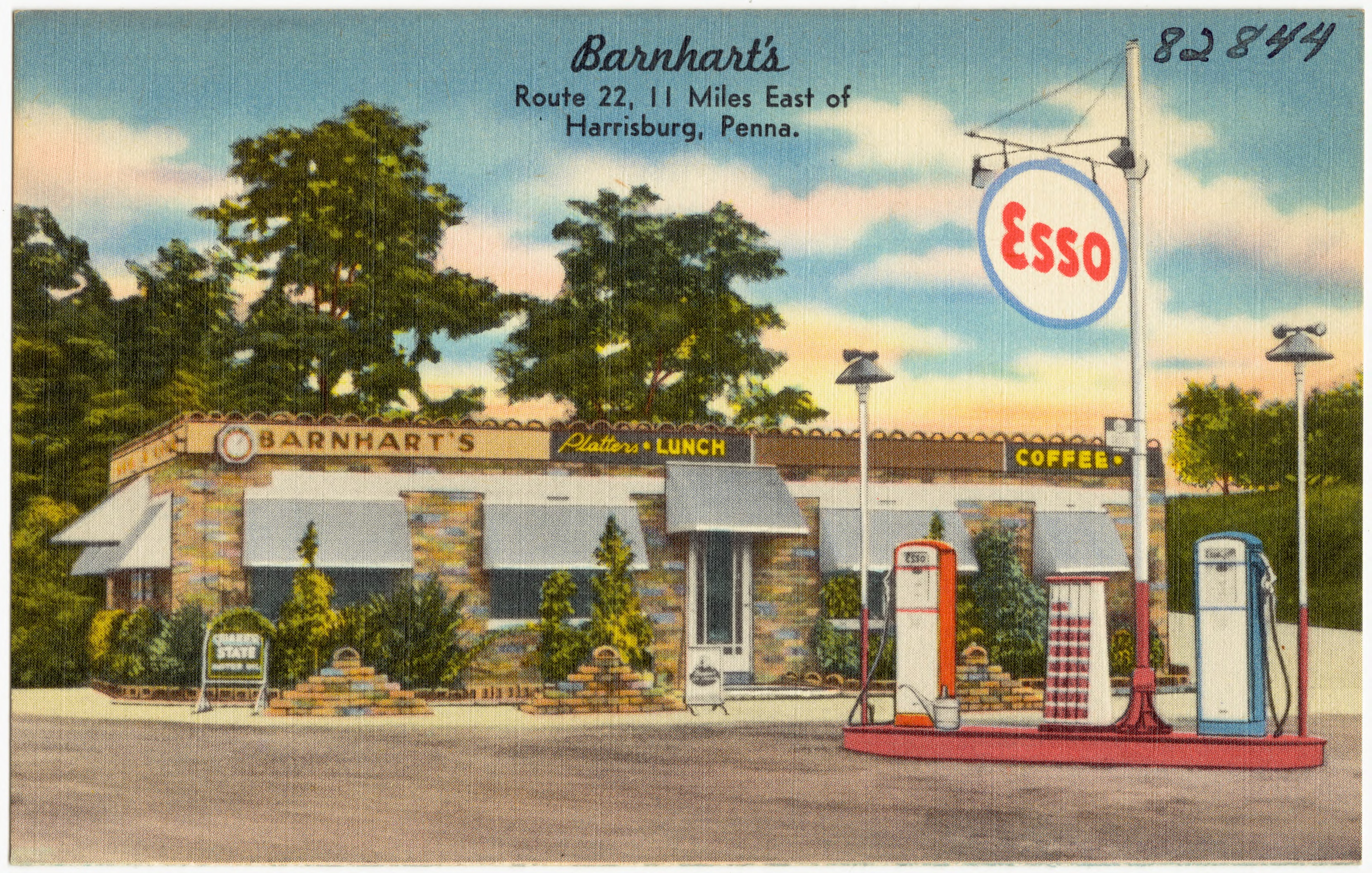
Postcards depicting Esso gas stations in Tennessee (left) and Pennsylvania (right)

In 1911, Standard Oil was broken up into 34 companies, some of which were named Standard Oil and had the rights to that brand in certain states (the other companies had no territorial rights). The name Esso is the phonetic pronunciation of the initials 'S' and 'O' in the name Standard Oil. Standard Oil Company (New Jersey; "Jersey Standard") had the rights in that state, plus in Maryland, West Virginia, Virginia, North Carolina, South Carolina, and the District of Columbia. By 1941, it had also acquired the rights in Pennsylvania, Delaware, Arkansas, Tennessee, and Louisiana.

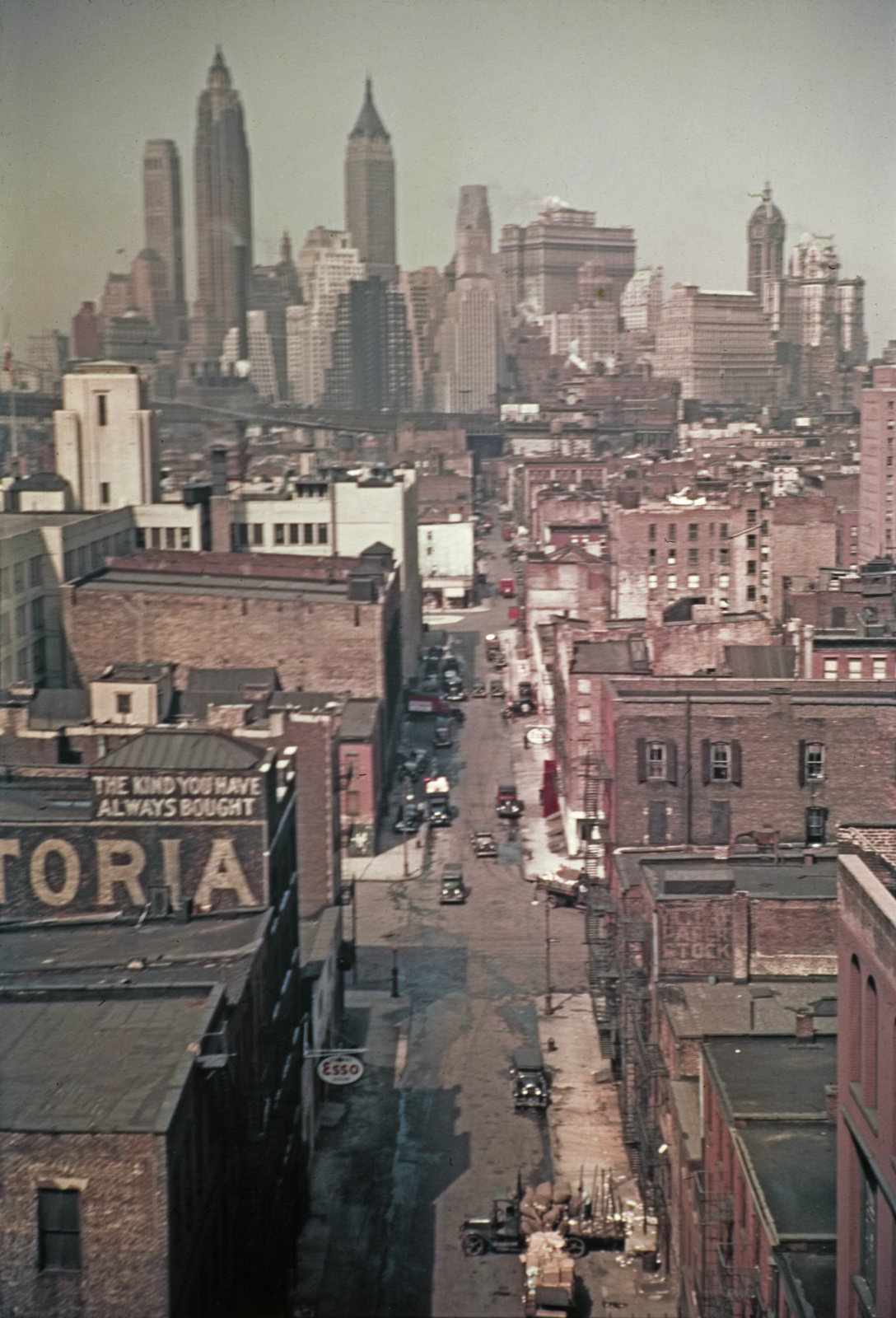
Esso enamel steel sign in Manhattan, New York City, photographed in 1938

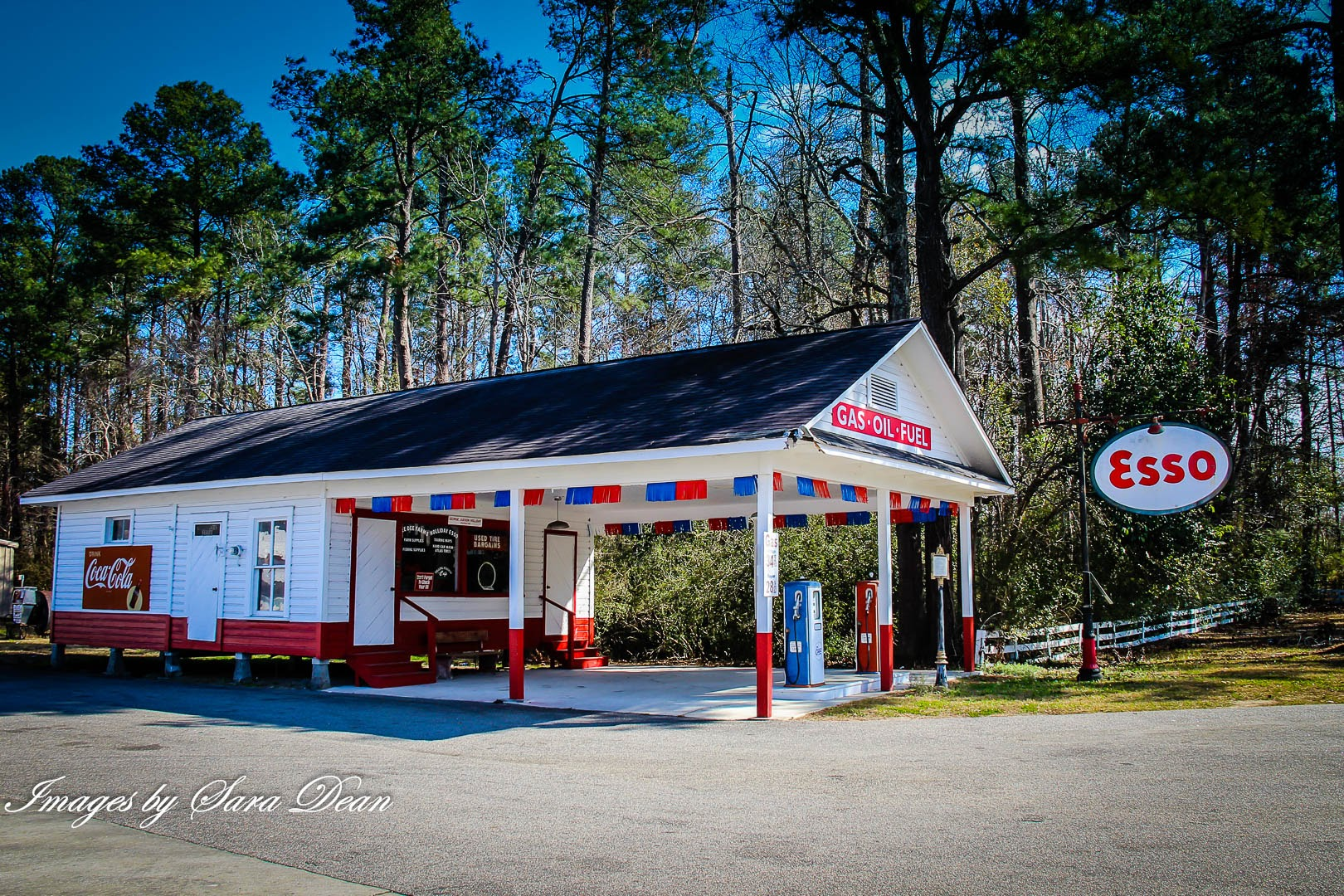
Historic Esso station in South Carolina, pictured in 2017

It also used the Esso brand in New York and the six New England states, where the Standard Oil Company of New York (Socony-Vacuum, later Socony Mobil) had the rights, but did not object to the New Jersey company's use of the trademark (the two companies did not merge until November 1999). However, in the other states, the other Standard Oil companies objected and, via a 1937 U.S. federal court injunction, forced Jersey Standard to use other brand names. In most states the company used the Enco ("Energy Company") brand name, and in a few, the Humble brand name. The objections were mostly made by Standard Oil of Ohio and, in the 1960s, Standard Oil of California (now Chevron Corporation) after their acquisition of former Esso jobber Standard Oil of Kentucky. The other major Standard Oil spinoff, Standard Oil of Indiana (which became Amoco) largely did not object due to the Midwestern United States being a weaker market for Esso. Likewise, The Ohio Oil Company, a Standard Oil of New Jersey property from 1889 until divested in 1911, which eventually became Marathon Oil, did not market its downstream assets under the Standard name due to Sohio and Amoco owning the rights to the name in its core Midwestern territory.

The other Standard companies likewise were "Standard" or some variant on that name in their home states, and another brand name in other states. Esso ranked 31st among American corporations in the value of World War II production contracts.

During the years of racial segregation in the United States, Esso franchises gave out The Negro Motorist Green Book: An International Travel Guide.

In 1973, Standard Oil of New Jersey renamed itself Exxon Corporation, and adopted the Exxon brand name throughout the country. It maintained the trademark rights to the Standard and Esso brands in the states where it held those rights by selling Esso Diesel in those states at stations that sell diesel fuel, thus preventing the trademark from being declared abandoned.

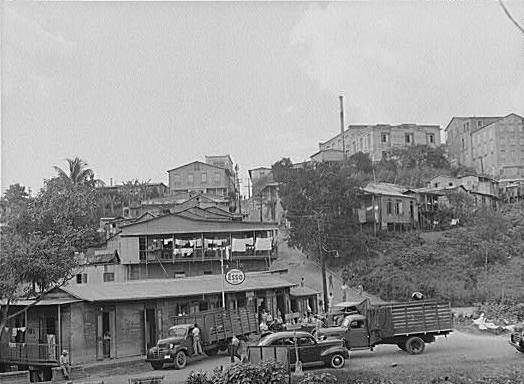
Esso gas station in Lares, Puerto Rico, 1942. The Esso brand name remained there until 2008.

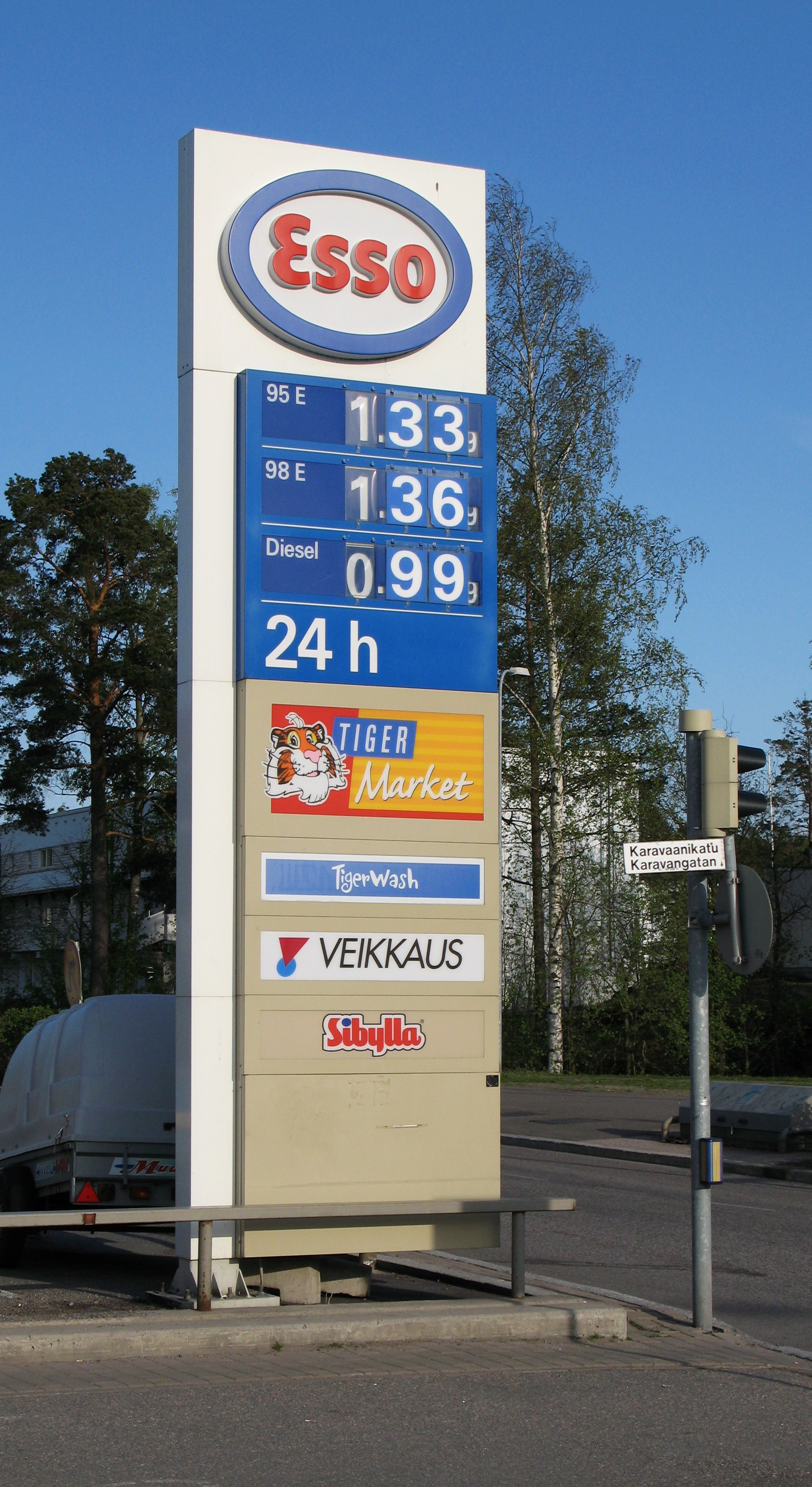
Esso price bar in Finland

It retained the Esso brand in Puerto Rico and the United States Virgin Islands until 2008, when it sold its stations there to TotalEnergies.

The Enco brand name was used on locations in the Midwest until 1977, when they were sold to Cheker Oil Co. (now part of 7-Eleven); Exxon continues to have a presence in southern Ohio today (as it does throughout much of Appalachia in general), though Mobil is the company's primary brand in the Midwest.

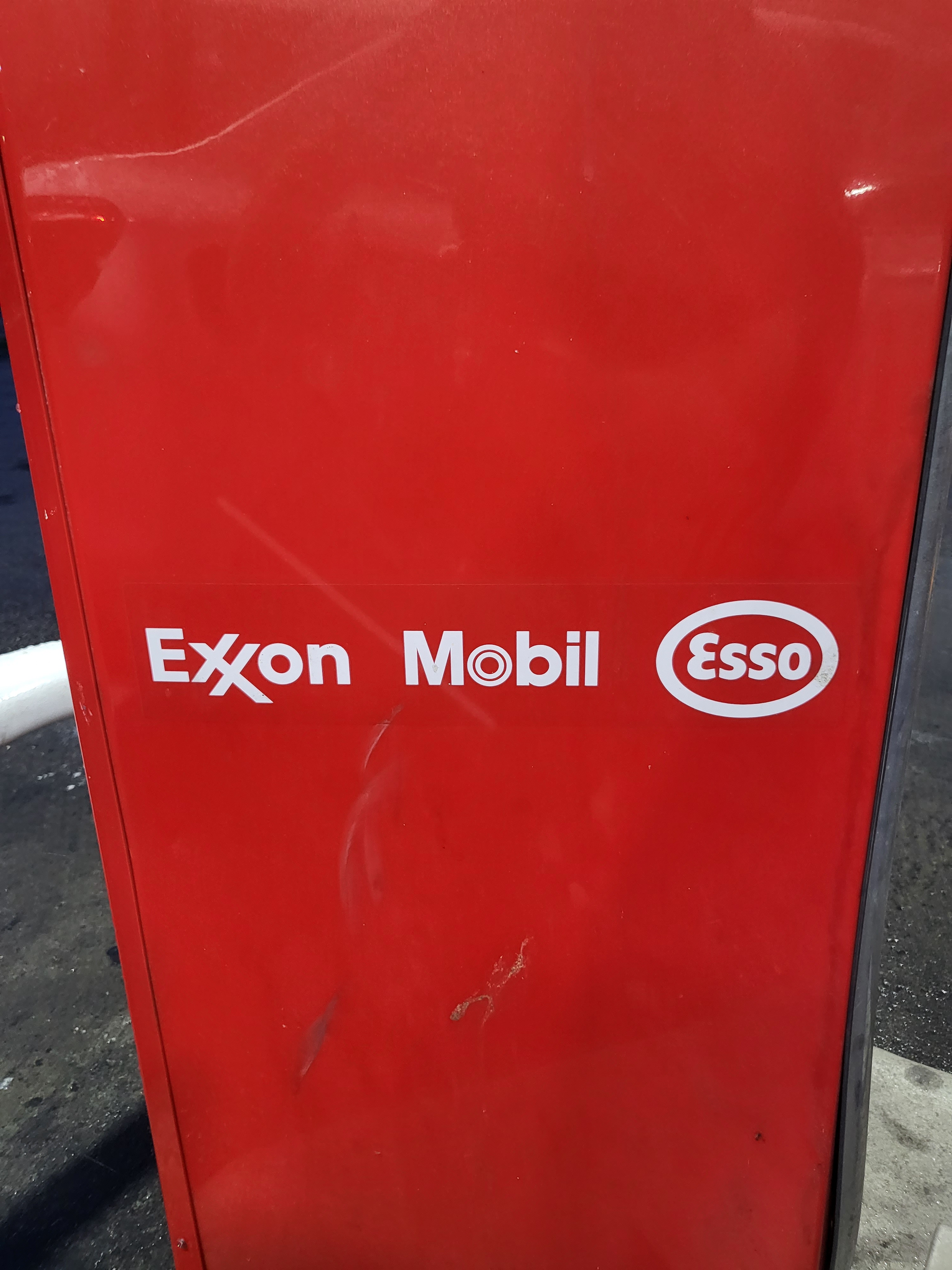
Station signage at an Exxon station in Columbus, Ohio, featuring the Esso logo, while BP owns the rights to the Standard Oil name in Ohio

In February 2016, ExxonMobil successfully asked a U.S. federal court to lift the 1930s trademark injunction that banned it from using the Esso brand in some states. By this time, as a result of numerous mergers and rebranding, most of the remaining Standard Oil companies that had objected to the Esso name had been acquired by BP. ExxonMobil cited trademark surveys in which there was no longer possible confusion with the Esso name as it was more than seven decades before. Neither BP nor Chevron (which had minimized the use of the Standard name in the 1970s) had any objection to lifting the ban.

ExxonMobil did not specify whether they would now open new stations in the U.S. under the Esso name; they were primarily concerned about the additional expenses of having separate marketing, letterheads, packaging, and other materials that omit Esso. The Esso name did return to minor station signage at both Exxon and Mobil stations, which also had the effect of ExxonMobil de facto claiming the Standard trademark in Colorado, Kentucky, Montana, North Dakota, Oklahoma and Wyoming as Chevron withdrew from Kentucky in 2010 and BP gradually withdrew sales from the other states.

== United Kingdom ==
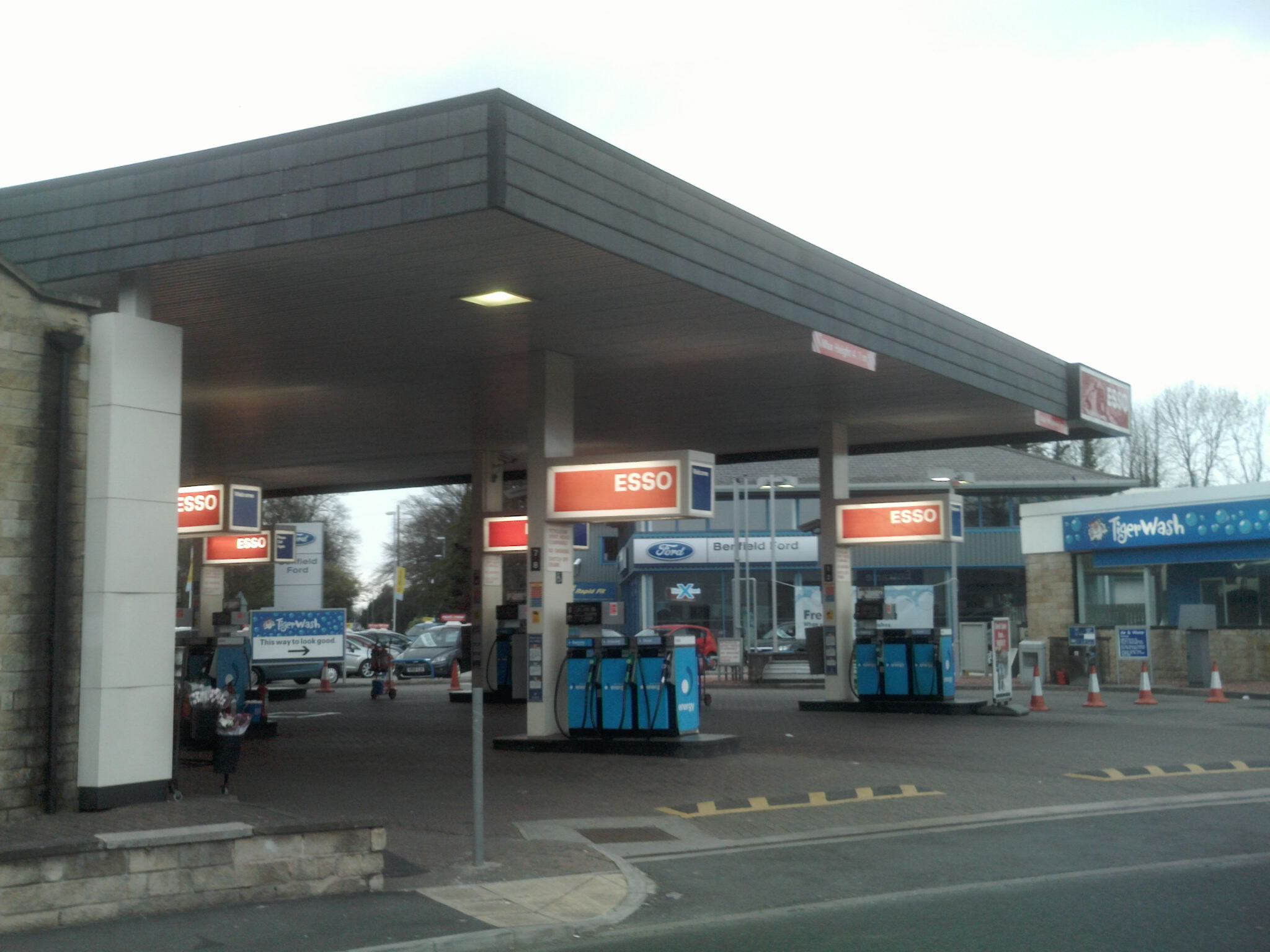
An Esso service station in Wetherby, West Yorkshire, England (2010)

In 1888, the Anglo American Oil Company opened its head office in London, which eventually became a part of Esso. In August 1998, Tesco announced a partnership with Esso, opening chains of Tesco Express stores located within forecourts, which continues today. In February 2000, the two companies were opening one new store a month, creating 4,000 jobs.

=== Esso Blue ===
Esso Blue was the brand name of Esso's paraffin oil (kerosene) for domestic heaters in countries such as the United Kingdom. Their television advertising slogan, from the 1950s through to the 1970s, was the famous "Bom, Bom, Bom, Bom, Esso Blue!" The TV ads. featured 'Joe', a bowler-hatted, animated salesman. Joe, a humble, tongue-tied dealer trying to promote Esso Blue, famously stumbled over his words and introduced himself by mistakenly saying, "Hello, I'm the Esso Blee Dooler," instead of Esso Blue Dealer. This deliberate 'Spoonerism' was a runaway success, and firmly imprinted the brand in the public consciousness.

One campaign used the well-known song tune of "Smoke Gets in Your Eyes" reworded as: "They asked me how I knew, it was Esso Blue, I of course replied, with lower grades one buys, smoke gets in your eyes. The non-smoking paraffin". The track was released as a flexi disk which was given away free in hardware stores.

=== Cleveland ===
In the 1930s, Esso acquired Cleveland, an independent company based in North East England. Its founder and principal shareholder, Norman Davis, had spent some of World War I with his brother Manuel in Cleveland, Ohio. Cleveland's products included a benzole blend and an alcohol blend called "Discol". The Esso and Cleveland names continued in use until 1973, when the Cleveland filling stations were re-branded as Esso.

=== Northern Ireland ===
Esso traded in Northern Ireland up until the early 2000s. Their forecourts were re-branded as Maxol and Texaco and some remained private.

=== Euro Garages ===
45 of Euro Garages' forecourts were bought from Esso in 2013, and are operated under the Esso brand. They plan to roll out partner brands such as Starbucks and Spar, replacing the Esso branded shops.

=== Esso ROC / On the Run / Snack and Shop ===
ROC used self-branded stores under the "Snack and Shop" and "On the Run" branding depending on the size and the larger sites featured a Costa Cafe. ROC was the name for Esso's self-operated forecourts.

By 2015, ROC UK had sold all their sites to operators such as Rontec and Euro Garages, leaving no forecourts directly operated by Esso in the UK.

== Affiliates ==
=== Australia ===
In Australia, Esso is an affiliate of ExxonMobil; it operates oil and gas production. Its retail petrol stations were acquired by Mobil Australia in 1990.

=== Canada ===
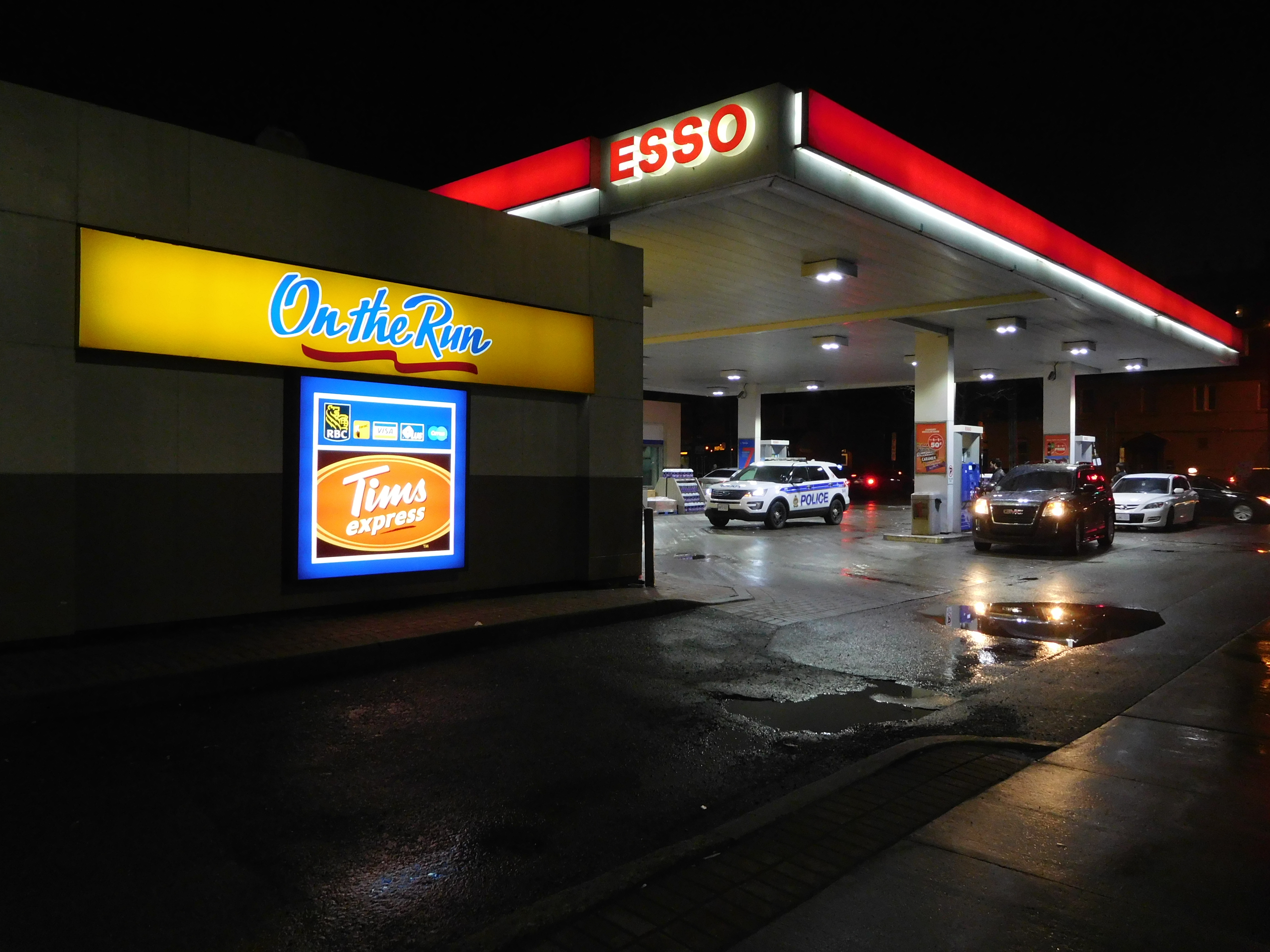
An Esso location in Ottawa, Ontario, with an On The Run convenience store, 2017

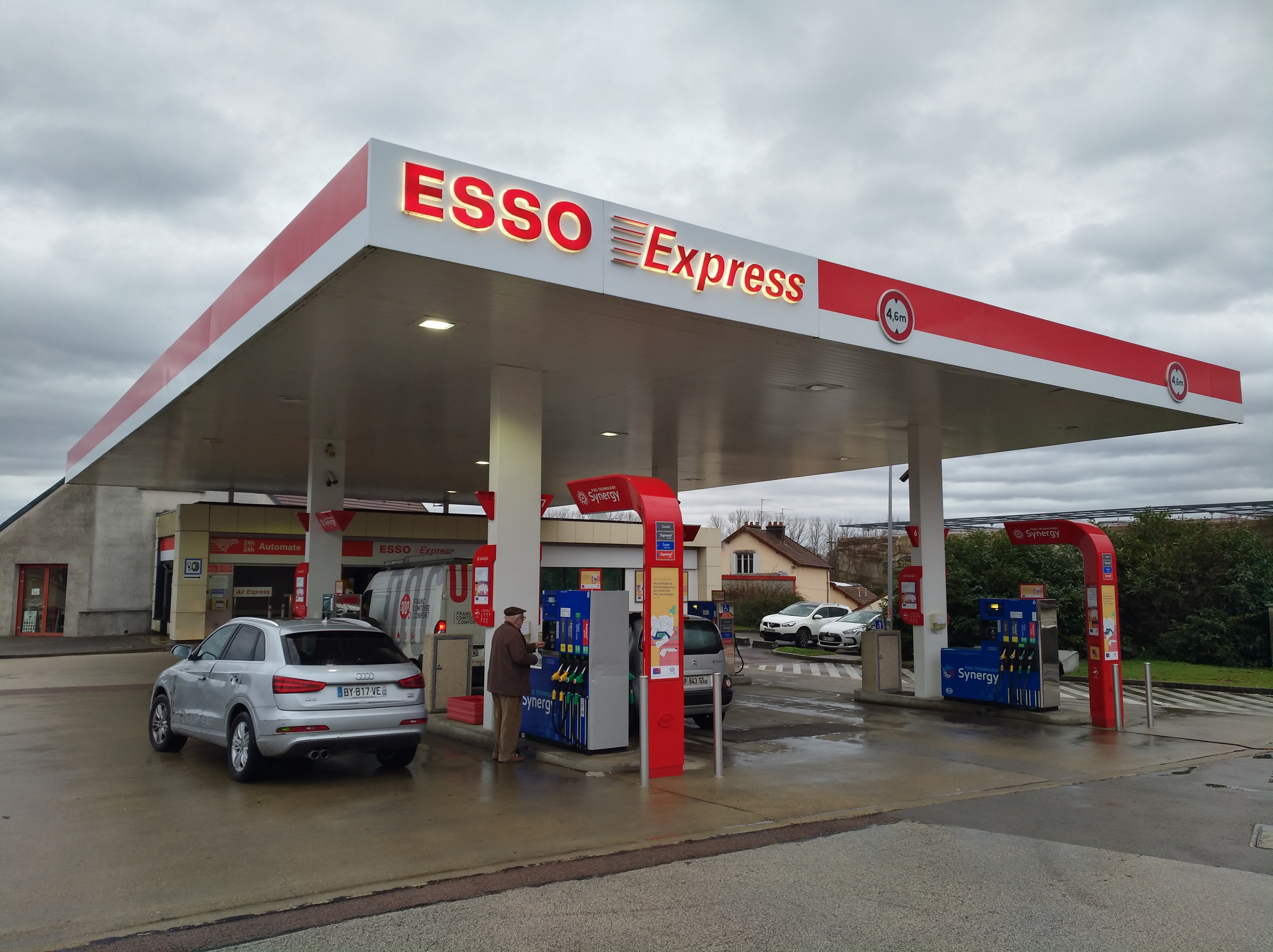
Esso Express station in Dole, France, 2018

In Canada, the Esso brand is used on stations supplied by Imperial Oil, which is 69.8% owned by ExxonMobil. The stations are owned by third-party retailers such as:

- Couche-Tard (mostly Ontario and Quebec, with stores primarily operating under the Circle K, Couche-Tard and Mac's brands),
- 7-Eleven (mostly Alberta and British Columbia),
- Parkland Fuel,
- Harnois Groupe pétrolier (mostly in Quebec, with a few stations in Ontario, and one each in Alberta, New Brunswick and Nova Scotia as of August 2023),
- Husky Energy (which were sold to Parkland Fuel and Federated Co-operatives ("Co-op") in 2022), and
- Wilson Fuel in Nova Scotia and Newfoundland (which were sold to Couche-Tard in 2021).

Imperial Oil began to sell the majority of its company-owned stations in 2016.

Esso also provides aviation fuel services at 80 airport locations in Canada (Aviation and Avitat).

=== Caribbean ===
Esso has sold most of its assets in the Caribbean. In 2008 it sold its retail operations in Puerto Rico, the United States Virgin Islands and Jamaica to TotalEnergies. Those were converted to the Total brand. In 2014, Sol Petroleum purchased Esso operations in The Bahamas, Barbados, Bermuda, Cayman Islands, Dominican Republic, Guadeloupe and Martinique. Rights to continue to operate in those countries under the Esso name were included.

=== France ===
Esso S.A.F. is the French subsidiary of ExxonMobil, operating several hundred filling stations and two refineries in France. In 2025, ESSO S.A.F was sold to North Atlantic and became North Atlantic Energies.

=== Japan ===
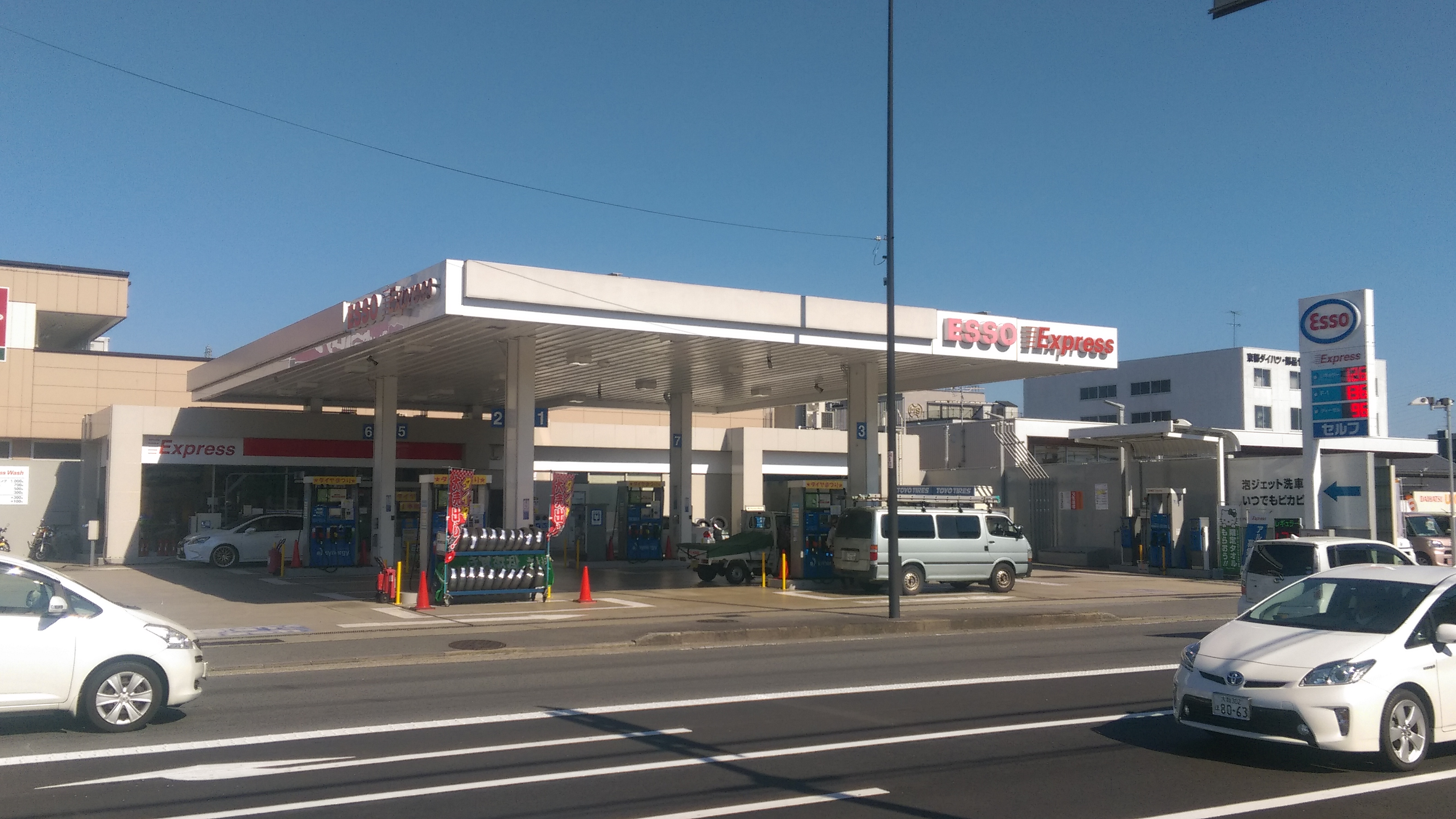
Esso Express in Kyoto, Japan, 2017

Established as Esso Standard Sekiyu K.K. in 1962, following the dissolution of the Standard Vacuum Oil Company. It became Esso Sekiyu K.K. in 1982. After the Exxon and Mobil merger in 1999, the Japanese subsidiaries were reorganized as ExxonMobil Y.K. in 2002, which spun off its downstream business to EMG Marketing G.K. in 2012, and acquired as a subsidiary by TonenGeneral Sekiyu K.K. in the same year. In 2016, JX Holdings and the TonenGeneral Group merged into JXTG Holdings (now Eneos Holdings), leading to the dissolution and absorption of EMG Marketing into a subsidiary of the new company, JXTG Nippon Oil & Energy (now Eneos), in 2017. In 2019, the company began to phase out the Esso and Mobil brands in Japan, replacing it with JX's Eneos EneJet banner.

=== South America ===
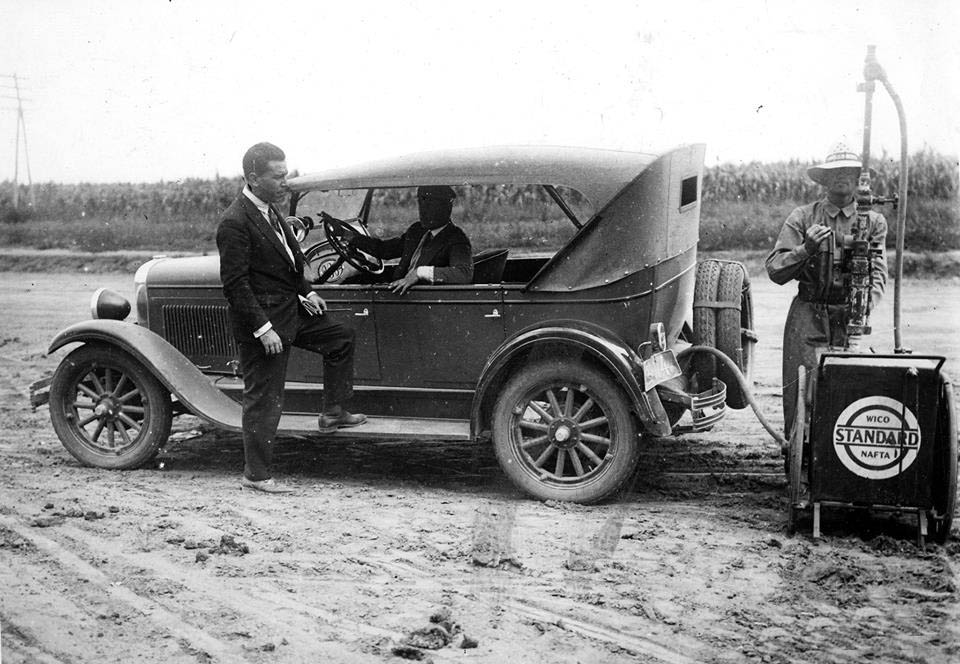
WICO standard petrol pump, c. 1928

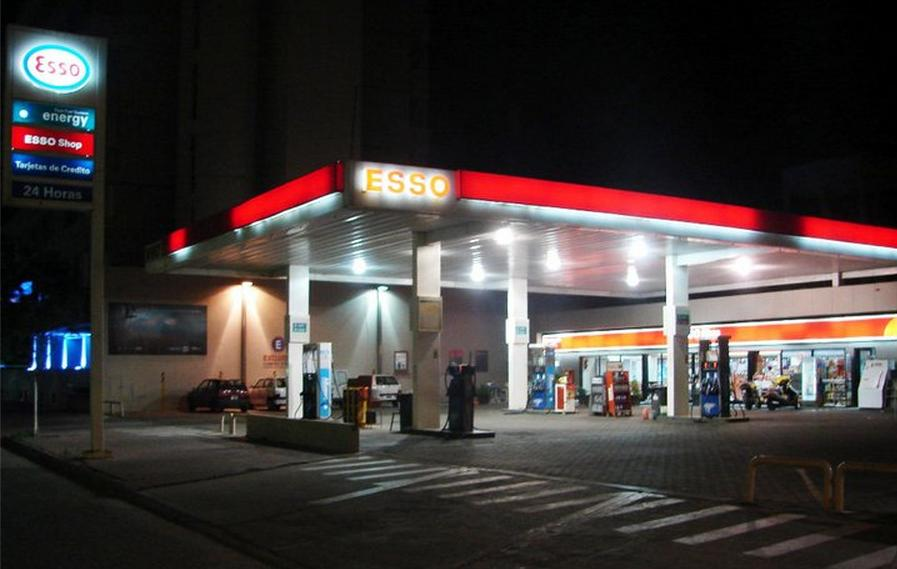
Petrol station in Rafaela, 2014

Standard Oil of New Jersey started business in Argentina in 1911, acquiring the "Compañía Nacional de Aceites" (National Company of Oil), which had been founded in 1906 by entrepreneur Emilio Schiffner in Campana, Buenos Aires to produce kerosene. It became the first oil refinery in Latin America, doing business as "Compañía Nativa de Petróleo". Soon after, it merged with another foreign company operating in Argentina, West India Oil Co. (mostly known as "WICO").

The first petrol pump was placed in the Plaza del Congreso of Buenos Aires, while the first service station opened in 1927 in the city of Santa Fe. The company opened other refineries in Neuquén and Jujuy provinces. The company also introduced its motor oil line, Essolube in 1936. By 1943, Esso produced the 60% of petroleum in Argentina.

In 2011, local consortium Bridas Corporation (formed by Bridas Energy Holdings Limited and Chinese CNOOC International Limited) acquired rights to the Esso brand in Argentina, Paraguay and Uruguay. As a result, all the Esso stations were rebranded as "Axion Energy". At the time of the acquisition, Esso had 520 stations (with 450 under franchises), being the third largest producer of Argentine after YPF and Shell, with a 12% market share.

== Branding ==
Esso is ExxonMobil's primary motor fuel brand worldwide except in Australia, Guam, Mexico, Nigeria, and New Zealand, where the Mobil brand is used exclusively. In Canada (since 2017), Colombia, Egypt, and formerly Malaysia (until 2013, when Petron (the former Esso Philippines, until 1973) acquired ExxonMobil's Malaysian operations) and Japan (until 2019), both the Esso and Mobil brands are used. In Hong Kong and Singapore, Mobil brand is applied on Esso fuel tank after Mobil service stations began to merge with Esso between 2003 and 2007.

Mobil is ExxonMobil's primary retail motor fuel brand in California, Florida, New York, New England, the Great Lakes and the Midwest. Exxon is the primary brand in the rest of the United States, with the highest concentration of retail outlets located in New Jersey, Pennsylvania, Texas and in the Mid-Atlantic and Southeastern states.

== Advertising campaigns ==
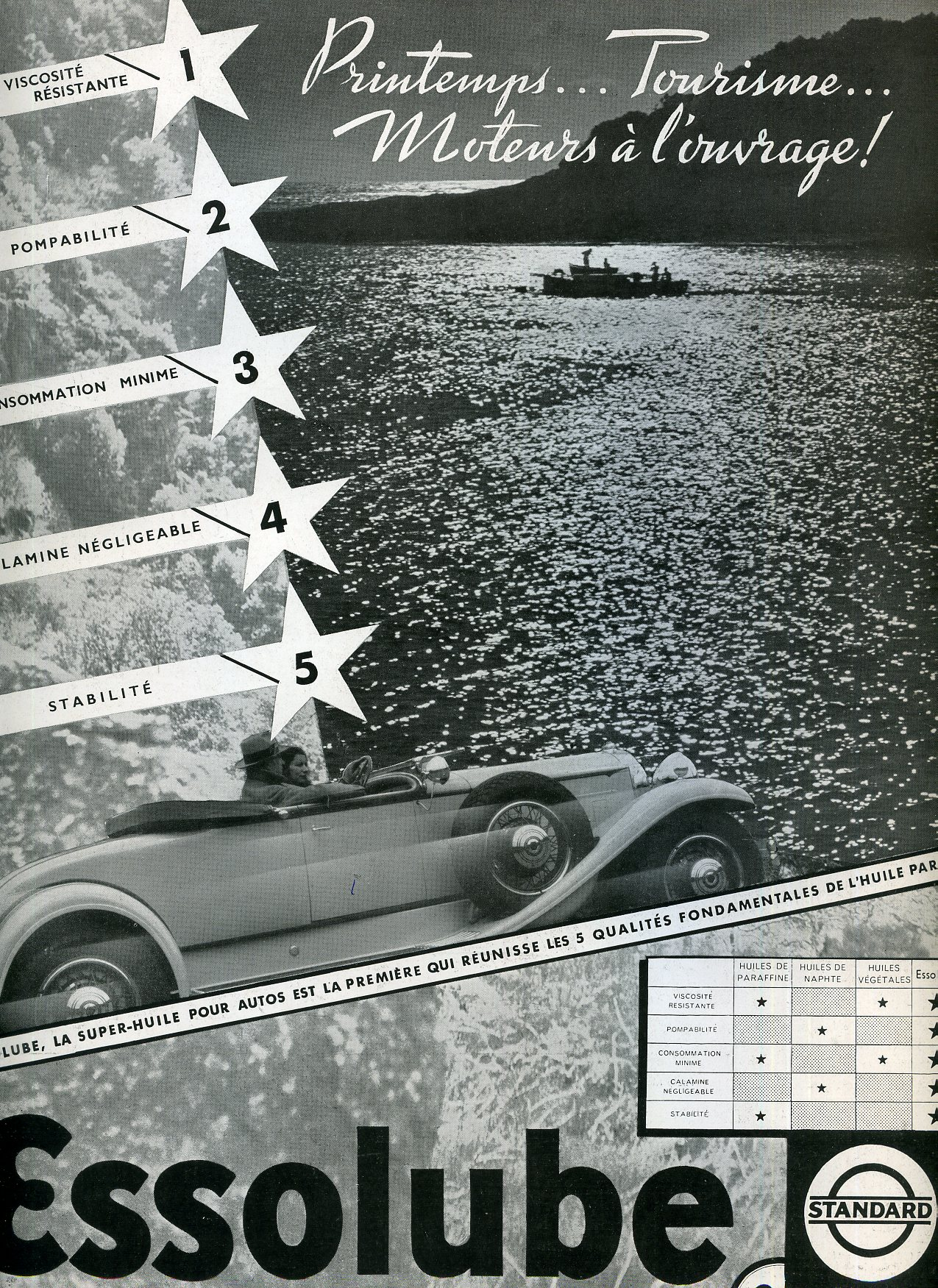
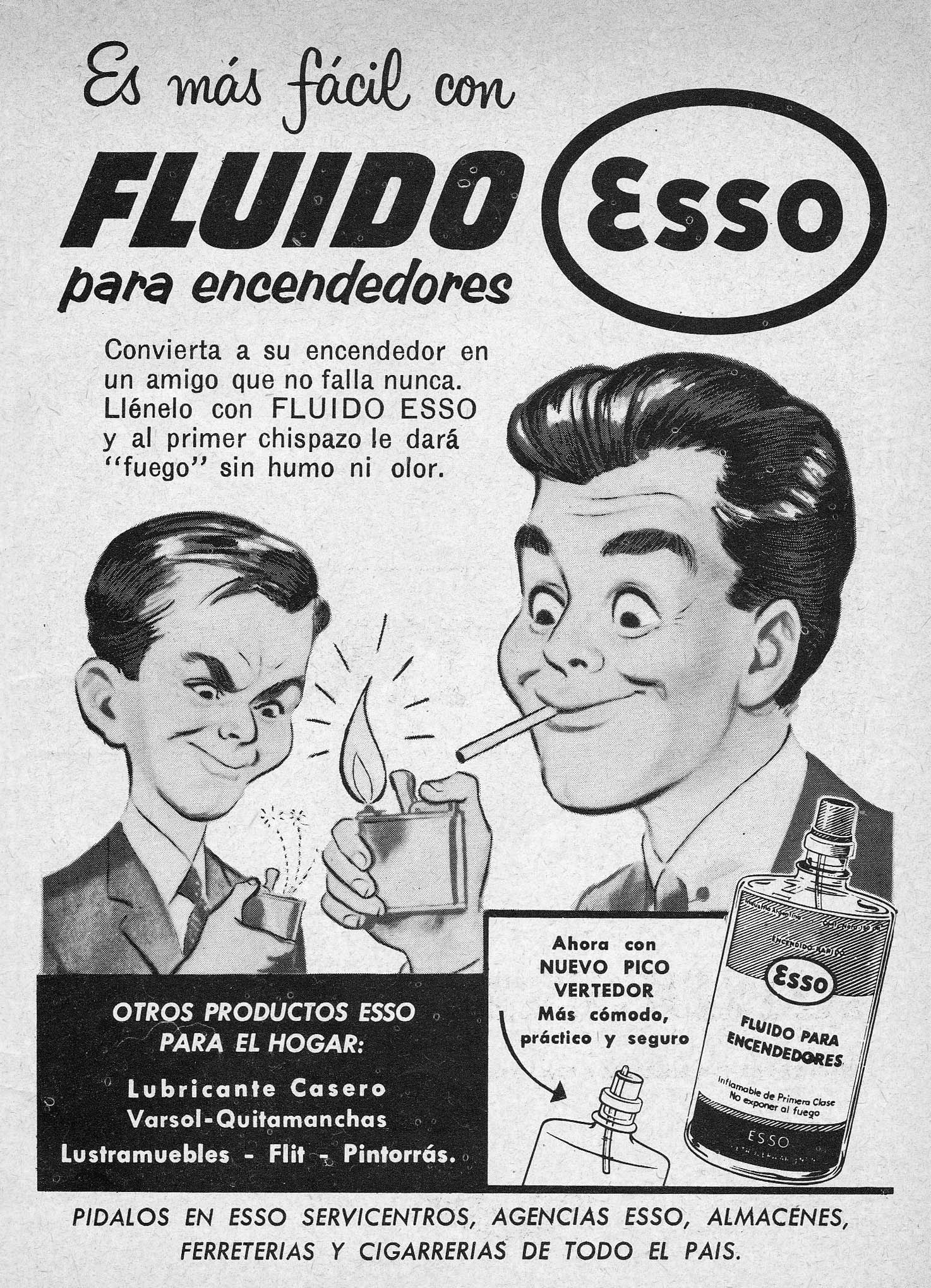
Esso advertising in France (left) for Essolube motor oil and Argentina (right) for petroleum ether

In the 1960s, campaigns featuring heavy spending in different mass media channels became more prominent. Esso spent hundreds of millions of dollars on a brand awareness campaign built around the simple and alliterative theme, "Put a Tiger in Your Tank", which was invented by Emery Smith in 1959.

The North American and later European campaign featured extensive television and radio and magazine ads, including photos with tiger tails supposedly emerging from car gas tanks, in England there were faux tiger tails with pink ribbons to tie round underneath the cap of the petrol tank so as to look as if there was a tiger in the tank: these were often seen on the road in the 1960s; at one time in England there was a television advertisement where a sombre man labelled as the advertising manager said that they were no longer going to have the tiger, followed a short while later by advertisements for the save the tiger campaign, promotional events featuring real tigers, billboards, and in Europe station pump hoses "wrapped in tiger stripes" as well as pop music songs. Tiger imagery can still be seen on the pumps of successor firm ExxonMobil.

A television advertisement from the 1980s featured Jeff Wayne's composition.

== Commercial automotive and motorcycle partnerships ==
Esso, along with its sister brands Exxon and Mobil, are official long-term recommended gasoline of two Volkswagen Group marques (mainly Bentley and Porsche), all Toyota Group marques and subsidiaries (including Toyota, Lexus, Daihatsu, Hino, and Perodua, shared with Petron) and General Motors marques and subsidiaries (including Chevrolet, Cadillac, Buick, Holden, SAIC-GM-Wuling and former GM marques such as Opel and Vauxhall) for automobiles. They are also recommended fuels for KTM motorcycles.

== Motorsports ==
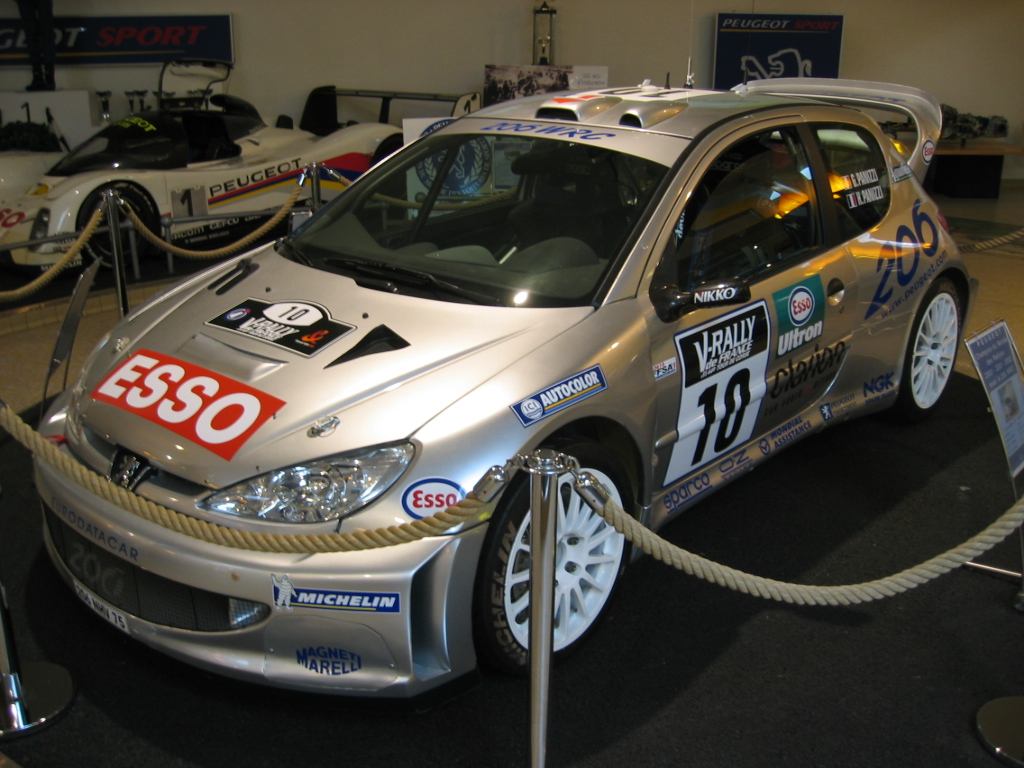
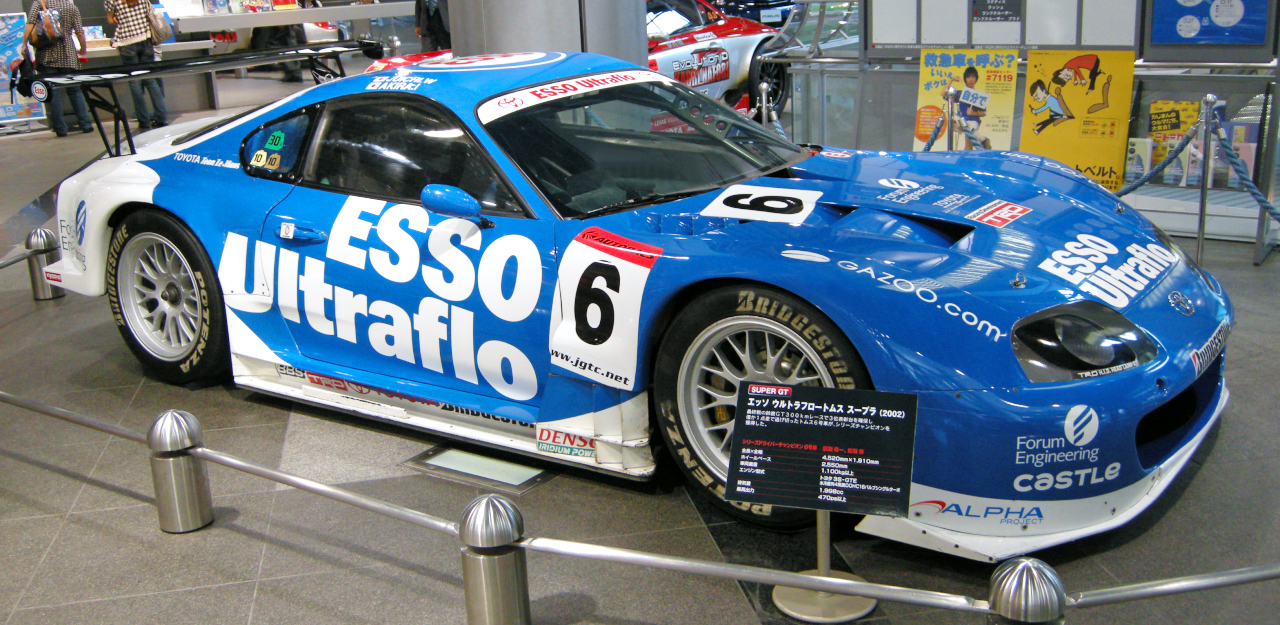
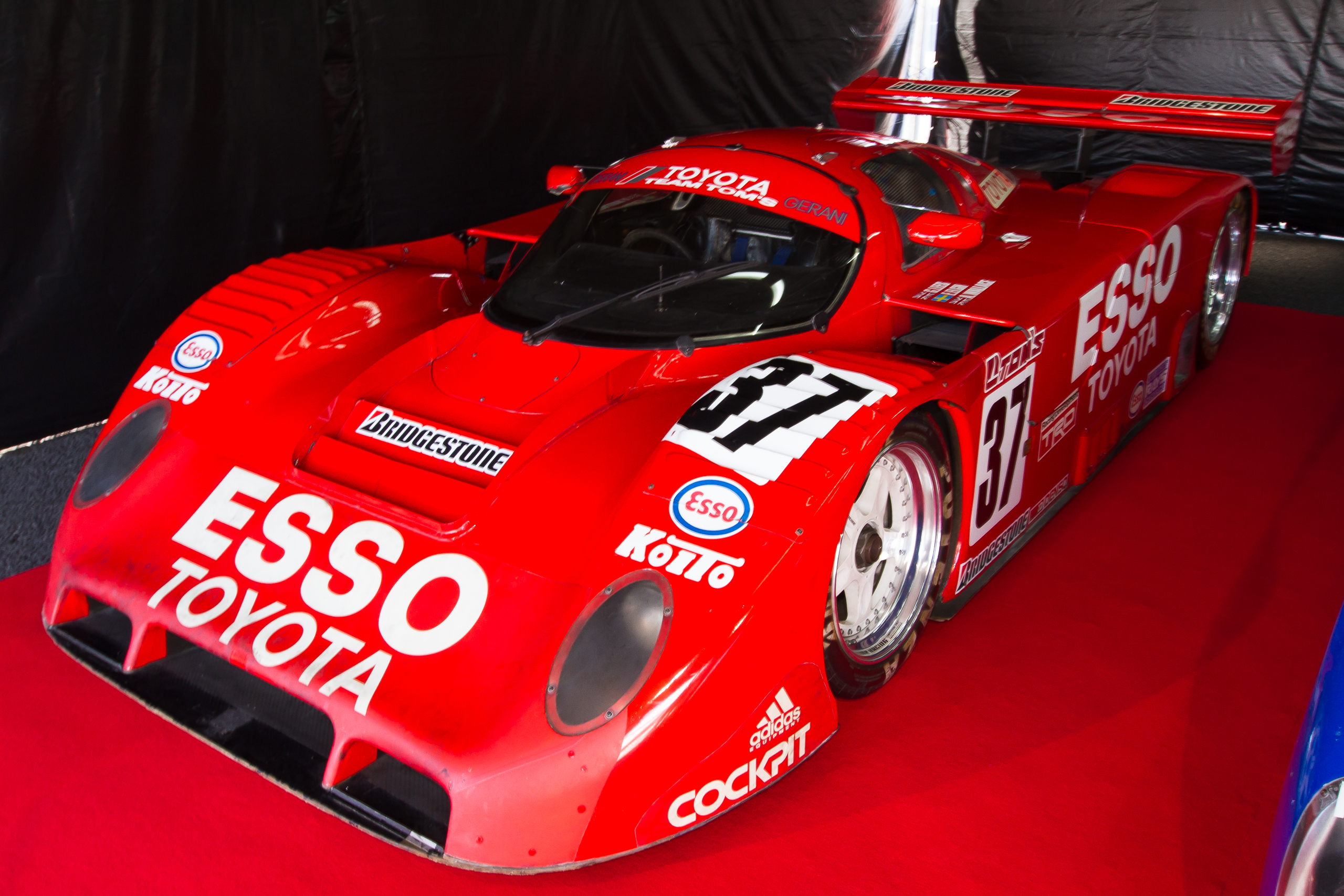
Esso sponsorship on a Peugeot 206 (left), a Toyota Supra (middle) and a Toyota 90C-V race car

Formula One team Lotus had Esso sponsorship from 1962 until 1967 while sponsoring Indianapolis 500 winner and Formula One world champion Jim Clark as well as Brabham from 1964 until 1973. From 2002 to 2009, Esso sponsored Toyota F1, as well as Jordan and its successor, Midland in 2005 and 2006, after Esso became ExxonMobil's global primary fuel brand through the merger of Exxon with Mobil in 1999. Williams F1 had one season of Esso sponsorship in 2009 when Petrobras left F1 in 2008 before they returned in 2014. The Esso brand was used in McLaren Formula One cars along with Mobil from 2014 despite Esso actually partnering and supplying fuels for McLaren team from 2015 to 2016 seasons, as well as Exxon from 2015 in United States Grand Prix only, as they are currently ExxonMobil brands after the merger. In 2017, ExxonMobil switched to Red Bull Racing, as well as Faenza-based sister team Scuderia Toro Rosso along with its successors, Scuderia AlphaTauri and Racing Bulls.

Enco, as sister brand of Esso before both renamed as Exxon in 1973, had sponsored three Indianapolis 500 winning cars in 1965, 1967 and 1968, won by Jim Clark, A. J. Foyt and Bobby Unser, powered by Ford for 1965 and 1967 seasons, and Offenhauser for 1968 season.

Esso is also active in 24 Hours of Le Mans and various endurance racing, sponsoring Martini Lancia from 1982 to 1986, Le Mans-winning Peugeot 905 from 1990 to 1993, and Toyota GT-One in 1998–99. Since 1996 Esso currently supplying fuels for all Porsche Mobil 1 Supercup entrants under Mobil brand as ExxonMobil increased its fuel partnership role with Porsche Mobil 1 Supercup as Esso since the 2015 season.
