= D'Amours =

D'Amours is a surname. Notable people with the surname include:

- Jacques D'Amours (born 1956/57), Canadian billionaire businessman
- Jean-Claude D'Amours (born 1972), Canadian politician
- Norman D'Amours (born 1937), member of the United States House of Representatives from New Hampshire

== See also ==
- Amour (disambiguation)
- D'Amour (surname)
