= L'Amour =

L'Amour may refer to:

== People ==
- Louis L'Amour (1908–1988), American cowboy novelist
- Michelle L'amour (born 1980), American neo-burlesque performer

== Other uses ==
- L'Amour (album), a 1983 album by Lewis
- L'Amour (film), a 1973 film
- L'Amour (music venue), a New York City rock venue

== See also ==
- Lamour
- Amour (disambiguation)
- D'Amour, a surname
- De l'amour, an 1822 essay by Stendhal
- L'Amore (disambiguation)
- Larmor (disambiguation)
