= Richard Fortin =

Richard Fortin may refer to:

- Richard Fortin (cricketer), (born 1941)
- Richard Fortin (businessman), (born 1949/1950)
