= Topaz Energy =

Irish petroleum retail chain

Topaz
- Company type: Private company limited by shares Subsidiary
- Industry: Oil and natural gas
- Founded: 2005
- Defunct: June 2018
- Fate: Acquired by Alimentation Couche-Tard and rebranded as Circle K
- Headquarters: Dublin, Ireland
- Area served: Ireland
- Key people: Denis O'Brien
- Products: Petroleum and derived products service stations convenience stores
- Website: www.circlek.ie

Topaz was an Irish petroleum retail chain, which had a presence across the island of Ireland. The legal entity was formed in 2005 and previously traded under the Statoil and Shell brands, until 2008 when the Topaz brand replaced both in Ireland. It acquired Esso's Irish operations in 2015. In June 2018, The Topaz brand was replaced by Circle K.

== History ==
The company was formed by Ion Equity in 2005 as a vehicle to take over part of the Irish operations of Royal Dutch Shell plc (the filling station and home heating operation, Irish Shell Limited) as well as the Irish operations of Statoil. This was controversial in itself, as the Competition Authority, which must approve large mergers and acquisitions, failed to take a decision on the takeover of Statoil's assets within the time frame allowed, thus automatically approving the deal.

The company was slow to reveal its branding strategy, continuing at first to trade under the Shell, Statoil, and Fareplay brands. However, beginning in March 2008, Topaz began replacing both these brands with its own. The Fareplay brand, to which Topaz owned worldwide rights, was also retired and replaced with a number of Topaz convenience store brands including Topaz Restore, Topaz Express and later Re.Store.

As of 2012, Topaz operated 118 Company Owned Company Operated (COCO) sites in the Republic of Ireland and 1 site in Larne, County Antrim, Northern Ireland

Billionaire Denis O'Brien acquired Topaz in December 2013, having bought €300 million of its loans from Irish Bank Resolution Corporation (IBRC). In May 2014, O'Brien appointed former Taoiseach Brian Cowen to the board of Topaz to join himself, his nephew (who is also CEO of Smiles Dental), Sean Corkery (CEO of O'Brien's Siteserv), Lucy Gaffney (chairperson of O'Brien's Communicorp) and Colm Doherty (former managing director of Allied Irish Banks). In December 2014, Topaz's parent company Kendrick Investments announced it would buy all of Esso's Irish operations. Profits at Topaz increased during O'Brien's first year of ownership.

In December 2015, it was announced that Topaz was being sold to Alimentation Couche-Tard, with Circle K's forecourt shops to be rebranded under that company's Circle K brand. The deal closed in spring 2016. Subsequently, most of the Denis O'Brien-connected Directors retired from the Board and the CFO Niall Anderton was appointed as CEO.

Topaz also introduced the Miles fuel brand in 2017; this was in all Topaz petrol stations by August 2017.

In 2018, the Topaz brand was retired in favour of Alimentation Couch-Tard's international company Circle K in April 2018.
