= Damour (surname) =

Damour is a surname. Notable people with the surname include:

- Alexis Damour (1808–1902), French mineralogist
- Lisa Damour (born 1970), American psychologist
- Loïc Damour (born 1991), French footballer
- Thibault Damour (born 1951), French physicist

== See also ==
- D'Amour
