= Alain Bouchard =

Canadian billionaire businessman

Alain Bouchard OC OQ
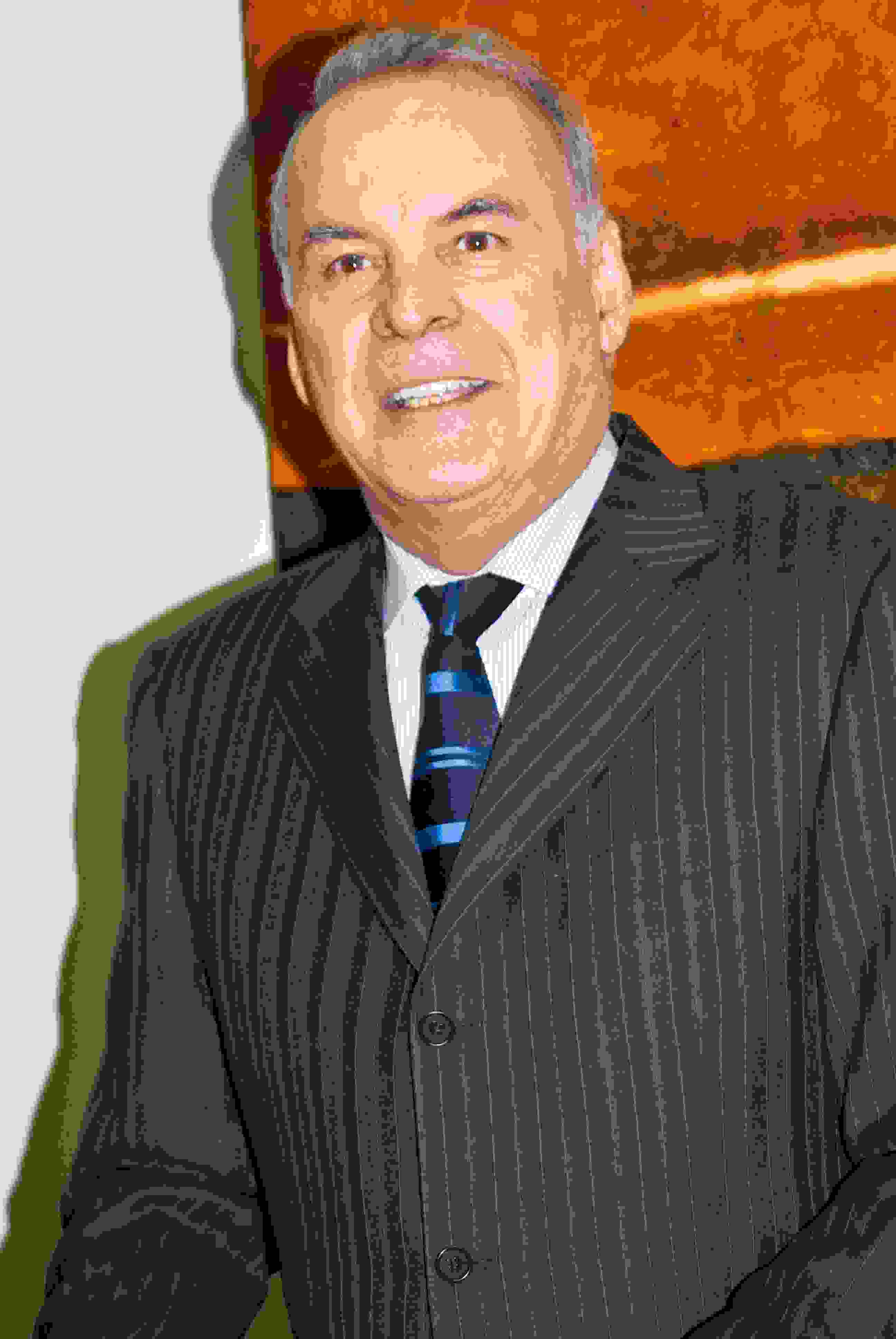
- Born: 1949 (age 76–77); Chicoutimi, Quebec, Canada
- Occupation: businessman
- Employer(s): Alimentation Couche-Tard (1980–present)
- Known for: Chairman, CEO and Co-founded Alimentation Couche-Tard
- Board member of: Atrium Innovations
- Spouse: Sandra Chartrand
- Children: 4

Alain Bouchard OC OQ (born 1949) is a Canadian billionaire businessman. He is co-founder and chairman of Alimentation Couche-Tard, and is on the board of directors of Atrium Innovations. Both corporations are based in Quebec.

== Early life ==
Alain Bouchard was born in 1949, in Chicoutimi, Quebec, and was one of six children. His parents were devout Catholics, as was most of Quebec at that time. His father, Jean-Paul Bouchard, owned an excavation company and was ambitious and a tireless worker, despite only having three years of elementary school education. Bouchard’s mother, who went to school through the seventh grade, managed the company’s finances.

Bouchard's father once owned and managed a road-construction business in Quebec. When his father's company went bankrupt, the family moved to a mobile home in the village of Micoua.

== Career ==
At nineteen, Bouchard worked as a stock boy in his brother's Perrette milk store and in 1969 was hired by Perrette's owner to scout and set up new stores. After Bouchard had opened 100 of Perrette’s 184 stores, he left Perrette because he believed that the company did not treat its employees well. He then joined Provi-Soir, a competitor, as the head of development, construction, and real estate. Wanting to open his own store, Bouchard also attended business courses at HEC Montreal for three years while studying English. He eventually bought two Provi-Soir franchises using his earnings from private real-estate investments.

In the late 1970s, Bouchard worked independently as a retailer before founding Alimentation Couche-Tard in 1980. As CEO of Alimentation Couche-Tard from 1980 to 2014, Bouchard led the company as it expanded from one convenience store to more than 12,500 around the world. Maintaining a decentralized organization structure and using the best ideas found in the organization has been noted by Bouchard as factors in Couche-Tard's success. In 2003 the company acquired U.S. based Circle K.

== Organizations and recognition ==
Bouchard was a member of the board of Québecor from 1997 to 2009. With a net worth of US$6.2 billion in 2023, Bouchard was in the top 10 of richest people in the province of Quebec and top 25 in Canada, and was named Canada's Outstanding CEO of the Year for 2012. He is the recipient of an International Horatio Alger Award.

== Personal life ==
Bouchard is married and a father of four children, Jonathan, Karinne, Camille and Rose.

The Sandra and Alain Bouchard Foundation is devoted to helping those with intellectual challenges as well as the arts and culture. The foundation also financed the Pierre Lassonde Pavilion at the Musée national des beaux-arts du Québec in Quebec City.
