= D'Amour =

D'Amour is a surname. Notable people with the surname include:

- Nicholas D’Amour (born 2001), A two time Olympian in the sport of archery representing the Virgin Islands, and former world #3 as well as World cup finalist
- Denis D'Amour (1959–2005), Canadian guitarist for the heavy metal band Voivod
- France D'Amour (born 1967), a Quebecoise francophone pop music singer
- Francine D'Amour (born 1946), a Quebecoise educator and writer
- Frenchy D'Amour (1912–?), Canadian curler, 1948 Brier champion
- Paul D'Amour (born 1967), an American musician, and the first bass guitarist for progressive metal band Tool

== See also ==
- Damour (surname)
- D'Amours (surname)
- Amour (disambiguation)
- L'Amour (disambiguation)
