= Lamour =

Lamour is a French surname and rarely also a given name. Notable people with the name include:

== Surname ==
- Claude Lamour (born 1969), French racing cyclist
- Dorothy Lamour (1914–1996), American film actress
- Jean-François Lamour (born 1956), French politician and former fencer
- Marguerite Lamour (1956–2026), French politician
- Moe Jeudy-Lamour, Canadian actor of Haitian descent
- Pascal Lamour (born 1958), French Breton musician

== Given name ==
- Lamour Desrances (died 1803), Haitian revolutionary leader

== See also ==
- L'Amour (disambiguation)
- Larmor (disambiguation)
