= Amour =

Amour (French for love) is a word used in English and French, and may also refer to:

- Amour (1970 film), a Danish film
- Amour (2012 film), a French-language film directed by Michael Haneke
- Amour (musical), a 1997 stage musical by Michel Legrand
- Amour (Stockhausen), a 1974–76 cycle of clarinet pieces by Karlheinz Stockhausen
- Amour (Vidhan Sabha constituency), an assembly constituency in Purnia district, Bihar, India
- Amour Abdenour (born 1952), Kabyle singer, songwriter, and composer
- Amour Patrick Tignyemb (born 1985), Cameroonian footballer
- "Amour", a song by Rammstein from Reise, Reise
- "Amour", a song by Jean-Michel Blais from Aubades
- Kimora Amour, Canadian drag queen

== See also ==
- "Amour, Amour", a song by Plastic Bertrand
- D'Amour (surname)
- L'Amour (disambiguation)
- Saint-Amour (disambiguation)
- Amore (disambiguation)
- Armour (disambiguation)
- Love (disambiguation)
