= Larmor (disambiguation) =

Joseph Larmor (1857–1942) was a British physicist and mathematician.

Larmor may also refer to:

- Larmor (crater), on the Moon
- LARMOR neutron microscope, a planned microscope based on neutron scattering
- Larmor precession and Larmor frequency, the precession of the magnetic moment
- Larmor formula, to calculate the total power radiated by a non relativistic point charge as it accelerates or decelerates
- Larmor radius, the radius of the circular motion of a charged particle in the presence of a uniform magnetic field
- Larmor's theorem, by Joseph Larmor

== See also ==
- Lamour (disambiguation)
