= Mac's =

Canadian chain of convenience stores

Mac's Convenience Stores
- Formerly: Mac's Milk (1961–1975)
- Type: Subsidiary
- Founded: 1961; 65 years ago (Richmond Hill, Ontario, Canada)
- Defunct: 2017; 9 years ago
- Fate: Acquired by Alimentation Couche-Tard and rebranded as Circle K
- Successor: Circle K
- Number of locations: 5,906
- Website: https://www.circlek.com/

Mac's Convenience Stores (known colloquially as Mac's or Mac's Milk) was a chain of convenience stores in Canada. The company was divided into three geographic business units: eastern Canada, central Canada, and western Canada by Circle K. It had been owned and operated by Alimentation Couche-Tard since 1999. Since 2017, it served as one of Couche-Tard's two main banners in English-speaking Canada, alongside Circle K. The brand has been phased out in favour of the Circle K banner.

== History ==
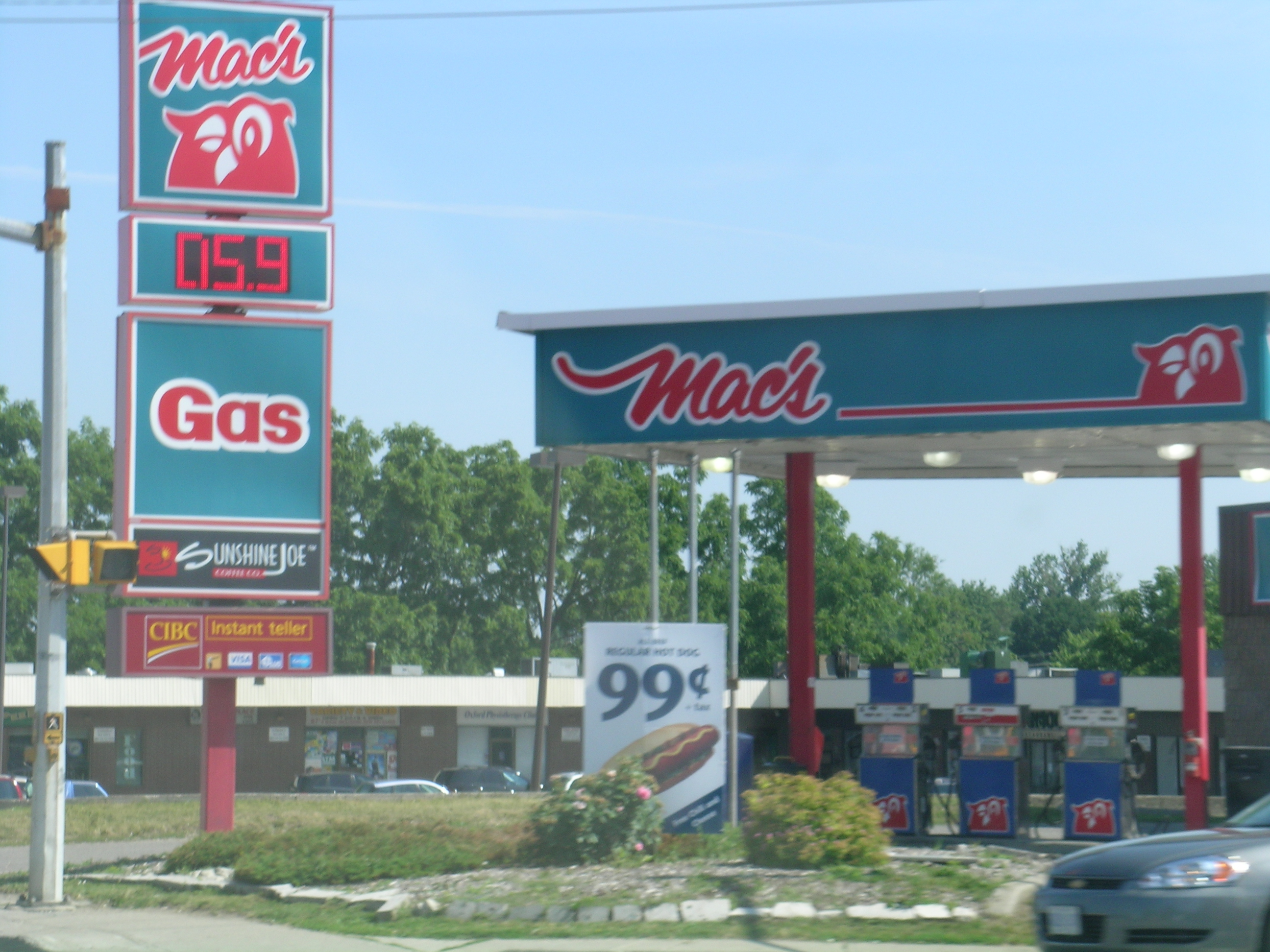
Mac's with gas station in Woodstock, Ontario

Kenneth (Ken) and Carl McGowen incorporated Mac's Milk Limited in Ontario on April 4, 1962. On July 5, 1963, Silverwood Dairies Limited acquired 40% of the shares of Mac's Milk Limited, and increased its holding to 80% on March 29, 1968, and 100% on January 12, 1972.

In 1971, the company purchased 18 convenience stores operating under the "Little Z Convenience Stores" banner from Zehrs Markets. In 1974, it bought thirteen Mini-Mart convenience stores in Vancouver from a subsidiary of George Weston Limited and seven Starlite Variety Stores operating in Windsor, Ontario.

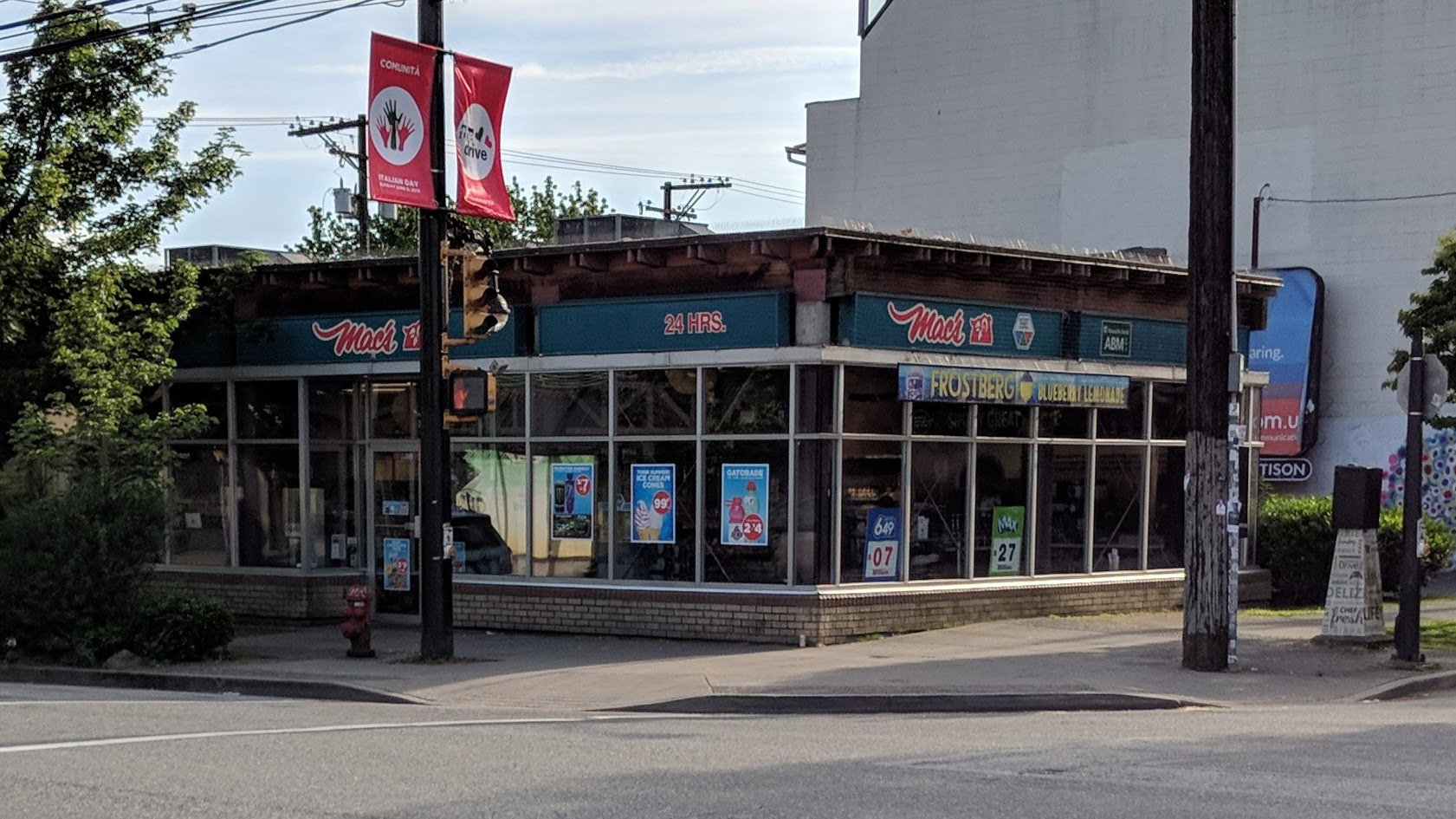
A former Mac's store in Vancouver, British Columbia, in May 2019, which has since been converted to a Circle K

The company was renamed "Mac's Convenience Stores Limited" on May 7, 1975. In 1976, Silverwood Dairies Limited purchased shares of Royal Oak Dairy, including operations of convenience stores under the Bantam and Astro names.

In 1994, the company sold most of the Mac's stores in Quebec to Alimentation Couche-Tard Ltd. Mac's stores in Quebec were renamed "Dépan-Escompte Couche-Tard". Silcorp, the parent company of Mac's, acquired 163 Southern Ontario stores, and assets of rival Becker's in November 1996. On April 14, 1999, Alimentation Couche-Tard Inc. purchased Silcorp (including the Mac's and Becker's chains). Mac's dropped its longtime cat logo, and replaced it with Couche-Tard's owl logo.

On September 23, 2015, Alimentation Couche-Tard announced that as part of a global re-branding, all Mac's stores would be converted to Couche-Tard's Circle K banner; the Canadian renaming began in May 2017.

== Marketing ==
The original mascot

The original mascot for Mac's was a cat named MacTavish, wearing a Tam o' shanter and a kilt, holding a jug of milk. Following Mac's acquisition by Couche-Tard in 1999, it was changed to the winking owl, named "Hibou" (the French translation of "owl"), which is the mascot for Couche-Tard's convenience stores and gas stations in Quebec.
