= Couche-Tard =

Canadian multinational convenience store company

Alimentation Couche-Tard Inc.
- Type: Public
- Traded as: TSX: ATD; S&P/TSX 60 component
- Industry: Retail
- Founded: 1980; 46 years ago
- Founder: Alain Bouchard; Jacques D'Amours; Richard Fortin; Réal Plourde
- Headquarters: Laval, Quebec, Canada
- Number of locations: 17,300 (2026)
- Area served: 27 countries and territories: United States, Canada, Denmark, Estonia, Ireland, Latvia, Lithuania, Norway, Poland, Sweden, Hong Kong, Egypt, Guam, Guatemala, Germany, Belgium, Luxembourg, Netherlands, Honduras, Indonesia, Macau, Mexico, New Zealand, Saudi Arabia, Vietnam, UAE, Morocco
- Key people: Alain Bouchard (chairman); Alex Miller (CEO)
- Revenue: ▲$72.86 billion (2025)
- Operating income: ▲$13.021 billion (2025)
- Net income: ▼$3.806 billion (2025)
- Number of employees: around 149,000 (2024)
- Divisions: Couche-Tard; Circle K On the Run; Holiday Stationstores
- Website: www.couche-tard.com

Alimentation Couche-Tard Inc., or simply Couche-Tard, is a Canadian multinational operator of convenience stores. The company operates approximately 16,700 stores across Canada, the United States, Mexico, Ireland, Norway, Sweden, Denmark, Estonia, Latvia, Lithuania, Poland, Japan, Hong Kong, and Indonesia. The company operates its corporate stores mainly under the Couche-Tard, Circle K, and On the Run brands but also under the affiliated brands Mac's Convenience Stores, GetGo, go! (Go Store), Provi-Soir, 7-jours, Dairy/Daisy Mart, Becker's and Winks.

Founded by current chairman Alain Bouchard, the corporation is based in Laval, Quebec, Canada, a suburb of Montreal. The flagship Couche-Tard and Mac's stores, as well as some older Winks outlets, prominently feature a distinctive anthropomorphic red, winking owl. This mascot was inherited from the Provi-Soir / Winks chain when it was absorbed in the late 1990s.

In French, "couche-tard" literally translates to "sleep-late" and means "(person who) goes to bed late", with connotations very similar to "night owl" in English.

== History ==
Alain Bouchard opened his first convenience store in 1980 in Laval. In 1985, Bouchard acquired 11 "Couche-Tard" branded stores in the Quebec City area which he merged with its existing stores in the Montreal area to rename the whole company "Alimentation Couche-Tard". In 1987, the company purchased the 7 Jours chain from Metro-Richelieu, which Couche-Tard has kept a separate chain to this day.

In 1992, the chain gradually converted to the new discount banner "Dépan-Escompte", beginning with 34 stores mostly located in the Quebec City area. In 1993, the company purchased 54 Mac's and La Maisonnée convenience stores from the troubled Silcorp Ltd. of Toronto. In 1994, Couche-Tard completed the conversion of its 182 stores to the Dépan-Escompte banner which included the Mac's/La Maisonnée locations but not the 7 Jours chain. In the summer of 1994, Couche-Tard made a deal to acquire the 86 convenience stores from the Perette chain which had filed for bankruptcy protection in June 1994. During the Dépan-Escompte era, a piggy bank mascot was adopted and replaced the previous Couche-Tard sleepwalker mascot from the late 1980s and early 1990s.

In May 1997, Couche-Tard acquired C Corp, a subsidiary of Provigo that owned the chains Provi-Soir in Quebec, Winks in Ontario and Red Rooster in Alberta. Couche-Tard, which was already dominating its industry, grew to 610 outlets in Canada following the transaction. In early 1999, Dépan-Escompte Couche-Tard and Provi-Soir merged into a single branding; reverting to the Couche-Tard name without "Dépan-Escompte" (albeit with a new logotype), but adopting the owl mascot of Provi-Soir. The company has since revived the Provi-Soir name in Quebec which it keeps as a distinct chain, much like the 7 Jours division. The new Provi-Soir, basically a combination of rebranded Couche-Tard and 7 Jours locations, does not feature the owl mascot from the original chain and its logotype is completely different than in its last incarnation.

Similarly, Silcorp had consolidated several of the largest Ontario convenience-store chains, such as Mac's and Becker's, under its ownership before being itself acquired by Couche-Tard. As in Quebec, other corporate banners such as Becker's and Mike's Mart are slowly being phased out in favour of the dominant Mac's brand, although new franchised stores are still being opened under the Winks and Daisy Mart brands.

In 2001, Couche-Tard broke into the American market with the acquisition of 172 Bigfoot convenience stores from Johnson Oil Company of Columbus, Indiana. As part of its United States expansion, the company made another signification acquisition in 2002 by acquiring Hudson, Ohio-based Dairy Mart Convenience Stores, totaling an additional 287 stores. In 2006, it also acquired 54 stores from Akron, Ohio-based Holland Oil. This created a significant presence for the company in Northeast Ohio.

After making some tentative moves in the U.S. under the Mac's brand in the early 2000s, Couche-Tard acquired the Circle K chain from ConocoPhillips in 2003, promptly rebranding its existing U.S. locations to the better-known Circle K moniker. The Circle K brand is also franchised in Asia and elsewhere.

Couche-Tard obtained the master franchise for Dunkin' Donuts in Quebec in August 2003, but agreed in August 2008 to terminate this franchise within 12 to 18 months.

In early 2010, Couche-Tard started consolidating its outlets in Quebec by closing down many of those that did not do well in sales, and therefore allowing the successful ones to prosper. In all, over 300 stores were closed from 2010 through 2012.

In 2014, Couche-Tard sold off its Tiendas Extra chain, a subsidiary of Circle K, in Mexico to Grupo Modelo.

On December 18, 2014, Couche-Tard announced its plans to acquire The Pantry, owner of Kangaroo Express stores in the Southeast and Gulf Coast, for $860 million (~$1.12 billion in 2024) all cash tender. The acquisition was completed in March 2015.

In 2015, Manulife Bank of Canada reached a deal with Couche-Tard to add its ATMs to 830 locations.

On September 23, 2015, Couche-Tard announced that it would relaunch the Circle K brand, and extend it to all of its stores in English Canada, the United States, and Scandinavia. The rebranding did not include its stores in Quebec, which remained under the Couche-Tard brand; Couche-Tard would later undergo a rebranding in 2021 to align it with Circle K's brand identity, switching to its red and yellow corporate colors and an encircled logo.

On August 29, 2016, the purchase of 53 Cracker Barrel convenience stores in Louisiana for an undisclosed price was announced.

In July 2017, Couche-Tard announced an agreement to acquire Holiday Stationstores, the 18th largest convenience store chain in the United States, with over 500 locations in 10 states.

In August 2020, Couche-Tard was out-bid by 7-Eleven's US$21 billion acquisition of 3900 Speedway locations from Marathon Petroleum.

In July 2021, Couche-Tard announced a deal to purchase the 226 retail gasoline/convenience stores and marine fuel terminal of Truro, Nova Scotia-based Wilson Fuel for an undisclosed amount, pending approval by the Competition Bureau. The acquisition was completed on March 1, 2023. To alleviate competition concerns, Couche-Tard sold 52 locations to Harnois Énergies.

Operations in Russia (38 stores) were suspended in 2022.

In December 2022, Couche-Tard announced an agreement to acquire U.S. express car wash operator True Blue Car Wash (which operates under the Clean Freak and Rainstorm banners in the southwestern and midwestern United States respectively).

On February 27, 2023, Couche-Tard announced plans to acquire Big Red Stores, based in Arkansas. The acquisition was completed on April 18, 2023, expanding Circle K's presence in Arkansas.

In March 2023, Couche-Tard announced the acquisition of 1,600 TotalEnergies service stations in Germany and the Netherlands, for an undisclosed sum. At the same time in Belgium and Luxembourg, Couche-Tard and TotalEnergies announced the creation of a joint venture to take over TotalEnergies' 619 service stations. The following month, the company signed an agreement to buy 112 service stations and convenience stores from MAPCO Express in the United States.

On August 19, 2024, Couche-Tard announced that they had acquired all 270 GetGo stores from Giant Eagle for an undisclosed sum. It was also announced that GetGo stores would continue to offer Giant Eagle's MyPerks rewards program after the sale concludes. The deal closed June 29, 2025.

On the same day that the GetGo deal was announced, Couche-Tard also offered to buy the Japanese company Seven & I Holdings, operator of the international chain of 7-Eleven convenience stores and later that year sent a revised offer after initial bid was rejected. On July 17, 2025 they withdrew the offer for 7-Eleven.

In July 2026, the company announced its intention to acquire a controlling stake in Żabka Group, a Polish rival, through an offer valued at more than $12 billion.

== Recent and current operations ==
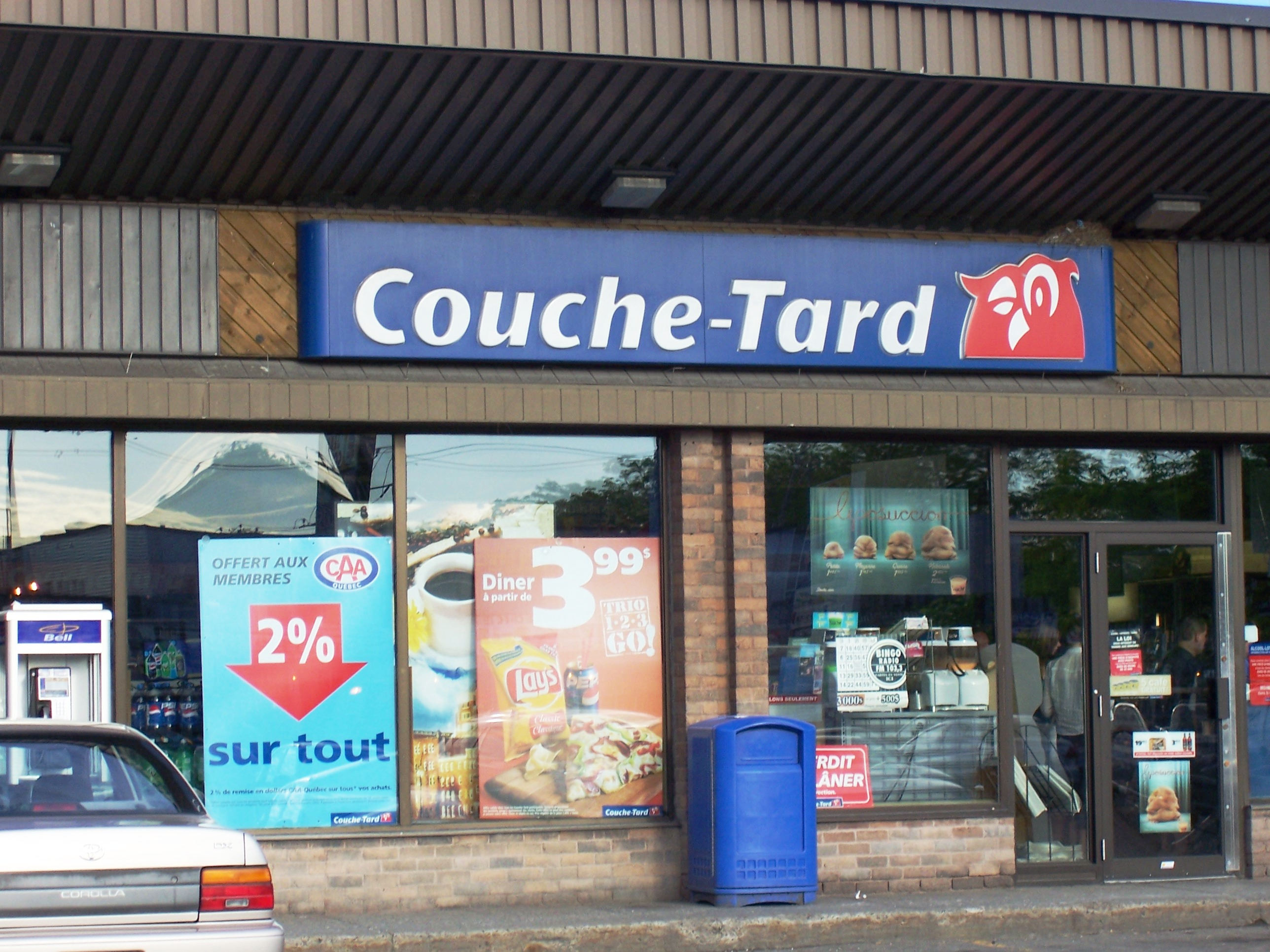
Entrance of a Couche-Tard store in Montreal, Quebec

In Canada, there are 581 corporate stores in Quebec under the names Couche-Tard, Provi-Soir and Dépanneur 7 jours as well as 298 affiliated stores. In Ontario, there are 702 corporate stores and 214 affiliated stores, and in Western Canada, 305 corporate stores and 71 affiliates operated under the names Mac's, Mike's Mart, Becker's (operated independently), Daisy Mart, and Winks. Locations outside of Quebec have been rebranded as Circle K stores (excluding Becker's).

The brands operated by Couche-Tard are:

- Circle K: the group's primary brand, used internationally.
- Holiday Stationstores: American brand, referred to as the Northern Tier region.
- Couche-Tard: Quebec brand
- Ingo: Swedish and Danish brand of unmanned fuel stations
- On the Run: international (retired brand)
- Becker's: Ontario (retired brand)
- Mac's: Canada (retired brand)
- Kangaroo Express (retired brand)
- Topaz: Ireland (retired brand)

=== Irving Oil stores ===
Many Couche-Tard locations are gas stations co-branded with Irving Oil. The first stage of this partnership began in 2001 in Quebec. Both companies contributed locations to the partnership: some had convenience stores that previously operated under Irving's "Marché Mainway" banner, while others previously sold fuel under the Couche-Tard brand. All these locations now have Couche-Tard convenience stores and Irving-branded fuel.

The partnership expanded in 2008, as Irving leased its remaining Bluecanoe and Mainway convenience stores to Couche-Tard, expanding the latter chain's reach into Atlantic Canada and New England under the Circle K brand. Irving continues to own the buildings and property, and supplies Irving-branded fuel to these stations.

=== On the Run stores ===
In the United States, approximately 470 On the Run stores are owned or franchised by Alimentation Couche-Tard under an agreement with ExxonMobil announced April 29, 2009. This also includes 43 ExxonMobil stations in the Phoenix, Arizona market, all of which have been rebranded to Circle K. While many On the Run stations in the United States still sell Exxon or Mobil gasoline, some franchised locations sell other brands not associated with ExxonMobil.

=== Circle K ===
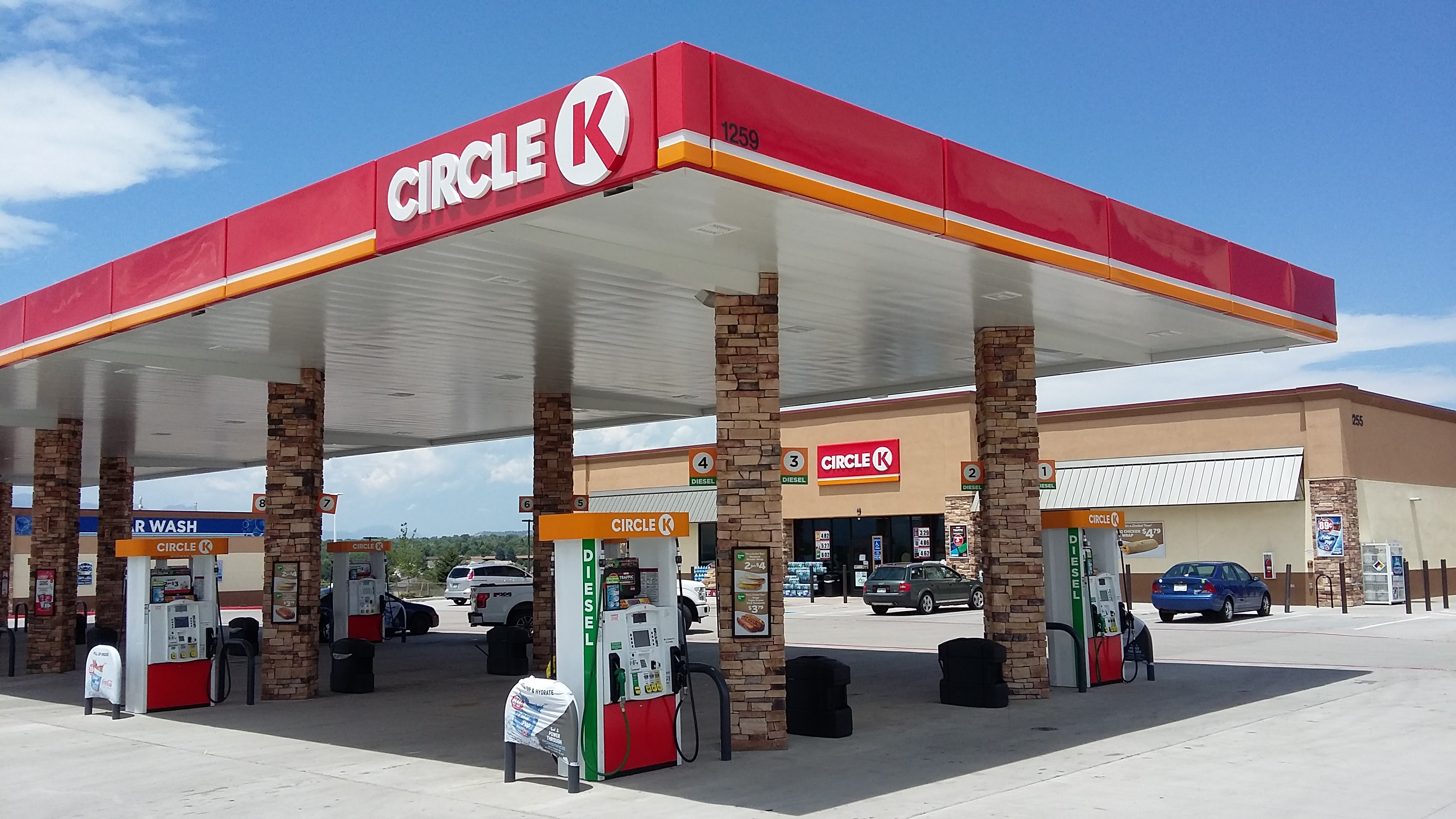
A Circle K in Colorado Springs, CO.

Circle K is an international chain of convenience stores owned by Alimentation Couche-Tard. The brand is the flagship international brand of the company, and has largely replaced other brands previously used or acquired by the company.

=== Couche-Tard ===
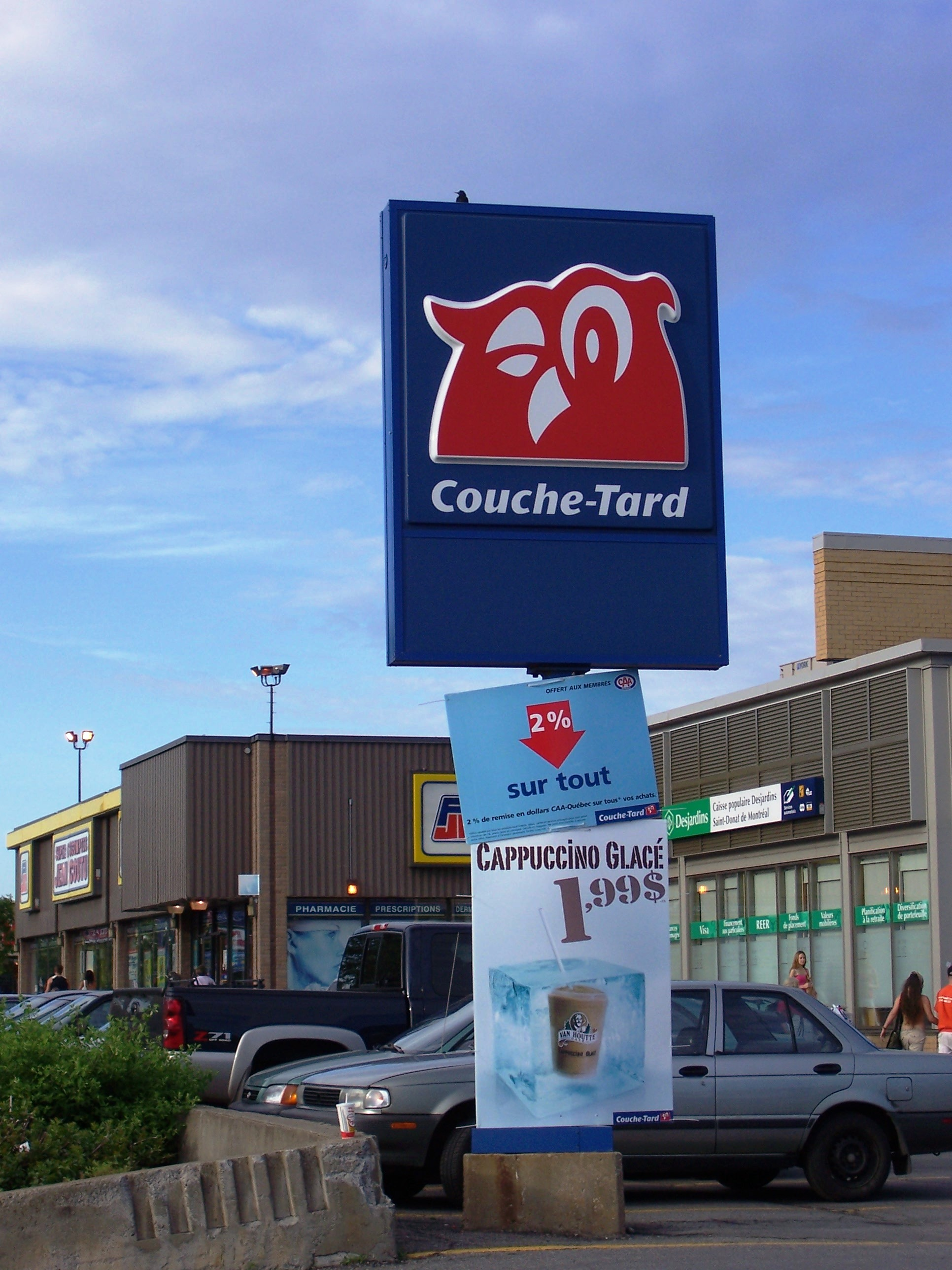
Sign of a Couche-Tard store in Montreal, Quebec

Couche-Tard is the original brand of Alimentation Couche-Tard. The brand is present only in Québec along with Provi-Soir and Dépanneur 7 jours.

=== Casey's General Stores ===
In March 2010, Couche-Tard offered $1.9 billion for control of the Iowa-based Casey's General Stores chain, and later announced a proxy fight for control. Casey's rejected Couche-Tard's offer and was successful in September 2010 in retaining its board of directors vs. Couche-Tard's nominated slate.

=== Statoil ===
On April 18, 2012, Couche-Tard agreed to buy Norway's Statoil Fuel and Retail (previously owned by Statoil) for $2.8 billion, giving Couche-Tard the largest chain of petrol stations in Scandinavia and with a presence around the Baltic region, Poland, and Russia. On June 20, 2012, Statoil Fuel and Retail's shareholders voted in favor (+91.56%) of the acquisition and later it was declared that Couche-Tard had finally acquired 100% of Statoil Fuel and Retail for approximately 2.8 billion $US (forcing the minority shareholders to sell their shares). This acquisition added over 2,853 stores to Couche-Tard's portfolio and a mega-presence in Europe. Alain Bouchard planned to grow this newly acquired chain all over Europe. In 2016, all Statoil stations were rebranded to Circle K.

=== Imperial Oil retail ===
On March 8, 2016, Couche-Tard announced it had agreed to purchase Imperial Oil's Esso retail locations in Ontario (228 locations) and Quebec (50 locations) for $2.8 billion. The stations' convenience stores would be re-branded as Circle K in Ontario, and all would remain supplied by Esso.

=== CST Brands ===
On August 22, 2016, Couche-Tard agreed to buy American company CST Brands and its 2,000 stores, mostly in Texas and other southern states, for $3.78 billion, $4.4 billion including debt. This deal, which was the largest purchase in their history, officially closed on June 28, 2017. Couche-Tard has announced that it will sell around 45% of the new stores to another company to pass competition laws. CST Holdings was based in San Antonio and employed over 14,000 people at the 2,000 stores Couche-Tard took over. The stores acquired were mostly in the southwestern and southeastern United States, with a small presence in New York and Eastern Canada, operating under the Corner Stores, Flash Foods, and Nice N Easy Grocery Shoppes brands. Most locations were rebranded to the Circle K brand after the acquisition.

Due to competition concerns, most of CST's Ultramar operations in Canada were not included in the deal, which were sold off separately to Parkland Fuel Corporation.

=== COPEC ===
In November 2023, Alimentation Couche-Tard Inc., finalized the acquisition of 112 MAPCO Express Inc. fuel and convenience retail sites from Compañía de Petróleos de Chile S.A. (COPEC), as part of COPEC's divestiture of its MAPCO assets. The stores, located across Tennessee, Alabama, Kentucky, and Georgia, will undergo rebranding to the Circle K identity. This transaction, which also includes surplus property and a logistics fleet, complements Couche-Tard's significant global presence, which encompasses over 14,000 stores in 24 countries and territories and employs approximately 122,000 people. Concurrently, Majors Management LLC acquired 192 MAPCO-branded stores and additional MAPCO assets, aiming to enhance service and expand both companies' market reach in the southeastern U.S.

=== Other transactions ===
In January 2021, Couche-Tard and Carrefour SA announced that they are looking at operational partnerships after takeover talks were abandoned.
