= Wilson Fuel =

Nova Scotia-based petroleum distributor

The Wilson Fuel Company Limited, often shortened to Wilson Fuel, is an independent petroleum wholesaler, distributor and retailer headquartered in Truro, Nova Scotia.

Its retail network included locations branded under the Wilsons Gas Stops and Go! Store brands, most of which supplied by Imperial Oil.

In July 2021, Quebec based Couche-Tard announced an agreement to purchase Wilson's retail gasoline/convenience store network and marine fuel terminal, for an undisclosed amount, pending approval by the Competition Bureau. Wilson Home Heating, Wilson Security, Kerr Controls and Ski Wentworth were not involved in the deal. The acquisition was completed in 2023; Couche-Tard was ordered to divest some of the acquired assets, and reached an agreement to sell 52 locations to Quebecois company Harnois Énergies.
