= Saint-Amour =

Saint-Amour may refer to:

- Saint-Amour-Bellevue, a commune in the Saône-et-Loire département in France
- Saint-Amour wine, one of the ten crus of Beaujolais
- Saint-Amour, Jura, a commune in the Jura département in France
- William of Saint-Amour, a figure in 13th-century scholasticism, chiefly notable for his withering attacks on the friars
- Martin St. Amour, Canadian professional ice hockey player
- Saint-Amour (film), a 2016 French-Belgian film
