= Jacques D'Amours =

Canadian billionaire businessman

- Born: 1956 or 1957 (age 69–70)
- Occupation: Businessman
- Known for: Co-founder, Couche-Tard
- Spouse: Married
- Children: 2

Jacques D'Amours (born 1956/1957) is a Canadian billionaire businessman, and a director and co-founder of the convenience store chain Couche-Tard.

== Career ==
D'Amours co-founded Couche-Tard in 1980, the youngest of the four co-founders. During his 34 years with the company he held a number of roles, including manager of technical services, vice-president of sales, and vice-president of administration and operations.

On September 1, 2021, Couche-Tard announced the election details of directors and Jacques D'Amours was in a nominee. In 2023, he retired from the board. As of 2024, he remains the second largest shareholder with 6.3% of the company.

D'Amours has been a billionaire since 2005. As of December 2024, Forbes estimates his net worth at $3.7 billion. Maclean's ranks him as the 33rd richest Canadian.

== Personal life ==
He is married with two children and lives in Montreal, Quebec.
