= Richard Fortin (businessman) =

Canadian billionaire businessman

- Born: 1949 or 1950 (age 76–77)
- Education: Université Laval
- Occupation: Businessman
- Known for: Co-founder, Couche-Tard
- Children: Éric Fortin

Richard Fortin (born 1949/1950) is a Canadian billionaire businessman, and a director, co-founder and former chief financial officer and chairman of the convenience store chain Couche-Tard.

== Early life ==
Fortin earned a bachelor's degree in management with a major in finance from Université Laval in Quebec City.

== Career ==
Fortin worked in finance for 13 years, and was a vice-president of the Canadian subsidiary of Société Générale. In 1984, he was a co-founder of Couche-Tard. From 1984 to 2008 he was chief financial officer, and chairman from 2008 to 2011.

Fortin is a director of Transcontinental. From 2013 to 2018, he was a director of the National Bank of Canada.

In March 2019, Couche-Tard's rising share price meant that Fortin became a billionaire.
