= Slurpee =

Frozen beverage sold by 7-Eleven

- Logo used since 2023
- Type: Carbonated slushy
- Manufacturer: 7-Eleven, A-Plus, Speedway, Stripes
- Origin: United States
- Introduced: 1966
- Website: www.7-eleven.com/products/slurpee

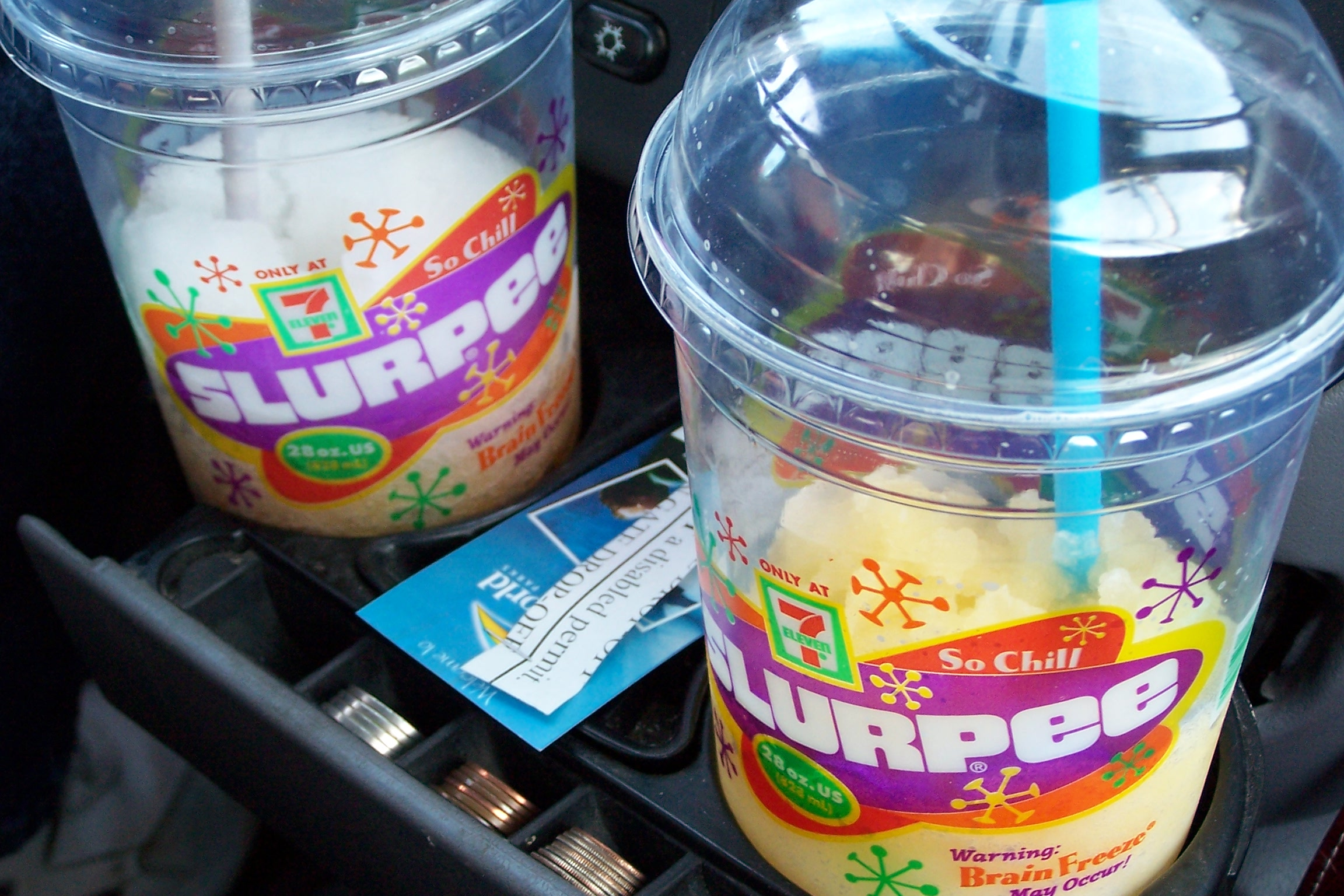
Two large Slurpees.

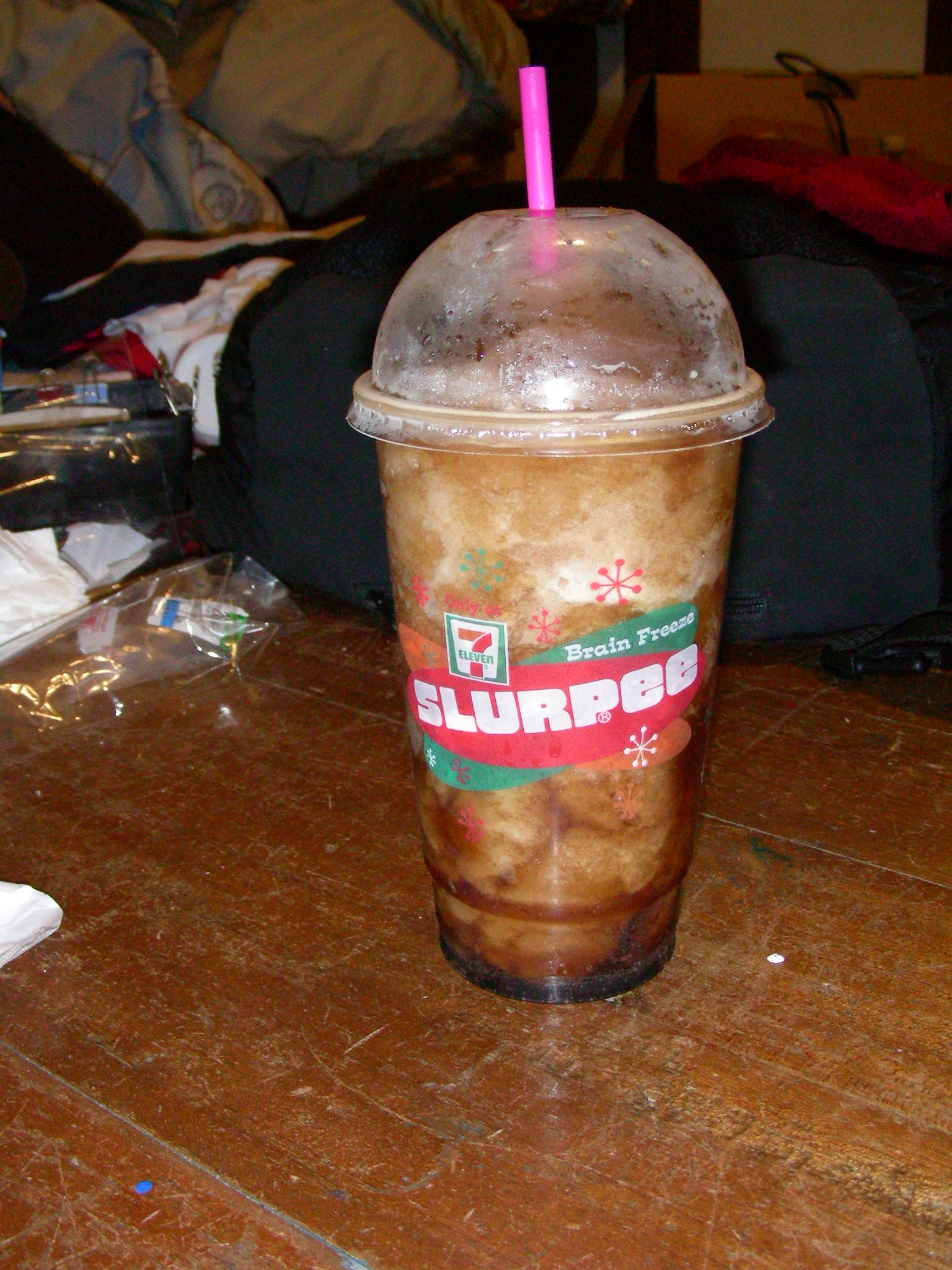
A Coca-Cola "Brain Freeze" Slurpee.

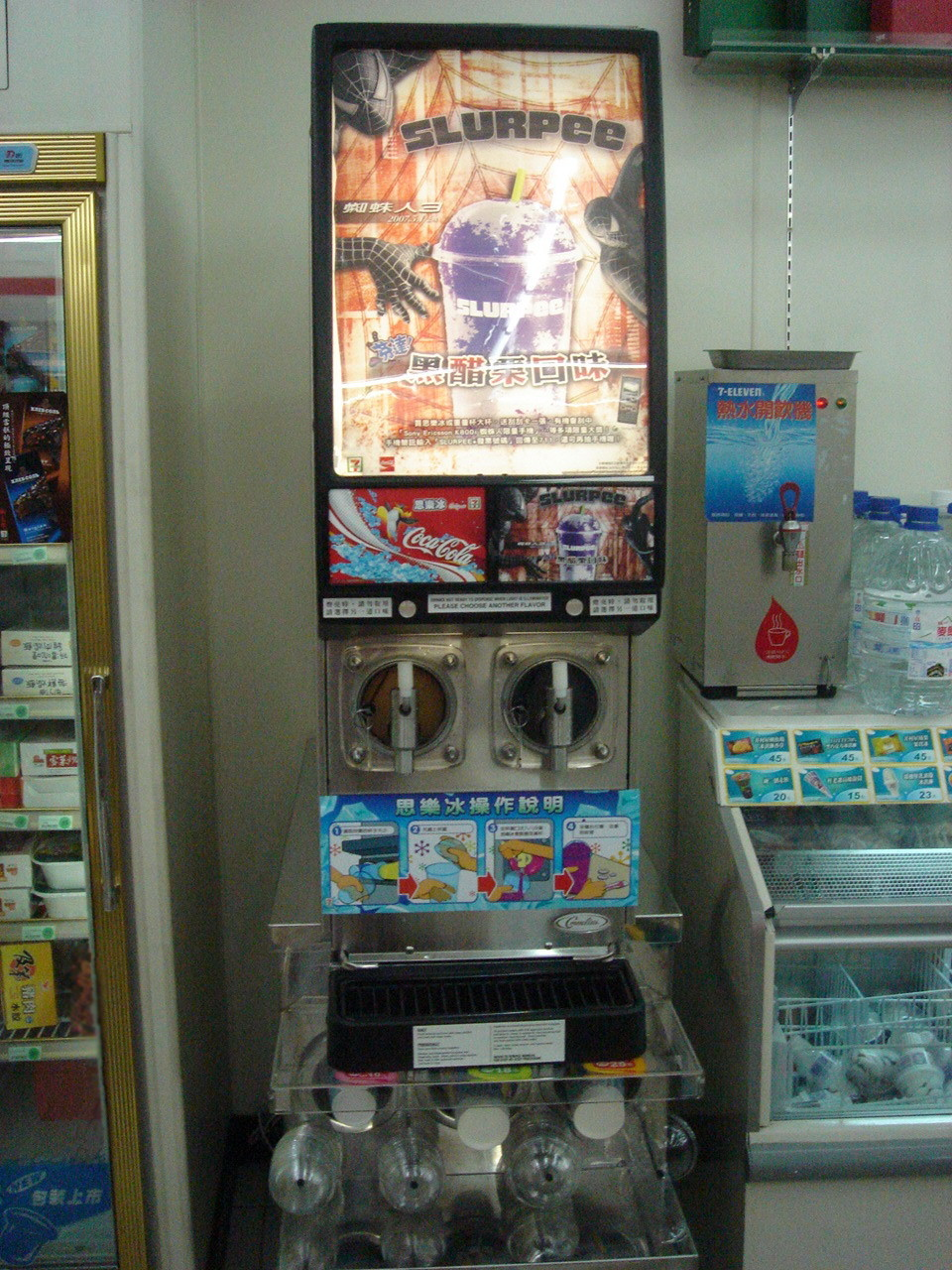
A Slurpee machine with two flavor barrels in a 7-Eleven store in Taiwan.

Slurpee is the brand name for carbonated slushies sold by 7-Eleven and its subsidiaries A-Plus, Speedway, & Stripes Convenience Stores. The brand originated in 1966 when 7-Eleven made a licensing deal with The Icee Company to sell slushies in 7-Eleven stores.

== History ==
Omar Knedlik invented machines to make frozen beverages in the late 1950s. The idea for a slushed ice drink came when Knedlik's soda fountain broke down, forcing him to put his sodas in a freezer to stay cool, which caused them to become slushy. The result was popular with customers, which gave him the idea to make a machine to help make a "slushy" from carbonated beverages. When it became popular, Knedlik hired an artist named Ruth E. Taylor to create a name and a logo for his invention. She created the Icee name and designed the original logo, which is still used today. Early prototypes for the machine made use of an automobile air conditioning unit.

After a successful trial of Icee machines in 100 stores, 7-Eleven made a licensing deal with The Icee Company to sell the product under certain conditions in 1965. Two of these were that 7-Eleven must use a different name for the product, and that the company was allowed to sell the product only in 7-Eleven locations in the US, a non-compete clause ensuring the two drinks never went head to head for distribution rights. 7-Eleven then sold the product that in 1966 became known as the "Slurpee" (for the sound made when drinking them). The term was coined by Bob Stanford, a 7-Eleven advertisement agency director.

The Slurpee machine has a separate spout, or spigot, for each flavor at the front of a tumbler or freezer. When Slurpees were first introduced, the dispensing machine was located behind the counter, and the clerk dispensed the product. Common Slurpee flavors are frozen Cherry, Blue Raspberry, Coca-Cola, and Mountain Dew, but new flavors are introduced regularly. In the Slurpee's early history, flavors rotated much more frequently than today. Slurpee flavors were given novelty names such as Pink Fink, Adults Only, Moonshine, Kissin' Cousin, Gully Washer, Sticky Icky, and Redeye.

In 1990, Dallas-based Southland Corporation, 7-Eleven's founder and US operator, went bankrupt, but 7-Eleven Japan, and its parent Ito-Yokado, bought 70% of Southland in 1991 for $430 million and quickly launched renovations of the US stores. As a result, the US chains became more efficient, although 1,218 stores were closed. Following the Japanese model, the new 7-Eleven stores set up a weekly system to monitor inventories to ensure popular items are always in stock.

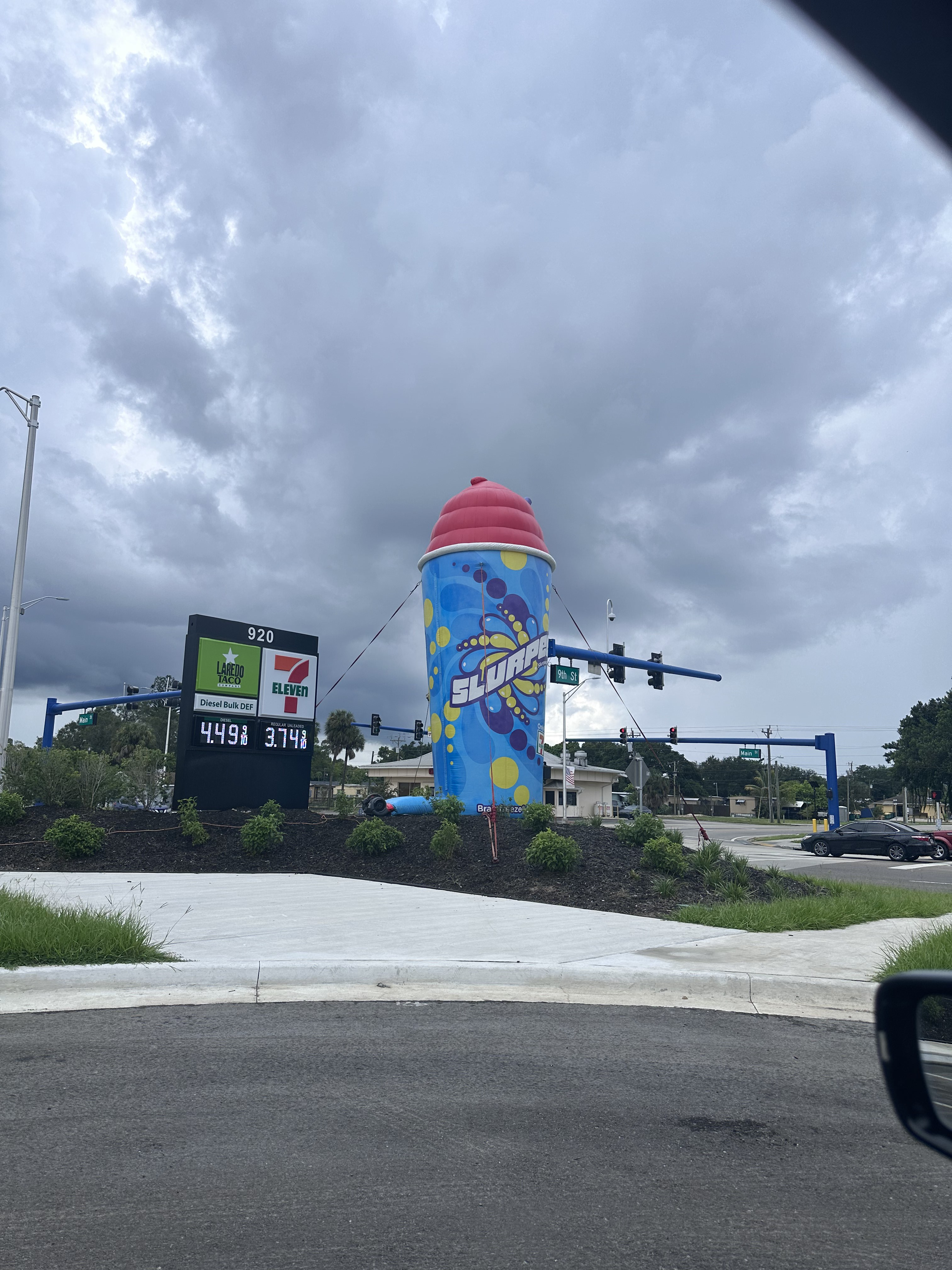
A Slurpee Inflatable

Following their respective acquisitions by 7-Eleven, A-Plus and Speedway both started selling Slurpee-branded drinks prior to their conversion to 7-Eleven. Many fans of Speedway's own frozen drink, Speedy Freeze, complained on social media about the drink being replaced by Slurpee-branded products, although other frozen drink fans have said the two drinks are identical.

== Worldwide consumption ==
More than 11.6 million Slurpee drinks are consumed around the world each day. Forty percent of Slurpees are sold during June, July and August. Enough drinks are sold each year to fill 12 Olympic-sized swimming pools. Canadians purchase an average of 30 million Slurpee drinks per year. Winnipeg was crowned the Slurpee Capital of the World for the twenty-sixth year in a row in 2025. 7-Eleven stores across Winnipeg sell an average of 188,833 Slurpee drinks per month. The rest of Canada sells an average of 179,700 per month, which makes Winnipeggers the world leader of Slurpee sales. Unlike their counterparts in America, Canadian Slurpees do not contain yucca extract which gives it the airy consistency American Slurpees are known for. 6.6 million Slurpee drinks are sold in Australia each year.

== Kosher status ==
The Diet Pepsi flavor uses sodium caseinate as an anti-freezing agent (sugar is a natural antifreeze in other flavors) which gives it the status of kosher dairy. The Chicago Rabbinical Council keeps an updated list of kosher flavors on its website.

== Promotions ==
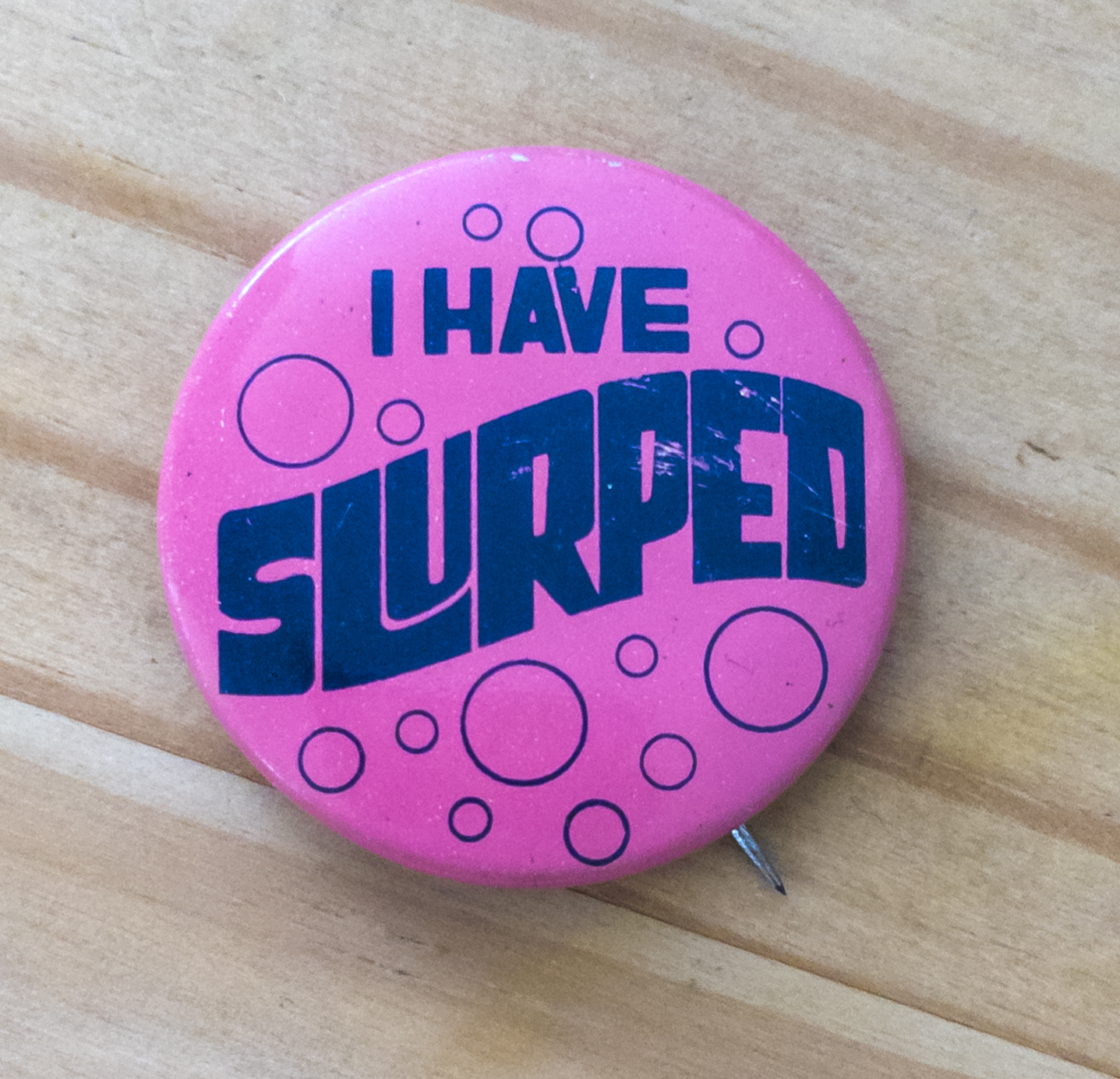
A promotional "I Have Slurped" badge from 1967.

In 1965–66, Icee transitioned to Slurpee in 7-Eleven stores and sales. By the spring of 1967, Slurpee machines were in all 7-Eleven stores.

In 1967, Top 40 AM radio stations were losing market share to FM stations. DJs were desperate to gain audience attention. Slurpee was a kid / teen / young adult product, the main AM radio audience. The Stanford Agency created a "media blitz" to launch Slurpee and flew agency staff to all Top 40 markets with 7-Eleven stores to introduce Slurpee and the comedy commercials with funny voices and sound effects that told stories about the Strange Things That Happened To People Who Slurp. The agency backed the Slurpee launch with a very large media budget. DJs used "drops" or snippets from the "crazy" commercials in their programs to gain audience share. The campaign became an AM radio sensation.

The Stanford Agency followed the Strange Things launch with a campaign that threw away product names like lemon-lime, cola, grape, or other conventional descriptions, and instead created 26-weeks of :60 second commercials about Slurpees with Funny Names like Sticky Icky, Redeye, Moon Shine, Pink Fink, Adults Only, Kissin Cousin, and Gully Washer. These commercials were even more popular. Each flavor had a pin associated with it. There were pins made for the flavors. There was also a generic pin that simply stated "I have Slurped".

In 1968, the Official Slurp Hat was offered.

In 1970, 7-Eleven released a 45 RPM 7" single record entitled "Dance the Slurp" that was given away with Slurpee purchases. The dance side was written by Tom Merriman, one of the fathers of radio jingle production. The B-side was a comedy bit detailing "strange things" that happen to people who "slurp" at 7-Eleven. The record is considered highly collectible today. In 1999, "Dance the Slurp" was sampled by DJ Shadow and Cut Chemist for their mix album Brainfreeze.

Slurpee became the top selling 7-Eleven product and kids / teens / young adults came in regularly for the latest "flavor" with less and less promotional expense. After Funny Names, the next innovation was Slurpee Cups.

In 1972, Baseball Slurpee Cups, plastic cups with illustrations of favorite players including Johnny Bench, Pete Rose and others. The cups became sought-after collectables.

In 1973, Baseball Slurpee Cups, with illustrations of current stars and early players like Honus Wagner.

In 1973, the DC Comics Super Hero Cups, a 60 cup series.

In 1973, a set of NBA trading cups was introduced.

In 1973, a set of World Hockey Association (WHA) cups was introduced. There were 20 cups in the set. The cups were only distributed in Candian cities that had WHA teams.

In 1983, a series of baseball trading coins was introduced. The coins were given out until 2000. 7-11 partnered with the Score company for this promotion. The final set had only 10 coins.

1973 Endangered Species Cups – Congress passed the Endangered Species Act (ESA) on December 14, 1973. This triggered 7-Eleven making an advanced of $250,000 representing 1-cent from the sale of more than 2-million Endangered Species Cups to the National Wildlife Federation (NWF) who purchased Bald Eagle habitat. The transfer of land to the U.S. Government and U.S. Fish and Wildlife Service took place on December 19, 1974, and came to be known as the Carl E. Mundt National Wildlife Refuge.

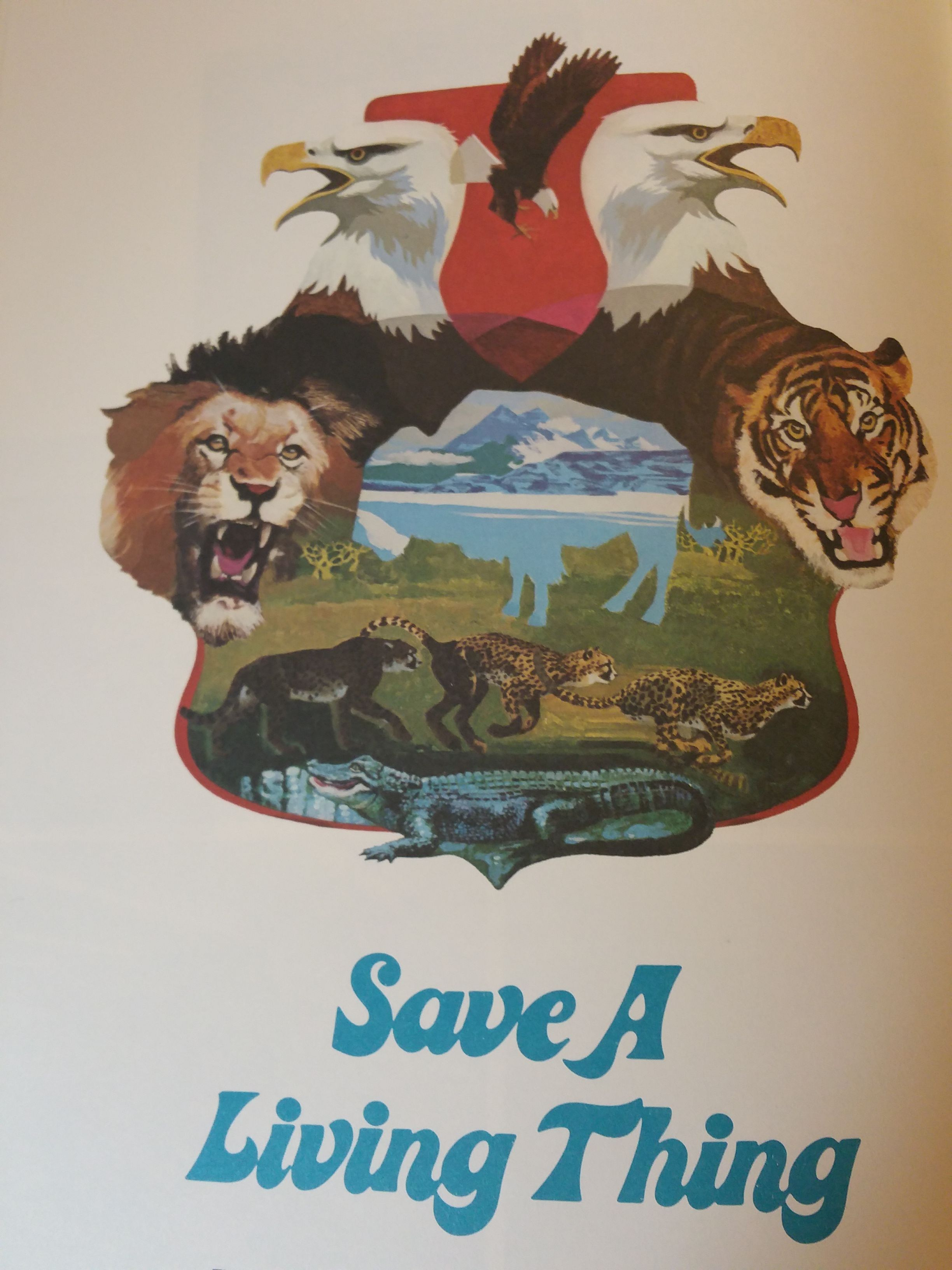
"Save A Living Thing" Endangered Species Slurpee cup promotion. Internal report image.

In 1975, there was the Marvel Series, a 60-cup series, and in 1977, the Marvel "Panoramic" Super Hero series.

In 1994, 7-Eleven sought to remake Slurpee's "brain freeze" campaign targeted to the adolescent MTV audience. The creative directors assigned the task of creating four new commercials to the Brothers Quay, and Boston-based Olive Jar Animation. Known for their bizarre aesthetic and influence in the stop-motion animations industry, the Quays based their "brain freeze" ad on a late 19th-century photograph of a female contortionist. In the commercial, a curtain reveals the contortionist balancing on two chairs, bending over backward to sip a Slurpee. She falls victim to "brain freeze" and turns into an ice cube.

Beginning in 1995, free Slurpee coupons have been made available through "Operation Chill" for US police officers to distribute to children.

In 1998, 7-Eleven launched Slurpee lip balm to the market. Other "Slurpee-flavored" products have included Slurpee gum, which had a liquid candy center.

In 2002, The World Wrestling Federation launched promotional cups featuring The Rock, Rob Van Dam, Lita with The Hardy Boyz, Stone Cold Steve Austin, Kurt Angle, Undertaker and Trish Stratus. The designs were on 40-ounce Slurpee cups and 34-ounce thermal mugs.

In 2004, 7-Eleven created an edible Slurpee straw.

In 2005, 7-Eleven promoted the film Star Wars Episode III: Revenge of the Sith, by making a Mountain Dew Pitch Black "Dark Side" Slurpee which came in a cup shaped like Darth Vader's helmet.

In 2007, as part of the Kwik-E-Mart promotion for the feature film The Simpsons Movie, Slurpees at 7-Elevens were renamed "Squishees" (the analog in the Simpsons universe) and sold in special collector cups.

Starting on November 4, 2008, 7-Eleven worked with Nexon to promote Slurpees to gamers that play on Nexon.net. The Slurpee cups had images printed on them from certain Nexon games, and a code printed on them that could be redeemed on a website for special in-game items.

Also for professional wrestling WWE's Summerslam 2010 7-Eleven offered collectible Slurpee cups of Rey Mysterio, John Cena, The Undertaker, Triple H, and Kelly Kelly. They also came with collectible straws with figures of each wrestler on them. The flavor used for the promotion was Barq's Root Beer. As well as for the 2011 SummerSlam, which again featured Cena, The Miz, 2009 WWE Hall of Famer "Stone Cold" Steve Austin, and The Rock. The flavor used for the promotion was Fanta's Berry Citrus Slam.

Every year on July 11 (7/11, month/day), 7-Eleven offered a free 7.11 fluid ounce (210 ml) Slurpee in the US and Canada thru 2014. From 2015 to 2019 & since 2021, the size increased to a 12-fluid ounce (355 ml) size. 7 Rewards members are given a free medium Slurpee loaded into their app in 2020, with the COVID-19 pandemic causing 7-11 Day's cancellation that year.

In Australia, free Slurpees are given on November 7 (7/11, day/month) to coincide with 7-Eleven day.

In 2010, 7-Eleven teamed up with Sony to create limited edition promotion cups for the PlayStation 3 games LittleBigPlanet 2 and Killzone 3. In 2011, a Slurpee themed t-shirt was added as DLC to LittleBigPlanet 2.

Since July 7, 2011, 7-Eleven has partnered with Cinemark Theatres marking the first time Slurpees are sold outside its parent franchise. 32 theatres were chosen in Houston, Texas; Dallas, Texas; and Portland, Oregon. This marks the first reappearance of the Slurpee brand in the Houston metro area since 1990 (all 7-Elevens in the Houston area were sold to National Convenience Stores that owned Stop-n-Go; all Houston-area 7-Elevens were rebranded as Stop-n-Gos until Diamond Shamrock acquired the franchise in the late 1990s, now part of the Valero conglomerate of crude oil refineries and retail convenience stores most commonly operated under the Valero brand with generic names, though some Texas-area stores retained Corner Store branding held over from the Valero purchase of Ultramar Diamond Shamrock in 2001).

2012 had the Slurpee being sold at the Six Flags amusement parks chain in a marketing agreement to promote the product in 10 states.

In Australia on September 21, 2011, customers could bring in their own cups (or container, regardless of size) and fill it full of Slurpee for only $2.60 (a portion of the price of a Super Slurpee) as long as it would fit through a cutout hole limiting the size. This did not stop people from receiving up to and above 5 liters of Slurpee for less than the price of a Super Slurpee. This event was known as Bring Your Own Cup Day.

Since April 11, 2015, Bring Your Own Cup Day in U.S locations originally occurred once annually since 2022; semi-annually from 2016 to 2017. Slurpee fans could come in and enjoy any size cup, that fit through the cutout hole, for only $1.49 the first 2 years. This promotion occurred again on August 19–20, 2016 in honor of the Slurpee's 50th anniversary. It returned on May 19–20, 2017, but the price was $1.50 plus tax, and returned once more on August 18–19. Late August 2022 saw its return, but is priced at $1.99 plus tax. There was no Bring Your Own Cup Day promotion in 2020-21.

On November 7, 2015, 7-Eleven stores in the USA celebrated the giving season with Name Your Own Price Day for Small Slurpee drinks. Net proceeds from all Large Slurpee purchases were donated to Feeding America to support local food banks.

Since May 2018, as a result of the 7-Eleven - Sunoco LP agreement, existing Stripes Convenience Stores (now part of the 7-Eleven business portfolio) rebranded its Slush Monkey frozen beverage to the Slurpee brand.

On April 30, 2025, 7-Eleven released the Kerplunk Kandy Grape Slurpee, as part of 7-Eleven and Punk Bunny Coffee’s partnership. This release included a promotional cup and straw.

== See also ==
- Big Gulp
- Freezee
- Froster
- Frozen carbonated beverage
- Italian ice
- List of frozen dessert brands
- Pumpable ice technology
- Slush Puppie
