= Punk Bunny Coffee =

American coffee company founded by Green Day

- Company type: Private
- Industry: Packaged Coffee
- Founded: 2023; 3 years ago Brecksville, Ohio
- Founders: Billie Joe Armstrong; Mike Dirnt; Tré Cool
- Headquarters: 6100 W Snowville Rd., Brecksville, Ohio
- Products: Coffee beans, coffee beverages
- Owner: Green Day
- Website: https://www.punkbunnycoffee.com/

Punk Bunny Coffee is a coffee company launched in May 2024 by Billie Joe Armstrong, Tré Cool, and Mike Dirnt of the American punk rock band Green Day. The band previously created Oakland Coffee Works, based in Oakland, California.

Punk Bunny Coffee sells certified organic and Fair Trade pre-packaged coffee. The company also released a limited run of Hot Cocoa in November 2024. Investors in Punk Bunny Coffee include Rachel Ray and Adam Devine.

Upon their launch in 2024, the brand announced that they would be partnering with Keurig Dr. Pepper to pack Punk Bunny Coffee roasts in Keurig K-cup® pods. In September 2024, the two brands co-released a special edition Punk Bunny x Keurig-brewer.

Starting in August 2024, Punk Bunny Coffee started partnering with 7-Eleven to sell its products. This included Speedway and Stripes locations in addition to standard 7-Eleven locations, and included both fresh brew at the store as well as take home coffee grounds and K-cups.

Since June 2024, Punk Bunny Coffee has released two limited-edition items with UK-based coffee company, Grind Coffee. The releases included a ready-to-drink canned iced matcha latte and an American Idiot-inspired collector's edition coffee tin.

LAFC, the Los Angeles Football Club, announced in September 2024 that Punk Bunny Coffee will be the soccer club's official coffee partner for the 2025 season. The partnership will see a "custom portable coffee stand" and "co-branded LAFC x PBC coffee cans" to BMO Stadium and participating 7-Eleven stores.

In December 2024, Punk Bunny Coffee and TBS collaborated to release a limited-edition roast celebrating TBS's fan-favorite animated show, American Dad!. The roast, Good Morning, USA, was named after the show's theme song of the same title.

On April 30, 2025, Punk Bunny Coffee and 7-Eleven released new products in their partnership, the Kerplunk Kandy Grape Slurpee, along with a limited edition cup and straw. They also released three new coffee flavors: Mike Dirnt's Turn Up the Bass Medium Roast, Punk Bunny Cold Brew Caramel Latte, and Chocolate Almond Specialty Latte.
