= Big Gulp =

Fountain drink brand owned by 7-Eleven

- Big Gulp translite at a Speedway on Neville Island in Pittsburgh, Pennsylvania, United States in 2022.
- Type: Fountain drink
- Manufacturer: 7-Eleven, A-Plus, Speedway, Stripes Convenience Stores
- Distributor: 7-Eleven
- Country of origin: United States
- Introduced: 1976
- Website: www.7-eleven.com/products/big-gulp

Big Gulp is a line of fountain drinks owned by 7-Eleven and used at its namesake stores as well as A-Plus, Speedway, and Stripes Convenience Stores. While the name is in reference to the original 32-US-fluid-ounce (950 ml) drink, it has since expanded to include various other sizes.

== History ==
The Big Gulp was introduced in 1976 by Dennis Potts, the merchandise manager for 7-Eleven in the Southern California market in the 1970s. Wanting to help lagging sales at the stores, The Coca-Cola Company suggested to Potts that they use a then-unheard of 32 ounce cup (940 ml) for their drinks. At the time, the average Coca-Cola bottle contained 16-US-fluid-ounce (470 ml), while the largest fountain drink available was at McDonald's at 20-US-fluid-ounce (590 ml).

Despite Potts's objections, he agreed to send a case of 500 cups to a 7-Eleven location in Orange County. Much to his surprise, the store sold out of the cups within a week, prompting 7-Eleven to expand the Big Gulp line nationwide. Shortly after the initial rollout of the Big Gulp, 7-Eleven changed suppliers and went from using cups that mimicked milk cartons to the current circular design, eventually forcing automakers to change the design of cupholders due to the Big Gulp's success.

7-Eleven commissioned the Sanford Advertising Agency which came up with its name and tag line “7-Eleven’s Big Gulp gives you another kind of freedom: Freedom of choice.”. Called Big Gulp because it was initially the largest such drink available at any retailer, 7-Eleven eventually introduced larger sizes. In 1986, they introduced the 44-US-fluid-ounce (1,300 ml) Super Big Gulp, followed by the 64-US-fluid-ounce (1,900 ml) Double Gulp in 1989 (later reduced to 50-US-fluid-ounce (1,500 ml)), and eventually as limited time offerings the X-Treme Gulp and Team Gulp. Conversely, 7-Eleven also introduced the Lil' Big Gulp (originally simply called Gulp), which stands at 22-US-fluid-ounce (650 ml). At 128-US-fluid-ounce (3,800 ml), the Team Gulp remains the largest fountain offering in the world.

Much like the Big Gulp's sister Slurpee line, the Big Gulp was originally served behind the counter by 7-Eleven employees. However, by the mid-1980s fountain machines were placed on the main sales floor and offered as a self-service option, making the Big Gulp line the first self-service fountain drink, something that would become the industry standard by the 1990s.

Following the acquisition of rival chains such as A-Plus, Speedway, and Stripes, 7-Eleven introduced the Big Gulp line at those stores in a mostly cosmetic change, as the Big Gulp cups replaced those stores' existing fountain cups.

== Sizes ==
Name	Capacity (Note: At introduction, some sizes were changed later, see History for details.)
Gulp	22-US-fluid-ounce (650 ml)
Big Gulp	32-US-fluid-ounce (950 ml)
Super Big Gulp	44-US-fluid-ounce (1,300 ml)
X-Treme Gulp	52-US-fluid-ounce (1,500 ml)
Double Gulp	64-US-fluid-ounce (1,900 ml)
Team Gulp	128-US-fluid-ounce (3,800 ml)

== Controversy ==
As the launch of the Big Gulp line coincided with the onset of the obesity epidemic in the United States, 7-Eleven and other retailers that have similar fountain lines such as rival Circle K's Polar Pop line have received criticism over their size and enabling obesity. 7-Eleven has been so associated with such large drinks that Michael Bloomberg's proposed ban on large sodas in New York City was frequently referred to as the 'Big Gulp ban'.

While the proposal was never enacted, perhaps in response to the proposal 7-Eleven began phasing out the Big Gulp name in North America to generic 7-Eleven branded cups and sizes, with the Big Gulp name being minimized to the bar code on the cups denoting a fountain drink as opposed to a Slurpee or an iced coffee. This was eventually reversed due to 7-Eleven's acquisitions of Stripes and Speedway and wanting a universal cup design for the stores.
