= GetGo =

American convenience store chain

- A typical GetGo location in Rochester, Pennsylvania (Originally a SuperAmerica)
- Formerly: Cross Roads (1985–1995); Giant Eagle Fuel (1995–2003)
- Type: Subsidiary
- Industry: Convenience stores Fast food Gas stations
- Founded: 1985; 41 years ago
- Headquarters: O'Hara Township, Pennsylvania, United States, U.S.
- Number of locations: 277 (2023)
- Areas served: Indiana, Maryland, Ohio, Pennsylvania, and West Virginia.
- Key people: Bart Friedman; (Executive Chairman, Giant Eagle); Bill Artman; (CEO, Giant Eagle); Terri Micklin; (Executive VP, Giant Eagle; President, GetGo)
- Products: Prepared foods, coffee, motor vehicle fuel, beer and wine
- Services: GetGo Kitchen, WetGo Car Wash
- Parent: Alimentation Couche-Tard
- Website: www.getgocafe.com

GetGo, also known as GetGo Cafe & Market, is a convenience store chain owned and operated by Alimentation Couche-Tard as a separate business unit from Circle K. Headquartered in suburban Pittsburgh, it shares its headquarters with its former parent, supermarket chain Giant Eagle. The chain operates locations in Indiana, Maryland, Ohio, Pennsylvania, and West Virginia.

== History ==
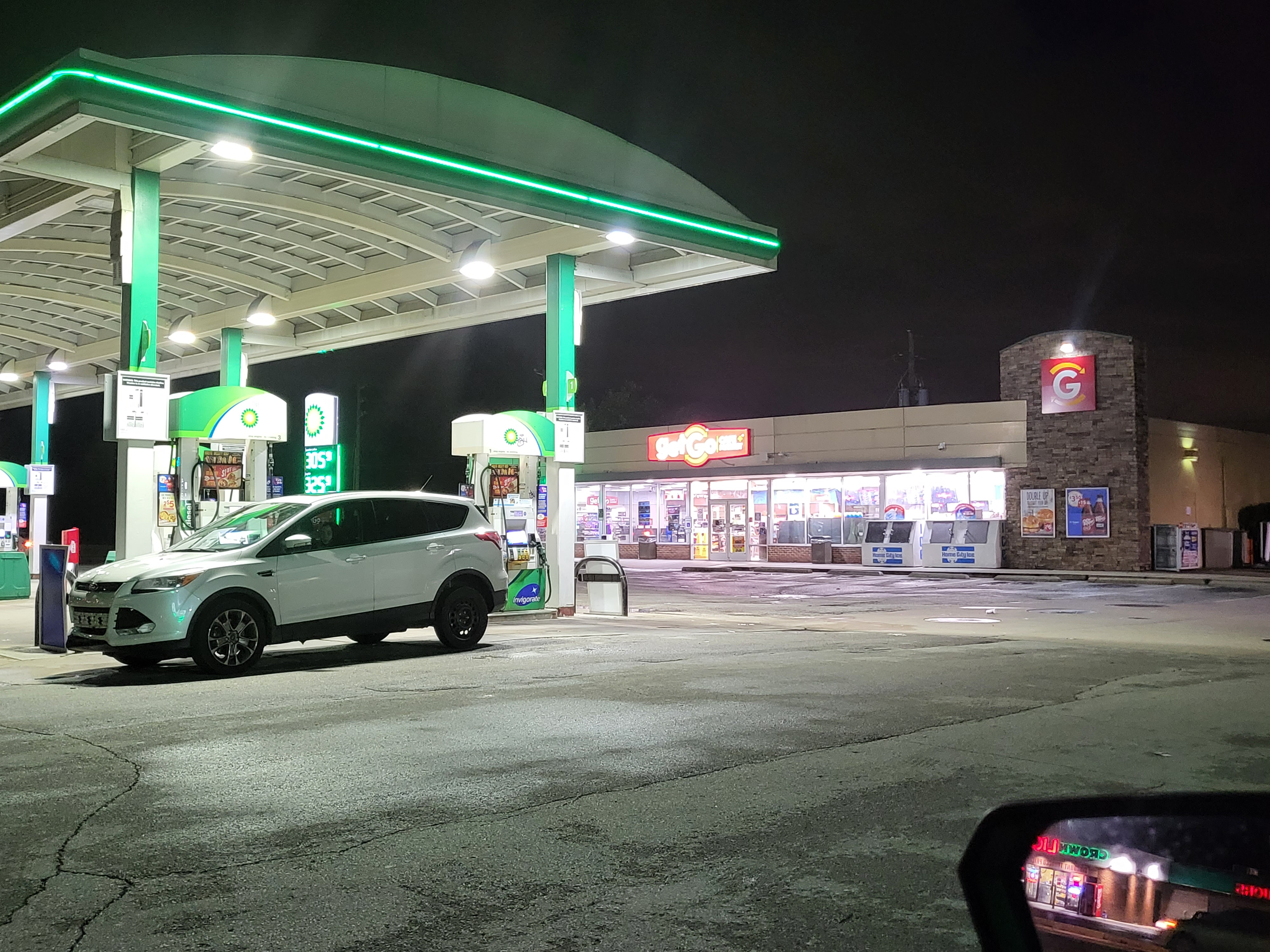
A GetGo location in Indianapolis, selling BP fuel instead of GetGo-branded fuel.

GetGo initially opened in 1985 as the convenience store chain Cross Roads, which was the retail brand of Guttman Oil Company based in nearby Belle Vernon, Pennsylvania. The chain had a presence throughout the Pittsburgh metropolitan area, primarily competing with 7-Eleven, Sheetz, and several local chains.

Meanwhile, in 1995 local supermarket chain Giant Eagle opened a gas station at a Giant Eagle location in Youngstown, Ohio branded as "Giant Eagle Fuel", expanding on this extensively in 2001. This was in line with most other major supermarket chains in the early 2000s that began opening up gas stations at supermarkets, alongside big-box chains Walmart & Kmart, as well as warehouse club chains like Costco and Sam's Club. Like most such concepts, Giant Eagle Fuel stations only sold gasoline.

In late 2003, Giant Eagle agreed to buy most of the Cross Roads stations from Guttman Oil, which also happen to supply the Giant Eagle Fuel stations as a jobber. The combined chains took the GetGo name (Giant Eagle + Guttman Oil), although a small handful of the Cross Roads stations still bear the name. This also had the effect of giving some stations a considerable distance from a main Giant Eagle location. Shortly afterward, Giant Eagle bought some gas stations from Shell in Ohio that were near existing Giant Eagle locations to give the GetGo chain a footprint in major Giant Eagle markets in Ohio such as Columbus, Cleveland, Akron/Canton, and Youngstown. In one instance, Giant Eagle acquired a 7-Eleven from Marathon Petroleum that had previously been a SuperAmerica and briefly a Speedway before Marathon temporarily withdrew Speedway from Pennsylvania and planned on selling the location to a 7-Eleven franchisee before it was purchased for GetGo; notably, this happened years before 7-Eleven purchased Speedway outright from Marathon.

Following these acquisitions, most GetGo's have been built from the ground up by Giant Eagle. Guttman Oil continues to supply GetGo today, initially having had an ownership stake in GetGo, but sold this stake to Giant Eagle in 2005, making GetGo a wholly owned subsidiary of Giant Eagle.

Since gaining 100% control of GetGo, all GetGo locations are owned and operated by Giant Eagle, unlike the parent chain which has several older privately owned locations; GetGo's that are at independently owned Giant Eagle locations are owned and operated by Giant Eagle itself, not the franchisee.

In 2015, GetGo began to open up several more locations in its home market in response to a similar expansion plan by its main rival Sheetz as well as an organic expansion into the area by Speedway. The new locations, which required a mass hiring blitz in the Pittsburgh area, are larger and in some cases sell alcohol, which in Pennsylvania requires special canopies built underneath the pumps just for gas sales. The move coincided with Giant Eagle's expansion into the Indianapolis market with its Market District brand, including GetGo.

=== Sale to Alimentation Couche-Tard ===
In August 2024, Giant Eagle entered an agreement with Alimentation Couche-Tard, the parent company of Circle K, to purchase GetGo for an undisclosed sum. Giant Eagle's myPerks rewards program will continue to be offered by GetGo after the sale. The Federal Trade Commission signed off on the deal on June 26, 2025, with Georgia-based Majors Management (doing business as Hop In convenience stores) purchasing 34 Circle K and one GetGo location to satisfy antitrust concerns. Majors Management plans to rebrand the locations under the MAPCO brand. Most of the divested stores were in the Indianapolis and Akron markets, with singular location divestures in Columbus (in Carroll, Ohio near Lancaster) and Pittsburgh (in Washington, Pennsylvania), with the divested stores also forced to stop carrying the Lawson's chip dip since its a private label brand of Circle K.

GetGo will remain headquartered at Giant Eagle's headquarters in Cranberry Township as opposed to Circle K's headquarters in Tempe, Arizona or its Great Lakes offices at the former headquarters of Holland Oil in Akron, Ohio but will lease separate space from Giant Eagle. GetGo will be considered a separate business unit from Circle K as opposed to being merged into its Great Lakes division. The GetGo brand name is also expected to continue at least in the short-term despite Couche-Tard's ongoing efforts to rebrand its Minnesota-based Holiday Stationstores as Circle K. The deal closed June 29, 2025.

Despite being a separate entity within Couche-Tard from Circle K, within hours of the deal being finalized GetGo's careers website was redirected to Circle K's careers website, with GetGo having the byline "GetGo is part of the Circle K family of stores!". Following the finalization of the deal, GetGo joined Circle K's Great Lakes division in carrying Lawson's chip dip.

=== Ricker's ===
Ricker Oil Co.
- Trade name: Ricker's
- Type: Subsidiary
- Industry: Retail (convenience store)
- Founded: 1979; 47 years ago
- Founder: Jay Ricker; Nancy Ricker
- Defunct: September 27, 2018; 8 years ago (as an independent company); January 2020; 6 years ago (official)
- Fate: Acquired by Giant Eagle, brand name dissolved
- Headquarters: Anderson, Indiana, U.S.
- Number of locations: 56 (2021)
- Key people: Jay Ricker, President
- Parent: Independent (1979–2018); Giant Eagle

Ricker's was a chain of convenience stores operating in Anderson, Indiana. Founded by Jay and Nancy Ricker in 1979, the chain grew to 56 stores across Indiana.

On September 27, 2018, Giant Eagle announced it would purchase the 56-store Ricker's convenience store chain in Indiana, marking the largest acquisition for GetGo since the chain's launch. No immediate changes were planned for the Ricker's chain. Much as it has done in Pennsylvania alongside Sheetz, GetGo plans to join Ricker's in having Indiana change their laws regarding alcohol sales. By January 2020, all Ricker's locations were converted to GetGo.

== Format ==
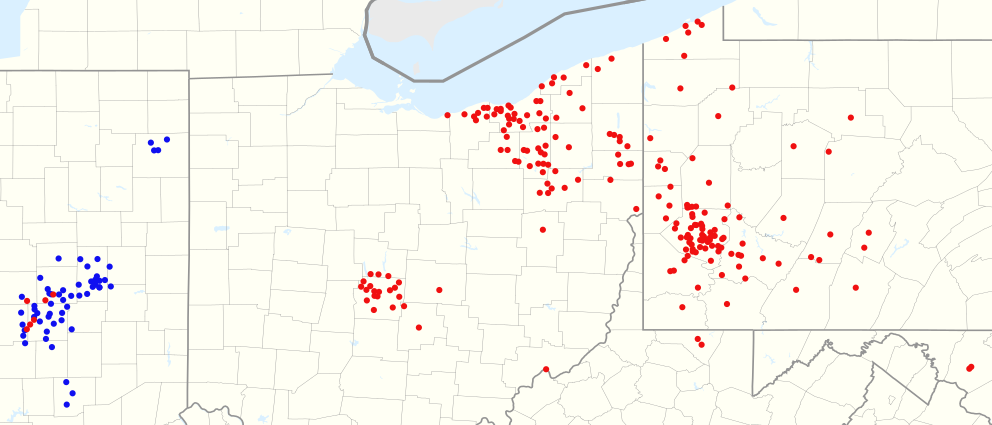
GetGo locations footprint as of January 2021. (Former Ricker's in blue)

The GetGo concept is different from other "gas station at supermarket" concepts in that Giant Eagle was able to give the chain its own identity and become a full-fledged convenience store/gas station chain. This is unlike most other supermarket chains, which have largely kept the gas stations strictly selling gas and under a generic identity, like Giant Eagle once had with the "Giant Eagle Fuel" concept.

To compete with other local convenience store chains, Giant Eagle has instituted the Fuelperks! program, in which customers are rewarded by saving $0.10 per gallon ($0.20 in select markets) they buy on a fill-up with every $50 they spend in Giant Eagle using their Advantage Card. Some GetGo locations also have a WetGo automatic car wash.

GetGo's main rival in Pittsburgh is Sheetz, which is headquartered in Altoona. The chain also competes with 7-Eleven/Speedway/A-Plus, Country Fair, and the locally owned Coen Markets in the Pittsburgh market, as well as competing with Sheetz & Speedway in both Cleveland and Columbus, while also competing with United Dairy Farmers, Turkey Hill/Certified, and the locally owned Duchess Shoppe in Columbus. There are two GetGo locations in West Virginia (in Morgantown) and three in Maryland (in Frederick). In all markets except in Maryland, it also competed with Circle K prior to becoming sister chains under Couche-Tard.

In 2007, Giant Eagle released the Giant Eagle Fuelperks! Credit Card in its Columbus Market. The Columbus Market was chosen for the pilot. It has extra incentives such as earning an additional 4 cents off per gallon for every $50 you charge onto your Fuelperks! credit card and earn an additional 4 cents off per gallon for every $100 in GetGo fuel purchases.

In late 2008, Giant Eagle and Citizens Financial Group (which already had Citizens Bank locations inside Pennsylvania Giant Eagle locations) launched a program in which Citizens Bank debit card holders earned an additional $.1 off/gallon in Fuelperks! for every $50 spent anywhere when their Citizens Bank debit card was used. In addition, Citizens cardholders earned an extra $.3 off/gallon when used at Giant Eagle in addition to the $.10 off already earned there. The program is only open to new or existing Citizens Bank customers with a checking account and a Giant Eagle Advantage Card, and must have the debit card synced with the Advantage Card at Citizens branches before it can be used for additional Fuelperks!.

In April 2009, GetGo launched the Foodperks! program, which in effect is the exact opposite of the Fuelperks! program in that anyone who uses their Giant Eagle Advantage Card, for every ten gallons purchased at GetGo receives 1% off on groceries at the parent chain. Up to 20% off can be used at one time, and up to $60 ($300 worth of groceries) is redeemable under the Foodperks! program, leaving the remainder for a future order. The program was launched in other markets after the Columbus market was used as a test market for the program in Fall 2008. Soon after, it was introduced to the Pittsburgh and Cleveland markets. In February 2013, Giant Eagle announced that they would be discontinuing the Foodperks! program that month because it was "a little too complex".

=== Food service ===
Many GetGo locations have a GetGo Kitchen, which is modeled after rival Sheetz and utilizes a touchscreen ordering method. Initially, GetGo Kitchen locations were a carryover from Cross Roads, as some of their locations had Yum! Brands express concepts with Taco Bell and Pizza Hut Express locations and their kitchens were simply utilized for GetGo's own proprietary food service concept. Due to size limitations, GetGo Kitchen locations were not installed at GetGo locations located outside main Giant Eagle locations. Since 2011, emphasis has been placed on GetGo Kitchen sites and their food has rivaled that of Sheetz, with all newly built locations since 2011 having a GetGo Kitchen. All of the former Ricker's locations also had a GetGo Kitchen open up to replace Ricker's own food offerings, and Giant Eagle's only Giant Eagle Express location in Harmar Township have a GetGo Kitchen alongside GetGo fuel.

=== Fuel sales ===
Under the Cross Roads banner, the chain sold its own brand of gasoline at some locations while others were cobranded with Texaco and later Citgo.

Upon the merging of the Cross Roads chain and the "Giant Eagle Fuel" sites into GetGo, all fueling locations now sold fuel under the GetGo banner without being cobranded with a Big Oil brand. For the most part, this has largely stayed the same to this day. Due to fueling contracts, the former Ricker's sites as well as a GetGo in Dublin, Ohio sell BP fuel.

=== WetGo ===
GetGo also offers over 40 locations with car washes called WetGo. Some of these sites, referred to as WetGo Pro, use a tunnel wash that guides vehicles through the tunnel where they are washed, rinsed, and dried. Other features include undercarriage washes, and hot wax. WetGo Pro sites also feature free vacuums and towels. In 2020, GetGo launched a subscription service for its car washes called WetGo Unlimited. Guests can sign up to get an unlimited number of washes of a tier they select for a flat monthly fee. In 2023, GetGo began opening Standalone WetGo sites.

== Headquarters ==
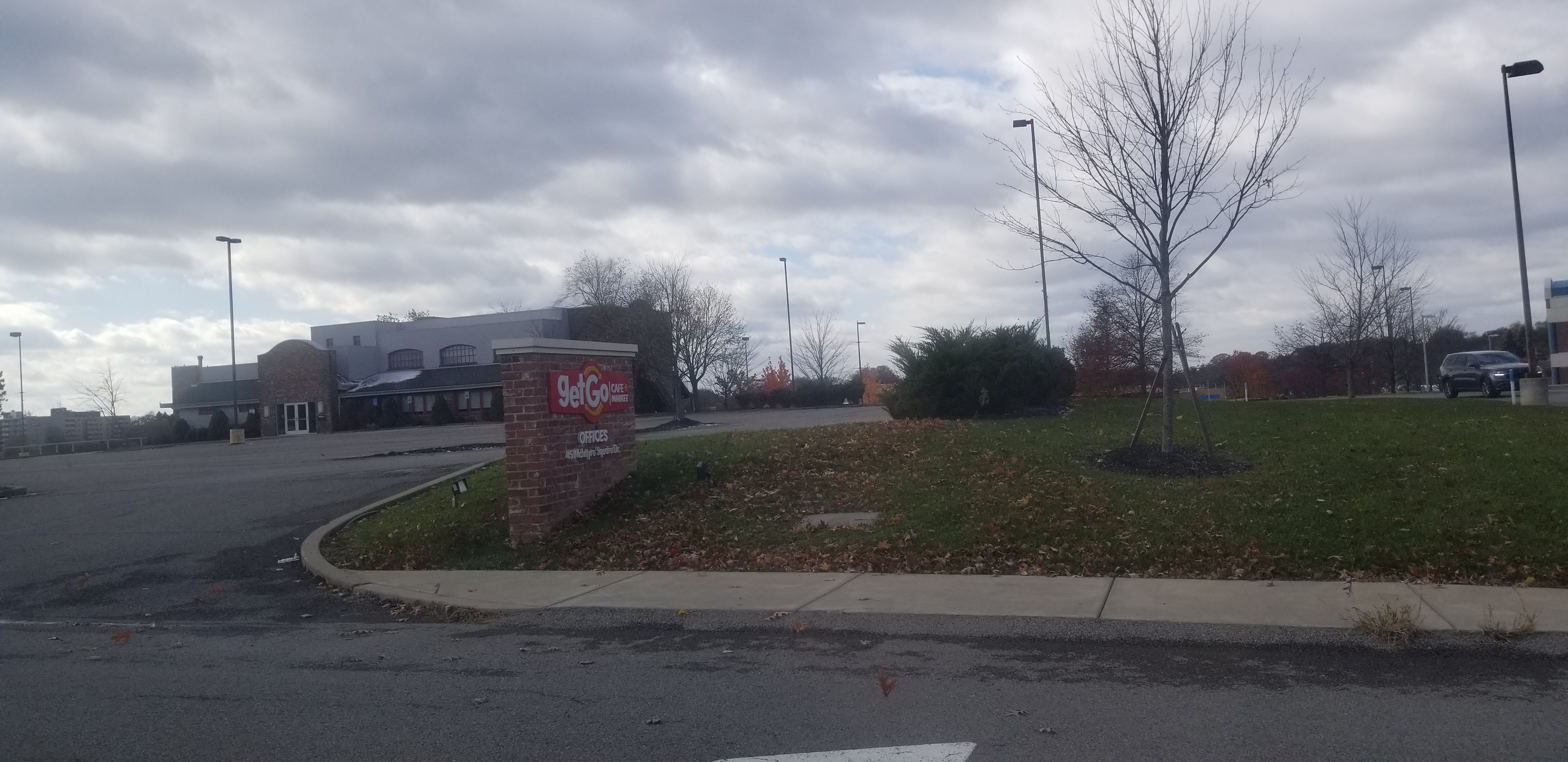
GetGo's former headquarters.

After initially being based out of Giant Eagle's headquarters in nearby O'Hara Township, in 2015 GetGo moved into its own headquarters and test kitchen at 45 McIntyre Square Drive. The office used to house Emiliano's Mexican Restaurant and was originally Don Pablo's. It was located across the street from the McIntyre Square Giant Eagle store and is on the Ross Township side of the Ross-McCandless border. Due to the pandemic, corporate team members began reporting remotely, and the office at McIntyre Square was closed in 2023. The test kitchen was moved to an existing Giant Eagle–owned warehouse in Pittsburgh.
