= Alvin New =

American politician (born 1963)

Alvin New (born 1963 in Brownfield, Texas) was the owner & CEO of Town & Country Food Stores and mayor of San Angelo, Texas.

== Early life and career ==
He was born in 1963 in Brownfield, Texas. He graduated from Pecos High School in 1981. He went on to attend and graduate from Angelo State University in 1985. He married his wife Patricia New in 1984. He began working at Town & Country Food Stores as a college junior and eventually worked his way up to Vice President. In 1999 he and five equal partners purchased the company, he became the managing owner and took on the title of CEO. In 2007 they sold the company to Susser Holdings, the holding corporation of Stripes Convenience Stores of Corpus Christi, Texas, for $368 million. He was designated as the new CEO of the combined corporations and briefly served as such before deciding against relocating his family and resigned shortly after the sale.

== Mayoral Election ==
On May 19, 2009 then current mayor J.W. Lown resigned shortly before taking the oath of office after being elected for his fourth term as mayor of San Angelo. A special election was then scheduled for November 2009. Out of the seven candidates running for the position Alvin New came in first however he was forced into a December 2009 runoff against then city councilman John David Fields whom he eventually defeated. On January 4, 2010 he was sworn in as the 42nd mayor of the city of San Angelo. He decided to not run for a third term and left office in June 2013.

== See also ==
- List of mayors of San Angelo, Texas
