= NTE =

NTE may refer to:

== Companies ==
- Nord-Trøndelag Elektrisitetsverk, a power company in Norway
- Northern Tier Energy, an energy company in the United States
- NTE Electronics, an electronic component supplier in the United States

== Science and technology ==
- Near-term extinction, the prospect of an imminent end of the human species
- Network termination equipment
- Negative thermal expansion, a physicochemical process
- Not-To-Exceed, a pollution emission standard

== Other ==
- National Teacher Examination, a past standardized test replaced by the Praxis test
- Neverness to Everness, a 2026 gacha video game
- Night-time economy, the economy made up of venues and industries such as bars and nightclubs
- IATA code of Nantes Atlantique Airport in Bouguenais, France
