= Rickers =

Rickers may refer to:-

- Jamie Rickers, British television presenter
- Paul Rickers, English soccer player
- Ricker's, convenience store chain, based in Indiana (United States), presently owned by GetGo
