= Northern Tier Energy =

Northern Tier Energy LP
- Company type: Public
- Traded as: NYSE: NTI
- Industry: Oil and gas
- Founded: 2010
- Fate: merged/dissolved with Western Refining, which is now part of andeavor
- Headquarters: Tempe, Arizona
- Key people: David L. Lamp, President and CEO
- Products: Gasoline and other petrochemicals
- Revenue: ▲US$ 5.56 billion (2014)
- Operating income: ▲US$ 275.3 million (2014)
- Net income: ▲US$ 241.6 million (2014)
- Total assets: ▲US$ 1.180 billion (2014)
- Number of employees: 2,950 (Dec 2014)
- Subsidiaries: SuperAmerica

Northern Tier Energy LP was an American downstream energy limited partnership. In addition to owning the SuperAmerica gas station and convenience store chain, it also owned an oil refinery in St. Paul Park, Minnesota and an interest in a pipeline. In 2014 it ranked 525 on the Fortune 1000.

== History ==
The company was created in 2010 when Acon Investments and TPG Capital acquired $554 million worth of assets from Marathon. Western Refining acquired a controlling interest in the company in 2013 for $775 million. By 2015, Western's ownership stake was 38% and it proposed in October to acquire the remainder of the company; it decided to dissolve Northern Tier early by buying all the shares and pay $860 million to close the deal on June 23, 2016.
