= Giant Industries =

Former oil refinery company

Giant Industries logo

Giant Industries (NYSE: GI) was an oil refinery company headquartered in Scottsdale, Arizona in the United States.

It owned three refineries, located at Bloomfield, New Mexico, Gallup, New Mexico, and Grafton, Virginia. Giant also owned a crude oil pipeline in New Mexico, a fleet of oil truck transports, and service stations in New Mexico, Colorado, and Arizona.

Giant Industries was acquired by Western Refining in 2007, which was acquired by Tesoro Corporation in 2017 to form Andeavor. In 2018, Andeavor was acquired by Marathon Petroleum. After the acquisition, the Giant brand was phased out and stores were converted to Marathon's now-former subsidiary, Speedway (Speedway was acquired by Seven & I Holdings, parent company of 7-Eleven, in 2021).
