= SuperAmerica =

Defunct Gas station chain

Coordinates: 44°56′24″N 92°57′19″W

- Type: Subsidiary
- Industry: Retail (convenience stores)
- Founded: 1960; 66 years ago
- Founder: Elmer Erickson
- Defunct: 2019; 7 years ago
- Fate: Rebranded as Speedway.
- Successor: 7-Eleven via Speedway
- Headquarters: Woodbury, Minnesota, United States
- Number of locations: 284 (2019); 1 (2019–present)
- Key people: David L. Lamp, President and CEO
- Parent: Marathon Petroleum
- Website: Archived official website at the Wayback Machine (archive index)

SuperAmerica was a chain of refined oil stations and convenience stores in the Upper Midwest, based in Woodbury, Minnesota. It was owned by Marathon Petroleum. The first convenience store opened in the 1960s. SuperAmerica had 284 stores with 271 in Minnesota, 11 in Wisconsin and 2 in South Dakota.

== History ==
SuperAmerica convenience stores first opened in 1960 in Saint Paul, Minnesota. They were first operated by Northwestern Refining of St. Paul Park, Minnesota. SuperAmerica operated stations primarily in Minnesota, but also a number of locations in western Wisconsin and eastern South Dakota. The chain formerly operated stores in Florida, but these were sold to Shell Oil in 1993.

Ashland Petroleum purchased Northwestern Refining and the SuperAmerica chain in the 1970s. Ashland had marketed full-service stations under its own "Ashland" brand. As self-service was legalized, it used the brands "Solo", "Save Mart", "Save More", and "Rich", along with others. Ashland converted most of its outlets in its core territory to "SuperAmerica", while withdrawing from Florida. It maintained a few outlets under its other brand names to keep the trademarks valid.

In April 1995, SuperAmerica offered a co-branded Visa credit card via National City Corp. that gave a 3% rebate for purchases made at SuperAmerica locations.

In 1997, Marathon and Ashland Petroleum merged, forming Marathon Ashland Petroleum LLC (MAP), a joint venture combining the companies' refining, marketing and transportation businesses, with Marathon owning 62% of the operations while Ashland owned 38%. In the process, Ashland's SuperAmerica and Marathon's Emro Marketing Company were merged to form Speedway SuperAmerica LLC, a wholly owned subsidiary of MAP. SuperAmerica stores outside the Upper Midwest were rebranded as Speedway, including briefly in Western Pennsylvania until Marathon decided to withdraw the Speedway brand in this area and sold off the stores in Greater Pittsburgh to independent owners and in at least one case to locally-based GetGo.

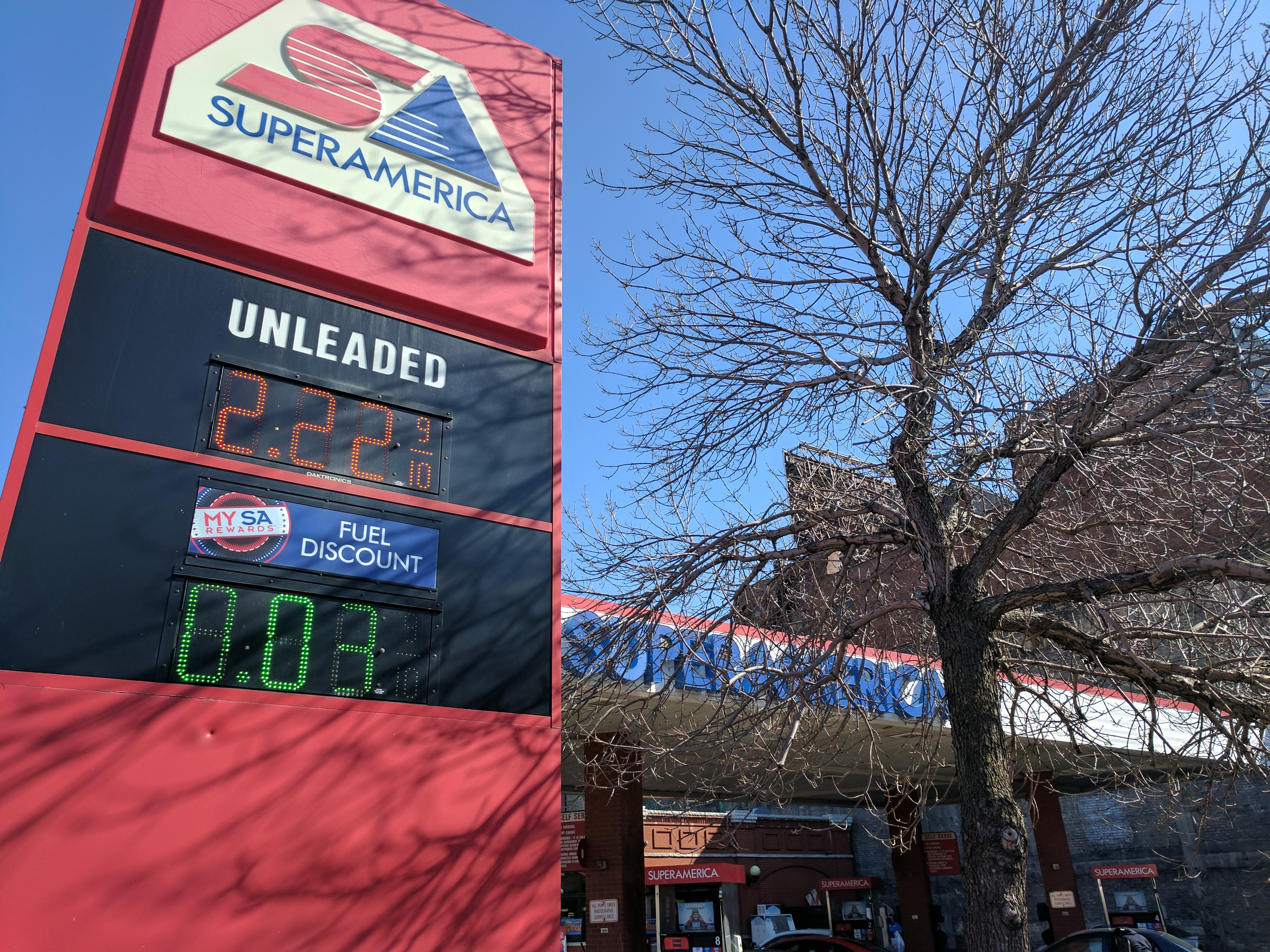
A SuperAmerica gas station in Saint Paul, Minnesota (2017)

In 2004 Marathon bought out Ashland's share. In February 2011, Marathon sold its SuperAmerica stores along with the Marathon refinery in St. Paul Park, Minnesota to Northern Tier Energy, a newly formed company backed by the private equity firms ACON Investments and TPG Capital. Northern Tier Energy went public in 2012. In 2013, Western Refining, a Marathon subsidiary, bought a controlling stake in Northern Tier Energy.

In May 2013, Holiday Stationstores acquired SuperAmerica's stores in Rochester, Minnesota.

In 2015, employees protested at the corporate headquarters in Woodbury, Minnesota, to lobby against low hourly wages and erratic employee scheduling.

During the early 2010s, following the chain's purchase by Northern Tier Energy, the chain began to fall behind competitors. Shoppers reported rusting canopies, water damaged ceilings, broken tile floors, and malfunctioning soda machines. As SuperAmerica's primary competitor Holiday Stationstores continually invested in locations (especially after that chain's acquisition by Circle K parent Alimentation Couche-Tard), SA stagnated. Upon Kwik Trip and Casey's entrance to the local market SA fell further behind. Holiday was generating twice as much revenue per store as SA. Furthermore, SA failed to further develop its food service offerings like their competitors did in the 2010s.

In 2018, SuperAmerica was rebranded as Speedway, after Marathon's acquisition of SuperAmerica in May 2018. Marathon ultimately sold Speedway to 7-Eleven in 2021. As some former SuperAmerica locations were originally 7-Eleven locations, those locations came full circle.

One store remains with SuperAmerica branding in Lexington, Kentucky. It is thought that the SuperAmerica name is used on this location to avoid trademark abandonment (similar to Chevron Corporation using the Standard Oil name on a small number of stations), as the name only appears on the price sign, canopy, and building; the location (including the pumps) is otherwise a Speedway.

== Rewards programs ==
SuperAmerica maintained a rewards program for customers called "My SA Rewards". Points in the program were redeemable for discounts in gasoline purchase or on other purchases in stores. The rewards program offered 3 cents off per gallon of gasoline. From 2011 to 2016, the company accepted the coupons of competitors gas coupons. The company also offered its own credit card to reduce cost of gasoline by 5 cents per gallon. The credit card was offered to customers in partnership with the bank First Bankcard.
