= List of mayors of San Angelo, Texas =

The following is a list of mayors of the city of San Angelo, Texas, United States.

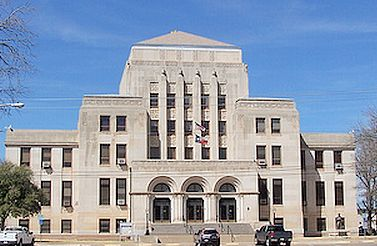
City hall building in San Angelo, Texas (photo 2006)

- J. G. Preusser, 1888-1891
- Charles T. Paul, 1909
- George J. Bird, 1915-1917
- R. H. Henderson, 1918
- W. D. Holcombе, 1928
- A. A. Glover, 1929-1930
- Brown F. Lee, 1931
- J. L. Tweedy, 1934-1935
- Dorsey Hardeman, 1936-1937
- B. A. Carter, 1938-1939
- W. A. Halamicek, 1940
- Harvey H. Allen, 1945
- Will R. Ede, 1946
- E. A. Vautrain, 1948
- A. D. Rust, 1950-1951, 1953
- Allie T. Hughes, 1952, 1962
- M. D. Bryant, 1954
- H. E. McCulloch, 1956
- R. E. Windham, 1958
- Paul Hudman, 1960
- Leon Abbott, 1964
- Ray Dorrance, 1966-1969
- Wylie O. Webb, 1970
- C. S. Conrad, 1972-1973
- Robert L. McClellan, 1975
- Bob McClellan, 1976
- Tom R. Parrett, 1977-1984
- Burt Terrill, 1985-1986
- Dick Funk, 1987-1989, 1993-1997
- Tim Edwards, 1989-1991
- Don Butts, 1991-1993
- Johnny Fender, 1997-2001
- Rudy Izzard, 2001-2003
- J. W. Lown, 2003-2009
- Alvin New, 2009-2013
- Dwain Morrison, 2013-2017
- Brenda Gunter, 2017-2025
- Tom Thompson, 2025-present

== See also ==
- San Angelo history
