= Western Refining =

American crude oil refining company

Western Refining, Inc.
- Company type: Subsidiary
- Industry: Oil
- Founded: 1997
- Headquarters: El Paso, Texas, USA
- Number of locations: 3 oil refineries, 543 retail locations
- Area served: United States; Mexico
- Key people: Jeff A. Stevens (Chief Executive Officer); Paul L. Foster (Chairman of the Board)
- Products: Refined products
- Production output: Crude oil
- Services: Convenience stores Service stations
- Revenue: ▲$ 15.2 billion (2014).
- Operating income: ▲$ 1.1 billion (2014).
- Net income: ▲$ 710.1 million (2014).
- Total assets: ▲$ 5.67 billion (2014).
- Total equity: ▲$ 2.79 billion (2014).
- Number of employees: 5,700
- Parent: Marathon Petroleum
- Subsidiaries: Western Refining Logistics
- Website: marathonpetroleum.com

Western Refining, Inc., is a Texas-based Fortune 200 and Global 2000 crude oil refiner and marketer operating primarily in the Southwestern, North-Central and Mid-Atlantic regions of the United States. Western Refining (WNR) has been publicly traded on the New York Stock Exchange since January 2006 and is the fourth largest publicly traded independent refiner and marketer in the nation.

The company is headquartered in El Paso, Texas; its refineries are located in El Paso, Gallup, New Mexico, and St. Paul Park, Minnesota. These refineries have a combined crude oil processing capacity of approximately 242,500 barrels per day (38,550 m^{3}/d). A majority of products produced at these refineries are light products, consisting of gasoline, diesel fuel, and jet fuel. All three refineries have truck loading terminals. The El Paso refinery delivers to a number of other markets via pipeline.

Western Refining owns and operates a wholesale division that works in conjunction with the refining operations. Through the refineries and these affiliated companies, Western Refining serves a broad customer base in Arizona, California, Colorado, Minnesota, Nevada, New Mexico, western Texas, Utah, Wisconsin, northern Chihuahua, Mexico, and the central East Coast region.

In late 2016, it was announced that the San Antonio, Texas based refining and logistics company Tesoro, renamed to Andeavor, would purchase Western Refining for an estimated enterprise value of $6.4 Billion. Stockholders from both companies approved the proposed deal on March 24, 2017, pending approval from the Federal Trade Commission.

In 2017, Western Refining was acquired by Tesoro (another independent petroleum Refining and marketing corporation) and the combined company changed its name to Andeavor.

Western is currently a subsidiary of Marathon Petroleum, after Marathon's acquisition of Andeavor in 2018.

== History ==
The El Paso refinery was originally two refineries across from each other on Trowbridge Avenue, one operated by Texaco, the other, larger, by Chevron Oil. In 1997 the company Refinery Holding was formed to manage the refineries; it purchased them outright in 2000. Western Refining purchased a pipeline system from Chevron capable of delivering 115,000 barrels of crude oil per day. In 2006 it became a publicly traded company on the New York Stock Exchange.

On August 28, 2006, Western Refining bought Giant Industries (GI) for $1.23 billion in cash, creating the fourth-largest publicly traded independent oil refiner in the USA. The combined company created the capacity to handle about 216,000 barrels a day from four refineries, about 84% more than Western's current capacity at the time.

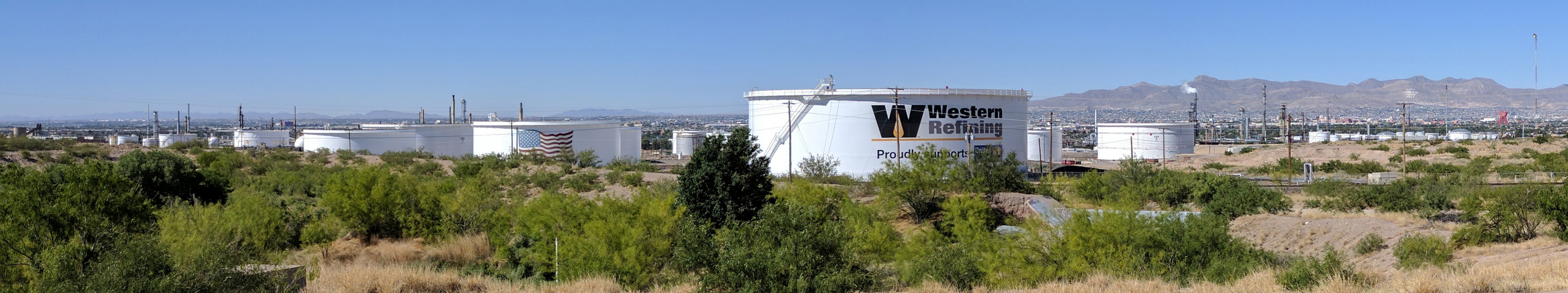
Western Refining's El Paso site

On November 12, 2013, Western acquired ACON Investments and TPG's ownership interests in Northern Tier Energy LP(NTI) for $775 million. This acquisition included the St. Paul Park Refinery which increased Western's refining barrel capacity by 89,500 barrels per day. It also acquired pipeline access to Bakken and Canadian crude oil plus product terminals, storage tanks, rail facilities and Mississippi river dockage. The company also gained ownership of retail assets that included SuperAmerica retail channel of 163 company operated and 74 franchised convenience stores.

In addition to its refineries, Giant Industries, based in Scottsdale, Arizona, owned a crude-oil-gathering pipeline system based in Farmington, New Mexico, a fleet of crude-oil and finished-product truck transports and a chain of retail service stations and convenience stores in New Mexico, Colorado, and Arizona.

== Current capacity ==
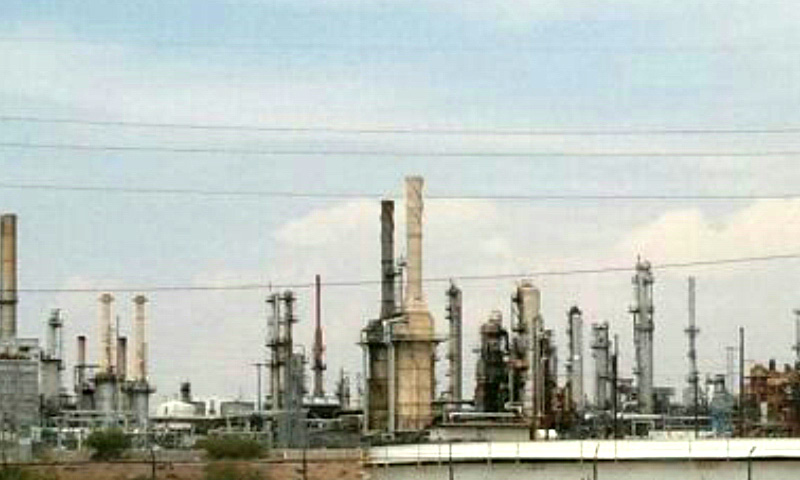
Main refinery in El Paso

The current capacity of the El Paso refinery is 128,000 barrels per day. An expansion is in the planning stages for 2013/2014 to increase capacity to 150,000 barrel per day. The refinery near Gallup, New Mexico, has a capacity of 26,000 barrels per day after an expansion during 2012. Western Refining also owns a refinery in Bloomfield, New Mexico, but it's currently closed.

Western Refining sold the Yorktown terminal and refinery as well as a segment of an oil pipeline in New Mexico to subsidiaries of Plains All American Pipeline Co for approximately $220 million. The company retained its East Coast wholesale business and continued to market petroleum products in the Mid-Atlantic region, but focused its refining and most of its wholesale, retail, and marketing operations in the US Southwest. With the purchase of the St. Paul Park refinery, Western's total capacity is of approximately 242,500 barrels per day (38,550 m^{3}/d).

== Terminals and other locations ==
Western Refining has refined products terminals in Albuquerque and Bloomfield, New Mexico, and Yorktown, Virginia, asphalt terminals in Phoenix and Tucson, Arizona, Albuquerque, and El Paso. It also has a fleet of crude oil and finished product truck transports, and wholesale petroleum products operations in Arizona, California, Colorado, Nevada, New Mexico, Texas, Utah, Virginia and Maryland.

== Retail ==
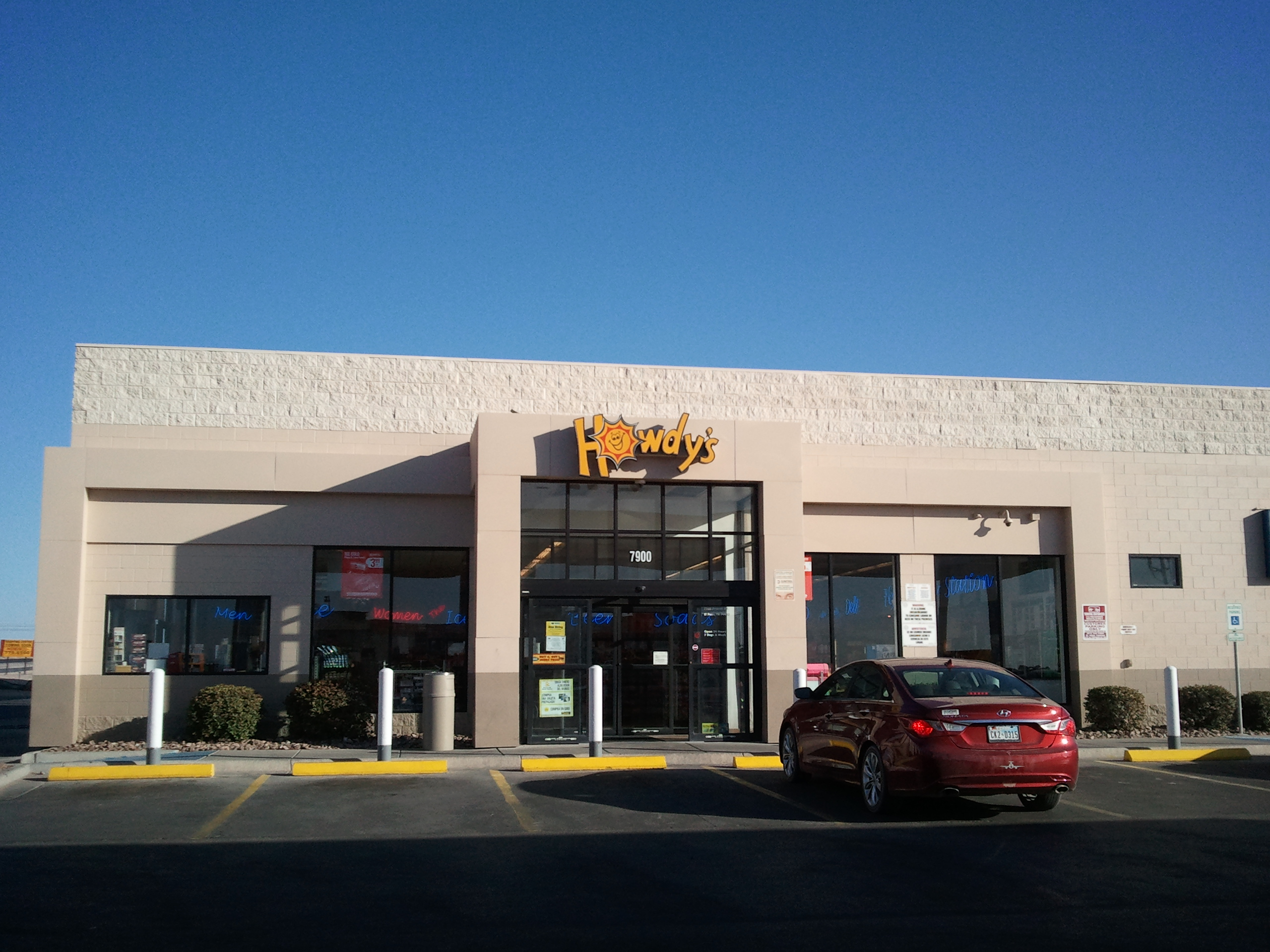
Howdy's convenience store, part of Western Refining's retail services

Western owns and operates more than 260 convenience stores and gas stations located in Arizona, Colorado, New Mexico, and Texas. The company markets under its own brands of Giant, Mustang, Sundial, and (through Northern Tier Energy in the Minnesota, Wisconsin and South Dakota) SuperAmerica, plus a number of locations feature the brands of other oil companies. They also license Western branded fuel to other retail stores. Western both purchases oil from the Mexican parastatal Pemex and sells refined oil products back to buyers in Mexico.

== Western Refining Logistics ==
In July 2013 Western Refining hoped to raise $287.5 million in a public stock offering for its recently formed pipeline and storage subsidiary, Western Refining Logistics (WNRL). The subsidiary, formed as a limited partnership, will operate, develop, and acquire terminals, storage tanks, pipelines and other logistic assets, the company reported in a filing with the U.S. Securities and Exchange Commission. It now has 300 miles of crude oil pipelines and gathering systems, and storage and terminal facilities for crude oil and fuel in West Texas and New Mexico.

The bulk of the money raised from the stock offering would go to the parent Western Refining to reimburse the company for the assets used to form the logistics company, Western reported in its filing. It would use $50 million of the money raised for general partnership purposes, it reported.

The logistics company will initially get all revenue through a 10-year, fee-based agreement with the parent Western Refining for pipeline, terminal and storage services it reported. The fees are expected to total almost $120 million next year, or 92 percent of its forecasted annual revenues of almost $131 million.
