= Speedway (store) =

American convenience store and fuel station chain

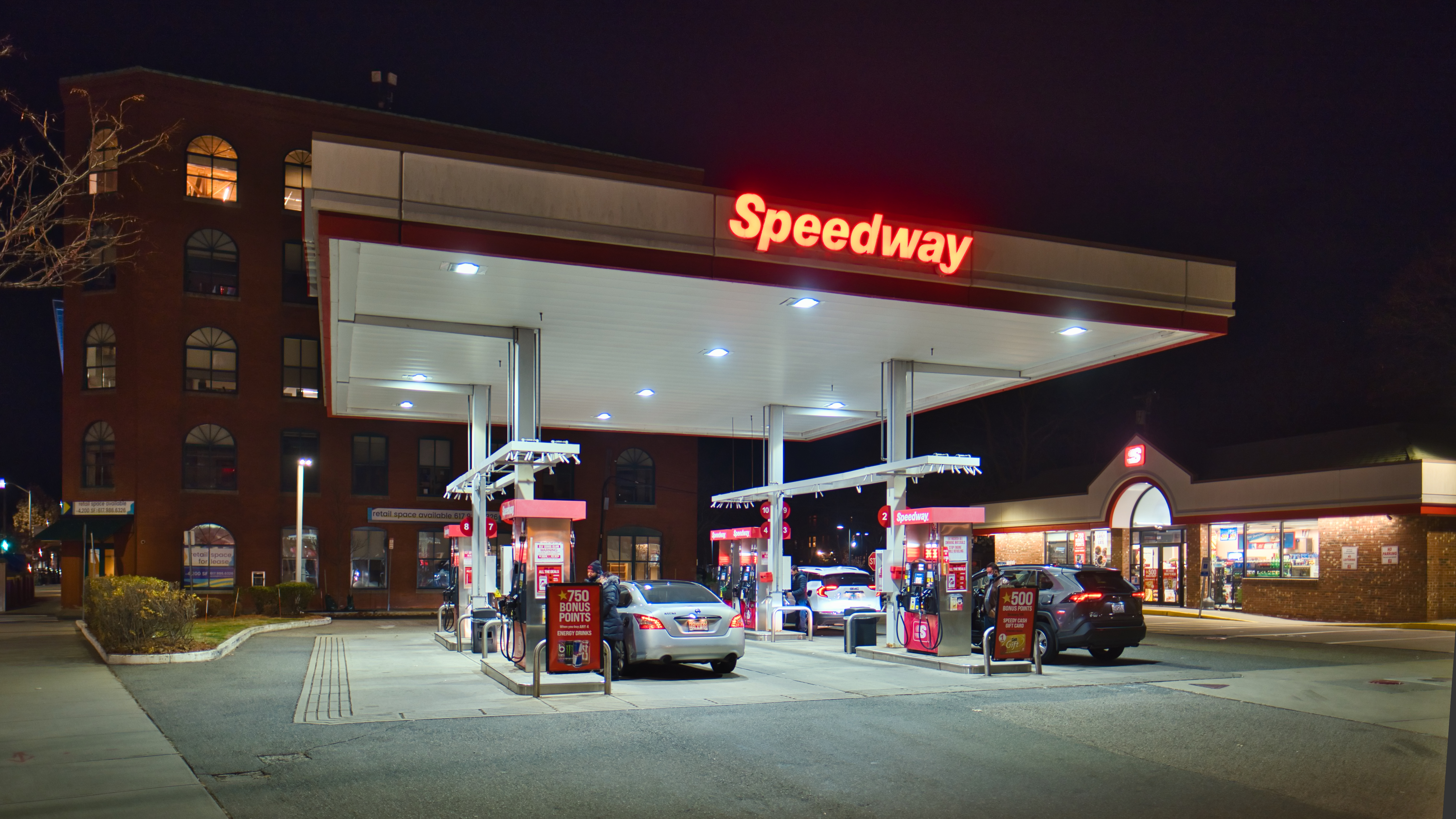
- Speedway fuel station and store (formerly a Hess) in Cambridge, Massachusetts
- Type: Subsidiary
- Industry: Retail (convenience store)
- Founded: 1952 (1st incarnation); 1975 (2nd incarnation as brand); July 18, 1997; 29 years ago (as subsidiary of Marathon Ashland Petroleum LLC)
- Defunct: 1962 (1st incarnation); May 14, 2021; 5 years ago (as standalone company; Speedway LLC still exists as in-name subsidiary of 7-Eleven, Inc.)
- Fate: Acquired by 7-Eleven; brand name continues to be used.
- Headquarters: 3200 Hackberry Road, Irving, Texas, US
- Number of locations: 3,923 (December 31st, 2018)
- Revenue: $23.55 billion (2018)
- Net income: $1,028 million (2018)
- Owner: Seven & I Holdings
- Number of employees: 40,230 (2018)
- Parent: Marathon Oil (1959–2011); Marathon Petroleum (2011–2021); 7-Eleven (2021–present)
- Website: www.speedway.com

A Speedway fountain drink machine in Neville Township, Pennsylvania, after 7-Eleven's purchase of Speedway featuring Big Gulp branded soft drinks

Speedway is an American convenience store and filling station chain headquartered in Irving, Texas, with locations primarily in the Midwest, East Coast, and Southwestern regions of the United States . Speedway stations are located in 36 states, up significantly from its core seven-state region in the Midwest in 2012. It is the largest convenience store chain in central Ohio.

Form 1959 to 2021, Speedway LLC was a wholly owned subsidiary of the Marathon Petroleum Corporation and headquartered in Enon, Ohio. On August 2, 2020, Marathon announced that 7-Eleven would be acquiring Speedway for $21 billion. The deal closed on May 14, 2021.

== History ==
Speedway started in 1952 as Speedway 79, the name of a fuel chain based in Michigan. Unlike other fuel station chains at the time, Speedway 79 did not have a service station to perform vehicle maintenance, but rather vending machines that focused on cigarette and soft drink sales, giving their locations the nickname "Smokes and Cokes". The "79" denoted the octane rating of Speedway's gasoline. In 1959, Marathon Oil, then known as the Ohio Oil Company, purchased the chain and in 1962 converted its outlets to the Marathon brand.

As self-service fuel became legalized in many states, in May 1975 Marathon decided to use "Speedway" (without the "79", as 87 octane had become the standard at this point) at higher-volume self-service stations with convenience stores. Some of the first were converted from Oshkosh, Wisconsin–based Consolidated Stores, which at the time had locations in Wisconsin and Michigan. These stores were converted to the Speedway name throughout the 1970s and 1980s after Marathon acquired Consolidated. The concept turned out to be one of the few bright spots for Marathon during this time due to the 1970s energy crisis, and the company quickly expanded this concept across Marathon's main territories across the Midwest and Southeastern United States. Part of this expansion was through the acquisition of various other smaller regional fuel station chains, including GasAmerica, Starvin' Marvin, Gastown, Wake Up, Bonded, United, Cheker, Port, Ecol, and Value. These stations were converted to the Speedway branding. Stations acquired in the Cheker deal included former Enco stations that Cheker acquired after they were sold off by Exxon in 1977. Legally, Marathon's convenience store business was known as Emro Marketing Company during this period, getting its name from placing an "E" in front of Marathon Oil's ticker symbol, MRO. Speedway adopted its current logo, known as the "Moving S", in 1982.

In 1997, Marathon and Ashland Petroleum formed Marathon Ashland Petroleum LLC (MAP), a joint venture which combined the companies' refining, marketing, and transportation businesses, with Marathon owning 62% of the operations while Ashland owned 38%. In the process, Ashland's SuperAmerica and Marathon's Speedway convenience store chains were merged to form Speedway SuperAmerica LLC, a wholly owned subsidiary of MAP. At this time, Marathon acquired the rights to the Solo, Save Mart, Save More, and Rich brands from Ashland, along with others. Many of these brands would be converted to the Speedway brand over time. When the merger was completed in 1998, the Speedway and SuperAmerica brands began to market together. Marathon Ashland also purchased Total Petroleum of Alma, Michigan, in 1999. The stations, which had been previously owned by Diamond Shamrock, were mostly in the state of Michigan. Most former Total locations were then rebranded to Marathon, Speedway, or Rich. Speedway acquired the 50-unit Welsh Mart chain of Michigan and Indiana in 2001. This was followed in 2002 by the acquisition of 30 stores from Grand Rapids, Michigan–based Crystal Flash.

In 2003, Marathon sold off Speedway's Southeastern stores to Sunoco, who promptly converted them to the A-Plus brand while selling Sunoco fuel, while Speedway's stores in Western Pennsylvania were sold off to independent owners and converted to standard Marathon stations, withdrawing the Speedway brand from Pennsylvania and south of West Virginia and Kentucky for a decade.

Speedway became one of the first convenience store chains in the industry to launch a loyalty program when it launched Speedy Rewards in 2004. The program was launched almost by accident: Marathon had launched a similar program for its traditional Marathon-branded fuel stations but found inconsistent use among its franchise owners and felt that the program might work better with Speedway, since all of its locations were owned and operated directly by Marathon. The program has since been ranked by multiple independent publications as being the best loyalty program on the market.

In 2005, Marathon purchased Ashland's share of Marathon Ashland Petroleum, which became Marathon Petroleum Company LLC, retaining the SuperAmerica and Rich brands that were originally owned by Ashland. At this time the locations outside the Upper Midwest were converted to Speedway and the SuperAmerica brand was restricted to the Upper Midwest market. Marathon sold SuperAmerica to Northern Tier Energy, a newly formed company backed by the private equity firms ACON Investments and TPG Capital, in February 2011. It is based in Woodbury, Minnesota. Speedway and SuperAmerica became unrelated chains until seven years later, when Marathon bought Andeavor, who owns SuperAmerica's parent company Western Refining. Following the separation of Marathon's upstream and downstream operations in 2011, Speedway remained a part of Marathon's downstream operations.

In 2001, Speedway's truck stop chain was merged into the Pilot Travel Centers brand after Marathon and Pilot Corporation entered into a partnership to form Pilot Travel Centers. Pilot has since bought out Marathon's interest in Pilot Travel Centers, now Pilot Flying J. Following its merger with Hess Corporation's retail chain in 2014, six WilcoHess locations in Virginia were rebranded as Pilot locations and jointly operated between Pilot Flying J and Speedway. On June 23, 2016, Pilot Flying J and Speedway announced a new joint venture between the two companies that will see 41 Speedway locations (all former Wilco Hess locations) and 79 Pilot Flying J locations primarily in the Southeastern United States form PFJ Southeast LLC. The locations will be operated by Pilot Flying J and the Speedway locations will be rebranded as either Pilot or Flying J.

As of December 9, 2014, 12% of Speedway stores carry E85 ethanol. Speedway currently has 326 stores with E85 available, and one store which carries CNG. Almost all of its stores in Greater Pittsburgh as well as its stores in the state of Tennessee offer E85, greatly expanding the availability of the fuel in these respective markets.

=== Expansion since 2012 ===
Map of states containing at least one Speedway fuel station as of December 2019; red indicates Speedway's core Midwestern states prior to its 2012 expansion, green indicates former Hess stations, orange indicates both former Hess stations and states where Speedway was already expanding into organically prior to the Hess purchase, and blue from the former Andeavor properties, including the SuperAmerica chain that Speedway owned and operated from 1997 to 2011.

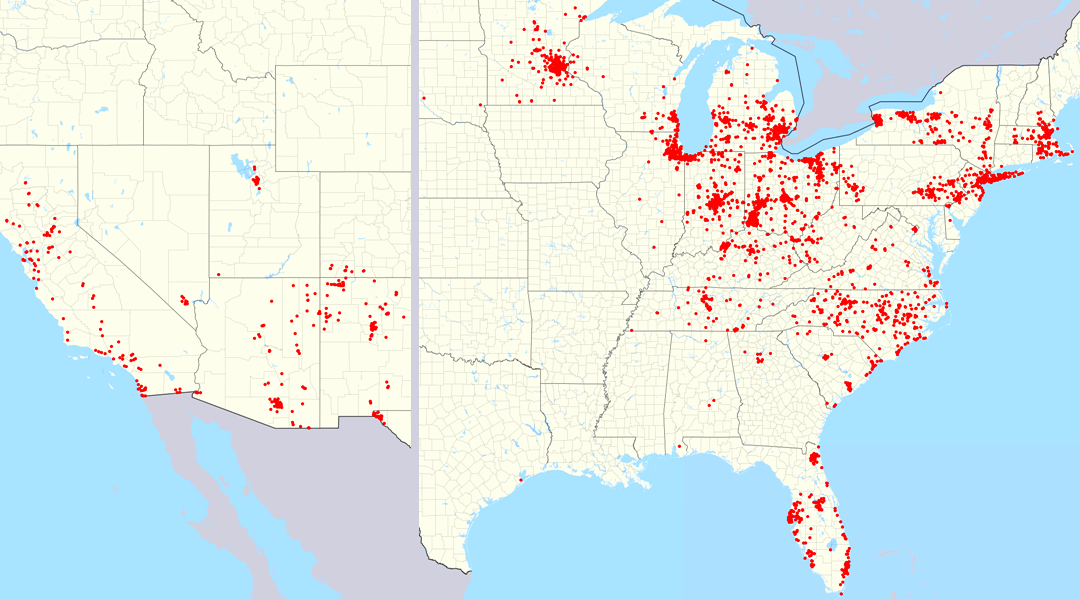
Map of Speedway locations as of August 2020 (the date of the announced purchase by 7-Eleven)

==== 2012–14 expansion ====
On February 13, 2012, it was announced that a deal had been reached with Indiana and Ohio convenience store chain GasAmerica to acquire all 88 of its locations. Speedway also acquired all trademarks, trade dress and intellectual property from GasAmerica and included several parcels of undeveloped real estate for future development. The transaction was finalized on May 29, 2012, for an unspecified price.

On June 5, 2012, it was reported that Speedway LLC signed a deal with the convenience store chain Road Ranger. The deal gave Speedway nine Road Ranger stores in Kentucky, and one in Ohio, in exchange for cash and a truck stop in the Chicago metropolitan area. Rockford, Illinois–based Road Ranger operates approximately 80 truck stop and fuel convenience store locations in seven Midwestern states. Like Speedway before it, Road Ranger has a partnership with Pilot Flying J.

In May 2014, Speedway announced they would purchase Hess Corporation's retail business for $2.6 billion. Hess has 1,342 locations along the Eastern United States. Some Hess stations in the Northeastern United States originated as Merit Oil stations until Hess bought the company in 2000. The acquisition was completed on October 1, 2014.

==== Post-Hess expansion ====
On April 30, 2018, Marathon agreed to buy Andeavor, an independent refinery and oil company based in the Western United States, for $23 billion. On October 1, 2018, the merger was completed. The merger brought all SuperAmerica locations once again under the ownership of Speedway, but instead of retaining the SuperAmerica brand, it was phased out in favor of the Speedway moniker. The merger also brought the Speedway brand to California, Utah and the American Southwest for the first time, becoming a coast-to-coast chain.

On April 16, 2018, it was announced that all 78 Express Mart locations were being re-branded as Speedway locations, which follows Marathon's acquisition of Express Mart, a chain based in Syracuse, New York, that co-branded with competitors such as Sunoco and Mobil. Speedway and MPC closed on the acquisition of Express Mart in November 2018, after being required by the FTC to divest of five stores. In 2019, they purchased 33 NOCO Express locations in Western New York. On October 31, Marathon Petroleum has announced the plans of spinning off Speedway into an independent company.

In May 2020, as many as 30 Speedway store locations were damaged by looting and rioting during the George Floyd protests in Minneapolis–Saint Paul, with nine locations suffering extensive arson damage.

On June 6, 2020, Dunkin' announced plans to close all Dunkin' Express locations at Speedway locations (which Speedway acquired as part of the acquisition of Hess retail business in 2014), by the end of the year.

In 2023, Speedway began gaining national attention when multiple locations that struggle with crime and loitering began playing loud opera music on a 24/7 loop to help deter loitering. The music has received mixed responses and in some cases negative responses from residents and other businesses in the area.

On July 19, 2024, Speedway locations that still used BlueCube and Radiant Site Manager dating from Marathon's ownership of Speedway were affected by the 2024 CrowdStrike-related IT outages, with some stores unable to accept credit or debit transactions while others were closed outright. Locations that had already switched to 7-Eleven's proprietary RIS system were not affected by the outage.

=== Other Brands ===
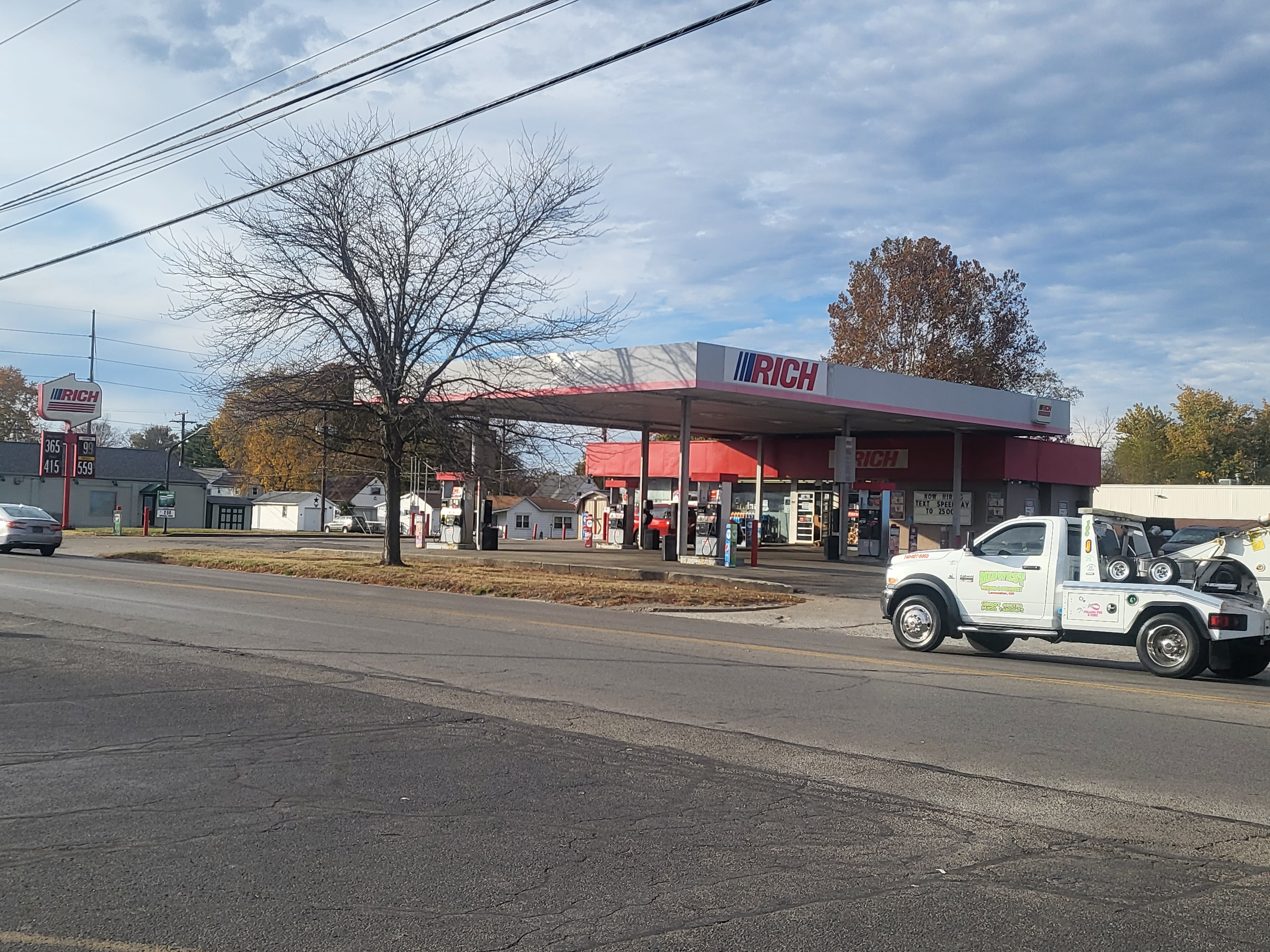
A Rich location on West Fair Avenue in Lancaster, Ohio, in 2022. This location closed on July 30, 2024.

By the late 1990s, Speedway had consolidated most of its legacy brands under the Speedway banner. However, following several major acquisitions, the company continued to operate a small number of alternative brands—aside from SuperAmerica—primarily at lower‑volume, corporate‑owned locations.

The most prominent of these was Rich, a discount fuel brand originally offered by Ashland. Rich was initially retained after Ashland’s acquisition of SuperAmerica to maintain the validity of the trademark. After the formation of Marathon Ashland Petroleum, the Rich brand was assigned to lower‑volume stores that resembled the earlier Speedway 79 concept. These locations typically offered limited in‑store merchandise such as tobacco, snacks, and beverages, and they did not participate in the Speedy Rewards loyalty program, although they did accept Speedway gift cards. As of 2024, 7‑Eleven has begun phasing out the remaining Rich‑branded locations.

Following Marathon Petroleum’s acquisition of Andeavor, many Andeavor‑supplied stations in California, Alaska, Oregon, and Washington that previously operated with Mobil, Shell, USA Gasoline, or ARCO–branded forecourts were rebranded as Speedway Express. These locations retained their independent convenience‑store operations, as the Speedway Express name was applied only to the fuel forecourt.

In contrast, company‑owned Andeavor stations were converted into full Speedway stores, reflecting Marathon’s standard branding strategy for corporate-operated sites.

Many Speedway Express locations in California and Alaska are operated by Rebel (Anabi Oil.) Speedway Express sites are dealer‑operated, they do not participate in the Speedy Rewards loyalty program, which is limited to corporate Speedway locations. Additionally, Speedway Express locations are not listed in the Speedway or 7-Eleven mobile apps.

== Separation from Marathon Petroleum and sale to Seven & i Holdings Co., Ltd. ==
A Speedway fuel pump with a 7-Eleven pump topper in Columbus, Ohio, in November 2021

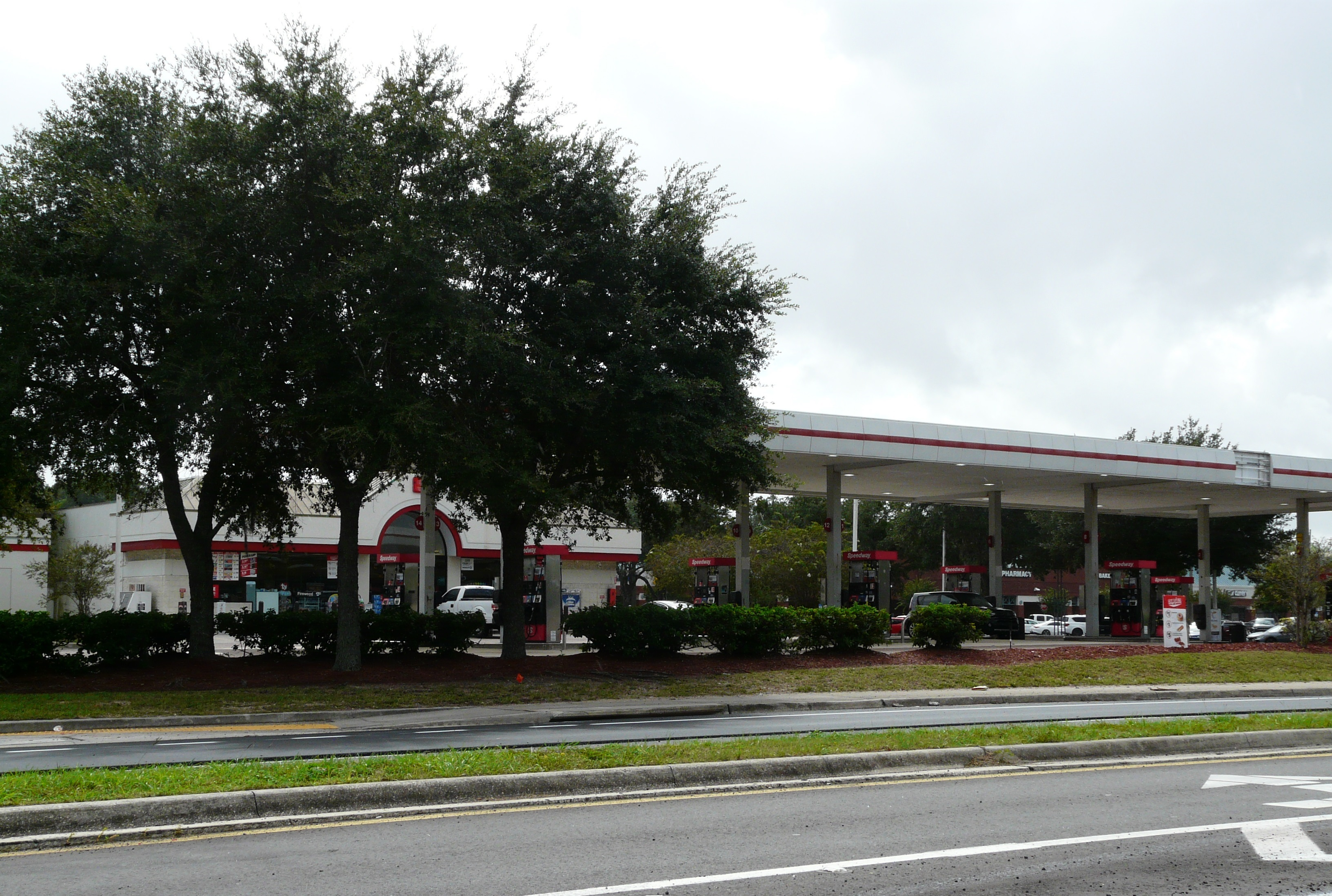
Speedway gas station in Jacksonville, Florida in 2025

In late 2018, Marathon announced their intentions to spin off Speedway into an independent company by the end of 2020.

In February 2020, it was reported that Seven & i Holdings Co., Ltd., the parent company of convenience store chain 7-Eleven, planned to buy Speedway for $22 billion. However, due to investor concerns that the offer was too high, as well as the potential impact the COVID-19 pandemic would have on the economy, the company abandoned the idea the following month.

Despite initially abandoning the acquisition, on August 2, 2020, Marathon announced that Seven & i Holdings Co., Ltd. would be acquiring Speedway for $21 billion. The deal closed on May 14, 2021, despite protests from the Federal Trade Commission.

On June 25, 2021, the Federal Trade Commission, Marathon, and 7-Eleven agreed on the divestitures of 291 Speedway and two 7-Eleven stores to three companies: Anabi Oil (doing business as Rebel Convenience Stores), CrossAmerica Partners, and Jacksons Food Stores. As part of the agreement, Marathon and 7-Eleven must seek FTC approval to reacquire the stores for five years after the sale. Most of the stores being sold off are in California, Florida, and New York. Following a round of layoffs that heavily impacted the former Speedway headquarters in Enon, Ohio in July 2022, Speedway's operations were largely integrated into 7-Eleven's headquarters in Irving, Texas, in the Dallas-Fort Worth Metroplex while the former Enon headquarters was officially rebranded as the Enon Store Support Center, functioning largely for IT-related issues for the company.

7-Eleven has not disclosed publicly the future of the Speedway chain, but it is expected that the two chains' respective loyalty programs (7 Rewards and Speedy Rewards) will be merged. 7-Eleven slowly started rebranding many Speedway products in November 2021, starting with Speedway's Club Chill & Speedy Freeze drinks being rebranded under the Big Gulp and Slurpee names respectively, while Speedway's store brand products such as Speedy Choice snacks and Enon Springs bottled water started being replaced by 7-Eleven's own 7 Select in December 2021. Many fans of Speedy Freeze complained on social media about the drink being replaced by Slurpee-branded products, though other frozen drink fans have said the two drinks are identical. 7-Eleven also removed Speedway from Pilot Flying J's One9 fueling network for truck drivers in favor of their own 7 Fleet fueling network.

In March 2022, Speedway began replacing its roller grill items such as Tornados and egg rolls with 7-Eleven's proprietary Big Bite products such as large hot dogs, cheeseburger links, and taquitos. Throughout 2022, Speedway locations that had Speedway's own Speedy Café quick service restaurant concept had their café's gradually replaced by 7-Eleven's own concepts, either Raise the Roost Chicken & Biscuits or Laredo Taco Company, the latter of which was acquired when 7-Eleven purchased Stripes Convenience Stores.

As part of the deal, Marathon agreed to supply the Speedway locations with fuel for 15 years. If 7-Eleven decides to convert the Speedway brand name over to 7-Eleven, it is not known if the locations would sell 7-Eleven branded fuel or sell Marathon or ARCO-branded fuel. Prior to the deal, Marathon had an existing partnership with 7-Eleven, mostly in Appalachia.

In a departure from its Marathon days, in March 2023 7-Eleven announced plans to install its 7 Charge electric vehicle charging stations across all of its banners including Speedway. The charging stations support CCS and CHAdeMO plugs, as well as Tesla vehicles with an adapter.

== Public relations ==
A corporate partner of Children's Miracle Network Hospitals since 1991, Speedway has raised more than $100 million over the past 26 years for the charity through a variety of fundraising activities. Speedway LLC raised $10.3 million for Children's Miracle Network Hospitals in 2017. The partnership between Speedway and Children's Miracle Network Hospitals was strong enough by the time of the 7-Eleven deal that 7-Eleven itself became a partner with Children's Miracle Network Hospitals in 2022.

Speedway was ranked the 4th worst company to work for in the United States in 2018, with work-life balance and senior management as major detractors to the work environment. These issues are highlighted in the memoir Corporate Lunacy; Behind the Scenes of America's Worst Gas Station (written by Rob Clooney).

Speedway LLC was the Official Fuel of the NTT IndyCar Series, and Indianapolis Motor Speedway from 2019 through 2022. Continuing from the 2012 formulation the fuel spec was E85 race fuel, and announced their endorsement of LPGA golfer Ally Ewing.

== See also ==
- List of automotive fuel brands
