= Town & Country Food Stores =

Chain of convenience stores based in San Angelo, Texas

Town & Country Food Stores (T&C) was an employee-owned chain of convenience stores based in San Angelo, Texas. It had over 168 locations spread throughout Texas and New Mexico and yearly revenue in 2006 of over $850 million (~$1.24 billion in 2023). It was purchased by Susser Holdings Corporation in 2007 when all stores underwent transition to Stripes Convenience Stores.

== History ==
T&C traces its history back to an earlier chain of the same name, founded in 1959 in Austin, Texas, by Paul Chintamani. However, during the early 1960s the predecessor chain found itself in financial trouble due to overexpansion.

In 1959, two company employees, H.A. "Harold" Gibbs (a San Angelo native) and F.L. "Steve" Stephens (district manager for the San Angelo area) purchased T&C's six San Angelo stores and one store located in Del Rio, Texas; as part of the purchase, the West Texas company also acquired the T&C name.

Paul Chintamani held a 51% stake in this company.

== Susser Holdings buyout ==
In September 2007, Susser Holdings of Corpus Christi, Texas, entered into an agreement to purchase Town & Country Food Stores for $361 million (~$511 million in 2023). The close of the transaction expected 90 days following federal approval. According to newspaper reports in the San Angelo Standard-Times, Town & Country stores were expected to be rebranded to Stripes convenience stores.
