= Holiday Stationstores =

American chain of gasoline and convenience stores

Holiday Stationstores LLC.

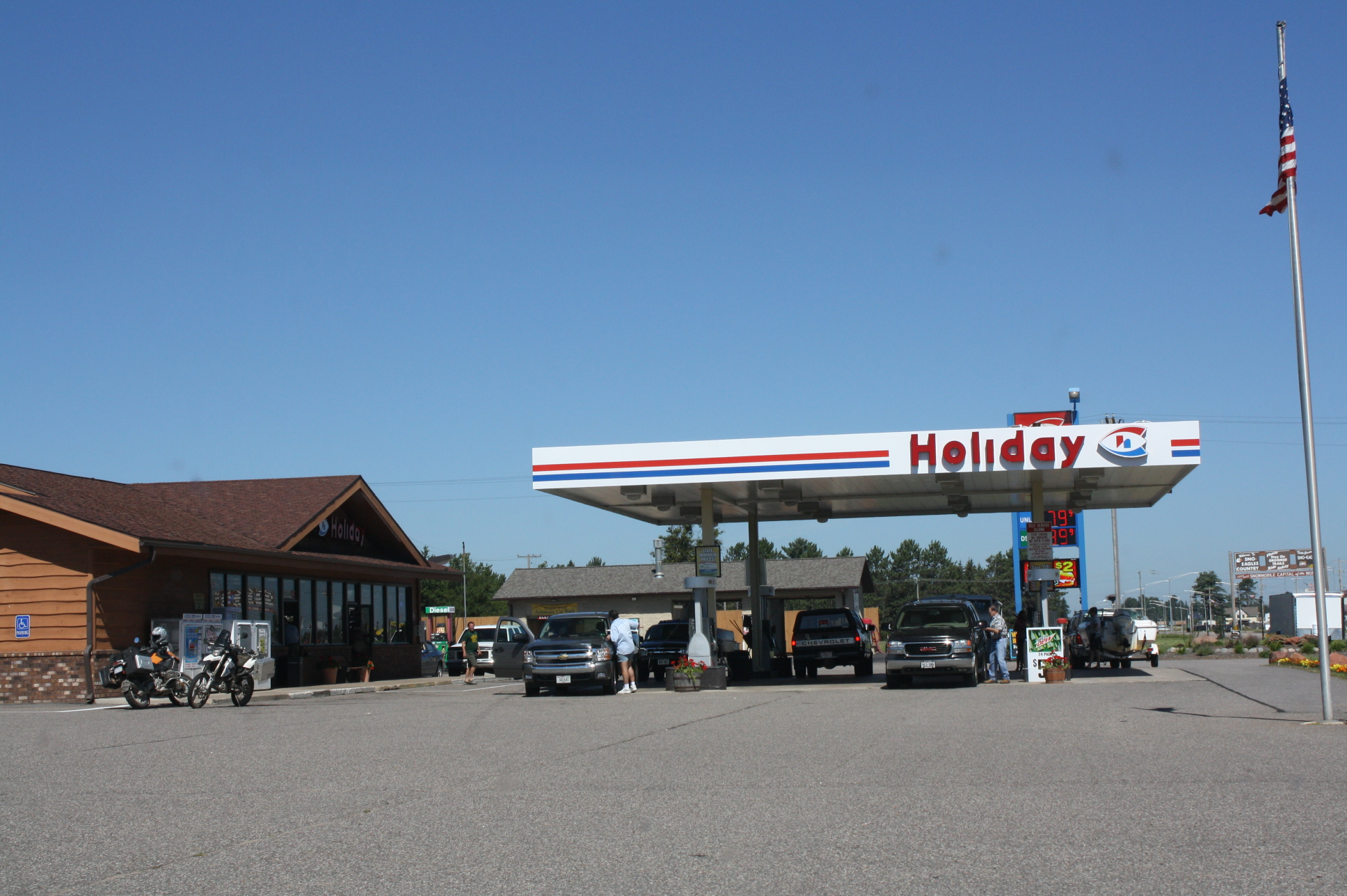
- Holiday in Eagle River, Wisconsin
- Company type: Subsidiary
- Industry: Retail
- Founded: 1928 (98 years ago) in Centuria, Wisconsin, U.S.
- Founders: Arthur and Alfred Erickson
- Headquarters: 6000 Clearwater Drive, Suite 300; Minnetonka, Minnesota, United States
- Number of locations: 505 (2017)
- Area served: Upper Midwest, West Coast, Alaska (Michigan, Wisconsin, Minnesota, North Dakota, South Dakota, Wyoming, Montana, Idaho, Washington, Alaska)
- Key people: Arthur Erickson, Alfred Erickson, Alain Bouchard, Brian Hannasch
- Products: Coffee; Hoagies; Prepared foods
- Services: Convenience store; Gas station; Fast foods
- Revenue: ▲US$1 billion (FY 2017)
- Number of employees: 6,000 (2020)
- Parent: Alimentation Couche-Tard
- Website: www.holidaystationstores.com

Holiday Stationstores is an American chain of gasoline and convenience stores based in Minnetonka, Minnesota. The chain operated roughly 500 locations in 10 states, mostly in its home state of Minnesota, as well as the Northern Tier (including Idaho, Michigan, Montana, North Dakota, South Dakota, Washington, Wisconsin and Wyoming) and Alaska.

In 2017, Holiday Stationstores was acquired by Quebecois convenience store operator Alimentation Couche-Tard for an undisclosed amount. In 2022, the company began to phase out Holiday in favor of its national Circle K brand. Holiday had ranked 133rd on Forbes' list of America's largest private companies before the acquisition.

== History ==
In 1928, Arthur and Alfred Erickson, using borrowed money, opened a small general store in Centuria, Wisconsin. Like most small business owners, they wanted to provide "the best goods and finest possible customer service". They were soon able to open additional locations throughout both Wisconsin and Minnesota. With the additional revenue, the brothers got into the petroleum business. In 1939, under the "Holiday" name, they added fueling stations to their general stores. The stores were labeled by their family "Erickson" name, while the fueling side of their business was labeled as "Holiday". Soon, the company began to expand its operations to other states and offering a wide-variety of products.

In May 2013, Holiday Stationstores acquired SuperAmerica's stores in Rochester, Minnesota.

=== Holiday Plus, Holiday Foods, and Holiday Express ===
In the 1960s, Holiday Companies expanded their business operations by constructing and operating full service discount stores and supermarkets. By the 1980s, with advanced competition from Walmart and Target, Holiday removed general merchandise from their stores and put in full sporting and outdoor goods departments (along with the supermarket). The name of these stores would be Holiday Plus. In the early 1990s, wanting to expand their grocery offerings, Holiday Companies separated their grocery and sporting good stores into two separate brands. The sporting good stores being branded as Holiday Sports, and the supermarkets as Holiday Foods. The Holiday Plus name went away. While Holiday Plus and Holiday Foods were in operation, Holiday's convenience stores were rebranded as Holiday Express. These express stores offered their petroleum and diesel products outside, and general merchandise along with basic groceries inside.

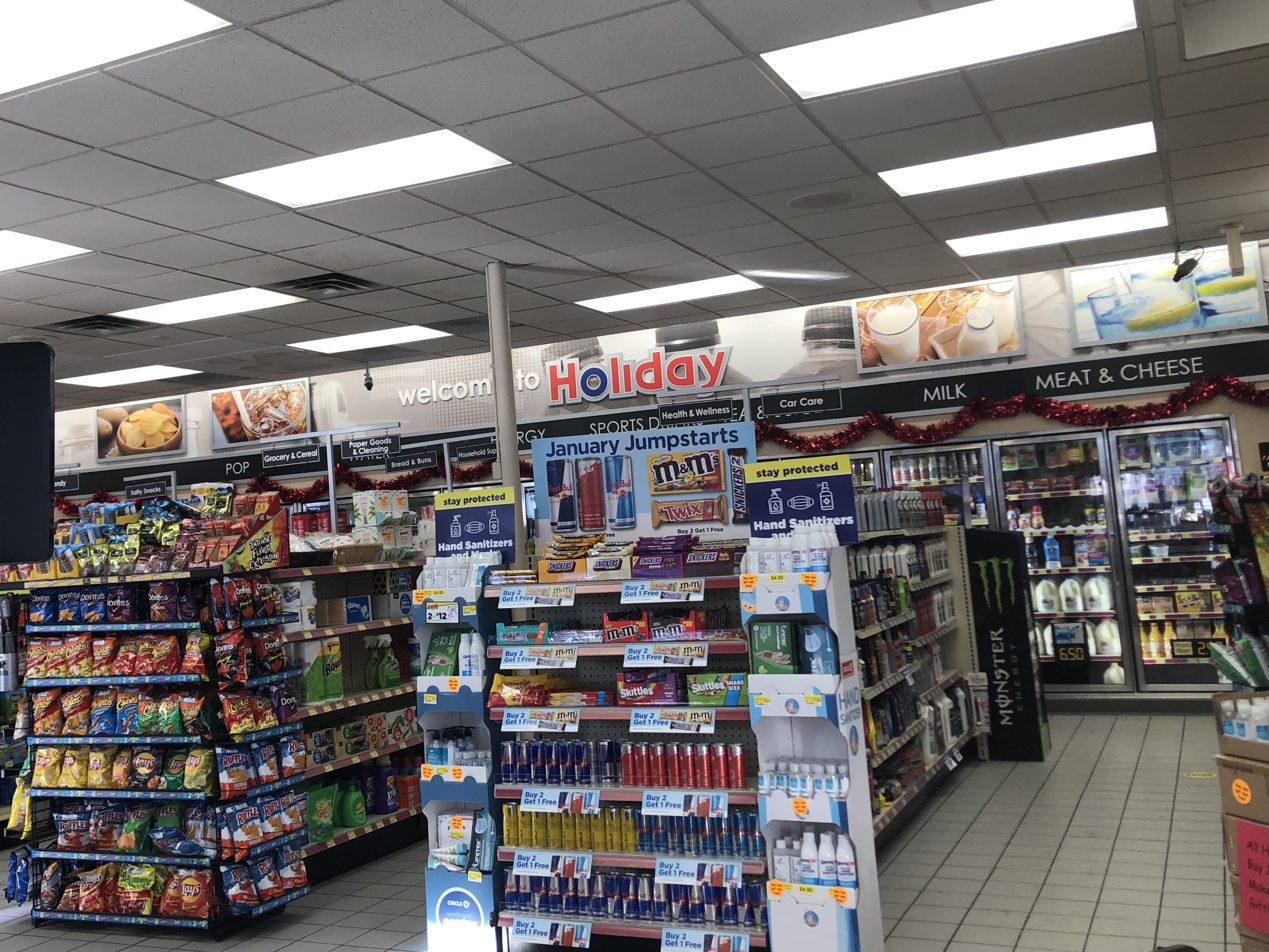
Interior of a Holiday gas station in Minneapolis, Minnesota

=== Gander Mountain ===
In 1996, after long bankruptcy negotiations with the Federal Bankruptcy Court, Gander Mountain, a large supplier of sporting and outdoor goods, filed a joint plan of reorganization under Chapter 11 Bankruptcy with Holiday Companies. Gander Mountain sold 12 of its 17 stores to Holiday and the existing Holiday Sports stores were rebranded to Gander Mountain. Soon after, Holiday Foods was sold off. After regaining financial and corporate stability, Gander Mountain went private with Holiday Companies being one of its two owners.

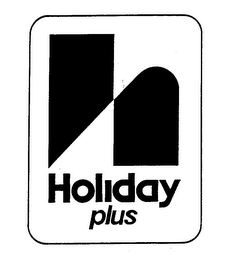
Holiday Plus logo

=== Acquisition by Couche-Tard, phase-out ===
In July 2017, Holiday and its roughly 507 stores were acquired by Quebec-based convenience store operator Alimentation Couche-Tard for an undisclosed amount. The acquisition would expand the company's holdings into six new states. After the acquisition, Couche-Tard would begin integrating some of Holiday's business practices and food service models into the national Circle K chain, including its "grab-and-go" meals, subscription programs for car washes, and some Circle K stores experimenting with adopting Holiday's store layout.

In 2022, Couche-Tard began to phase out the Holiday brand in favor of Circle K, with conversions beginning in Sioux Falls, South Dakota, and continuing on a market-by-market basis. Other locations had already begun to stock Couche-Tard private label products and use Circle K employee uniforms. Couche-Tard stated that the rebranded stores would maintain existing partnerships (such as its fuel rewards program with Cub) established under Holiday.
