= A-Plus (store) =

American convenience store chain

- Type: Private
- Industry: Retail (Convenience stores)
- Predecessor: ampm (East Coast only)
- Founded: 1985
- Founder: Atlantic Petroleum
- Products: Dairy, Snacks, Beverages. Coffee, Deli
- Owner: Sunoco LP (Energy Transfer Partners); Seven & I Holdings Co. (select locations)
- Website: https://www.myaplus.com/

APlus (or A-Plus) is an American convenience store chain owned and operated by Energy Transfer Partners, with some stores currently owned by Seven & I Holdings (7-Eleven). APlus is also the convenience store chain used by Sunoco.

== History ==
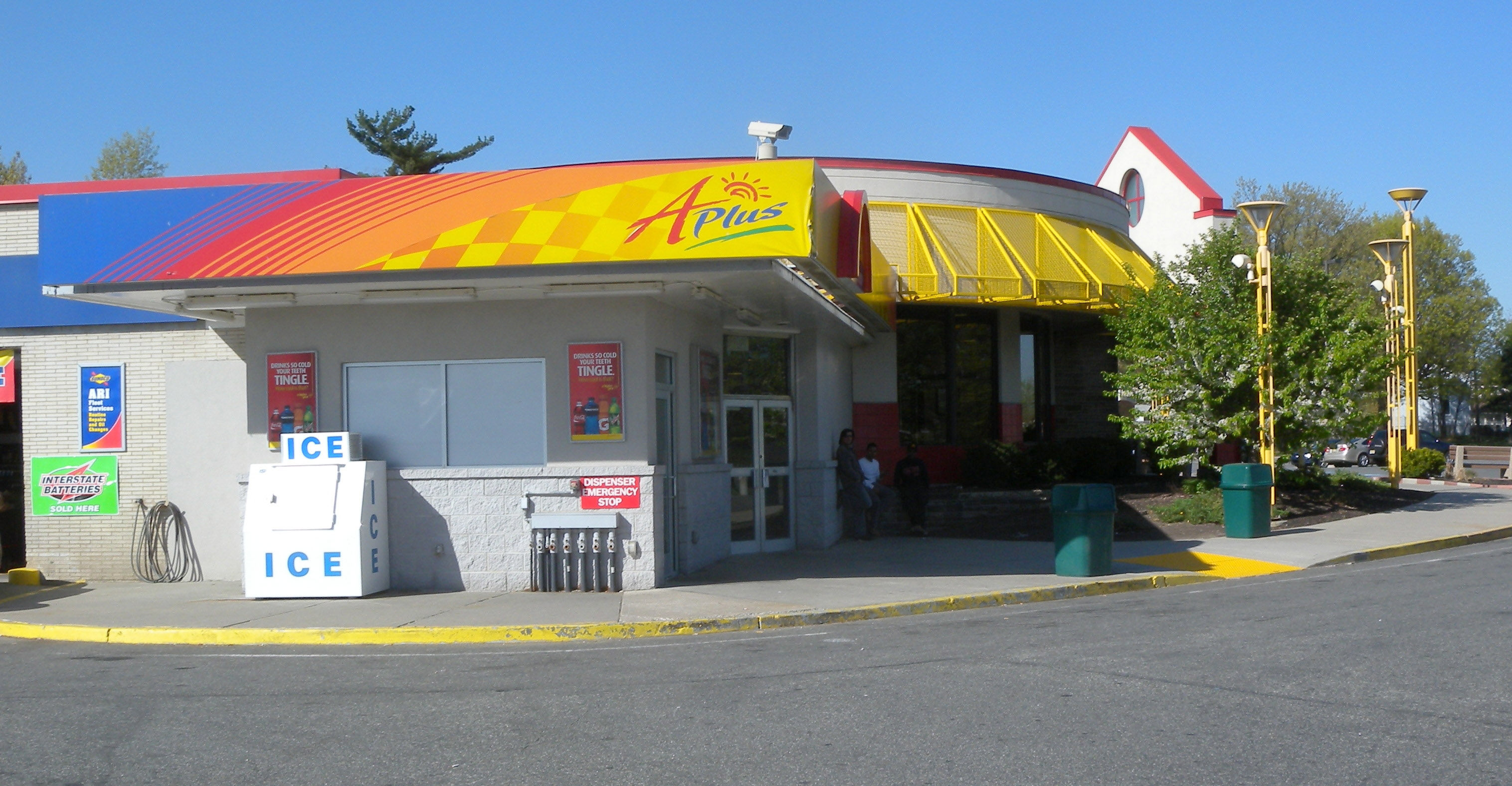
Secaucus, New Jersey

The chain began life as the convenience store chain for Atlantic Petroleum in 1985, which was spun off from ARCO, Inc. (ARCO itself was formed from the 1966 merger of Atlantic Refining and Richfield Oil.) The first Aplus stores were rebranded ampm locations.

In 1988, Sunoco bought Atlantic, and since Sunoco did not have its own convenience store chain, APlus became Sunoco's chain by default. While Atlantic stations were converted to Sunoco by the mid-1990s, APlus grew, with Sunoco rebranding many company-owned stations in the Northeastern United States with convenience stores into APlus. Sunoco has even converted some garages into convenience stores with the APlus brand.

Sunoco still used the APlus logo from the Atlantic days until 1999, when Sunoco updated its own logo and completely redesigning APlus's logo, giving it a more Sunoco look.

The split between company-owned and franchised locations is about 50/50.

Originally a U.S. Northeast brand, Sunoco has rapidly expanded the APlus moniker. In 2001, Sunoco expanded APlus into the Southeastern United States by purchasing 193 of Marathon Oil's Speedway SuperAmerica convenience stores—115 in Florida, 62 in South Carolina, 13 in North Carolina, and 3 in Georgia. Further expansion is being pushed as part of Sunoco's NASCAR sponsorship, where APlus is known as the "Official Pit Stop of NASCAR".

In October 2013, Sunoco purchased Mid-Atlantic Convenience Stores, a Richmond, Virginia based Circle K Franchisee, with over 300 stores in the mid-atlantic region. These locations continued to operate as Circle K until early 2016, when they were converted to the APlus brand. Though operated by Sunoco, the majority of the locations continue to sell Exxon fuels.

On January 23, 2018, Dallas, Texas-based 7-Eleven bought 1,030 APlus convenience stores located in 17 states; the deal also included sister chain Stripes Convenience Stores. The acquisition, which is the largest in the company's history (since surpassed by 7-Eleven's 2021 acquisition of Speedway from Marathon Petroleum), brings the total number of stores to approximately 9,700 in the U.S. and Canada. Many APlus stores are expected to be rebranded to 7-Eleven stores.

As of 2021, 7-Eleven is still in the process of rebranding the acquired locations. However, Sunoco still owns or franchises roughly 350 convenience store locations (many of which are branded as A-Plus).

== Products ==
The list of products offered at APlus locations:

- Gulliver's Coffee — APlus's gourmet coffee. Competes with Circle K's Millstone coffee and Sheetz's Sheetz Bros. Coffee.
- City Deli — APlus's hot foods area. Likely conceived to compete with Sheetz's MTO's, which overlap APlus in several areas in Pennsylvania, though it is more similar to Giant Eagle's GetGo Kitchen at their GetGo chain. Currently available only at newer, larger locations.
