= St. Paul Park, Minnesota =

City in Minnesota, United States

St. Paul Park
- City
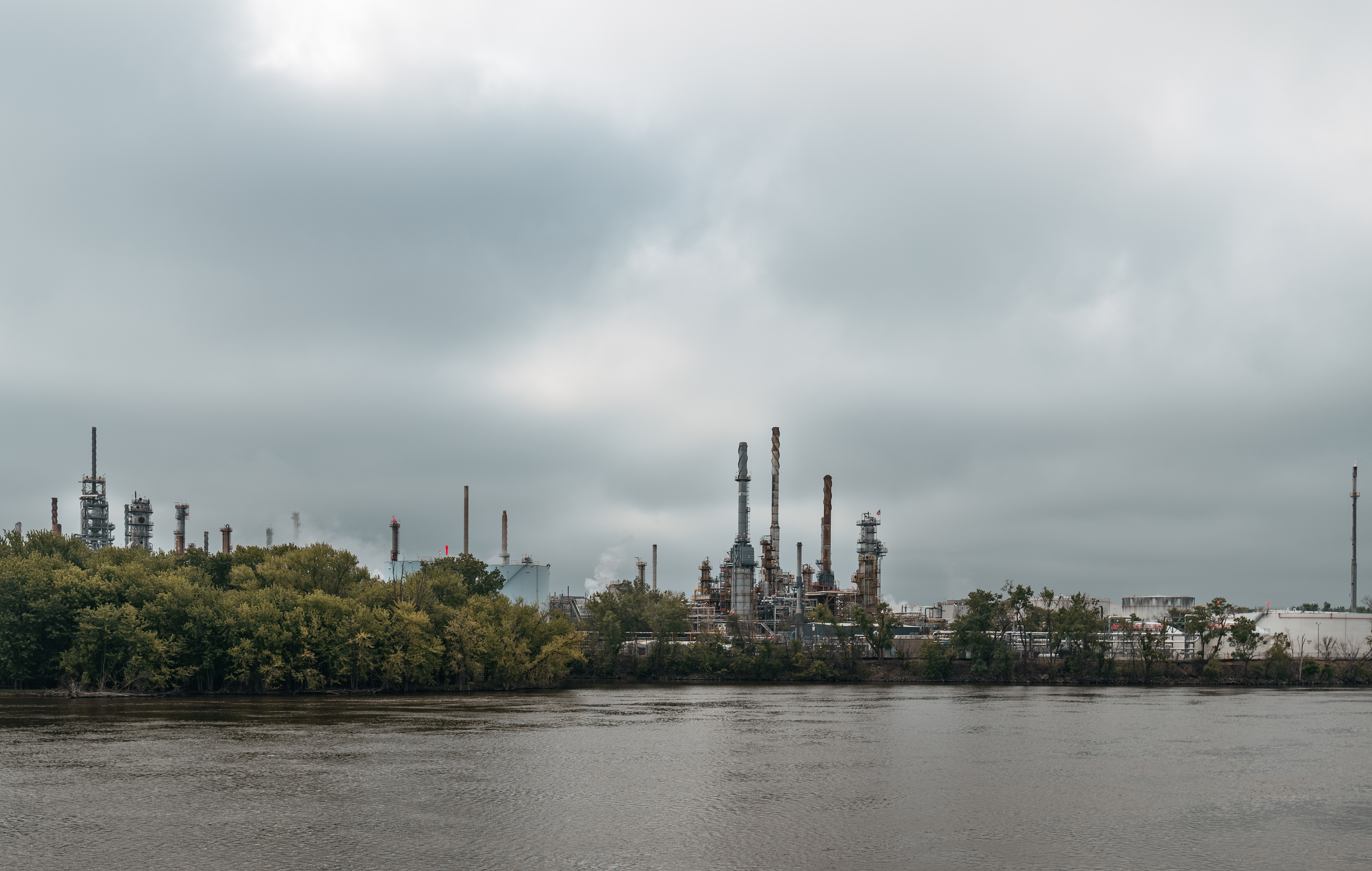
- The Marathon Petroleum-owned Saint Paul Park Refinery on the banks of the Mississippi River
- Motto: "On The Mississippi"
- Location of the city of St. Paul Park within Washington County, Minnesota
- Coordinates: 44°50′22″N 92°59′30″W
- Country: United States
- State: Minnesota
- County: Washington
- Established: 1887

Government
  - Type: Democracy
  - Mayor: Keith Franke

Area
  - Total: 3.59 sq mi (9.29 km^{2})
  - Land: 3.00 sq mi (7.76 km^{2})
  - Water: 0.59 sq mi (1.52 km^{2})
- Elevation: 748 ft (228 m)

Population (2020)
  - Total: 5,544
  - Density: 1,849.2/sq mi (713.99/km^{2})
- Time zone: UTC-6 (Central (CST))
  - Summer (DST): UTC-5 (CDT)
- ZIP code: 55071
- Area code: 651
- FIPS code: 27-58018
- GNIS feature ID: 2396516
- Website: http://stpaulpark.org/

St. Paul Park or Saint Paul Park is a city in Washington County, Minnesota, United States. The population was 5,544 at the 2020 census. It is on the east bank of the Mississippi River, five miles (8 km) downstream from St. Paul.

== Geography ==
According to the United States Census Bureau, the city has a total area of 3.58 square miles (9.27 km^{2}); 2.99 square miles (7.74 km^{2}) is land and 0.59 square miles (1.53 km^{2}) is water.

U.S. Highway 61 and U.S. Highway 10, which run concurrently through the town, serves as a main route in the community.

St. Paul Park is bordered by Cottage Grove to the east and Newport to the north.

== Economy ==
The town is home to the St. Paul Park Refinery, owned by Marathon Petroleum, which produces 106,500 barrels per day (“bpd”).

== Education ==
High School students living in St. Paul Park attend Park High School. Middle School students attend Oltman Middle School. Elementary School students attend Pullman or Pine Hill elementary School.

== Demographics ==
Historical population
| Census | Pop. | Note | %± |
|---|---|---|---|
| 1890 | 1,173 | | — |
| 1910 | 832 | | — |
| 1920 | 900 | | 8.2% |
| 1930 | 982 | | 9.1% |
| 1940 | 1,096 | | 11.6% |
| 1950 | 2,438 | | 122.4% |
| 1960 | 3,267 | | 34.0% |
| 1970 | 5,587 | | 71.0% |
| 1980 | 4,864 | | −12.9% |
| 1990 | 4,965 | | 2.1% |
| 2000 | 5,070 | | 2.1% |
| 2010 | 5,279 | | 4.1% |
| 2020 | 5,544 | | 5.0% |
U.S. Decennial Census

=== 2020 census ===
As of the 2020 census, St. Paul Park had a population of 5,544. The median age was 36.8 years. 24.4% of residents were under the age of 18 and 12.6% were 65 years of age or older. For every 100 females, there were 99.2 males, and for every 100 females age 18 and over, there were 101.8 males.

99.9% of residents lived in urban areas, while 0.1% lived in rural areas.

There were 2,044 households, of which 34.3% had children under the age of 18 living in them. Of all households, 47.0% were married-couple households, 18.9% were households with a male householder and no spouse or partner present, and 23.4% were households with a female householder and no spouse or partner present. About 22.9% of all households were made up of individuals, and 7.6% had someone living alone who was 65 years of age or older.

There were 2,110 housing units, of which 3.1% were vacant. The homeowner vacancy rate was 1.5% and the rental vacancy rate was 3.0%.

Racial composition as of the 2020 census
| Race | Number | Percent |
|---|---|---|
| White | 4,219 | 76.1% |
| Black or African American | 228 | 4.1% |
| American Indian and Alaska Native | 47 | 0.8% |
| Asian | 408 | 7.4% |
| Native Hawaiian and Other Pacific Islander | 0 | 0.0% |
| Some other race | 177 | 3.2% |
| Two or more races | 465 | 8.4% |
| Hispanic or Latino (of any race) | 453 | 8.2% |

=== 2010 census ===
As of the census of 2010, there were 5,279 people, 1,970 households, and 1,381 families residing in the city. The population density was 1,765.6 inhabitants per square mile (681.7/km^{2}). There were 2,079 housing units at an average density of 695.3 per square mile (268.5/km^{2}). The racial makeup of the city was 88.5% White, 3.3% African American, 0.5% Native American, 3.7% Asian, 1.9% from other races, and 2.1% from two or more races. Hispanic or Latino of any race were 6.3% of the population.

There were 1,970 households, of which 36.6% had children under the age of 18 living with them, 49.9% were married couples living together, 14.9% had a female householder with no husband present, 5.3% had a male householder with no wife present, and 29.9% were non-families. 21.7% of all households were made up of individuals, and 7.2% had someone living alone who was 65 years of age or older. The average household size was 2.66 and the average family size was 3.11.

The median age in the city was 34.3 years. 25.6% of residents were under the age of 18; 8.8% were between the ages of 18 and 24; 29.5% were from 25 to 44; 26.3% were from 45 to 64; and 9.9% were 65 years of age or older. The gender makeup of the city was 50.2% male and 49.8% female.

=== 2000 census ===
As of the census of 2000, there were 5,070 people, 1,829 households, and 1,344 families residing in the city. The population density was 2,131.6 inhabitants per square mile (823.0/km^{2}). There were 1,868 housing units at an average density of 785.4 per square mile (303.2/km^{2}). The racial makeup of the city was 93.87% White, 2.27% African American, 0.34% Native American, 1.10% Asian, 0.04% Pacific Islander, 0.99% from other races, and 1.40% from two or more races. Hispanic or Latino of any race were 2.78% of the population.

There were 1,829 households, out of which 38.1% had children under the age of 18 living with them, 55.7% were married couples living together, 12.5% had a female householder with no husband present, and 26.5% were non-families. 20.9% of all households were made up of individuals, and 6.3% had someone living alone who was 65 years of age or older. The average household size was 2.74 and the average family size was 3.17.

In the city, the population was spread out, with 29.1% under the age of 18, 8.1% from 18 to 24, 33.5% from 25 to 44, 19.7% from 45 to 64, and 9.6% who were 65 years of age or older. The median age was 34 years. For every 100 females, there were 98.6 males. For every 100 females age 18 and over, there were 97.9 males.

The median income for a household in the city was $50,805, and the median income for a family was $54,063. Males had a median income of $37,083 versus $29,143 for females. The per capita income for the city was $20,234. About 5.1% of families and 5.5% of the population were below the poverty line, including 7.6% of those under age 18 and 3.6% of those age 65 or over.
