= Stripes Convenience Stores =

American convenience store chain

stripes
- Type: Subsidiary
- Industry: Retail (Convenience stores)
- Founded: 1938; 88 years ago
- Headquarters: Corpus Christi, Texas, United States
- Products: Laredo Taco Company; Café de la Casa
- Revenue: ▲$ 5.8 billion (2012)
- Owner: Seven & I Holdings
- Parent: 7-Eleven
- Website: www.stripesstores.com

Stripes Stores is a chain of more than 700 convenience stores in Texas, Louisiana, New Mexico, and Oklahoma, headquartered in Corpus Christi, Texas, and owned by 7-Eleven. Most locations are former Circle K and Town & Country Food Stores. Other convenience store brands they operate under include IceBox and Quick Stuff. It is one of the largest non-refining operators of convenience stores in the United States. Many stores offer Sunoco, Chevron, Conoco, Exxon, Phillips 66, Shell, Texaco, Valero, and unbranded fuel; most locations previously sold fuel under the CITGO name, when the chain was Circle K. More than 300 locations also feature the proprietary Laredo Taco Company brand of Mexican fast food, or Country Cookin’ branded fast food.

== History ==
In 2007, the company acquired the Town & Country Food Stores chain, and, in August 2009, it acquired 25 Quick Stuff convenience stores in Texas and Louisiana from Jack in the Box Inc.

In August 2014, Stripes was acquired by Houston-based Energy Transfer Partners, the parent company of East Coast fuel brand Sunoco, when ETP bought Susser Holdings Corporation, which operated more than 580 stories at the time.

In late 2017, all Stripes locations in Louisiana and parts of Texas were sold to 7-Eleven. 7-Eleven set out to buy all the Texas, New Mexico, and Oklahoma locations as well, but could not get around a noncompete agreement with 7-Eleven franchises such as Delek US Holdings. However, 7-Eleven has since acquired the remaining Stripes locations following Delek terminating its franchising agreement and rebranding its stores as DK. The 7-Eleven brand remained in those markets through Stripes (or Speedway for El Paso, Texas stores). While Stripes is found throughout Texas and overlaps with Speedway in New Mexico and 7-Eleven in the Texas Triangle, 7-Eleven has locations in West Texas and the Texas Panhandle, but is largely absent outside the Triangle despite being based in Irving.
