= Petroleum refining in Washington =

Washington state has the fifth highest oil refining capacity of any state. As of 2018, there are 5 refineries in Washington state with a joint capacity of 637,700 b/d. They are, in order of greatest b/d capacity, Cherry Point refinery, Puget Sound refinery, Marathon Anacortes refinery, Ferndale refinery and U.S. Oil refinery.

Washington's isolation from the country's vast pipeline network and its dependence on local petroleum markets ensures the refineries are crucial for providing energy that fuels the regional economy. The location of these facilities is strategically positioned to source crude from tight oil plays in the United States, Alberta's oil sands and Alaska's North Slope to markets along the West Coast and the growing economies of Asia.

Canada, Alaska and foreign crude sources are the historic inputs for Washington's refineries. In 2011, the last full year that crude import data is available, Alaska and Canada provided the majority of crude supply to Washington State refineries, at 58 and 21.5 percent respectively. Russia was third at 8.5 percent with the remaining 12 percent received from a combination of unknown, Middle Eastern, South American and mixed origin sources in that order of significance. Washington's refineries began receiving Bakken crude in 2012.

While total refining capacity of Washington State comprises 3.4 percent of U.S. capacity, Washington accounts for only 2 percent of national petroleum consumption. This makes the state a net exporter of refined products as Washington's refineries yield more products than the population consumes. Approximately 51 percent of end products are consumed in state with the remainder going out of state and abroad. In 2011, the last year full data is available, 35 percent of finished products were exported to domestic consumers, chiefly in Oregon and California. The remaining 14 percent of output was shipped abroad with the largest share going to British Columbia.

== List of refineries ==
Refineries in Washington State
Location	Current Owner	Past Owners	Year Constructed	Major Products	Current Capacity
Ferndale	Phillips 66	ConocoPhillips, Tosco, BP, Mobil, General Petroleum	1954	Gasoline, diesel oil, jet fuel, liquid petroleum, residual fuel oil	105,000
Anacortes	Marathon	Andeavor, Tesoro, Shell Oil	1955	Gasoline, diesel oil, turbine & jet fuel, liquid petroleum gas, residual fuel oil	120,000
Anacortes	HF Sinclair	Equilon Enterprises, Shell Oil and Texaco	1957	Gasoline, diesel oil, jet fuel, propane, coke, sulfur	145,000
Tacoma	US Oil		1957	Gasoline, diesel oil, jet fuel, marine fuel, gas oils, emulsified & road asphalt	40,700
Cherry Point	BP	ARCO	1971	Gasoline, diesel oil, jet fuel, calcinated coke	227,000
Total					637,700
Total operable atmospheric crude oil distillation capacity, barrels per calendar day as of 1 January 2018. Source:

== Exports to Oregon ==
Oregon lacks any refining capacity and imports all of its petroleum products. Washington's refineries supply upwards of 90 percent of Oregon's petroleum product by way of the Olympic Pipeline and barge. Refineries in California and Utah contribute the remainder. Distribution through Oregon largely originates at Portland terminals that distribute product via tanker, truck, Columbia River barge service and the Kinder Morgan Energy Partners pipeline. The pipeline is a quasi-extension of the Olympic Pipeline that travels 115 miles from Portland to Eugene. On average, the Kinder Morgan pipeline moves 42,000 barrels of refined product per day.

== Exports to California ==
California has the third greatest refining capacity in the U.S. at 1,892,471 barrels per day. Supply and demand of refined product is tight, as the state's petroleum consumption accounts for 91 percent of its refining capacity. Washington is the marginal supplier of refined product, providing cushion for any supply and demand imbalances in California markets.

The California Reformulated Gasoline Program requires the entire state to use gasoline with minimal oxygen content that burns cleaner than conventional fuel. A number of other states are either required or opt to use reformulated gasoline in an effort to reduce smog-forming and toxic pollutants. 30 percent of U.S. gasoline is reformulated, however California's Reformulated Gasoline Program uses a proprietary blend that differs from the federal reformulated standard. While PADD I features ample production capacity for federal reformulated gasoline, the only refineries outside of California capable of producing the blend required by state law are located in Washington and the Gulf Coast . The Gulf Coast refineries haven't produced reformulated gasoline since 2011 leaving Washington as California's only out-of-state gasoline source.

== Exports to British Columbia ==
There are two refineries in British Columbia with a combined refining capacity of 67,000 b/d. Those refineries utilize domestically produced crude that travels from Edmonton to Vancouver via Kinder Morgan's 300,000 b/d Trans Mountain pipeline. The only petroleum pipeline that crosses the Rocky Mountains, the Trans Mountain is also the only North American line capable of moving both crude and refined product. Edmonton refiners supply 50 to 60 percent of product consumed in the greater Vancouver, B.C. market with the remainder sourced from the 55,000 b/d Burnaby refinery in Vancouver. Washington's refineries provide the marginal refined product after refiners in British Columbia and Alberta, acting as a supply cushion to cover shut-in capacity or demand fluctuations. Canada is a net exporter of refined product with 92 percent of those exports consumed in the U.S.
