= Petroleum refining in the United States =

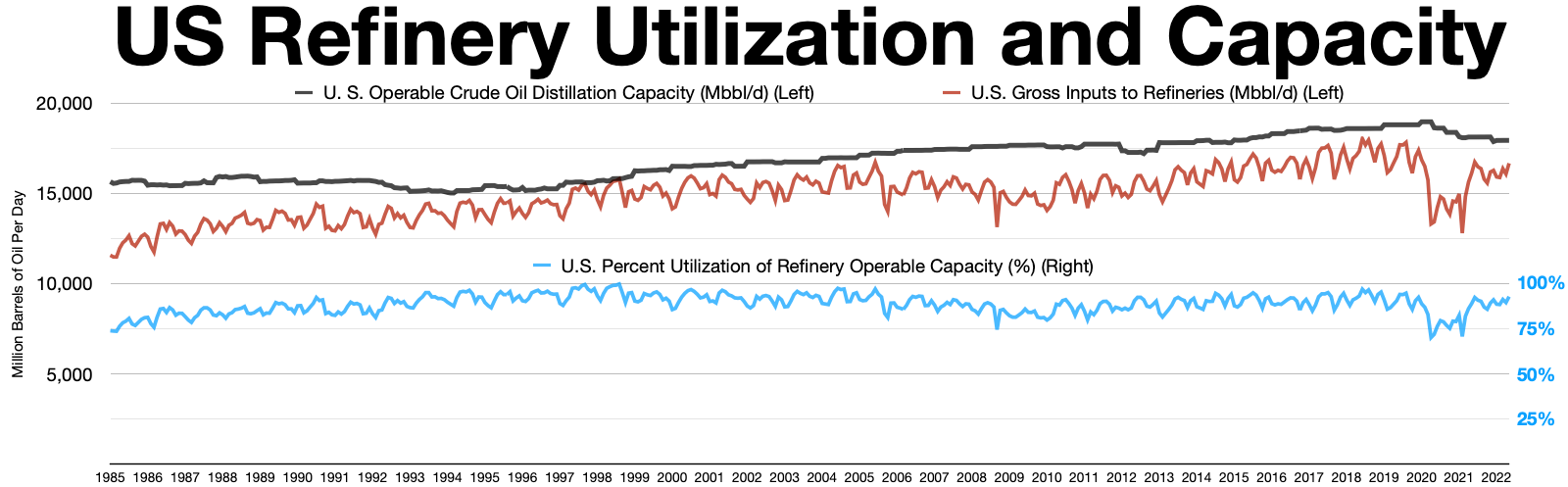
U.S. oil refinery capacity US oil refinery distillation capacity (left) Gross inputs to refineries (left) Percent utilization of refinery operable capacity (right)

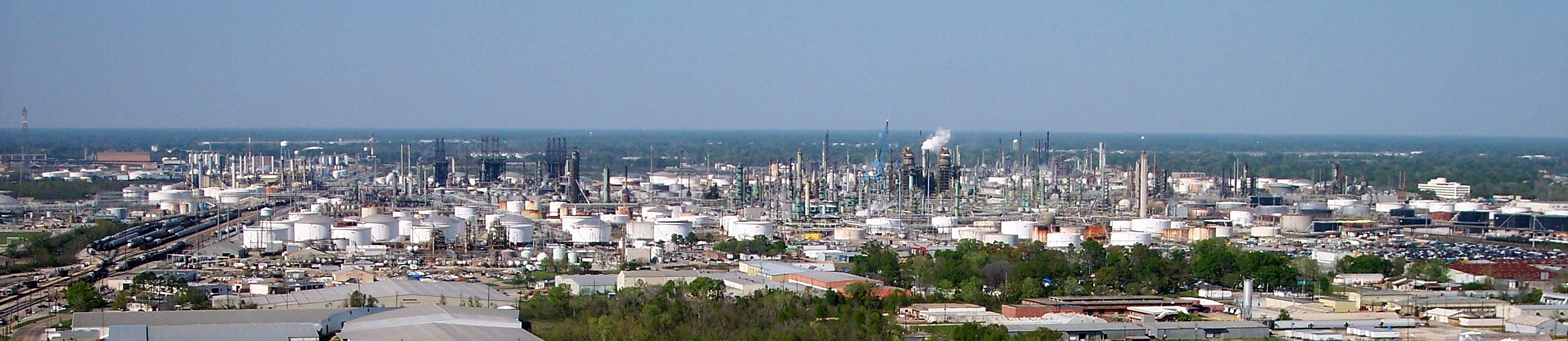
ExxonMobil's oil refinery in Baton Rouge is the sixth-largest in the United States

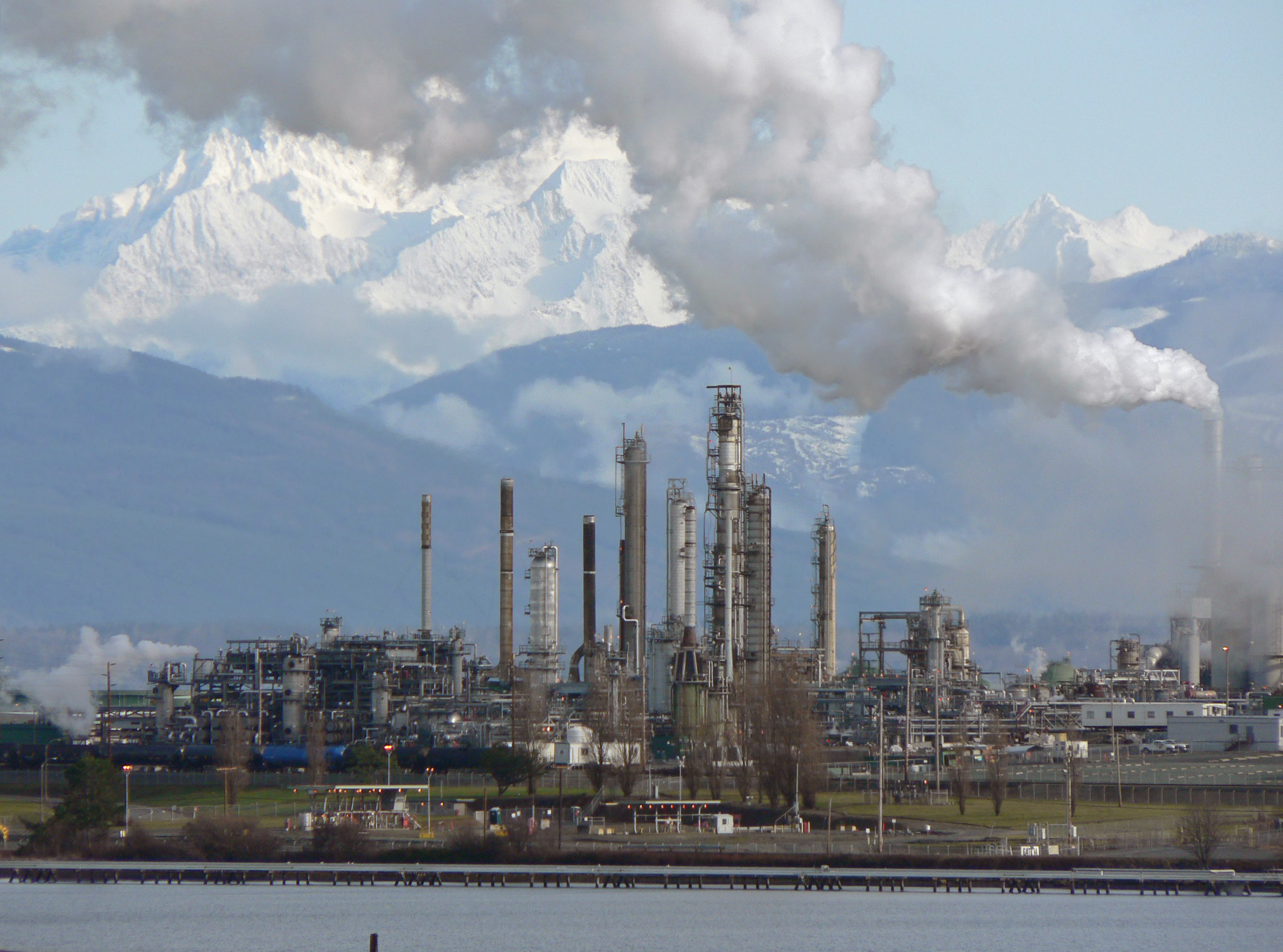
Anacortes Refinery (Marathon), on the north end of March Point southeast of Anacortes, Washington

Petroleum refining in the United States in 2024 had a capacity of 18.4 million barrels per day. Although the U.S. was the world's largest net importer of refined petroleum products as recently as 2008, the U.S. became a net exporter in 2010, and in 2014 was the largest exporter and the largest net exporter of refined petroleum. As of January 2024, there were 132 operating refineries in the US, distributed among 30 states.

Largest petroleum refining companies in the United States

Rank	Corporation	Barrels/Day	No. of US Refineries	States
1	Marathon Petroleum	2,950,000	13	AK, CA, IL, KY, LA, MI, MN, ND, OH, TX, UT, WA
2	Valero Energy	2,701,300	13	CA, LA, OK, TN, TX
3	ExxonMobil	1,947,764	4	IL, LA, TX
4	Phillips 66	1,639,548	9	CA, IL, LA, MT, NJ, OK, TX, WA
5	PBF Energy	1,042,200	7	CA, DE, LA, NJ, OH
6	Chevron	1,037,660	5	CA, MS, TX, UT
7	Citgo	804,414	3	IL, LA, TX
8	HF Sinclair	716,480	7	KS, NM, OK, UT, WA, WY
9	Koch, Inc.	673,500	2	MN, TX
10	BP	750,400	2	IN, WA
Total operable atmospheric crude oil distillation capacity as of 1 January 2024. Phillips 66 capacity includes 50% ownership of Wood River and Borger refineries. Source:

Largest petroleum refineries in the United States

Rank	Refinery	Barrels/Day	Owner	State
1	Galveston Bay Refinery	631,000	Marathon Petroleum	Texas
2	Port Arthur Refinery	626,000	Saudi Aramco (Motiva Enterprises)	Texas
3	Beaumont Refinery	609,024	ExxonMobil	Texas
4	Garyville Refinery	597,000	Marathon Petroleum	Louisiana
5	Baytown Refinery	564,400	ExxonMobil	Texas
6	Baton Rouge Refinery	522,500	ExxonMobil	Louisiana
7	Lake Charles Refinery	455,000	Citgo	Louisiana
8	Whiting Refinery	435,000	BP	Indiana
9	Los Angeles Refinery	365,000	Marathon Petroleum	California
10	Port Arthur Refinery	360,000	Valero	Texas
Total operable atmospheric crude oil distillation capacity as of 1 January 2024. Source:

== History ==
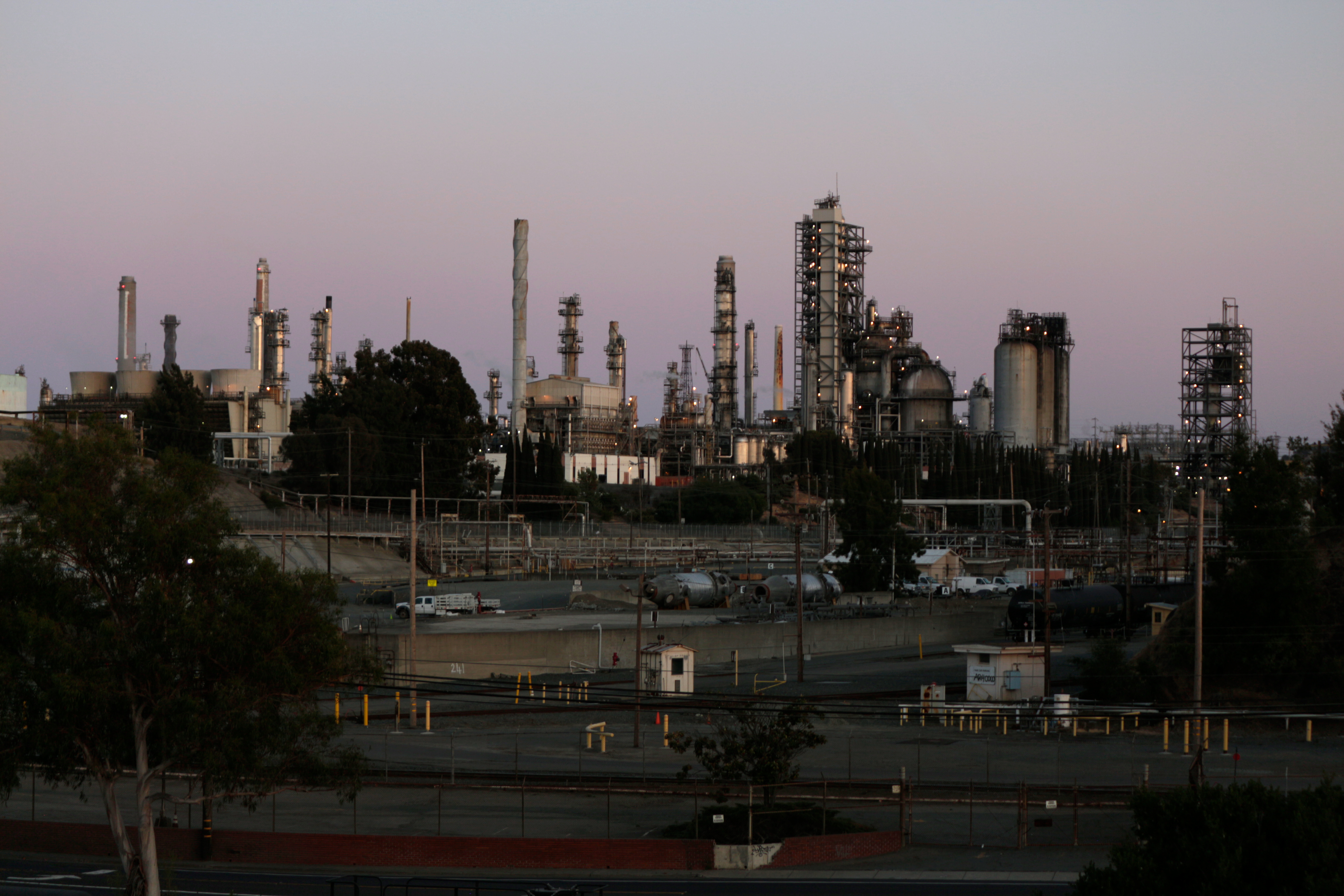
The PBF Martinez Refinery, in Martinez, California, has operated continuously since its construction in 1915.

The first known U.S. petroleum refiner was Samuel Kier of Pittsburgh, who in the 1850s produced an illuminating oil for miners' lamps.

American petroleum refining largely grew out of oil shale refining. When the Drake Well started producing in 1859, the oil shale industry was growing rapidly, and establishing refineries near cannel coal deposits along the Ohio River Valley. As oil production increased, the oil shale refiners discovered that their refining process worked just as well with petroleum, and that petroleum was a cheaper raw material than shale oil. In 1861, the existing oil shale refiners switched to petroleum feedstock, and the oil shale mines shut down.

In the 1800s, the principal refined product was kerosene for illuminating oil. The heaviest fraction was used as lubricating oil. A market developed for fuel oil as it was discovered that petroleum was superior to coal in powering the large engines of ships and railroad locomotives.

The prevalence of the automobile in the early 1900s created a mass market for gasoline, and a shortage soon developed of the lighter gasoline fractions of crude oil. The shortage was solved by the invention of fluid catalytic cracking, which broke long hydrocarbon chains into smaller molecules.

The newest large refinery built in the US was completed in 1976 in Garyville, Louisiana. Since then, while some existing refineries have expanded, new refinery construction has faced significant barriers in environmental regulation, permitting, and local political opposition. Industrial accidents such as the 2019 Philadelphia Energy Solutions refinery explosion have led to refinery closures which reversed some of the gains made through expansion of refineries.

== Geography ==
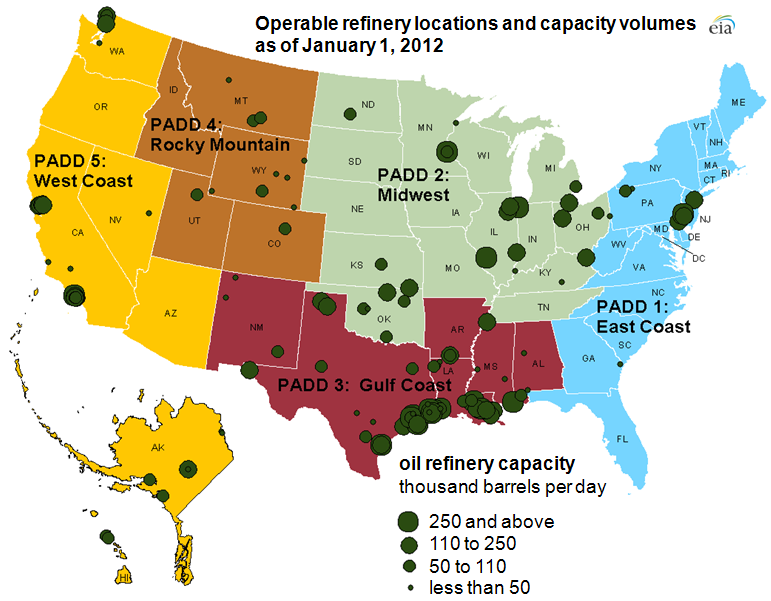
USEIA - Map of US Oil Refineries in 2012

Most large refineries are near navigable waterways, especially seaports or Great Lakes ports. The single largest concentration of refineries is along the Gulf Coast. Although there are refineries in 30 states, just three states dominate US refining: Texas (47 operating refineries), Louisiana (19), and California (18). As of January 2015, these three states contain 45% of all US refineries and 59% of all US refining capacity.

== Products ==
The three largest-volume products of US refineries are gasoline, fuel oil (including diesel fuel and home heating oil), and aviation fuel, which together make up more than 84 percent of output.

=== Byproduct sulfur ===
Petroleum refineries recover elemental sulfur as a byproduct. In 2012, US oil refineries recovered 7.4 million metric tons of sulfur, worth about $915 million, and amounting to 88% of the elemental sulfur produced in the US. Sulfur removal (as well as other contaminants) was a key theme of US refinery investment during 1990 to 2017 leading to additional sulfur production. New sulfur regulations enacted by the EPA have steadily reduced sulfur content. Since 2006, ultralow sulfur diesel with a maximum sulfur content of 15 ppm has been standard for on-road vehicles, extended to non-road vehicles in 2010, and to locomotives and marine vessels by 2012. Starting in January 2017, gasoline has been limited to an annual average of 10 ppm sulfur, with a maximum of 80 ppm allowed per batch at the refinery gate and up to 95 ppm downstream. At this point, nearly all road and industrial fuels produced in the US have been substantially desulfurized to levels of 15 parts per million or less.

== International trade ==
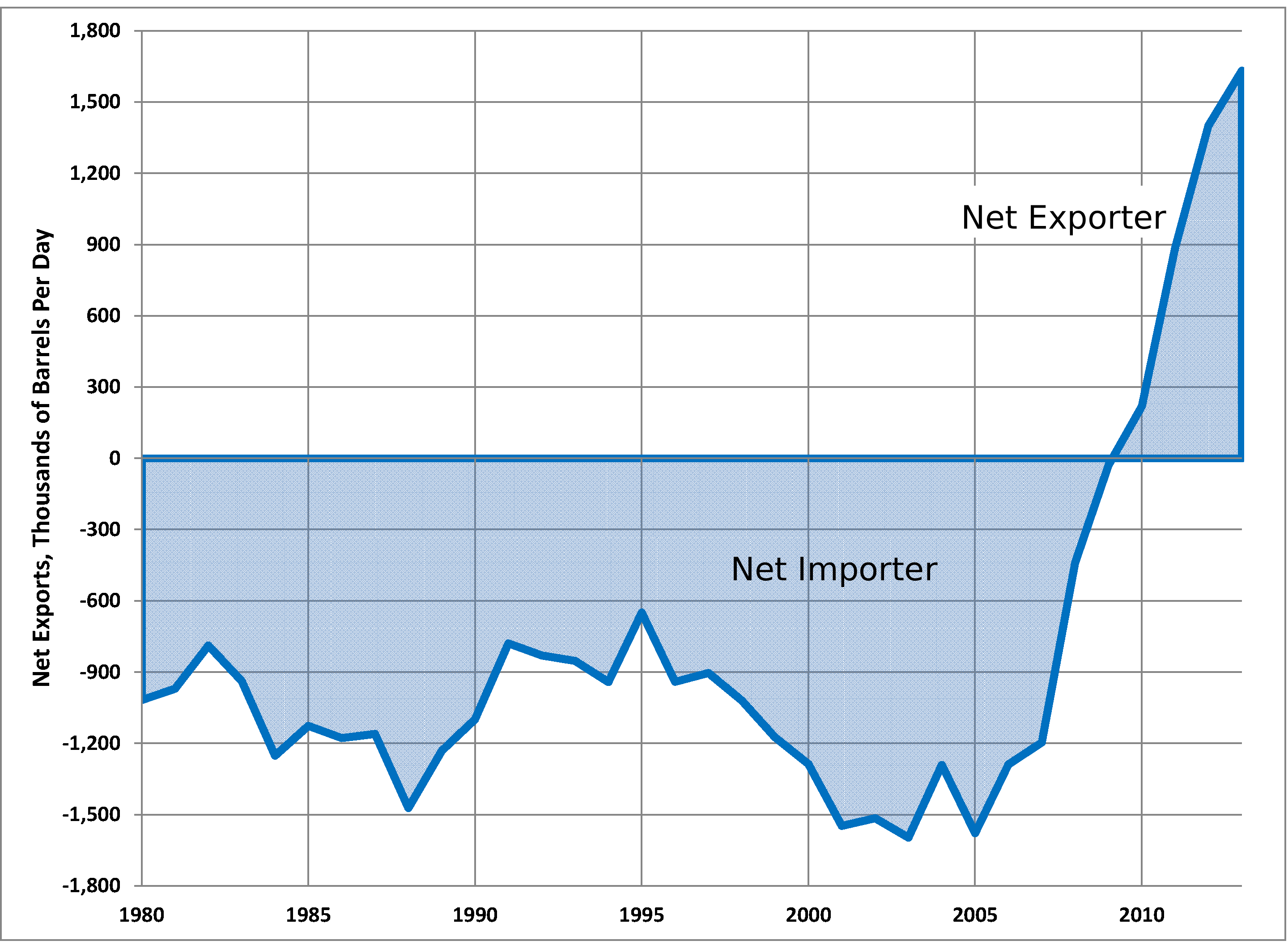
U.S. exports minus imports (net exports) of refined petroleum products, 1980-2013. Data from OPEC

Up until 2008, the United States was for decades the world's largest net importer of refined petroleum products. But the situation quickly changed in 2008 as American refineries became much more cost-competitive due to large increases in US production of oil, natural gas, and natural gas liquids. The US became a net exporter of refined petroleum in 2010, and since 2013 has been the world's largest net exporter of refined petroleum. In 2014, the US exported 3.83 million barrels per day and imported 1.35 million barrels per day of refined petroleum, for net exports of 2.48 million barrels per day. The largest net importers of US refined products in 2017 were, in descending order: Mexico, Brazil, Japan, China, and Singapore.

The competitive advantage of US refiners has been attributed to the lower price of American crude oil, as reflected by the Oklahoma-based index price West Texas Intermediate, versus the more expensive European-based index price Brent Crude. Due to the great surge in American production of oil, natural gas, and natural gas liquids since 2008, those products have been cheaper in the North American market than worldwide, giving American refiners a major cost advantage. The discount on US crude is partially attributed to the long-standing federal ban on exports of American crude oil.

European Union refiners have been hard-hit by the growth in US exports. They lost much of their previous gasoline exports to the US, and also market share in the worldwide market to the newly competitive US refineries. In addition, US refineries have increasingly exported petroleum products to the EU. In 2008, US exports of gas oil (home heating fuel) surged to a 31% market share in the EU, up from 5% the previous year; in 2011, US imports held a 37% market share of gasoil in the EU. There has been discussion that EU refineries would have to shut down without government intervention.

== Environmental impact ==
Refineries cause water pollution, air pollution, and soil pollution in the United States. Some former refinery sites are Superfund sites such as the Diamond Head Oil Refinery Superfund Site in Kearny, New Jersey. Refineries have paid millions of dollars in settlements and fines for violations of environmental laws. Some settlements have included promises to reduce toxic emissions.

Major refinery fires include the 1956 McKee refinery fire, the 1975 Philadelphia Gulf refinery fire and 2005 Texas City refinery explosion.
