= San Francisco Plantation House =

Historic house in Louisiana, United States

- U.S. National Register of Historic Places
- U.S. National Historic Landmark
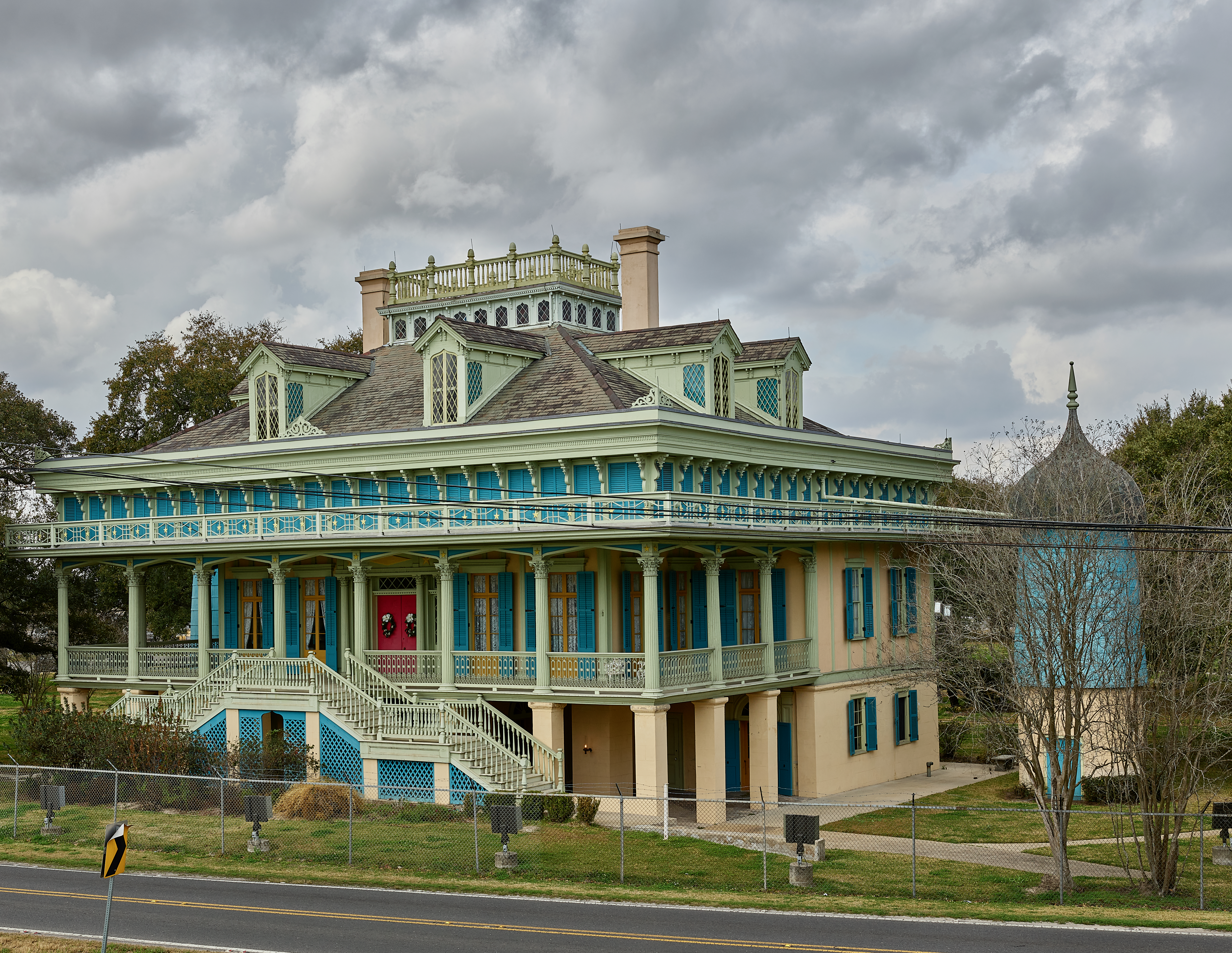

- Location within Louisiana Location within the United States
- Location: 2646 Louisiana Highway 44, Garyville, Louisiana, U.S.
- Coordinates: 30°2′56.88″N 90°36′20″W
- Area: 8 acres (3.2 ha)
- Built: 1856
- Architectural style: Gothic
- NRHP reference No.: 74002186

Significant dates
- Added to NRHP: May 30, 1974
- Designated NHL: May 30, 1974

San Francisco Plantation House is a historic plantation house in Reserve, St. John the Baptist Parish, Louisiana. Built in 1853–1856, it is one of the most architecturally distinctive plantation houses in the American South. It was declared a National Historic Landmark in 1974. It is on the property of the Garyville Refinery.

== Description and history ==
The San Francisco Plantation House is located on the north bank of the Mississippi River, separated from the river by Louisiana Highway 44 and a levee. The house stands on about 8 acres (3.2 ha) of land, now surrounded by a farm of oil tanks. It is a 1 1/2-story structure, set on a full-height basement. The basement has a brick floor, reportedly 6 feet (1.8 m) deep, with brick piers rising to support the main structure. Side-facing divided staircases lead to the main floor, which is sheltered on three sides by an ornate porch, supported by fluted columns with iron Corinthian capitals. It has deeply overhanging decorative cornice, which in profile gives the house a styling called "Steamboat Gothic". The house is topped by a dormered hip roof. The interior is also richly decorated, with paintings attributed to New Orleans artist Dominique Canova on ceiling and door panels.

The house is traditionally ascribed a construction date of 1853–1856, and may include elements of an older building. It was built for Edmond Marmillion. The unusual name “San Francisco” is believed to be derived from Edmond's oldest surviving son, Valsin's comment about the extraordinary debt he was confronted with when taking over the estate. He declared he was sans fruscins or “without a penny in my pocket.” The name evolved into St. Frusquin and, in 1879, was changed into “San Francisco” by the next owner, Achille D. Bougère. It is owned by Marathon Petroleum Corporation, which acquired the property when it bought the Garyville Refinery in the mid-1970s. It was open as a museum and event facility until 2022.

== See also ==
- List of National Historic Landmarks in Louisiana
- National Register of Historic Places listings in St. John the Baptist Parish, Louisiana
- Frances Parkinson Keyes (1885–1970), author of a novel called Steamboat Gothic
