= FTO =

FTO may refer to:

- Face Turning Octahedron
- Field training officer
- Fluorine-doped tin oxide (SnO_{2}:F)
- Foreign Terrorist Organisation, term used in the U.S. State Department list of Foreign Terrorist Organizations
- Freedom to operate
- Frontier Oil, a defunct American oil company that traded on the NYSE as FTO
- FTO, initialism used for the New South Wales Film and Television Office, former name of Screen NSW
- FTO gene, a fat mass and obesity-associated protein
- Mitsubishi FTO, an automobile
