= Paul B. Loyd Jr. =

American businessman

Paul B. Loyd Jr. (born 1946) is an American businessman. From 1997 to 2001, he was chairman and chief executive officer of the R&B Falcon Corporation, the world's largest offshore drilling company, until it merged with Transocean. Transocean has named a semi-submersible after him.

== Early life ==
He graduated from Southern Methodist University in Dallas, Texas with a Bachelor of Business Administration in Economics in 1968, where he played on the football team. He played in the 1966 Southwest Conference for SMU in 1966. In 1967, he was elected captain of the SMU football team and played in the Cotton Bowl Classic. He later received an M.B.A. from the Harvard Business School.

== Career ==
He was assistant to the president of Atwood Oceanics, president of Griffin-Alexander Company, and chief executive officer of Chiles-Alexander International. From April 1991 to December 1997, he was chairman and CEO of the Reading & Bates Corporation. From December 1997 to January 2001, he was chairman and CEO of R&B Falcon Corporation until its merger with Transocean.

He was a consultant to the Government of Saudi Arabia. He is the founder and principal of Loyd & Associates, an investment company focusing on the energy industry, since 1989. He was a member of the board of directors of Enterprise Oil until its merger with Royal Dutch Shell in 2002, and of Vetco until its merger with General Electric in 2007. He was a member of the board of directors of Frontier Oil from 1994 to 2011, when it merged with HollyFrontier, where he is on the board. He also was a member of the board of directors of Carrizo Oil & Gas. He has been an executive-in-residence of J.P. Morgan Capital Partners since 2002.

He sits on the board of trustees of his alma mater, Southern Methodist University, and the executive board of the Cox School of Business.

== Philanthropy ==
In 2012, he donated US$5 million to SMU for the construction of new student housing building, called Loyd Commons. Prior to that, he donated the Paul B. Loyd Jr. All Sports Center. He also was on the board of trustees of the Houston Children's Charity and the Boys & Girls Clubs of America for American Samoa. His wife, Penny, chairs the Marshall Plan Charities for Afghanistan and is on the advisory board of Boys and Girls Clubs.

Loyd played a role in the 2021–2024 NCAA conference realignment from the American Athletic Conference to the Atlantic Coast Conference (ACC). He was one of a group of roughly 15 boosters who committed to donating enough to the SMU athletic program to allow the school to forego any ACC media revenue for its first nine years as an ACC member.

== Personal life ==
He is married to Penny Requa Loyd and they have 5 children and reside in Houston.
