= Cherry Point =

Cherry Point may refer to:

- Marine Corps Air Station Cherry Point, a military airfield in North Carolina
- Cherry Point Refinery, a headland and oil refinery in Washington State
