= USA Gasoline =

American oil company

- A USA Gasoline gas station in Los Angeles
- Company type: Private (subsidiary of Marathon Petroleum)
- Industry: Oil & Gas Extraction
- Founded: 1968
- Headquarters: Agoura Hills, California, United States
- Area served: United States
- Products: Oil & Gasoline
- Parent: Marathon Petroleum

U Save Automatic (also known as USA Gasoline or USA Petroleum) is an American oil company which operates in the United States. It was founded as Skypower Gasoline by Peter Moller and his sons Poul, Finn and John and changed the name to USA Gasoline in 1968. USA Gasoline operated in 10 states, including Alaska, California, Colorado, Idaho, Nevada, New Mexico, Oregon, Utah, Washington, and Wyoming. It became a subsidiary of Tesoro Corporation in 2007, later renamed Andeavor in 2017, which was, in turn, acquired by Marathon Petroleum in 2018.

As of 2025, the remaining USA Gasoline locations are primarily located in Southern California.

== History ==
1970s

In the 1970s, USA Gasoline became the first gasoline retailer to experiment with self-service pay at the pump technology and entered into an agreement with Allstate Bank of Southern California allowing banking customers to automatically debit their accounts directly from the pump.

- Over the course of 1975 and 1976, all UCO stations became USA Gasoline stations.
- Over the course of 1976-1977, all Sears stations became USA Gasoline stations.

1980s + 1990s

- From 1988 to 1990, USA Petroleum was involved in a lawsuit with ARCO due to fuel prices.
- in 1992, USA Petroleum moved its headquarters from Santa Monica to Ventura.
- in 1993, their headquarters were moved again, this time from Ventura to Agoura Hills.
- in 1994, Marvin Jay Caukin, the ex-Director of Finance, was sentenced to 33 months in prison for embezzling nearly $2.4 million from the company.

2000s

- in 2003, USA Petroleum agreed to pay $325,000 to settle a dispute regarding leaking tanks causing groundwater and soil pollution at 10 USA Gasoline stations in Ventura County.
- in July 2006, USA Petroleum announced its plan to sell 122 of its California gas stations to Chevron. The deal was finalized in November.
- in 2007, Tesoro Corp acquired USA Gasoline, and approximately 140 retail stations.

2010s + 2020s

- in 2011, 51 Albertsons Express stores rebranded as USA Gasoline. As part of the deal, all Mirastar stations (which were typically located outside select Walmart locations) were also rebranded as USA Gasoline.
- in 2012, 250 ARCO (Thrifty-style stations) and Thrifty Oil stations rebranded as USA Gasoline, because BP did not renew the leases for 250 ARCO or Thrifty stations.
- In 2019, after the acquisition of USA Gasoline’s parent company Andeavor by Marathon Petroleum, many USA Gasoline locations were (as of 2020) in the process of being rebranded to Marathon's now-former subsidiary, Speedway, now wholly owned and operated by 7-Eleven. Some USA Gasoline locations that either lacked a convenience store or were deemed insufficient to operate as a regular Speedway were rebranded as Speedway Express, a branded concept similar to Rich, a brand of Speedway that operates lower-volume stores that typically only sell tobacco, snacks, and drinks inside the convenience store (or a booth if no convenience store exists). Like Rich, Speedway Express does not participate in Speedway's Speedy Rewards program. The program is limited to participating regular Speedway branded sites.
- As of 2025, a number of USA Gasoline stations remain in Southern California that have not converted to either a Speedway or Speedway Express, possibly due in part of 7-Eleven's acquisition of Speedway from Marathon in 2021. As a result, many locations were updated with red tones matching that of Speedway but continued to operate under the USA Gasoline brand. In Wyoming, the last remaining USA Gasoline stations, which were conversions of former first-generation Albertsons Express stores, have shuttered.

== See also ==
- Gas stations in the United States
- Oil companies of the United States
- Petroleum in California
