= Ferndale Refinery =

Oil refinery in Washington, United States

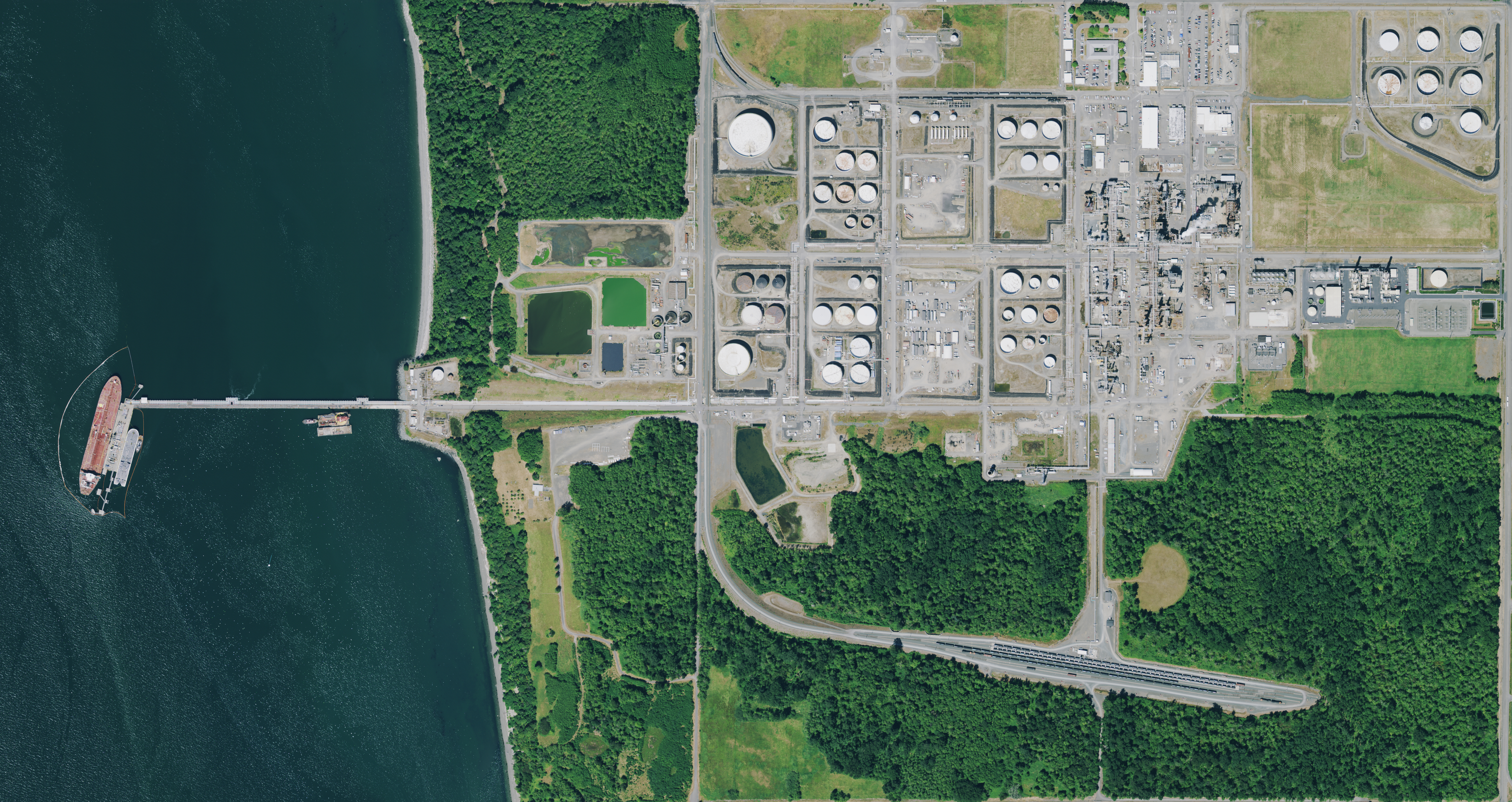
- Aerial view of the refinery. The main entrance is to the north, Watco's train yard is south, the dock is west, and the PSE cogeneration plant is east.

- Location within Washington (state) Location within the United States
- Location: Ferndale, Washington, United States; 48.830°N 122.694°W

Refinery details
- Owners: Phillips 66 (2001–present); Tosco (1993–2001); BP (1988–1993); Mobil (1954–1988)
- Opened: 1954; 72 years ago
- Capacity: 101,000 barrels per day (16,100 m^{3}/d)

The Ferndale Refinery is an oil refinery near Ferndale, Washington, United States, that is owned by Phillips 66. It is located in the Cherry Point Industrial Zone west of Ferndale and had a capacity of 101,000 barrels per day in 2015, 64th largest in the nation. The Ferndale Refinery produces predominantly transportation fuels consumed in local markets and also includes secondary processing facilities such as a fluid catalytic cracker, an alkylation unit, hydrotreating units, and a naphtha reformer. The plant follows a 10-5-3-2 crack spread, meaning that for ten barrels of crude feedstock, the refinery produces five barrels of gasoline, three barrels of distillate, and two barrels of fuel oil.

About one hundred miles (160 km) north of Seattle, the Ferndale Refinery was the first of five refineries in Washington. Built by General Petroleum Corp in 1954, its original capacity was rated at 35,000 barrels per stream day. General Petroleum was a subsidiary of Socony (Standard Oil Company of New York) and was integrated into Mobil Chemical Co when the company formed in 1960.

BP took control of the refinery in 1988 when its wholly owned subsidiary Sohio received the plant from Mobil Oil in exchange for $152.5 million and crude oil inventories.

In 1993, Tosco Corp, a California-based downstream and marketing corporation, bought the refinery from BP. The deal included BP’s retail stations and marketing assets across Washington and Oregon.

Phillips Petroleum Company purchased Tosco for $7 billion in February 2001, and assumed control of the refinery thereafter. With the deal’s close, Phillips became the second largest refiner in the U.S. and obtained refineries on both coasts. Even after the Tosco purchase, Phillips sought further expansion. Phillips and Conoco announced a merger in November 2001, forming ConocoPhillips, the new controlling entity of the Ferndale Refinery. This new supermajor boasted the nation's largest downstream system (as of 2001). In 2012 ConocoPhillips spun off its downstream and midstream assets as a new independent energy company, Phillips 66, which still operates the Ferndale Refinery. ConocoPhillips became the second company to abandon the vertically integrated model, following Marathon Oil Corporation’s decision to spin off its downstream assets in 2011.

The Ferndale refinery receives a portion of its crude oil from the Amazon River Basin of South America, a concern of many environmentalists. In 2015, it was refining 989 barrels per day of oil from the Amazon.

== See also ==
- Petroleum refining in Washington state
- Cherry Point Refinery
- Shell Anacortes Refinery
