= Paul Lloyd =

Paul Lloyd may refer to:

- Paul Lloyd (boxer) (1968–2026), English boxer
- Paul Lloyd (footballer) (born 1987), English football midfielder
- Paul Lloyd (RAF officer)
- P. J. Black (Phillip Paul Lloyd, born 1981), South African professional wrestler

== See also ==
- Paul B. Loyd Jr., American businessman
