= Robert Van Osdell West Jr. =

American oil and gas entrepreneur

Robert Van Osdell West Jr. was an American entrepreneur engaged in the oil and gas business. He is noted for founding the American energy company Tesoro Petroleum Corporation. West was also an explorer and was part of those who discovered the Bob West Field, one of the largest gas field discoveries during the 1990s.

== Biography ==
West was born in Kansas City, Missouri but he grew up in Tulsa, Oklahoma. His early education was completed at Cascia Hall Preparatory School. He then obtained a Bachelor of Science degree in Chemical Engineering in 1942 from the University of Texas at Austin where he later completed his doctorate degree in chemical and petroleum engineering.

=== Career ===
West spent his entire career working in the petroleum industry. He then rose from the ranks to become the president of Texstar Corporation, the consolidated company of Tom Slick's various investments and gas and petroleum properties. In 1964, West founded Tesoro as a spinoff of Textar Petroleum. The firm, which was based in San Antonio, Texas, began as a small regional firm. According to West he was expected to fail due to the lack of capitalization. Tesoro began with $1,000 investment. When Tom Slick, the owner of Texstar Corporation died, West persuaded his executor to sell the company to him. Using a $6.5 million loan, he purchased and merged Texstar into Tesoro. To stabilize the company, West found two more publicly traded companies - Intex Oil company and Sioux Oil Company - and merged them with his company to form the new Tesoro in 1968.

Under his leadership, Tesoro discovered the Bob West Field in 1990. This oil field, which is located in Starr county, Texas Railroad Commission District 4, is one of the largest gas field discoveries in the past three decades.

=== Controversy ===
West had been involved in an attempt to bribe a Trinidad and Tobago finance minister by soliciting the services of a prostitute after the state announced that it was considering a tax policy that would have affected Tesoro’s business. By 1985, West claimed that Tesoro’s joint venture with the government of Trinidad and Tobago could face a write-down in the latter’s attempt to confiscate the company.

West died on November 16, 2006, due to respiratory failure.
