= Cherry Point Refinery =

Oil refinery in Blaine, Washington, United States

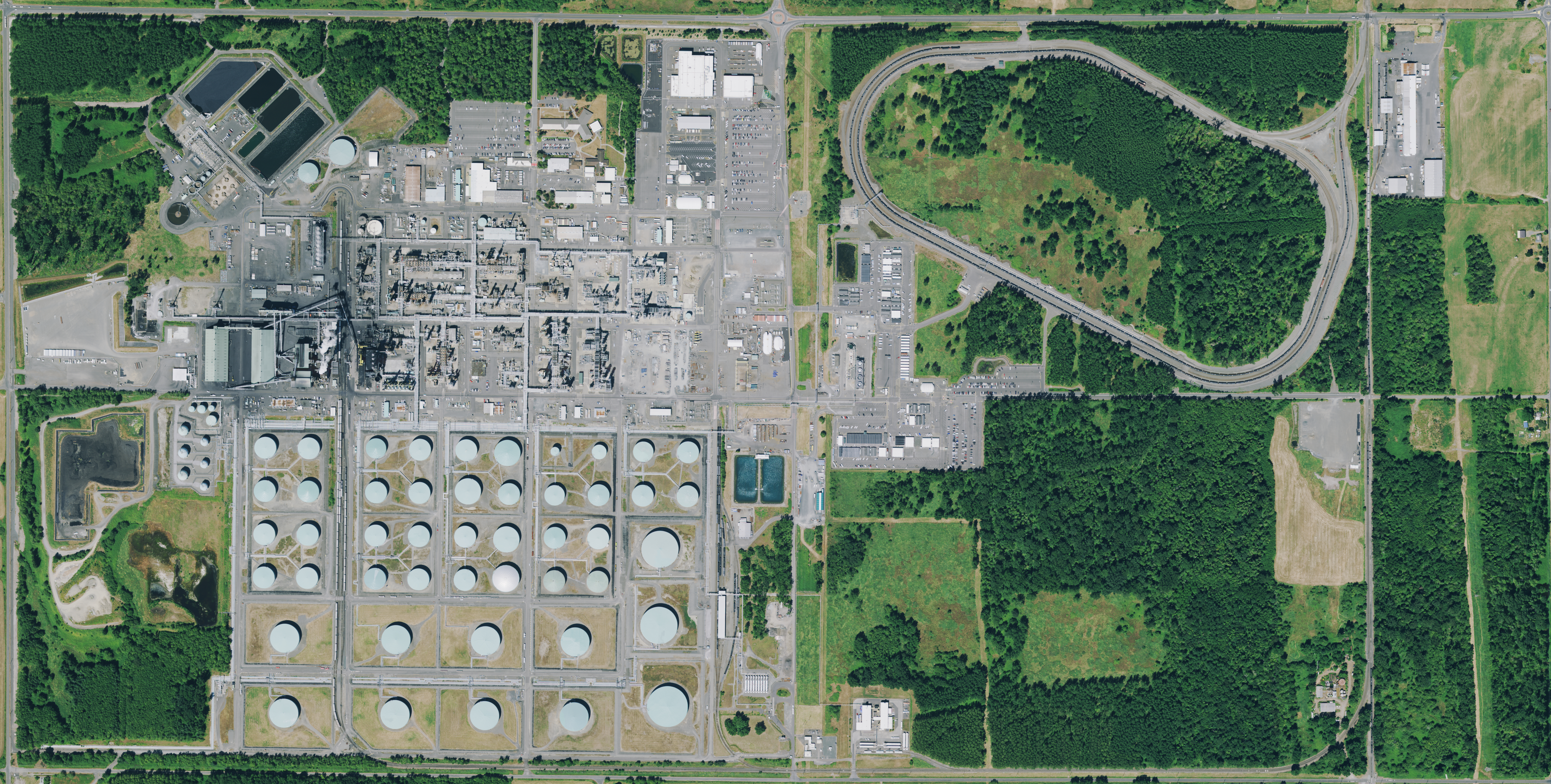
- An aerial photo of the Cherry Point Refinery in 2022

- Location within Washington (state) Location within the United States
- Location: Blaine, Washington, United States; 48.885°N 122.738°W

Refinery details
- Owners: BP (2002–present); ARCO (1971–2002)
- Opened: 1971; 55 years ago
- Capacity: 225,000 barrels per day (35,800 m^{3}/d)

The Cherry Point Refinery is an oil refinery near Bellingham, Washington, north of Seattle in the United States. Owned by BP, is the largest refinery in Washington state (and was the 30th largest in the U.S. in 2015). It is located about seven miles (11 km) south of Blaine and eight miles (13 km) northwest of Ferndale, a few miles south of the Canada–US border, on the Strait of Georgia between Birch Bay and Lummi Bay.

Completed in 1971, its design and construction was overseen by George W. Glade, CEO and President of Parsons Constructors, Inc., a wholly owned subsidiary of the Ralph M. Parsons Company. It is the fourth largest refinery on the West Coast, and one of the last major oil refineries built in the United States. The Cherry Point refinery supplies about 20% of the gasoline in Washington state.

Originally an Atlantic Richfield (ARCO) facility, the refinery became a BP operation 24 years ago in January 2002, following BP's April 2000 purchase of ARCO. The refinery was initially planned to be built closer to Seattle, at Kayak Point, northwest of Everett, but Atlantic Richfield abandoned those plans in October 1968 and built the facility at Cherry Point.

When first operational, Cherry Point had a capacity of about 100,000 barrels (16,000 m^{3}); it currently processes over 225,000 barrels (35,800 m^{3}) of petroleum (crude oil) per day, with 90% becoming gasoline, diesel or jet fuel. It covers about 3,300 acres (5.2 sq mi; 13 km^{2}).

Most of Cherry Point's crude oil is from the Alaska North Slope. It is brought in by petroleum tankers via the Strait of Juan de Fuca and Rosario Strait and delivered directly to the refinery via the facility's tanker pier near a minor headland called Cherry Point, on the Strait of Georgia. The refinery received the first oil through the Trans-Alaska Pipeline, transported aboard the ARCO Juneau, in early August 1977.

The remainder of the crude comes from a pipeline connected to reserves in Western Canada. In January 2014 the refinery finished construction of a rail facility to import Bakken crude from North Dakota.

The gasoline and diesel are primarily shipped to filling stations in Washington and Oregon via the Olympic Pipeline and over-the-road fuel trucks. Jet fuel from Cherry Point Refinery accounts for 85% of the fuel used by the Seattle-Tacoma International Airport. Significant quantities of calcined coke are also produced and shipped to the nearby ALCOA aluminium smelter.

A fire in February 2012 caused the plant to be shut down for several weeks.

== Proposed expansion ==
A coal export facility known as the Gateway Pacific Terminal was proposed to be built here. The proposal was strongly opposed by the Lummi Nation, who argued that the proposal infringed on their rights under the Treaty of Point Elliott, and that it would have destroyed the local ecosystems of the local fisheries. The project was also opposed by the Sightline Institute and the Sierra Club's Beyond Coal campaign. On May 9, 2016, the United States Army Corps of Engineers denied a permit to the project, citing the Lummi Nation's treaty-protected fishing rights. On July 27, 2021, the Whatcom County Council voted unanimously to ban new refineries, shipping terminals, or coal-fired power plants at Cherry Point.

In December 2023, BP finalized its purchase of 1,100 acres (450 ha) near Cherry Point from a subsidiary of SSA Marine for $50 million to be used as a buffer for their refinery. The purchase was opposed by the Lummi Nation due to its potential encroachment of the historic Xwe’chi’eXen site, a gathering place for the Lummi people for thousands of years.

== See also ==
- Petroleum refining in Washington state
- Ferndale Refinery
- Shell Anacortes Refinery
