= El Dorado Refinery =

Oil refinery in Kansas, United States

The El Dorado Refinery is located in El Dorado, Kansas, United States. It is run by HollyFrontier and has a crude distillation unit with a capacity of 135,000 barrels per day (21,500 m^{3}/d).

== See also ==
- Oil refinery
- Petroleum
- List of oil refineries
