= Galveston Bay Refinery =

Oil refinery in Texas, US

- Location of the Galveston Bay Refinery in Texas City, United States
- Location: Texas City, Texas, Texas, United States; 29°22.65′N 94°55.97′W

Refinery details
- Owner: Marathon Petroleum Corporation 2013–present
- Opened: 1933; 93 years ago
- Capacity: 631,000 barrels per day (100,300 m^{3}/d)
- Complexity index: 15.2
- No. of employees: 1550

The Galveston Bay Refinery is an oil refinery located in the Texas City, Texas Industrial Complex on the edge of Galveston Bay. It has been owned and operated by Marathon Petroleum Corporation since 2013.

== History ==
The refinery was established in 1933 as Pan American Refining Corporation. Pan American refining was renamed to American Oil Company in 1954. American Oil Company merged with Standard Oil Company of Indiana to form Amoco Corporation in 1985. Amoco Corporation merged with BP and became BP Amoco PLC (Public Limited Company) in 1998. In 2001 BP Amoco PLC was renamed to BP PLC.

Marathon Petroleum purchased its original 84,000 bpd Texas City Refinery from Plymouth Oil Company in 1962. What remains operating today is an integrated part of the Galveston Bay Refinery, nicknamed Bay Plant. It was established in 1931 by Republic Oil Refining Company and sold to Plymouth Oil Company in 1957.

In 2005, the refinery could produce around 10 million gallons of gasoline per day. It also produced jet fuels, diesel fuels, and chemical feed stocks. Its 1,200-acre (490 ha) site was covered by 29 oil refining units and four chemical units. It employed around 1,800 BP workers.

In February 2013, Marathon Petroleum acquired the Galveston Bay refinery from BP along with other assets. In 2018, Marathon merged its Texas City Refinery with the Galveston Bay facility to form a single refining complex.

== Environmental record ==
An issue Galveston Bay dealt with in 2021, was that at the time it was the greatest emitter of benzene among all U.S. refineries.
