= Garyville Refinery =

3rd largest American oil refinery

- Location of the Garyville Refinery in Louisiana, United States
- Location: Garyville, Louisiana, United States; 30°03′35″N 90°35′53″W

Refinery details
- Owner: Marathon Petroleum Corporation
- Opened: 1976
- Capacity: 597,000 barrels per day (94,900 m^{3}/d)
- No. of employees: 900

The Garyville Refinery is the 4th largest American oil refinery with a nameplate capacity of 597,000 barrels per day (94,900 m^{3}/d). The refinery is owned and operated by Marathon Petroleum Corporation. It is located in southeastern Louisiana between New Orleans and Baton Rouge on U.S. Route 61 in Garyville, Louisiana. The facility is the newest major grassroots refinery built in the United States, located on 3,500 acres of land adjacent to the Mississippi River. The refinery is on the former San Francisco Plantation property, which was designated a National Historic Landmark in 1974.

Construction began in 1973 by ECOL, Ltd. Construction was completed in 1976, and the refinery was purchased by Marathon Oil Company. Since then, the refinery has been expanded on multiple occasions, most recently with the $3.9 billion Garyville Major Expansion (GME) Project, completed in 2009. This, along with subsequent debottlenecking, increased capacity by 234,000 barrels per day (37,200 m^{3}/d).

Garyville Refinery operations consist of crude distillation, hydrocracking, catalytic cracking, hydrotreating, catalytic reforming, alkylation, sulfur recovery, and coking. The facility primarily processes heavy sour crude oils to produce gasoline, diesel, asphalt, propylene, isobutane, propane, fuel-grade coke, and sulfur. Feedstocks are supplied via pipeline, truck, barge, rail, and ocean tanker.

The refinery employs 900 employees and 600 contract workers.

== Refinery Fire ==
NOAA tracking of Garyville Refinery Fire

On August 25, 2023, a naphtha storage tank within the Garyville Refinery caught fire following a 13-hour-long naphtha leak. The fire later spread to an adjacent storage tank for diesel fuel. Fires at the facility burned for three days. At around 7:40 AM, Louisiana Department of Environmental Quality Monitoring recorded a alarmingly high reading of toxin in the air, but residents were not notified. Despite repeated 911 calls, residents were not told to take action until hours later. It is the largest accidental release of flammable chemicals in the US since monitoring began by the EPA in 1994.

St. John Parish issued an two-mile evacuation order on the first day of the fire, around 10:57 AM, leading to the evacuation of 2,800 people from the area. The evacuation was 16 hours after the leak was reported and lasted less than 4 hours, despite the ongoing fires and pollution reported by residents. Later, some residents reported breathing problems, migraines, eye and throat irritations. Louisiana office of homeland security declared "All clear" on day 1 of the fire per Marathon's briefing, but the fire continued to burn. 911 operators were not provided up to date information from the company, and the call center that Marathon set up were not shared widely to the public. Justince Lawrence, a human resources manager from Marathon, said "I am really not looking to open the floodgates".

The company, Marathon Petroleum Corporation, and local government officials have maintained to this day that no offsite impacts were detected during the four day burning of the refinery. This claim is heavily disputed by journalists at The Guardian and Forensic Architecture. For instance, Forensic Architecture's modeling put the benzene concentration exceeding the EPA's acute risk levels after residents were told to return home.

After the event, Marathon reported toxic emission 143 times over the state's daily limit, and also reported only one tank was compromised, a claim refuted by photo and video evidence.

== See also ==
- List of oil refineries
- Marathon Petroleum Company
- San Francisco Plantation
