= U.S. Oil and Refining =

Oil refinery in Tacoma, Washington

Coordinates: 47°15′31″N 122°23′43″W

U.S. Refining Co.
- Company type: Subsidiary
- Industry: Oil Refining
- Founded: 1952 as Pacific Oil & Refining Co. 1955 as U.S. Oil & Refining, Tacoma, Washington, United States
- Products: Petrochemical
- Number of employees: 160
- Website: www.usor.com

U.S. Oil & Refining Co. is an oil refinery located in the tideflats of Tacoma, Washington.

== History ==
USOR (U.S. Oil & Refining Co.) began in 1952 as Pacific Oil & Refining Co., a privately held corporation. Its first president was Dr. Ernest Lyder. The company was formed to build an oil refinery in the Pacific Northwest. In 1954, the refinery's present site in Tacoma was purchased, and in 1955 the corporation was renamed U.S. Oil & Refining Co.

Construction of the initial facility, a 5,000 barrels per day (790 m^{3}/d) (stream) refinery, began during the summer of 1955. Chico Marx entertained at the ground-breaking ceremony on July 22, 1955, for the new $10 million plant. Tacoma Mayor Harold Tollefson and senators Warren G. Magnuson and Henry M. Jackson also attended the ceremony. Construction was completed in mid-1957 and the refinery in full operation by the end of the year. The site had been a favorite spot for fishing, swimming, and duck hunting in earlier years. The west end of the site had once been the city landfill, which at one time contained (unmodified, unstripped) Japanese Zeros brought over from after World War II. The east end of the site was once wetlands.

A second crude unit, capable of processing heavy crude oil, used in the manufacture of paving grade asphalt, became operational in 1959. USOR was sold to Astra Oil Trading, a subsidiary of Transcor, in 2006. Astra sold USOR to TrailStone in 2014, which is funded by Riverstone Holdings, a private equity firm founded by key Goldman Sachs entrepreneurs.

== Products and facility ==
Partial view of USOR with Mount Rainier in background

The refinery, with current crude capacity of 39,000 barrels per day (6,200 m^{3}/d) is located on 136 acres (55 ha) in the deep-water Port of Tacoma, Washington. This includes 11.5 acres (4.7 ha) of waterfront with 1,350 feet (410 m) of waterfront on the Blair Waterway which provides direct access by ocean-going barges and tankers. Five pipelines, varying in size, connect the refinery and marine terminal. There is also a 14.5-mile (23.3 km) pipeline connecting the refinery to McChord Air Force Base, supplying jet fuel to the base. The refinery has direct rail access and is close to both a major interstate highway system and the Seattle-Tacoma International Airport.

The refinery's products include gasoline, diesel, marine and jet fuels, residual fuels, and asphalt. These products are made by use of a few different primary process units, including vacuum distillation, catalytic reforming, isomerization, and diesel hydrotreating.

USOR receives most of its crude oil by rail car, and some by vessel at its dock. The refinery has storage capacity for approximately one million barrels of crude oil and one million barrels of refined petroleum products. In 2007, storage was increased by 500,000 barrels (79,000 m^{3}) of crude oil and 250,000 barrels (40,000 m^{3}) of other products. Distribution facilities include truck and trailer, marine and rail loading for fuels and asphalt in Tacoma, and deliveries of jet fuel via pipeline.

== Notes and references ==
Notes

References

1. USOR company archives and External links below
2. Tacoma Public Library - Tacoma Past & Present
