= Frontier Oil =

- Company type: Public
- Traded as: NYSE: FTO
- Industry: Oil & Gas Refining & Marketing
- Founded: 1949 (as Wainoco Oil)
- Defunct: 2012
- Fate: merged with Holly Corporation to HollyFrontier Corporation
- Headquarters: Houston, Texas
- Key people: Mike Jennings, CEO & Chairman
- Products: Petrochemical
- Number of employees: 731
- Website: www.frontieroil.com

Frontier Oil was an energy company, originally based in Canada, that moved to the United States. Its headquarters were located in Houston, TX, and its subsidiary company, Frontier Refining & Marketing, Inc., is located in Denver, Colorado. Frontier's primary products were gasoline, diesel, and asphalt, and were marketed in the Rocky Mountain and Plains States.

Frontier Oil owned refineries in Cheyenne, Wyoming and El Dorado, Kansas. Its Cheyenne refinery has a capacity of 52,000 barrels per day (8,300 m^{3}/d) (bpd) and the El Dorado Refinery has a capacity of 110,000 bbl/d (17,000 m^{3}/d).

Frontier merged with Holly Corporation in 2011 to form HollyFrontier Corporation.

== History ==
The company was incorporated in Ontario in 1949 as Wainwright Refineries Limited, changing its names to Wainwright Producers & Refiners Limited in 1953, to Wainoco Oil and Chemicals Ltd. in 1966, and to Wainoco Oil Ltd. in 1971. In 1976 it became Wainoco Oil Corporation on its move to Wyoming in the United States. It changed its name to Frontier Oil in 1996.

On November 7, 2007, Frontier announced that the third quarter of 2007 had been the most profitable in the company's history. They reported a total income of US$137,200,000 for the quarter, and $432,700,000 for the year to that point.

Frontier merged with Holly Corporation effective as of July 1, 2011 to form HollyFrontier Corporation.

== See also ==
- List of oil refineries
