= Puget Sound Refinery =

Oil refinery in Washington state, US

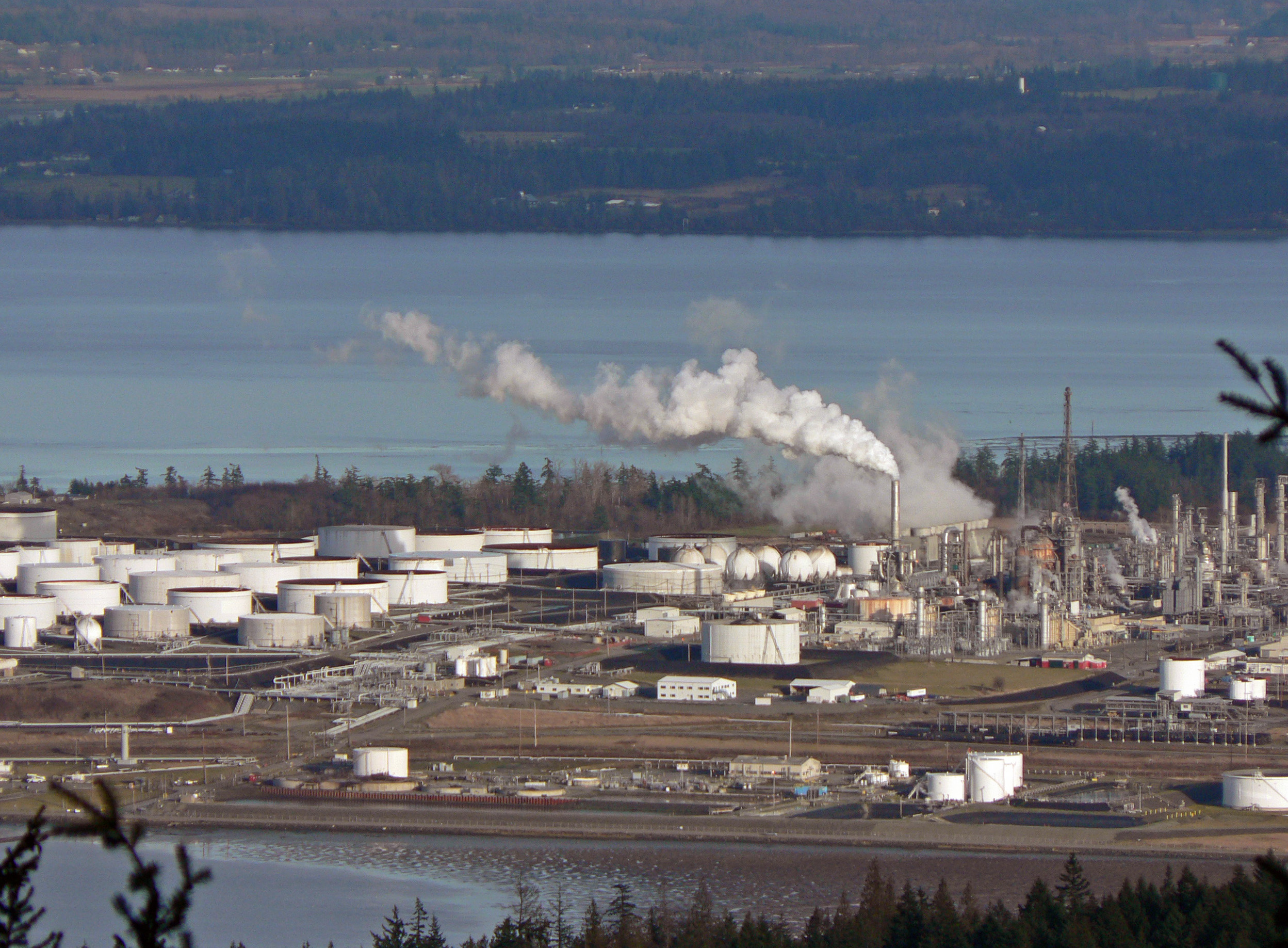
- Storage tanks and towers at Puget Sound Refinery, Anacortes, Washington

- Location within Washington (state) Location within the United States
- Location: Anacortes, Washington; 48°28′13″N 122°33′34″W

Refinery details
- Owners: HF Sinclair (2021–present); Shell (2001–2021); Equilon (1997-2001); Texaco (1957-1997)
- Opened: 1957
- Area: 850 acres (340 ha)
- Capacity: 160,000 barrels per day (25,000 m^{3}/d)
- No. of employees: 470
- Website: Puget Sound Refinery

The Puget Sound Refinery is an oil refinery on March Point near Anacortes, Washington, United States. It is operated by HF Sinclair and is one of the largest employers in Skagit County. The refinery has a capacity of 145,000 barrels a day, making it the 52nd largest in the United States, in 2015, with facilities that include a delayed coker, fluid catalytic cracker, polymerization unit and alkylation units. HF Sinclair’s refinery produces three grades of gasoline, fuel oil, diesel fuel, propane and butane. This plant is currently the only refinery in Washington state unable to accommodate tight oil via rail. The permitting process is currently underway for the proposed 60,000 b/d unloading capacity of the East Gate Rail Project.

== History ==
The refinery was built by Texaco in 1957. Its initial capacity of 45,000 barrels a day (bbl./d.) came online in 1958.

Before 1998 Shell Oil operated the neighboring Shell Anacortes Refinery (discussed below). Shell and Texaco combined their refining and marketing operations, assets valued at $17 billion, in 1997. The joint business was known as Equilon. Antitrust litigation accepted the deal under the condition that Shell sell its current refinery, located directly north of (adjacent to) the newly-acquired Equilon refinery. The jointly owned former Texaco refinery was renamed the Puget Sound Refinery. At the neighbor refinery, meanwhile, Tesoro, an independent Texas-based midstream and downstream company, won bidding for the old Shell Anacortes Refinery at $237 million, with an additional payment of $60 million for net working capital. Tesoro became Andeavor in 2017, and with Marathon Petroleum's purchase of Andeavor in 2018, the one-time Shell Anacortes Refinery became the Marathon Anacortes Refinery.

When Texaco merged with Chevron in 2001, Shell bought out Texaco's share of Equilon, making Shell the sole owner of both Equilon and the Puget Sound Refinery.

Shell sold the Puget Sound Refinery to the HollyFrontier in 2021 for $350 million. As of 2026 it has a maximum capacity of 160,000 barrels a day and serves customers in the Pacific Northwest, including British Columbia, as well as the major international air and sea ports in the region.
