= Garyville, Louisiana =

Garyville
- Census-designated place
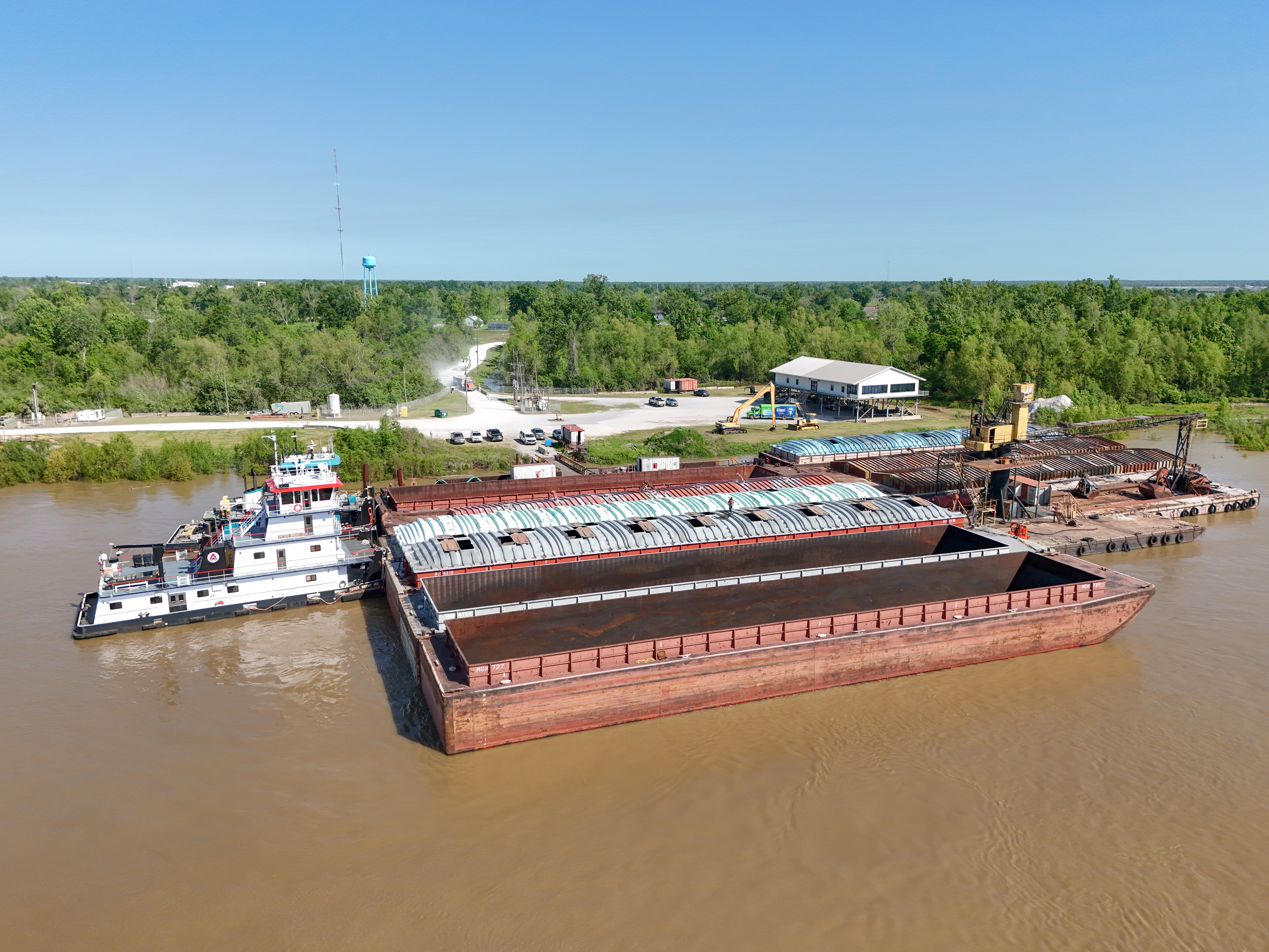
- Barge fleeting in Garyville

- Location of Garyville in Louisiana
- Coordinates: 30°03′26″N 90°37′07″W
- Country: United States
- State: Louisiana
- Parish: St. John the Baptist

Area
  - Total: 16.07 sq mi (41.61 km^{2})
  - Land: 14.29 sq mi (37.00 km^{2})
  - Water: 1.78 sq mi (4.61 km^{2})
- Elevation: 7 ft (2.1 m)

Population (2020)
  - Total: 2,123
  - Density: 148.6/sq mi (57.38/km^{2})
- Time zone: UTC-6 (CST)
  - Summer (DST): UTC-5 (CDT)
- Area code: 985
- FIPS code: 22-28345

Garyville is a census-designated place (CDP) in St. John the Baptist Parish, Louisiana, United States. The population was 2,775 at the 2000 census and 2,123 in 2020. It is part of the New Orleans–Metairie–Kenner metropolitan statistical area.

The Garyville Refinery, built in 1976 by Marathon Petroleum Company, is the third-largest oil refinery in the United States.

== Geography ==
Garyville is located at 30°3′26″N 90°37′7″W (30.057346, -90.618488).

According to the United States Census Bureau, the CDP has a total area of 22.4 square miles (58 km^{2}), of which 20.9 square miles (54 km^{2}) is land and 1.4 square miles (3.6 km^{2}) is water.

== Demographics ==
Historical population
Census	Pop.	Note	%±
1950	1,850		—
1960	2,839		53.5%
1970	2,474		−12.9%
1980	2,856		15.4%
1990	3,181		11.4%
2000	2,775		−12.8%
2010	2,811		1.3%
2020	2,123		−24.5%
U.S. Decennial Census; 1950 1960 1970 1980; 1990 2000 2010

Garyville first appeared as an unincorporated place in the 1950 U.S. census; and as a census designated place in the 1980 United States census.

Garyville CDP, Louisiana – Racial and ethnic composition Note: the US census treats Hispanic/Latino as an ethnic category. This table excludes Latinos from the racial categories and assigns them to a separate category. Hispanics/Latinos may be of any race.
Race / Ethnicity (NH = Non-Hispanic)	Pop 2000	Pop 2010	Pop 2020	% 2000	% 2010	% 2020
White alone (NH)	1,283	1,265	1,014	46.23%	45.00%	47.76%
Black or African American alone (NH)	1,444	1,502	989	52.04%	53.43%	46.59%
Native American or Alaska Native alone (NH)	4	3	3	0.14%	0.11%	0.14%
Asian alone (NH)	4	0	0	0.14%	0.00%	0.00%
Native Hawaiian or Pacific Islander alone (NH)	1	0	0	0.04%	0.00%	0.00%
Other race alone (NH)	0	1	1	0.00%	0.04%	0.05%
Mixed race or Multiracial (NH)	19	14	69	0.68%	0.50%	3.25%
Hispanic or Latino (any race)	20	26	47	0.72%	0.92%	2.21%
Total	2,775	2,811	2,123	100.00%	100.00%	100.00%

As of the 2020 United States census, there were 2,123 people, 822 households, and 504 families residing in the CDP. As of the census of 2000, there were 2,775 people, 913 households, and 717 families residing in the CDP. The population density was 132.6 inhabitants per square mile (51.2/km^{2}). There were 984 housing units at an average density of 47.0 units per square mile (18.1 units/km^{2}). The racial makeup of the CDP was 46.49% White, 52.43% African American, 0.14% Native American, 0.14% Asian, 0.07% Pacific Islander, 0.04% from other races, and 0.68% from two or more races. Hispanic or Latino of any race were 0.72% of the population.

There were 913 households, out of which 36.7% had children under the age of 18 living with them, 48.0% were married couples living together, 24.9% had a female householder with no husband present, and 21.4% were non-families. 17.9% of all households were made up of individuals, and 8.4% had someone living alone who was 65 years of age or older. The average household size was 3.03 and the average family size was 3.48.

In the CDP, the population was spread out, with 30.8% under the age of 18, 10.1% from 18 to 24, 26.8% from 25 to 44, 21.0% from 45 to 64, and 11.3% who were 65 years of age or older. The median age was 33 years. For every 100 females, there were 88.9 males. For every 100 females age 18 and over, there were 86.1 males.

The median income for a household in the CDP was $29,375, and the median income for a family was $34,155. Males had a median income of $34,639 versus $21,154 for females. The per capita income for the CDP was $11,998. About 24.1% of families and 28.0% of the population were below the poverty line, including 38.3% of those under the age of 18 and 30.2% of those 65 and older.

== Attempt at incorporation ==
A referendum on the incorporation of Garyville was held on July 19, 2008, but failed to pass. The proposed city limits of Garyville would have contained several petrochemical industrial sites, providing the bulk of the new city's tax revenue. Louisiana Supreme Court-appointed ad hoc judge Anne Lennan Simon ruled on July 15, 2008, that the areas zoned as designated industrial areas included the facilities of Marathon Petroleum Company, Nalco Co., Gramercy Alumina LLC, Cargill Inc., and Evonik-Stockhausen Inc., thus reducing the city's proposed income from "about $144 million to about $28 million".

== Education ==
St. John the Baptist Parish School Board, which includes the entire parish, operates public schools in the community.

Areas in Garyville are zoned to:

- Garyville-Mt. Airy Math and Science Magnet School
- East St. John High School
