= Tesoro Corporation =

American energy company

Tesoro
- Industry: Oil and gas
- Predecessor: Western Refining
- Founded: 1968; 58 years ago
- Founder: Robert V. West Jr.
- Defunct: October 1, 2018
- Fate: Acquired by Marathon Petroleum
- Successor: Marathon Petroleum
- Headquarters: San Antonio, Texas, United States
- Number of locations: 10 oil refineries, 3,000 branded retail gas stations
- Area served: Central, Western U.S., Western México
- Products: Petroleum products, natural gas and fuel
- Revenue: ▲US$34.975 billion (2017)
- Operating income: ▲US$1.525 billion (2017)
- Net income: ▲US$1.528 billion (2017)
- Total assets: ▲US$28.573 billion (2017)
- Total equity: ▲US$9.815 billion (2017)
- Number of employees: 14,300 (2017)

Tesoro Corporation, known briefly as Andeavor, was a Fortune 100 and a Fortune Global 500 company headquartered in San Antonio, Texas, with 2017 annual revenues of $35 billion, and over 14,000 employees worldwide. Based on 2017 revenue, the company ranked No. 90 in the 2018 Fortune 500 list of the largest United States corporations by total revenue.

Tesoro was an independent refiner and marketer of petroleum products, operating ten refineries in the Western United States with a combined rated crude oil capacity of approximately 1,200,000 barrels (190,000 m^{3}) per day. Tesoro's retail-marketing system included approx. 3,000 branded retail gas stations, of which more than 595 were company-operated under its own Tesoro brandname, as well as Shell, ExxonMobil, ARCO, and USA Gasoline brands.

Tesoro, known at the time as Andeavor, was acquired by Marathon Petroleum on October 1, 2018.

== History ==
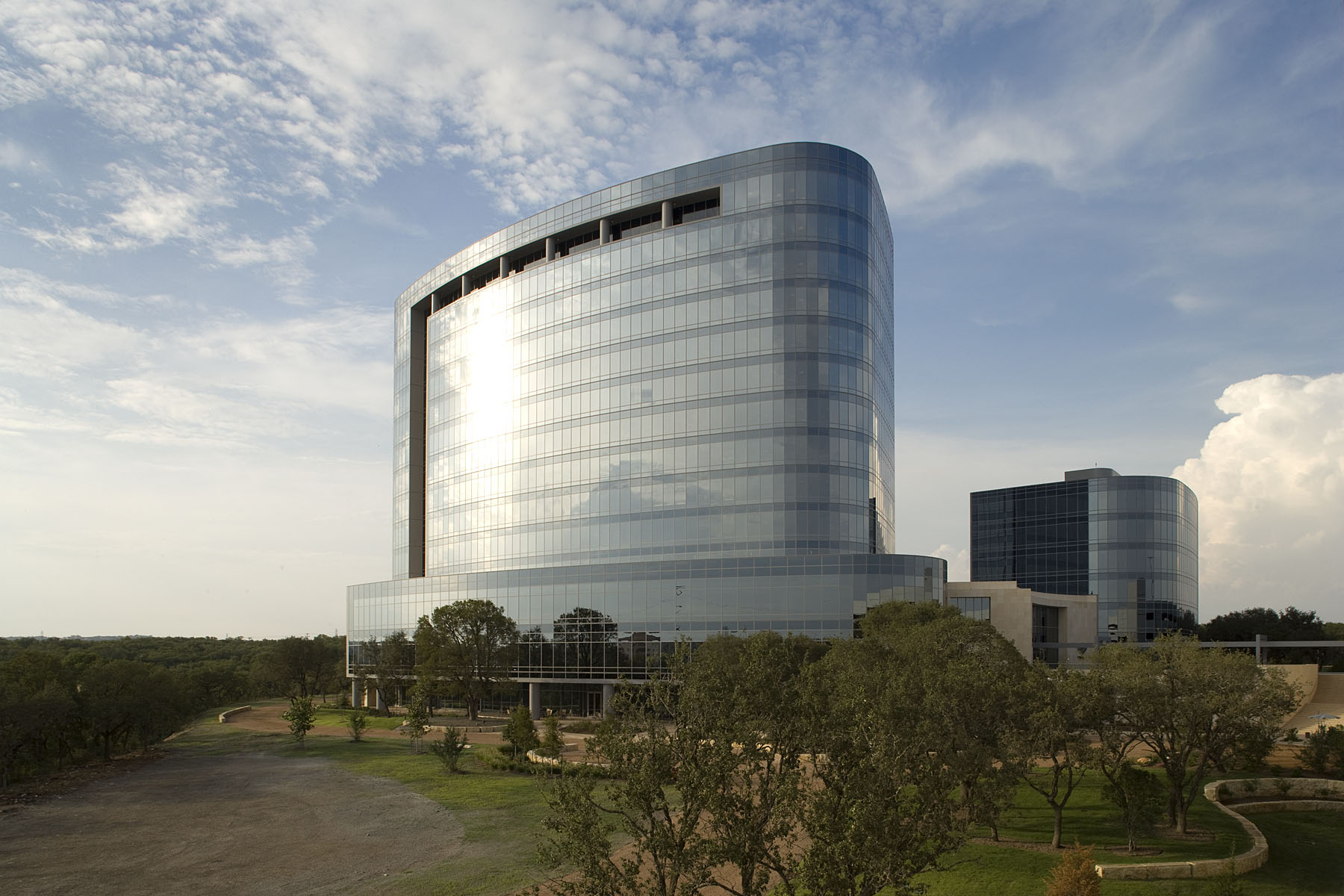
Tesoro's corporate headquarters, completed in 2009, at San Antonio, Texas

Tesoro was founded in 1968 by Dr. Robert Van Osdell West Jr (1921–2006), and was primarily engaged in petroleum exploration and production. Tesoro began operating its first refinery, near Kenai, Alaska, in 1969. Tesoro became the first Fortune 500 company to be headquartered in San Antonio, Texas. Tesoro is the word for treasure (or treasury) in Italian and Spanish.

Beginning in the late 1990s, Tesoro grew through a series of acquisitions and initiatives that created Tesoro Corporation, the company focusing on the core business of petroleum refining, marketing, maritime transportation and distribution. The first segment involved the operation of six petroleum refineries situated in California, Alaska, Washington, Hawaii, North Dakota, and Utah. For its marketing and distribution segment, Tesoro sold refined gas and fuel products in both bulk and wholesale markets. Acquisitions expanded refining capacity from 72,000 barrels per day (11,400 m^{3}/d) to approximately 664,000 barrels per day (105,600 m^{3}/d).

Prior to its acquisition by Marathon Petroleum in 2018, Tesoro was the third-largest independent petroleum refining and marketing company in the United States. The merger between the two companies formed the largest American refiner by capacity and the fifth in the world.

Milestones in Tesoro's history are:

- 1998: acquires second refinery (after Nikiski) in Kapolei, Hawaii along with petroleum terminals and approximately 30 retail stations in Hawaii from BHP Americas — also acquires the former Shell refinery at Anacortes, Washington;
- 1999: sells exploration and production operations;
- 2001: purchases refineries in Mandan, North Dakota, and Salt Lake City, Utah from BP Amoco;
- 2002: acquires Golden Eagle Refinery in Martinez, California from Ultramar (Valero);
- 2003: sells Tesoro Marine Services to Martin Midstream: Tesoro Marine Services were operating fueling and supply terminals servicing US Gulf Coast oil and gas exploration — also made a series of refinery acquisitions that boosted the company's capacity output and positioned it for future expansion in key growth markets throughout the Western United States;
- 2005: largest capital expansion program in Tesoro Corporation's history and record earnings;
- 2007: announcement of purchase of Shell's refinery at Los Angeles refinery and approximately 250 Southern California retail stations;
- 2007: Tesoro acquires USA Gasoline;
- 2009: Tesoro employees move into a newly completed corporate campus in July;
- 2011: Tesoro forms Tesoro Logistics LP (TLLP) as a master limited partnership;
- 2011: Tesoro acquires 250 ARCO (Thrifty Style Stations) and Thrifty Stations in Southern California;
- 2012: Tesoro changes the 250 ARCO (Thrifty Style Stations) and Thrifty Stations in Southern California to USA Gasoline;
- 2013: Tesoro purchases the Carson refinery and the ARCO brand from BP;
- 2013: Tesoro sells its Kapolei refinery to Par Petroleum (now Par Pacific Holdings);
- 2016: Tesoro purchases Dakota Prairie Refining in Dickinson, North Dakota from WBI Energy; construction of the refinery was completed in the spring of 2015;
- 2016: Tesoro Corp agrees to buy Western Refining for $4.1 billion;
- 2016/17: Par Pacific Inc. rebrands its Tesoro and 76 gas stations as HELE;
- Corporate logo from 2017 to 2018
  2017: Tesoro announces its change of name to Andeavor following its acquisition of Western Refining; On August 1, 2017, the company changed its ticker symbol to "ANDV" from "TSO";
- 2018: Andeavor announced its entering into a definitive merger agreement with Marathon Petroleum with Marathon Petroleum acquiring all of Andeavor's outstanding shares for US$23 billion (equivalent to $28.2 billion in 2024); the merger was closed on October 1.

== Media controversy ==
=== Environmental record ===
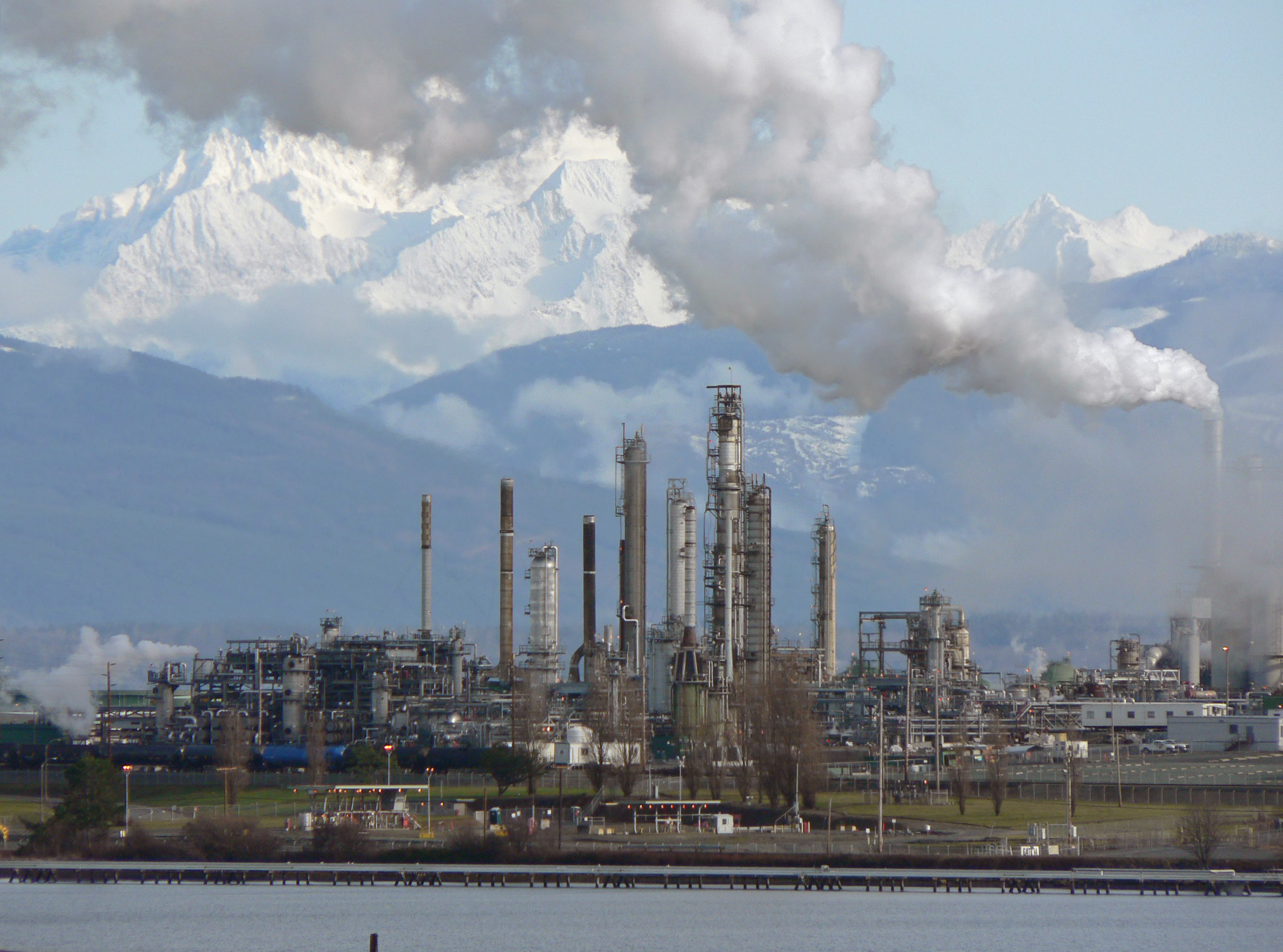
Tesoro's Anacortes Refinery at March Point in Puget Sound, southeast of Anacortes, Washington State

Having taken over BP installations, researchers at the Political Economy Research Institute identified Tesoro as being the 24th-largest corporate producer of air pollution in the United States, releasing roughly 3,740,000 lb (1,700 t) of toxic chemicals annually. Major pollutants emitted annually by the corporation were estimated to include more than 400,000 lb (180 t) of sulfuric acid, following which the Environmental Protection Agency named Tesoro a potentially responsible party for at least four superfund toxic waste sites. Tesoro settled and/or closed each of the superfund sites where it was named as one of many responsible parties. Tesoro was listed as a de minimis contributor to a superfund site in Abbeville, LA, and the site has since been closed by the EPA.

Tesoro gave over $1 million in support of California Proposition 23, which aimed to suspend the Global Warming Solutions Act of 2006.

Defenders of the Amazon forest in South America cite Tesoro for sourcing some of their crude oil from the Amazon. Three of Tesoro's refineries - Anacortes (WA), LA (CA) and Golden Eagle (CA), were known to process Amazonian crude oil.

=== Explosion ===
On April 2, 2010, an explosion at Tesoro's refinery in Anacortes, Washington, killed seven workers.

=== Hawaii refinery ===
Tesoro bought Libyan crude oil, after the overthrow of Colonel Gaddafi, in early April 2011 from the Vitol Group to supply its then-Hawaiian refinery.

== See also ==
- List of automotive fuel brands
- List of oil exploration and production companies
- Marathon Petroleum
