= Marathon Anacortes Refinery =

Petroleum refinery in Washington, United States

Anacortes Refinery
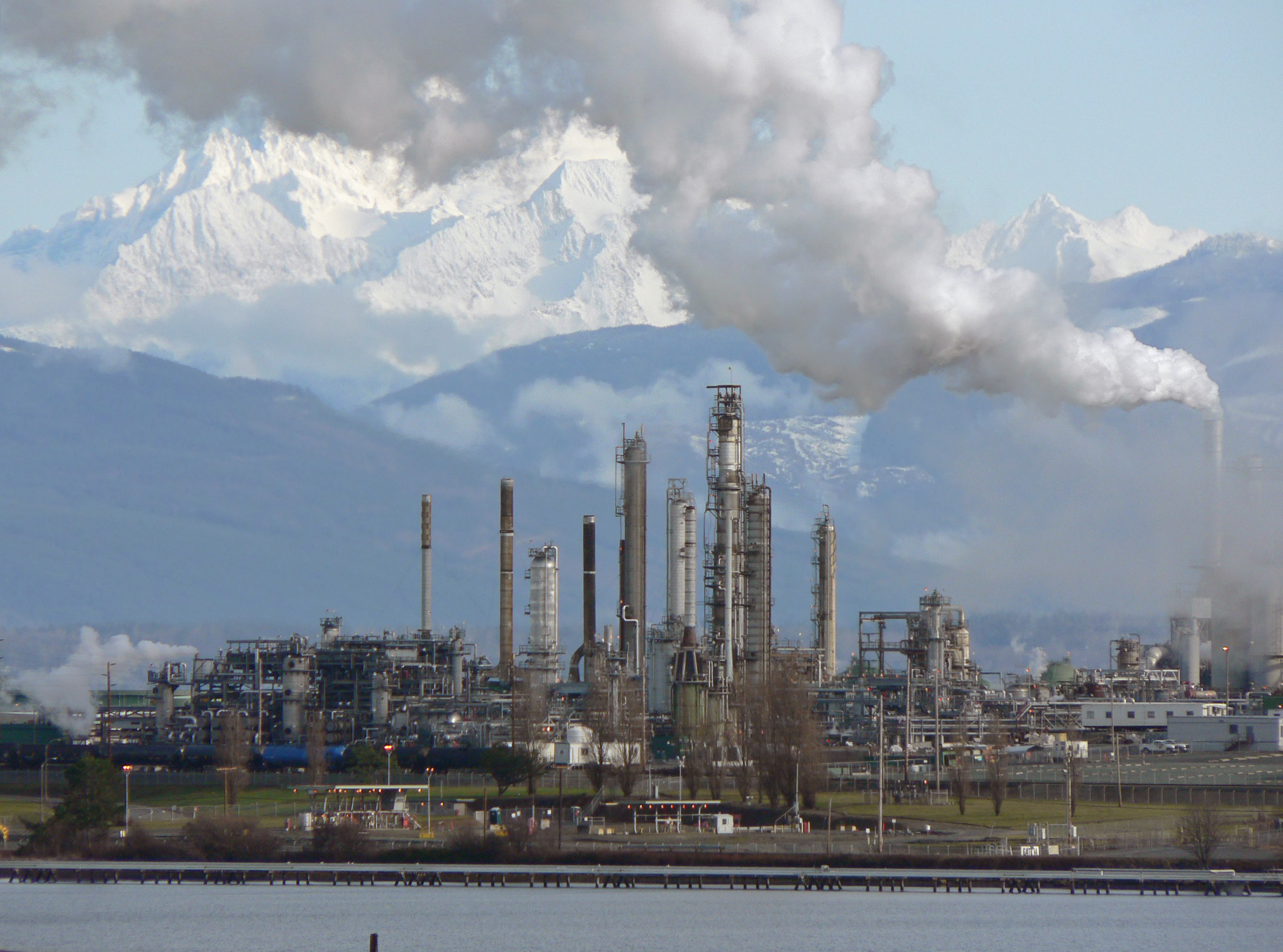
- The Marathon Anacortes Refinery

- Location within Washington (state)
- Location: Anacortes, Washington, United States; 48°29′48″N 122°34′1″W

Refinery details
- Operator: Marathon Petroleum
- Opened: 1955
- Capacity: 120,000 barrels per day (19,000 m^{3}/d)
- No. of employees: 425

The Anacortes Refinery is a petroleum refinery located about 70 miles north of Seattle on March Point (Puget Sound), just outside Anacortes, Washington, United States. The refinery has operated in Anacortes since 1955, and has 425 full-time employees. It has a 120,000 barrels per day (bpd) capacity and is operated by Marathon Petroleum.

== Production ==
The refinery receives crude feedstock via the Trans Mountain pipeline from Canada, by rail from North Dakota and the central U.S., and by tanker from Alaska and foreign sources. Gasoline, jet and diesel fuel are the primary products, which are supplied to end users predominantly in Washington, Oregon and British Columbia. Other products include heavy fuel oils, liquefied petroleum gas, and asphalt. Secondary processing facilities include a fluid catalytic cracker, an alkylation unit, hydrotreating units and a naphtha reformer. Finished products are shipped through a third-party pipeline system that serves western Washington and Oregon.

== Explosion ==
On April 2, 2010, an explosion at the Anacortes refinery killed seven workers when a heat exchanger failed during startup after a maintenance operation.

== See also ==
- Puget Sound Refinery
