= Marathon Petroleum =

American petroleum refining, marketing, and transportation company

Marathon Petroleum Corporation

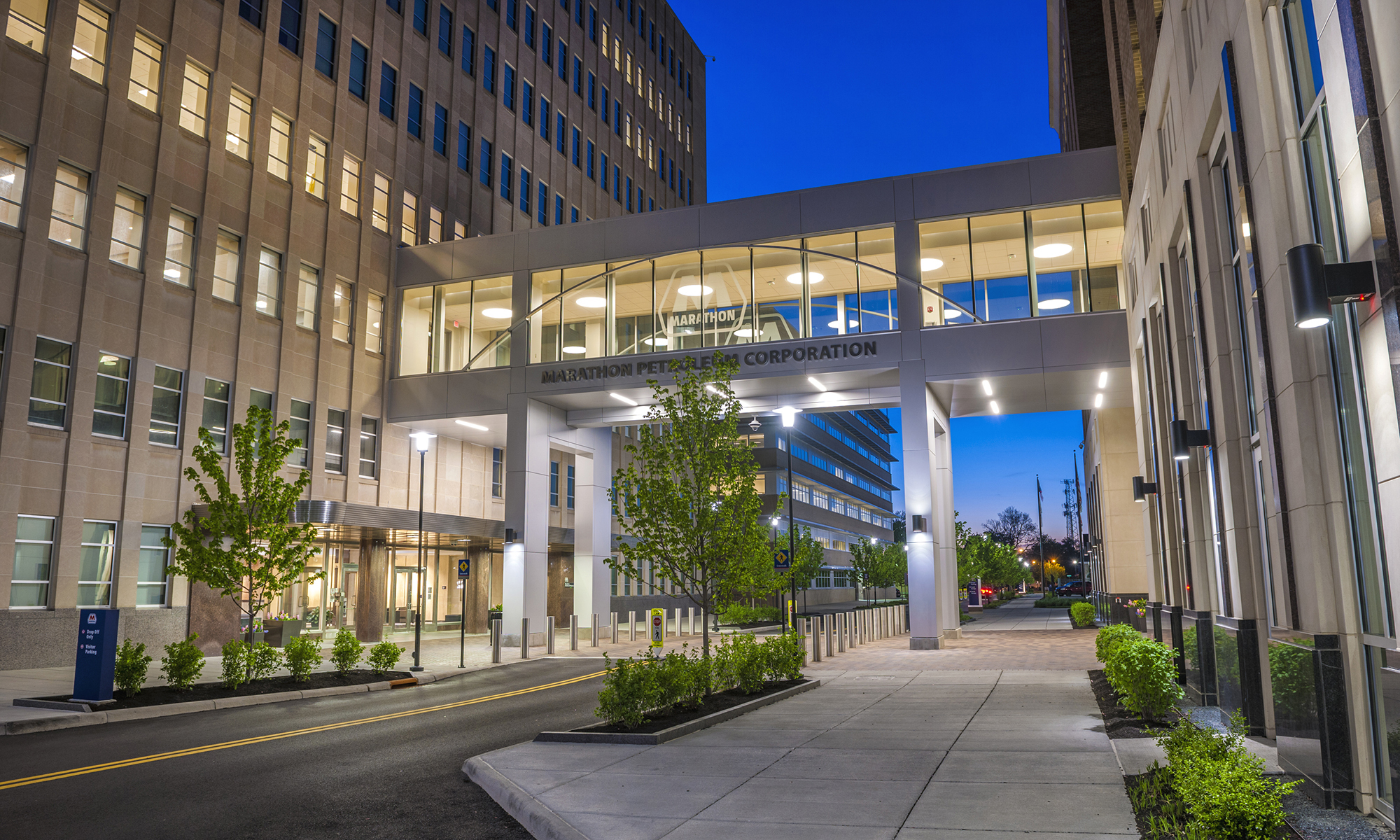
- Headquarters in Findlay, Ohio
- Type: Public
- Traded as: NYSE: MPC; S&P 500 component
- Industry: Petroleum
- Predecessors: Marathon Oil (1984); Ashland Global; USX Corporation
- Founded: November 9, 2009; 17 years ago
- Headquarters: Findlay, Ohio, U.S.
- Number of locations: 7,220 independently owned retail outlets; 1,100 direct dealer locations
- Area served: Worldwide
- Key people: Michael J. Hennigan (Chairman); Maryann Mannen (President & CEO); John P. Surma (Lead Independent Director)
- Products: Fuel; Diesel fuel; Diesel Exhaust Fluid; Jet fuel; Petrochemicals; Lubricants; Renewable Fuels; Crude Oil; Natural gas
- Production output: Total rated crude oil refining capacity: 2,963,000 BPCD (2024)
- Services: Pipeline transport; Oil refining; Marketing
- Revenue: ▼US$140.4 billion (2024)
- Operating income: ▼US$5.428 billion (2024)
- Net income: ▼US$3.445 billion (2024)
- Total assets: ▼US$78.86 billion (2024)
- Total equity: ▼US$17.75 billion (2024)
- Number of employees: 18,300 (2024)
- Parent: Marathon Oil (2009–11)
- Website: www.marathonpetroleum.com

Marathon Petroleum Corporation is an American petroleum refining, marketing, and transportation company headquartered in Findlay, Ohio. The company was a wholly owned subsidiary of Marathon Oil until a corporate spin-off in 2011.

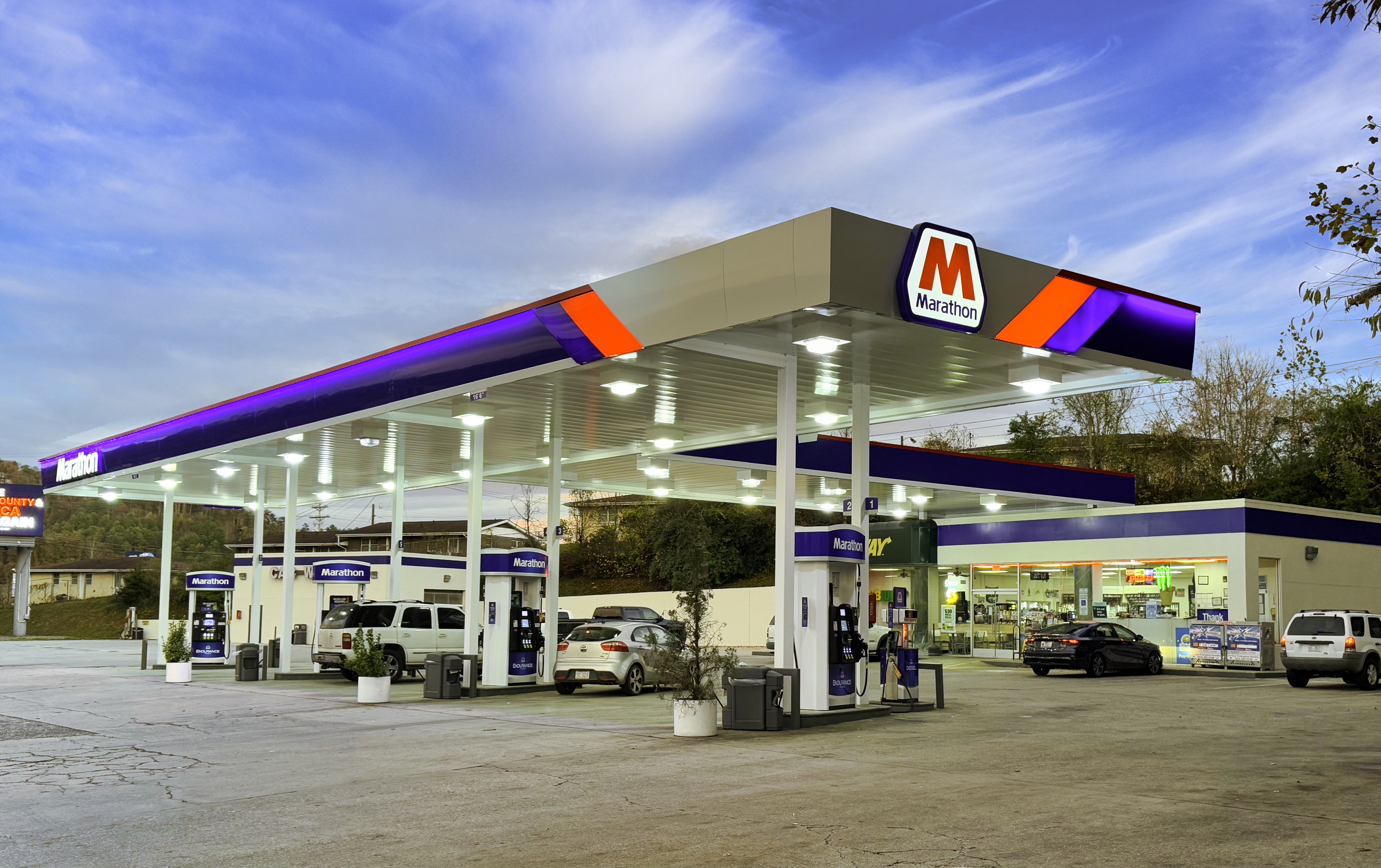
A Marathon fuel station in Murphy, North Carolina

Marathon Petroleum traces its origin from a number of small oil companies in Ohio that banded together in 1887. These formed The Ohio Oil Company established in Lima, Ohio. It became the largest oil producer in the state. By 1889, the company was acquired by the Standard Oil Trust and six years later its headquarters was moved to Findlay. In 1906, the company built its first oil pipeline, which connected its facilities in Martinsville, Illinois, and Preble, Indiana.

After the United States Supreme Court ordered its parent company to break up as a result of the Sherman Anti-Trust Act in 1911, Ohio Oil again became independent. It expanded its operations by purchasing oil fields outside of Ohio. The company also started oil refining. In 1924, the company discovered oil in Texas. In the same year, it acquired Lincoln Oil Refining Company. This purchase included a refinery and 17 brand service stations in Indiana. Several years later, Ohio Oil acquired Transcontinental Oil, which included – in addition to refineries, storage facilities, and filling stations – the Marathon product name.

Following its acquisition of Andeavor on October 1, 2018, Marathon Petroleum became the largest petroleum refinery operator in the United States, with 13 refineries and over 3 million barrels per calendar day of refining capacity. Marathon Petroleum ranked No. 41 on the 2018 Fortune 500 list of the largest United States corporations by total revenue. In the 2020 Forbes Global 2000, Marathon Petroleum was ranked as the 138th-largest public company in the world.

Marathon Petroleum's marketing system includes branded locations across the United States, including Marathon and ARCO branded fuel stations. MPC also owns the general partner and majority limited partner interest in MPLX LP, a midstream company which owns and operates gathering, processing, and fractionation assets, as well as crude oil and light product transportation and logistics infrastructure.

== History ==
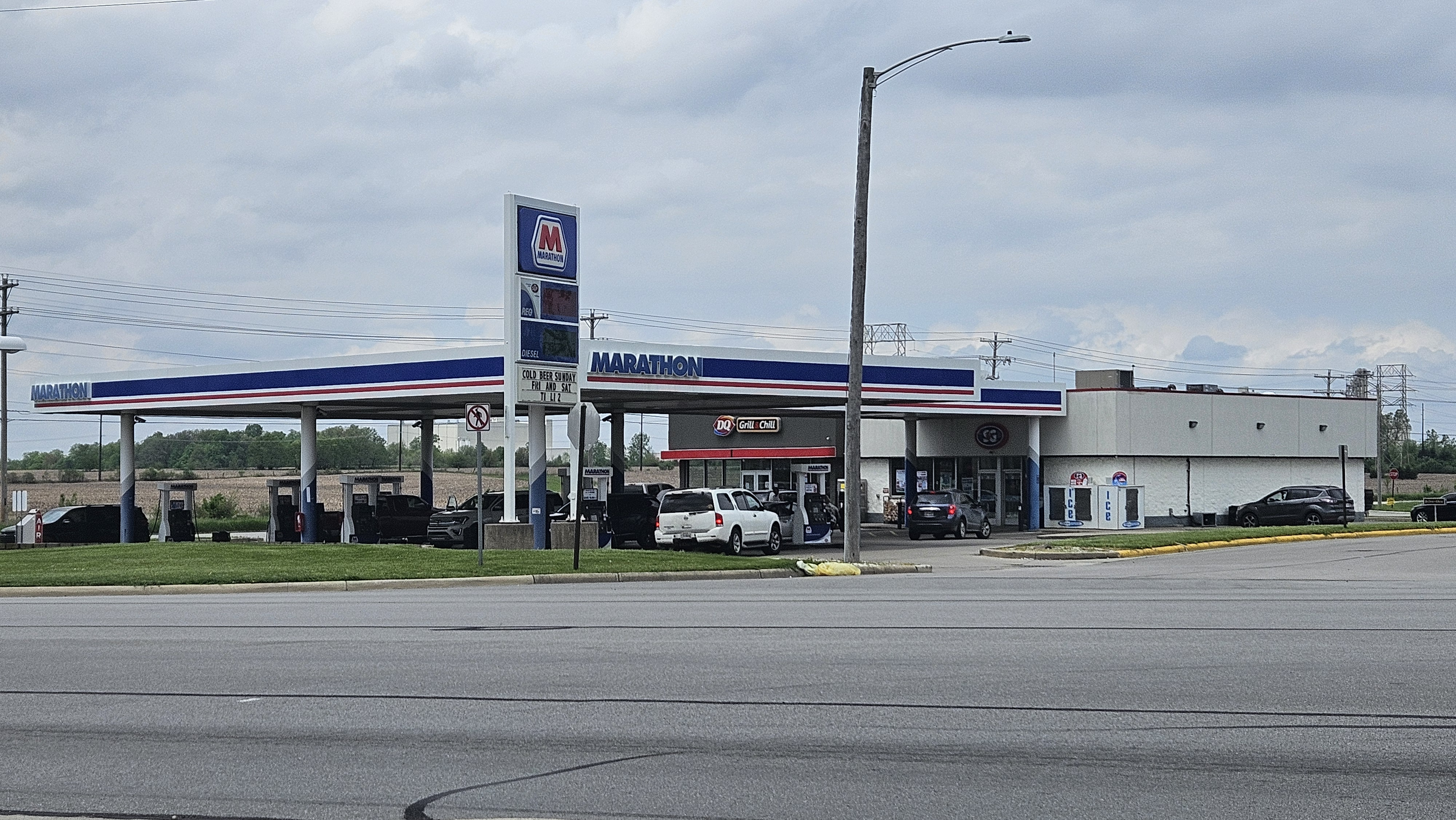
Marathon station in Sidney, Ohio

Marathon Petroleum Corporation was formed on November 9, 2009, as a subsidiary of Marathon Oil.

=== Predecessor company ===
The predecessor company of Marathon Petroleum Corporation, Marathon Petroleum Company LLC, formerly known as Marathon Ashland Petroleum LLC, was formed by the merger of the refining operations of Marathon Oil and Ashland Inc. in 1998. The merger brought together several descendants of the Standard Oil trust, as Ashland had acquired several smaller Standard spinoffs while Marathon itself was directly owned by Standard Oil. It also brought Marathon's Speedway and Ashland's SuperAmerica convenience store chains together and were subsequently merged as "Speedway SuperAmerica".

As longtime Marathon rivals Standard Oil of Ohio and Amoco were acquired by British company BP, Marathon Ashland adopted the marketing slogan "An American Company Serving America", with the slogan being adjourned to Marathon fuel pumps. In 2006, it adopted its current slogan, "Fueling the American Spirit" as the company shifts emphasis on work ethic and the contributions of its employees.

In 2005, Ashland sold its share of Marathon Ashland to Marathon and the company became Marathon Petroleum. The company became a 100% owned subsidiary of Marathon Oil, after Ashland sold off its downstream assets and exited the retail business. In 2006, Marathon began using STP-branded additives in its fuel.

In 2009, the company completed a $3.9 billion expansion of its refinery in Garyville, Louisiana, that increased the plant's capacity by 180,000 barrels per day.

In 2010, the company sold its 74,000 barrel-per-day refinery in St. Paul Park, Minnesota, along with associated terminals, pipelines, and inventory as well as 166 SuperAmerica convenience stores to Northern Tier Energy for $900 million.

=== Post-corporate spin-off from Marathon Oil ===
On June 30, 2011, Marathon Oil distributed all of its shares in the company to its shareholders via a corporate spin-off.

In June 2012, Wheeling, West Virginia-based Tri-State Petroleum signed a contract to switch 50 stations in Ohio, Pennsylvania, and West Virginia to the Marathon brand. Most of Tri-State's stations before the deal were ExxonMobil-branded fuel stations, the majority Exxon as well as a few scattered Mobil stations in the immediate Wheeling area. Included in the deal were 18 Exxon stations in the Pittsburgh metropolitan area, significantly boosting Marathon's presence in the Pittsburgh market, where former parent company U.S. Steel is based. (Exxon would offset its Pittsburgh losses by taking over the retail contracts of several Shell stations in the area, leaving Shell with a significantly reduced presence, while the Mobil brand was withdrawn from the Northern Panhandle of West Virginia altogether.) Before the deal, Marathon had a much smaller presence in Western Pennsylvania, while having a somewhat larger presence in West Virginia and an almost ubiquitous presence in Southern Ohio.

In 2013, Marathon purchased numerous assets from BP including a 451,000 barrel per calendar day refinery in Texas City, Texas, four light product distribution terminals, and retail marketing contracts for 1,200 retail stations throughout the southeastern United States.

In 2014, Speedway LLC, a now-former subsidiary of the company, purchased the retail operations of Hess Corporation for $2.82 billion. The deal also introduced the Marathon brand name at stations for the first time in the Northeastern United States east of the Appalachian Mountains and north of Pennsylvania. Prior to the deal, Marathon's traditional marketing territory for decades had been the Midwestern and Southeastern United States, never going further east than the Pittsburgh metropolitan area.

=== Refinery fires ===
==== Galveston Bay, Texas ====
In 2016, a fire at the Galveston Bay refinery in Texas City, Texas, injured three contract workers, resulting in a lawsuit seeking $1 million in damages. Multiple lawsuits were filed resulting in Marathon paying $86 million to settle.

==== Garyville, Louisiana ====
On August 25, 2023, a fire at the Garyville refinery, in Garyville, Louisiana, started at 8:04 am local time. After some time, residents and some local schools were evacuated due to the poorer air quality as precaution, but the response was not immediate.

=== 2018 acquisition of Andeavor, sale of Speedway LLC ===
On April 30, 2018, Marathon agreed to buy Andeavor, an independent refinery and oil company based in the Western United States, for $23 billion. Marathon will acquire all of Andeavor's outstanding shares. On October 1, 2018, the merger was completed. This merger brings the SuperAmerica convenience stores back to Speedway. On October 31, 2019, Marathon announced plans to spin off their Speedway convenience stores. Gary Heminger will also retire from his role as Marathon Chairman and CEO. The deal also had the effect of introducing the Marathon brand name at fuel stations in the Western United States for the first time and making Marathon a national brand name for the first time, as well as giving Marathon ownership of the ARCO brand.

On August 2, 2020, Marathon announced that Seven & i Holdings Co., Ltd. would be acquiring Speedway for $21 billion. The deal was anticipated to close in early 2021 pending regulatory approval. The deal closed on May 14, 2021.

== Operations ==
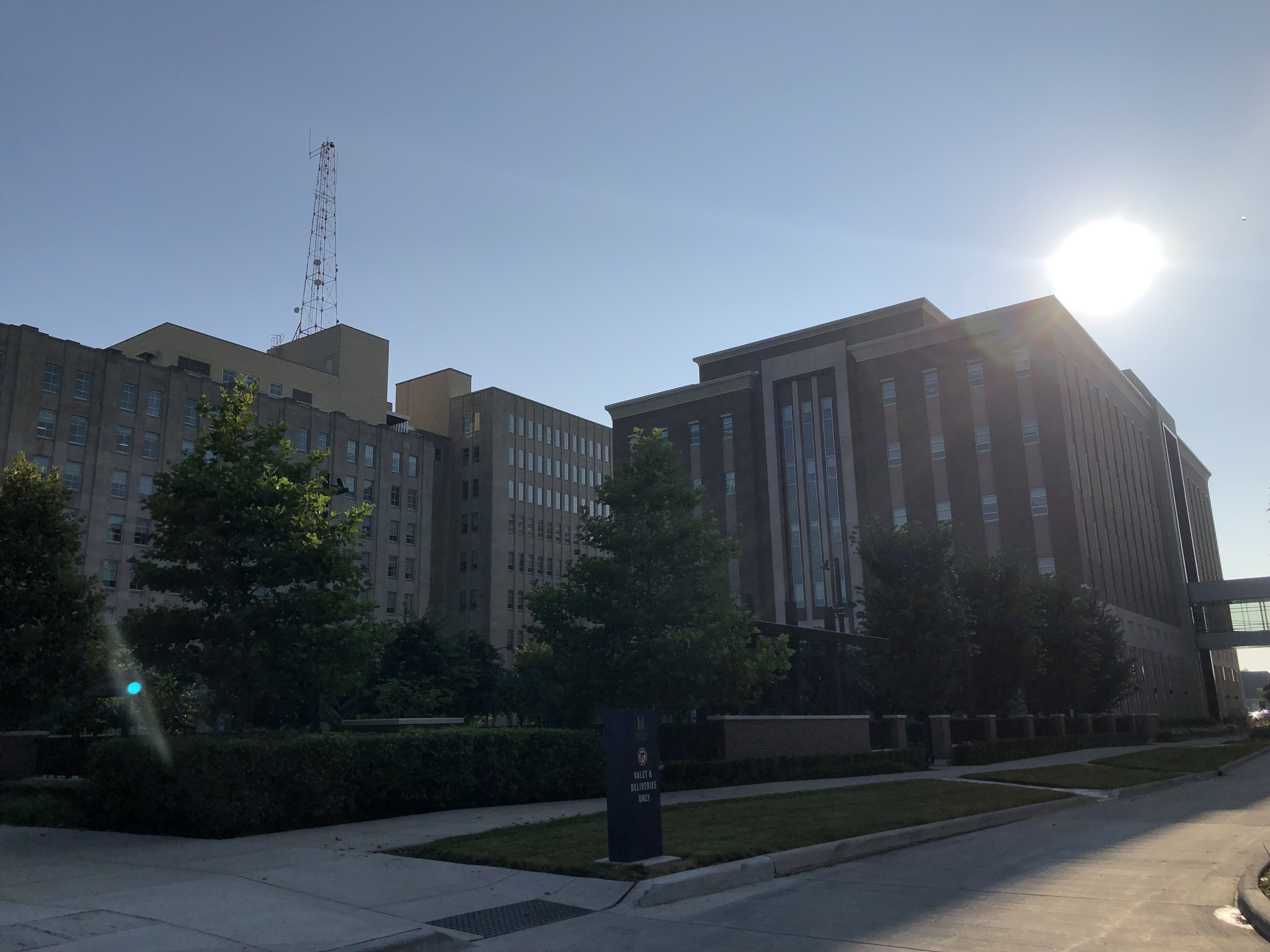
The Marathon Petroleum campus

Marathon owns:

- 13 refineries with a total crude oil throughput of 2,986,000 barrels per calendar day (bpcd)
- 9 Renewable Fuels and Feed Facilities producing 485 million gallons per year
- 2 Renewable Fuel Pretreatment Facilities and a Soy Processing Facility

#	Name	Location	Throughput
1	Anacortes Refinery	Anacortes, Washington	119,000 barrels per calendar day (bpcd)
2	Canton Refinery	Canton, Ohio	100,000 barrels per calendar day (bpcd)
3	Catlettsburg Refinery	Catlettsburg, Kentucky	307,000 barrels per calendar day (bpcd)
4	Detroit Refinery	Detroit, Michigan	146,000 barrels per calendar day (bpcd)
5	El Paso Refinery	El Paso, Texas	133,000 barrels per calendar day (bpcd)
6	Galveston Bay Refinery	Texas City, Texas	631,000 barrels per calendar day (bpcd)
7	Garyville Refinery	Garyville, Louisiana	617,000 barrels per calendar day (bpcd)
8	Kenai Refinery	Kenai, Alaska	68,000 barrels per calendar day (bpcd)
9	Los Angeles Refinery	Carson, California	365,000 barrels per calendar day (bpcd)
10	Mandan Refinery	Mandan, North Dakota	72,000 barrels per calendar day (bpcd)
11	Robinson Refinery	Robinson, Illinois	253,000 barrels per calendar day (bpcd)
12	Salt Lake City Refinery	Salt Lake City, Utah	70,000 barrels per calendar day (bpcd)
13	St. Paul Refinery	St. Paul Park, Minnesota	105,000 barrels per calendar day (bpcd)

- Leasehold or ownership interests in approximately 8,400 miles (13,500 km) of petroleum pipelines and 5,000 miles (8,050 km) of natural gas and natural gas liquids pipelines as well as related transportation and distribution assets such as railcars, barges, and processing terminals.
- A 20.4% interest, including a controlling 2% general partner interest, in MPLX, a public master limited partnership that owns pipelines and other midstream assets related to the transportation and storage of crude oil. NYSE: MPLX

=== Former ===
- The Speedway LLC retail chain included approximately 4,000 retail outlets, and was the second largest chain of company-owned and operated retail fuel and convenience stores in the United States. Seven & i Holdings Co., Ltd., parent company of 7-Eleven, acquired the chain in 2020 and the sale was completed on May 14, 2021.
- Marathon closed the 26,000 bpcd Gallup Refinery in 2020.
- In 2021 Marathon completed the conversion of the Dickinson Refinery to a renewable diesel (Biodiesel) facility with a capacity of 184 million gallons per year (~12,000 bpcd).
- In 2023 Marathon completed the conversion of the Martinez Refinery to a renewable fuels manufacturing facility with a capacity of 730 million gallons per year (47,500 bpcd).

== Finances ==
Financial data in $ millions
Year	2010	2011	2012	2013	2014	2015	2016	2017	2018	2019	2020	2021	2022
Revenue	62,487	78,638	82,243	100,160	97,817	72,051	63,339	74,733	86,086	111,148	69,779	119,983	177,453
Net Income	622	2,385	3,383	2,108	2,524	2,852	1,174	3,432	2,780	2,637	−9,826	9,738	14,516
Assets	23,232	25,745	27,223	28,385	30,425	43,115	44,413	49,047	92,940	98,556	85,158	85,373	89,904
Employees			25,985	29,865	45,340	45,440	44,460	43,800	60,350	60,910			

== See also ==
- Marathon Center for Performing Arts
- Petroleum refining in the United States
- Tesoro Corporation
