= HF Sinclair =

American energy company

HF Sinclair Corporation
- Formerly: General Appliance Corporation (1947–1952); Holly Corporation (1952–2011); HollyFrontier Corporation (2011–2022)
- Type: Public company
- Traded as: NYSE: DINO; S&P 400 component
- Industry: Petroleum industry
- Founded: 1947; 79 years ago
- Headquarters: Dallas, Texas, United States
- Key people: Franklin Myers, Chairman Tim Go, CEO
- Products: Gasoline; Diesel fuel Jet fuel Lubricants; Asphalt
- Revenue: ▼$26.869 billion (2025)
- Operating income: ▲$927 million (2025)
- Net income: ▲$586 million (2025)
- Total assets: ▼$16.510 billion (2025)
- Total equity: ▼$9.249 billion (2025)
- Number of employees: 5,165 (2025)
- Website: hfsinclair.com

HF Sinclair Corporation (HF Sinclair) is an American energy company that manufactures and sells products such as gasoline, diesel fuel, jet fuel, renewable diesel, specialty lubricant products, specialty chemicals, and specialty and modified asphalt, among others. It is based in Dallas, Texas, United States.

The company operates seven complex oil refineries with a total crude oil processing capacity of 678,000 barrels per stream day. It has refining facilities in El Dorado, Kansas (coking refinery - 135,000 bbl/d), Artesia, New Mexico (100,000 bbl/d), Tulsa, Oklahoma (125,000 bbl/d), Woods Cross, Utah (45,000 bbl/d), Sinclair, Wyoming (94,000 bbl/d), Anacortes, Washington (149,000 bbl/d), and Casper, Wyoming (30,000 bbl/d). The company operates three renewable diesel facilities in Sinclair, Wyoming (10,000 bbl/d), Artesia, New Mexico (9,000 bbl/d), Cheyenne, Wyoming (6,000 bbl/d) and three lubricants and specialties facilities in Mississauga (15,600 bbl/d), Petrolia, Pennsylvania and in the Netherlands. The company also operates asphalt terminals in Arizona, New Mexico, and Oklahoma.

The company ranked 279th in the 2021 Fortune 500, based on its 2020 revenue.

== History ==
General Appliance Corporation incorporated in 1947 and changed its name to Holly Corporation in 1952.

In 2003, Frontier Oil agreed to acquire Holly but Holly later cancelled the merger, leading to litigation.

In 2009, Holly Corporation acquired 2 refineries in Tulsa, Oklahoma: one from Sinclair Oil Corporation for $128 million and one from Sunoco.

In July 2011, Holly Corporation and Frontier Oil merged forming HollyFrontier Corporation.

In February 2017, the company acquired Suncor Energy's Petro-Canada Lubricants unit in Mississauga, Ontario, Canada for C$1.125 billion.

In early 2019, HollyFrontier acquired Sonneborn, a manufacturer of food grade white mineral oils and waxes in Petrolia, Pennsylvania, for $655 million.

In June 2020, HollyFrontier announced its Cheyenne refinery will cease processing petroleum, instead shifting production solely to renewable fuel, with the loss of approximately 200 workers.

In May 2021, HollyFrontier agreed to purchase the Shell Anacortes Refinery near Anacortes, Washington, with capacity of 149,000 bbl/d, for $350 million.

In August 2021, HollyFrontier agreed to purchase the assets of Sinclair Oil Corporation, including its two refineries near Casper, Wyoming, and Sinclair, Wyoming, for $2.6 billion. The succeeding company, HF Sinclair Corporation, finalized the merger in December 2023.

In March 14, 2022, HollyFrontier and Holly Energy Partners announced the completion of transactions with The Sinclair Companies and the establishment of the new parent company, HF Sinclair Corporation (NYSE:DINO).

In July 2022, HF Sinclair announced the layoff of approximately 87 people in the Sinclair, Wyoming refinery.

In December 2023, HF Sinclair Corporation announced the complete acquisition of Holly Energy Partners for a combination of HF Sinclair common stock and cash. As a result of the transaction, HEP Common Units will no longer be listed on the New York Stock Exchange and Holly Energy Partners ceased to be a publicly traded partnership.
