= John Philp Thompson Sr. =

American businessman and 7-Eleven founder

John Philp Thompson Sr. (November 2, 1925 – January 28, 2003), was the eldest son of Joe C. Thompson Sr., the founder of the 7-Eleven chain of convenience stores.

== Career ==
Although young, John Philp Thompson began his work in the business at an early age while it was still the Southland Ice Company and worked beside his father in its evolution from a small ice company into the Southland Corporation, which had expanded to include Oak Farms Dairy into its eventual "invention" of the convenience store concept. He served in the United States Navy from 1944 to 1946. By 1948, the Dallas Times Herald wrote that the young "Johnny Thompson" was destined to be one of "Tomorrow's Leaders".

Before his father, Joe C. Thompson, died in 1961, he passed the reins of the convenience store chain to John, who later grew it from a Texas chain into the global giant that in 1985 had total annual revenues exceeding $12.7 billion, taking the new concept of a convenience store into the world markets of Mexico, Japan, Far Eastern countries, Australia and Europe. John Philp Thompson again made history when under his guidance, Southland Corp. (7-Eleven) raised $81.5 million for the Muscular Dystrophy Association, prompting Jerry Lewis to write, "You accomplished so much, and you and your father before you built a monument. The good you've done will never be forgotten."

Thompson continued to measure the "monument" of the company not only by the numbers it produced, but by the good it could do. Oak Farms became the first national corporate sponsor of The March of Dimes, and 7-Eleven contributed to the purchase of land for a refuge for the American bald eagle via the National Wildlife Federation where he served on the Board of Directors. During his time as 7-Eleven's CEO, John also led the company to purchase CITGO Oil and Ticketmaster, overseeing their operations as well. It was this experience that led him to recognize the country's need for environmentally friendly energy options. When his innovative attempt to install "alternative fueling stations for electric cars" didn't work, he nevertheless stood by his belief that those with influence could and should seek ways to balance environmental stewardship with the need to create profit. He expressed this in the 1979 edition of U.S. News & World Report's "How to Get America Moving Again: 20 Leaders Tell What's Needed" when he said:

"We need to develop areas of mutual understanding. Environmentalists need to realize they will not get everything they want, and businessmen need to commit themselves to preserving the environment...we need to establish alternate energy resources and certainly some very definite conservation programs."

Thompson was a champion not only for environmental causes, but also for making education available to all. In 1989, the company began a literacy initiative, "People Who Read Achieve", which continues to raise funds for organizations that sponsor reading programs. He also was one of the primary founders and innovators of the Dallas Community College District Foundation's Rising Star Scholarship Program that sought to make college education available to children in Texas, and served as the Chairman of the Chancellor's Council for his state's universities. He joined his brothers, Jere W. Thompson Sr. and Jodie Thompson, in establishing the Joe C. Thompson Conference Center, dedicated to "providing excellent conference facilities, services, and programs for people to continue their educational development and personal enrichment."

As a result of serving on both boards related to public education institutions in the medical fields and as Chairman of Presbyterian Hospital, he became aware of the need for public and private medical institutions to be able to share research in order for greater strides to be made. This would prove to be a ten-year struggle of untangling bureaucratic tape, but eventually Thompson was awarded by Colin Powell for his tireless dedication towards paving the way for doctors and researchers from both public and private medical research facilities in the state of Texas to be able to share relevant information that could advance health for the greater community.

An avid leader of the local, national and international business and philanthropic communities, he was known for saying to other CEOs:

"CEOs are the world's unelected leaders. We are given positions of power that are conducive to leaders of a small country. Therefore, we are responsible to make all our decisions with people in mind and not just with the numbers they represent to us."

=== 7-Eleven ===
During Thompson's 48 years with the company, he guided The Southland Corp. as it grew from an ice company into the world's largest convenience store retailer. During his tenure, the company introduced the Slurpee, launching the frozen carbonated beverage (FCB) category in 1967. Fresh-brewed coffee-to-go was first offered in 1964, and the Big Gulp soft drink was launched in 1980.

The company opened regional distribution centers and began making specific merchandise deliveries to stores—an early version of the sophisticated inventory control and daily delivery system it uses today. Thompson oversaw the success of private label brands and the growth of Southland's in-house advertising department into the independent and award-winning Stanford Agency. Southland's growth included building what is now the Tower at Cityplace, a 42-story tower that housed the corporate offices of 7-Eleven until 2007.

Shortly before his father Joe C. Thompson's death in 1961, John Thompson became president of Southland, which then operated some 600 convenience stores. By the time he was named Chairman and CEO in 1969, the company had changed dramatically due to expansion into new markets and the acquisition of related businesses. As that decade closed, there were 3,810 7-Eleven stores, Gristede's grocery stores, Barricini candy shops and Bradshaw's supermarkets operating in 35 states, the District of Columbia and Canada.

Under Thompson's leadership, the company also began franchising 7-Eleven stores, introduced the "Oh Thank Heaven" slogan, and made its first public stock offering. During the 1970s and 1980s, 7-Eleven stores expanded into Mexico, Japan and other Far Eastern countries, Australia and Europe; and Southland acquired 50-percent interest from Cavenham Limited in some 350 retail stores in the United Kingdom.

From $120 million in sales in 1961, the company embarked on 24 consecutive years of record revenues including benchmark years in 1971 (first billion-dollar year), 1976 (first two-billion dollar year), 1978 (first three-billion dollar year) and 1979 (first billion-dollar quarter). Cracking Fortune magazine's list of the Top 50 merchandising firms in the United States at number 49 in 1965, the company moved up to 45th place in just one year...and leaped to 18th in 1975. By 1985, total annual revenues exceeded $12.7 billion.

== Appointments ==
=== Non-profit organizations - Board of Directors member ===
- Dallas Community Chest
- Goodwill Industries
- Hockaday School
- National Wildlife Federation
- Salvation Army's Advisory Board

=== Non-profit organizations - Chairman ===
- The Chancellor's Council
- Cotton Bowl Athletic Association
- Dallas Community College District Foundation Presbyterian Healthcare System
- Dallas Summer Musicals
- The Executive Committee of the Centennial Commission
- Friends of Fair Park
- Presbyterian Hospital of Dallas
- State Fair of Texas
- Texas Turnpike Authority

=== CEO ===
- 7-Eleven (Southland Corp.)
- Applause
- Cabel's
- Chief Auto Parts
- Chippenhook
- CITGO
- Good Humor
- Southland Ice
- Stanford Agency
- Thompson Real Estate
- Ticketmaster

== Honors ==
- 1972, The Anheuser-Busch $1 Billion Award was awarded to John Philp Thompson Sr. and his brother, Jere W. Thompson, in honor of their leading 7-Eleven to reach that benchmark.
- 1984, John Philp Thompson Sr. received the Distinguished Alumnus Award from UT.
- 1986, The University of Texas inducted John Philp Thompson into the College of Business Administration Hall of Fame.
- 1987, The Texas Turnpike Authority dedicated a tollway booth to him, on which a plaque states, "In recognition of 23 years of unceasing efforts in behalf of the Texas Turnpike Authority, under John Philp Thompson's leadership, the Dallas North Tollway became a reality."
- 1991 John Philp Thompson Sr. was inducted, along with his brother Jere, into Convenience Store News Magazine's Retailer Hall of Fame.
- 1996, John Philp Thompson Sr. received The Distinguished Health Service Award from the Dallas-Ft. Worth Hospital Council
- 1996, John Philp Thompson Sr. received The Outstanding Alumnus Award from the Dallas Texas Exes.
- 2002, the Dallas County College District Foundation named him Director Emeritus for his outstanding service and dedication.
- 2003, Fair Park and the State Fair of Texas named the only building on fair grounds ever dedicated to a person in his honor. He had served on the State Fair's board of directors for 40 years. This was the first time the fair had bestowed such an honor on an individual.
