= 7-Eleven Speak Out Wireless =

Mobile virtual network operator brand

7-Eleven SpeakOut Wireless
- Industry: Mobile virtual network operator
- Founded: April 2003
- Headquarters: Canada
- Products: Mobile telephony
- Website: www.speakout7eleven.ca

7-Eleven SpeakOut Wireless is a Canadian mobile virtual network operator brand for prepaid wireless service. The brand was launched in April 2003 by the 7-Eleven convenience store chain in the United States, and expanded to Canada in November 2005. 7-Eleven SpeakOut ceased operating in the United States in 2010.

The brand operates as a reseller of a virtual mobile network using Ztar Mobile, a mobile virtual network enabler (MVNE), on the Telus Mobility network in Canada. It provides service in all provinces except Quebec and also does not operate in the Canadian territories. In the United States, it used Ztar Mobile on the AT&T Mobility network.

SpeakOUT Wireless is currently in the process of upgrading its platform and working to secure a new long-term network partner to continue supporting your mobile service. In the meantime, because of the phasing out of the 3G infrastructure, some customers may experience reduced coverage, slower data, or service interruptions — particularly if using older devices.

== Services ==
SpeakOut offers pay-per-use plans and monthly plans, with monthly add-ons such as SMS, mobile browsing, and a block of minutes for domestic calls. In Canada, top-up and SIM card purchases are offered through an on-line website.

In eastern Ontario, where 7-Eleven demolished its one Kingston store and sold its six Ottawa locations to Quickie Convenience Stores, existing Ottawa SpeakOut subscribers were permitted to move their prepaid balances to Quickie's Good2Go cellphone program. That program has shorter expiry times for prepaid minutes.

Caller ID, call waiting, conference calling, voicemail and account notifications are standard features. International roaming is not supported. Access to voicemail from the mobile handset incurs local or long distance rates; messages also are retrievable by calling the mobile number from another telephone.

== See also ==
- List of defunct, merged and acquired US MVNO's
