= Chief Auto Parts =

US auto parts store

- Type: Private
- Industry: Retail
- Founded: 1955; 71 years ago in Norwalk, California
- Founder: Vern Johnson and Lorin Tuthill
- Defunct: July 1, 1998; 28 years ago
- Fate: Acquired by AutoZone
- Successor: AutoZone
- Headquarters: Dallas, Texas, U.S.
- Number of locations: 556 (1998)
- Area served: California, Texas, Tennessee, Nevada, Arizona, Arkansas
- Products: Auto parts

Chief Auto Parts was a United States–based auto parts store chain that had stores located in the states of Tennessee, Texas, Nevada, Arizona, Arkansas and California. Chief was founded in 1955 in Norwalk, California, by Vern Johnson and Lorin Tuthill. The company grew to 119 stores when it was sold to Southland in 1979. After passing through several different owners during the next two decades, the company grew to over 500 stores before it was sold to AutoZone in 1998.

== History ==
Chief was founded in 1955 in Norwalk, California, by Vern Johnson and Lorin Tuthill. The chain grew to 119 stores, mostly in California, by the time it was purchased by Southland in 1979. It was purchased by Southland Corporation in 1979, along with Citgo and Movie Quik. The company was based in Dallas, Texas, and operated as a division of Southland Corporation until 1990. The company expanded in 1985 by acquiring locations in Tennessee, Kentucky, and Alabama by purchasing Honey's Auto Parts in Nashville. At the same time, Chief also acquired 77 Checker Auto Parts locations in Oklahoma and Texas from Lucky Stores when Lucky decided to withdraw Checker from those areas.

In 1988, Southland sold Chief Auto Parts to an investor group led by Chief management and Shearson Lehman Brothers for $130 million. Six years later, Chief Auto Parts was acquired by Trust Company of the West, a Los Angeles–based investment group, and the management of Chief Auto Parts for an undisclosed amount to primarily pay off General Electric Capital which had acquired Shearson Lehman's share of the company. In 1995, Chief Auto Parts acquired Houston-based Hi-Lo Automotive, with its 191 stores in Texas, Louisiana and California, for $121 million. At the time of the acquisition, Chief had more than 500 stores in California, Texas, Nevada, Tennessee, Arkansas and Arizona.

In 1998, Trust Company of the West sold Chief to Memphis, Tennessee–based AutoZone for $280 million in cash and debt assumption. At the time of the sale, Chief had 556 auto parts stores. From 1992 until its merger with AutoZone, the company's CEO was David H. Eisenberg.
