= Reddy Ice =

American packaged ice manufacturer

Reddy Ice Holdings, Inc.
- Company type: Private
- Industry: Fast-moving consumer goods
- Headquarters: Dallas, Texas, U.S.
- Key people: Lonny Warner, Chairman/CEO
- Products: Packaged ice
- Number of employees: 1,600
- Website: www.reddyice.com

Reddy Ice (stylized ReddyIce) is the largest packaged ice manufacturer in the United States, serving approximately 82,000 customer locations under the Reddy Ice brand name.

It was originally formed in 1972 as a division of the Southland Corporation (the parent company of 7-Eleven), who sold it off to what would become Suiza Foods in 1988. It was sold to private investors in 2000 and went public on the New York Stock Exchange in 2005.

The company declared Chapter 11 bankruptcy in April 2012, in Dallas, citing $434 million in assets against $531 million in liabilities. Centerbridge Partners invested and assumed control of Reddy Ice. Stone Canyon Industries Holdings LLC, purchased Reddy Ice in July 2019 from Centerbridge Partners.

On January 16, 2013, their CEO Gilbert Cassagne resigned, the position was taken over by Bill Corbin, who was named board chairman in November. Deb Conklin was CEO from July 2019 to December 2022. In January 2023, Lonny Warner was named CEO.
