= Daily Stop =

Hong Kong convenience store chain

Daily Stop 地利店
- Type: Privately owned company
- Industry: Convenient stores
- Founded: 1982; 44 years ago
- Defunct: 2004; 22 years ago
- Fate: Merged to 7-Eleven
- Headquarters: Hong Kong
- Area served: Hong Kong
- Parent: TVB (1982–1988); TVE Holdings (1988–1996); SCMP Group (1996–2004); Merged to 7-Eleven (2004)

Daily Stop (Chinese: 地利店) was a chain of convenience stores in Hong Kong. It was franchised by Television Broadcasts Limited (TVB) and SCMP Group before it was acquired by Dairy Farm International Holdings and merged to 7-Eleven. It operated totally 83 outlets in MTR and KCR stations, shopping malls and public housing estates. Its main competitors were 7-Eleven and Circle K.

== History ==
Daily Stop was established in 1982 to sell TVB-related products. In 1988, it became a subsidiary of TVE Holdings. In 1996, it was acquired by Robert Kuok's Kerry Group and became a subsidiary of SCMP Group. In 2004, it was sold to Dairy Farm International Holdings and rebranded as "7-Eleven".
