= Buy the Way =

South Korean convenience store chain (1990–2010)

- Native name: 바이더웨이
- Type: Subsidiary
- Industry: Convenience Store
- Founded: 1991
- Defunct: January 2010
- Fate: Merged with 7-Eleven (acquired by Korea Seven Co., Ltd.)
- Successor: 7-Eleven (South Korea only)
- Area served: South Korea
- Parent: Korea Seven Co., Ltd.

Buy the Way (Korean: 바이더웨이) was a South Korean chain of convenience stores that are now defunct, after being sold to Korea Seven Co., Ltd. in January 2010. The company was founded in June 1990. An unrelated convenience store chain by this name still operates at gas stations in Israel.

== History ==
Originally, Buy the Way was owned by the Dongyang Group, and was called "Dongyang Mart" for a brief time. Then, in 1991, the chain was renamed to Buy the Way. February 1991 saw the opening of the first stores in Shinchon, Seodaemun-gu, Seoul, and Sinchon. By 2005, there were more than 1,000 Buy the Way stores in South Korea. The chain was sold to Korea Retail Holdings in 2005, and finally was sold to Korea Seven Co., Ltd in January 2010. From then on, Buy the Way stores were gradually changed to 7-Eleven stores.
