= Movie Quik =

MovieQuik, often misreported in the news as Movie Quik, was a VHS video and VCR rental service offered inside 7-Eleven stores, a division of Southland Corporation, based in the United States and provided by MovieQuik Systems, another fully owned division of Southland during the late 1980s.

After a few trial runs in isolated areas, the service was launched nationally in 1986. The movies were merchandised on the first gondola at the front of the store and were visible through the front window. Movie-Quik stocked approximately 200 titles in each store. This service was unusual for the time since rentals were available 24 hours a day, there was no membership fees, and rental fees were affordable (as low as US$0.99 per day for some video rentals and $4.99 per day for VCR rentals in some areas).

When Cevaxs took over the service, there was a small machine distributed by Cevaxs at the checkout counter that the store clerk used to check in and check out movies to the customers.

To help pay for the relatively recent and very expensive leveraged buyout by the family of the former founders, Dallas based MovieQuik was later sold a few months later in 1987 to a Vancouver based video rental distributor called Cevaxs for $132 million (equivalent to about $365M in 2024). Cevaxs had previously provided similar services to 7-Eleven stores in its native Canada. Cevaxs was forced to shut down the service in 1990 due to the overwhelming debt acquired by the purchase of MovieQuik from Southland.
