= Quickie Convenience Stores =

Eastern Ontario-based convenience store chain

Quickie Convenience Stores (in French, Dépanneurs Quickie), also branded as Quickie Mart, is a chain of convenience stores based in Ottawa, Ontario, Canada, founded in 1973. In October 2012, it had 50 stores in Eastern Ontario and Western Quebec, approximately 300 store employees, and about 20 full-time personnel. By November 2021, the chain consisted of 51 convenience stores in the greater Ottawa-Gatineau area and elsewhere in Eastern Ontario (Kemptville, Smiths Falls, Cornwall, Kingston, Brockville, and Merrickville). Quickie also owned 22 gas stations across eastern Ontario and western Quebec.

In addition to standard convenience stores items, many Quickie stores provide bank machines, branded gasoline, complete postal services, first run videos and franchised food products.

Quickie acquired the Ottawa-area stores of 7-Eleven in 2009.

In November 2021, Quickie was acquired by MacEwen Petroleum, which is based in Maxville, Ontario. MacEwen plans to convert its 22 County Line convenience stores to the Quickie banner.
