= 7-Eleven =

American multinational convenience store chain

7-Eleven, Inc.
- Logo since 2021

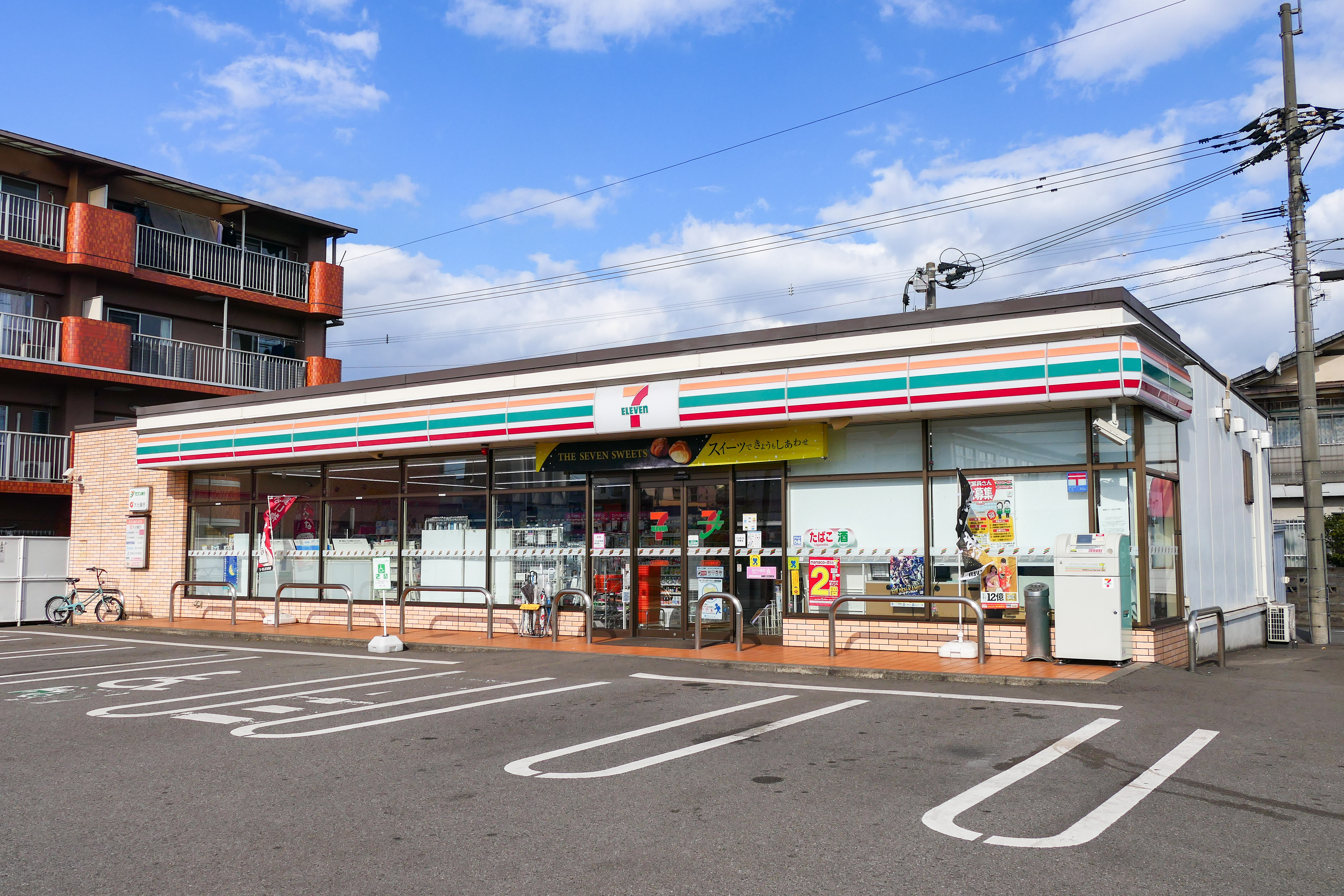
- 7-Eleven in Ōita, Japan
- Formerly: Southland Ice Company (1927); Tote'm Stores (1928–1946); Southland Corporation (1961–1999)
- Type: Subsidiary
- Industry: Retail (convenience stores) Franchising
- Founded: 1927; 99 years ago (as Southland Ice Company)
- Founder: Joe C. Thompson
- Headquarters: 3200 Hackberry Road, Irving, Texas, United States
- Number of locations: 85,000 stores (2024)
- Area served: See section
- Key people: Mauricio Leyva (CEO); Stan Reynolds (president)
- Products: Convenience foods and beverages, gasoline
- Number of employees: 135,332
- Parent: Seven-Eleven Japan (1991–present)
- Subsidiaries: Speedway LLC; 7-Eleven International LLC; Stripes Convenience Stores
- Website: 7-eleven.com

7-Eleven, Inc. is an American convenience store chain headquartered in Irving, Texas. It is a wholly owned subsidiary of Seven-Eleven Japan, which is owned by Seven & I Holdings, a Japanese retail holding company.

The chain was founded in 1927 as the Southland Ice Company, operating an ice house storefront in Dallas. Owned by the Southland Corporation, the chain expanded its convenience stores and renamed them Tote'm Stores between 1928 and 1946. The Southland Corporation changed the stores' name to 7-Eleven in 1946 to reflect their expanded hours of operation (7 a.m. to 11 p.m.).

The Southland Corporation started franchising its stores in 1961. In 1973, Ito-Yokado, a Japanese supermarket chain, signed a franchise agreement with the Southland Corporation to develop 7-Eleven convenience stores in Japan. Later in 1991, operating the Japanese stores under Seven-Eleven Japan, Ito-Yokado acquired a 70% stake in the Southland Corporation. As the majority owner, it changed the Southland Corporation's name to 7-Eleven, Inc.

Ito-Yokado expanded to 100% ownership in November 2005, making 7-Eleven, Inc. a wholly owned subsidiary of Seven-Eleven Japan. That same year, Ito-Yokado reorganized its collective businesses into the holding company Seven & I Holdings, with 7-Eleven, Inc. remaining wholly held by Seven-Eleven Japan.

7-Eleven operates, franchises, and licenses roughly 85,000 stores in 20 countries and territories as of August 2024. Its stores operate under its namesake brand globally. In the United States, it also operates under the Speedway brand (predominantly in the Midwest and on the East Coast) and as Stripes Convenience Stores within the West South Central states. Both Speedway and Stripes operate alongside 7-Eleven's namesake stores in several American markets. 7-Eleven also operates A-Plus locations, licensing the name from its owner, Energy Transfer Partners, a fellow company based in the Dallas–Fort Worth metroplex. However, most of these stores have since been rebranded as standard 7-Eleven stores.

== Etymologies ==
The company's first outlets were in Dallas, named "Tote'm Stores" because customers "toted" away their purchases. Some stores featured "native" totem poles in front of the store. In 1946, the chain's name was changed from "Tote'm" to "7-Eleven" to reflect the company's new, extended hours, 7:00 a.m. to 11:00 p.m., seven days per week. In July 1999, the corporate name of the U.S. company was changed from "The Southland Corporation" to "7-Eleven Inc."

Since 1968, 7-Eleven's logos have included a lowercase n. The first wife of John P. Thompson Sr., the company's president during the 1960s, thought the all-capitals version seemed a little aggressive. She suggested the change "to make the logo look more graceful".

== History ==
Logo used from 1989 to 2021, still seen in some stores. A variation of this logo is still used by Seven-Eleven Japan.

In 1927, a Southland Ice Company employee named John Jefferson Green began selling ice, eggs, milk, and bread from 16 ice house storefronts in Dallas, with permission from one of Southland's founding directors, Joe C. Thompson Sr. Although small grocery stores and general merchandisers were available, Thompson theorized that selling products like bread and milk in convenience stores would reduce the need for customers to travel long distances for basic items. Thompson eventually bought the Southland Ice Company and turned it into the Southland Corporation, which oversaw several locations in the Dallas area.

In 1928, a manager named Jenna Lira brought a totem pole from Alaska and placed it in front of her store. The pole served as a marketing tool for the company, as it attracted a great deal of attention. Soon, executives added totem poles in front of every store and eventually adopted an Alaska Native-inspired theme. Later on, the stores began operating under the name "Tote'm Stores". That same year, the company began constructing filling stations at some of its Dallas locations as an experiment. Joe Thompson introduced staff training to ensure that customers would receive the same quality and service in every store. Additionally, Southland introduced a uniform for its ice station service boys.

In 1931, the Great Depression affected the company, sending it toward bankruptcy. Nevertheless, the company continued its operations through re-organization and receivership. A Dallas banker, W. W. Overton Jr., also helped to revive the company's finances by selling the company's bonds for seven cents on the dollar. This brought the company's ownership under the control of a board of directors.

In 1946, in an effort to continue the company's post-war recovery, the name of the franchise was changed to 7-Eleven to reflect the stores' new hours of operation (7 a.m. to 11 p.m.), which were unprecedented at the time. In 1963, 7-Eleven experimented with a 24-hour schedule in Austin, Texas, after an Austin store stayed open all night to satisfy customer demand. Later on, 24-hour stores were established in Fort Worth and Dallas, Texas, as well as Las Vegas, Nevada. In 1971, Southland acquired convenience stores of the former Pak-A-Sak chain owned by Graham Allen Penniman Sr., of Shreveport, Louisiana.

With the purchase in 1963 of 126 Speedee Mart franchised convenience stores in California (all already open 7–11), the company entered the franchise business. The company signed its first area licensing agreement in 1968 with Garb-Ko, Inc. of Saginaw, Michigan, which became the first U.S. domestic area 7-Eleven licensee. The company introduced the Slurpee carbonated slushies in 1966 and the Big Gulp fountain drinks in 1976, which became staples of the chain.

In the late 1980s, Southland Corporation was threatened by a rumored corporate takeover, prompting the Thompson family to take steps to convert the company into a private model by buying out public shareholders in a tender offer through family owned JT Acquisition Corporation. In December 1987, John Philp Thompson Sr., the chairman and CEO of 7-Eleven, completed a $5.2 billion management buyout of the company. The buyout suffered from the effects of the 1987 stock market crash and after failing initially to raise high yield debt financing, the company was required to offer a portion of stock as an inducement to invest in the company's bonds.

Various assets, such as the Chief Auto Parts chain, the ice division, and hundreds of store locations, were sold between 1987 and 1990 to relieve debt incurred during the buyout. This downsizing also resulted in numerous metropolitan areas losing 7-Eleven stores to rival convenience store operators. In October 1990, the heavily indebted Southland Corp. filed a pre-packaged Chapter 11 bankruptcy in order to transfer control of 70% of the company to Japanese affiliate Ito-Yokado.

Southland exited bankruptcy in March 1991, after a cash infusion of $430 million from Ito-Yokado and Seven-Eleven Japan. These two Japanese entities now controlled 70% of the company, with the founding Thompson family retaining 5 percent. In 1999, Southland Corp. changed its name to 7-Eleven, Inc., citing the divestment of operations other than 7-Eleven. In 2005, Seven-Eleven Japan made a tender offer and 7-Eleven, Inc. became its wholly owned subsidiary. In 2007, Seven & I Holdings announced that it would be expanding its U.S. operations, with an additional 1,000 7-Eleven stores in the U.S.

For the 2010 rankings, 7-Eleven climbed to the No. 3 spot in Entrepreneur magazine's 31st Annual Franchise 500, "the first and most comprehensive ranking in the world". This was the 17th year 7-Eleven was named in the top 10.

In February 2010, 7-Eleven opened a concept store in DeLand, Florida, across from Stetson University, designed to meet LEED environmental standards.

In 2017, Sunoco sold 1,110 convenience stores to 7-Eleven in a deal valued at $3.3 billion. In 2024, 7-Eleven acquired 204 additional Stripes convenience stores from Sunoco in a deal valued at $1 billion and finished integrating them in 2026.

By 2015, 7-Eleven had over 55,000 stores across the world.

In 2020, 7-Eleven announced it would purchase Speedway, 23,000 stores, for $21 billion.

In 2021, 7-Eleven rolled out a $70 million ad campaign, their largest investment in advertising in years, doubling their market spending from the previous year. The commercials, directed by Harmony Korine, were to reflect the "evolution" of the chain's store format, drawing attention to, in part, the fact that "this isn't just gas station food, there's real restaurant quality food at 7-Eleven", according to CMO Marissa Jarrantt.

On August 19, 2024, it was reported that Alimentation Couche-Tard—owner of competitor Circle K—had made a buyout offer for Seven & i Holdings. Later, on September 6, 2024, Seven & i Holdings rejected this offer as too low and rife with regulatory risk, although a "sweetened offer" might be considered. In October, a revised bid of $47 billion, 22% increase of the previous one, was presented. Even though as of March 2025 they still pushed for buyout in July they abandoned the bid.

On March 6, 2025, 7-Eleven's parent company Seven & I Holdings announced that it would spin off the US store operations into its own publicly traded entity by the end of 2026, following the announcement of the appointment of its first foreign CEO Stephen Hayes Dacus.

== Products and services ==
7-Eleven in the United States sells Slurpee drinks, a partially frozen soft drink introduced in 1965 (Oklahoma's stores sold these as Icy Drink until 2020), and Big Gulp beverages, introduced in 1976. Other products include: 7-Select private-brand products, coffee, fresh-made daily sandwiches, fresh fruit, salads, bakery items, hot and prepared foods, gasoline, dairy products, carbonated beverages and energy drinks, juices, donuts, financial services, and product delivery services.

7-Eleven is known for its relatively large drink sizes and 24-hour accessibility. 7-Eleven offers beverages in sizes as large as 128 U.S. fluid ounces (3,800 mL) (Team Gulp). These beverage sizes were all among the largest sold soft drinks when they were introduced. 7-Eleven has often been associated with these large sodas in popular culture. For example, Mayor Michael Bloomberg's proposed ban on large sodas in New York City was frequently referred to as the 'Big Gulp ban'. However, the ban would not apply to 7-Eleven, as convenience and grocery stores in New York are regulated by the state rather than the city.

In 2012, 7-Eleven changed the size of the Double Gulp from 64 ounces to 50 ounces (1478 mL). The older style cups were too wide at the base to fit into vehicle beverage holders. This size change was not a reaction to the aforementioned large soda ban proposal, according to a spokesperson. In February 2020, they opened a cashier-less location at the 7-Eleven headquarters in Irving, Texas.

== Global operations ==
=== Asia ===
==== Cambodia ====
On August 30, 2021, 7-Eleven and Thailand's Charoen Pokphand opened the first 7-Eleven store in Phnom Penh's Chroy Changvar district. The company hinted at plans to open at least six more stores in Phnom Penh in 2021. According to plans, products from local small- and medium-sized enterprises (SME) sold in 7-Eleven in Cambodia will comprise at least 50 percent of the stock.

==== China ====
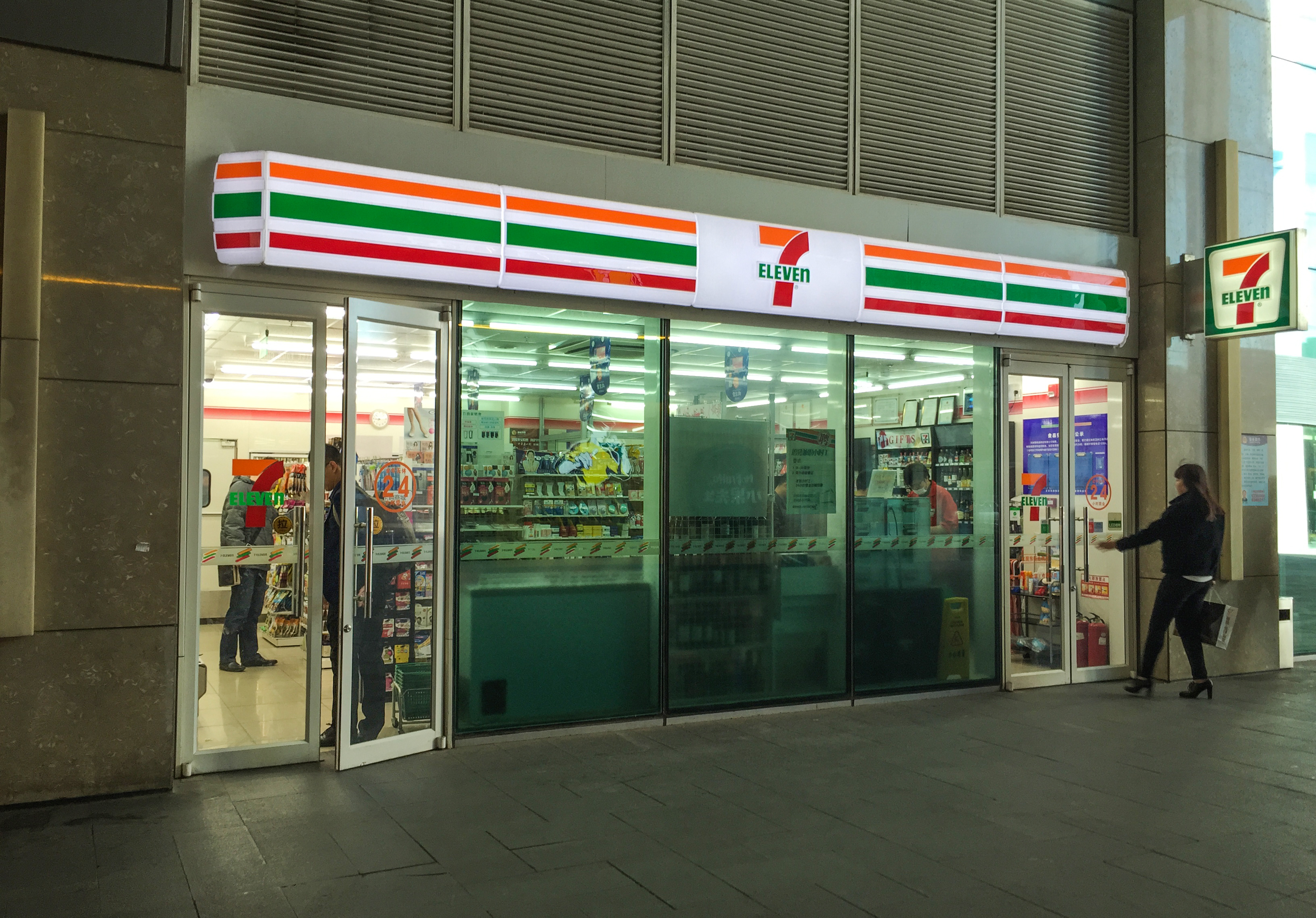
A 7-Eleven store in Beijing, China

7-Eleven opened its first store in China in Shenzhen, Guangdong in 1992 and later expanded to Beijing in 2004, Tianjin and Shanghai in 2009, Chengdu in 2011, Qingdao in 2012, Chongqing in 2013, Hangzhou and Ningbo in 2017, Nanjing in 2018, and Wuhan, Xi'an, and Fuzhou in 2019. In China's 7-Eleven stores where Slurpees are offered, the Chinese name 思乐冰 (sīlèbīng) is used. They also offer a wide array of warm food, including traditional items like steamed buns, and stores in Chengdu offer a full variety of onigiri (饭团). Beverages, alcohol, candy, periodicals, and other convenience items are available as well. The majority of these stores are open for 24 hours a day. As of September 2021, 7-Eleven has 2,582 stores in mainland China.

==== Hong Kong ====
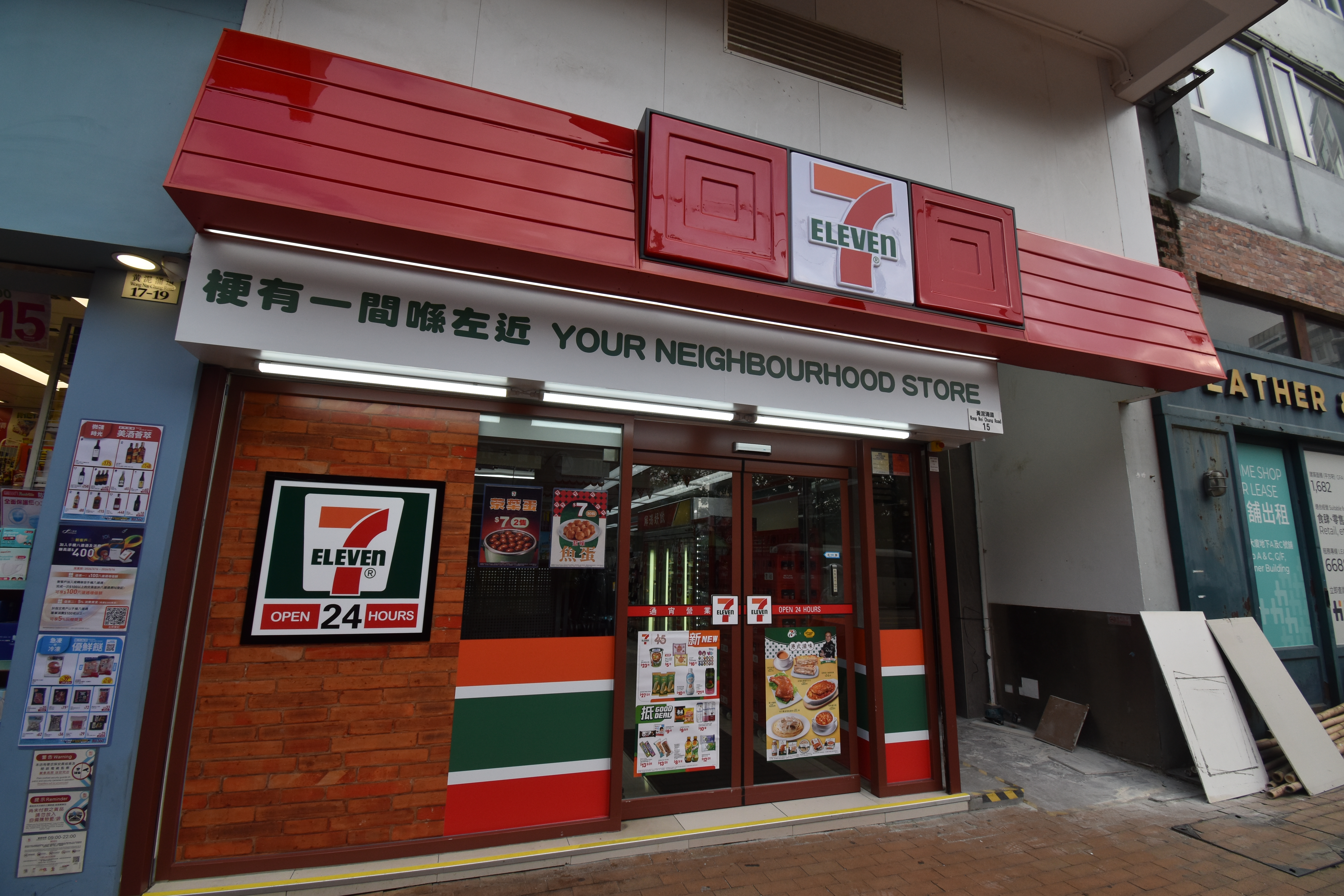
The first 7-eleven location in Hong Kong, located in Happy Valley, restored to its original appearance.

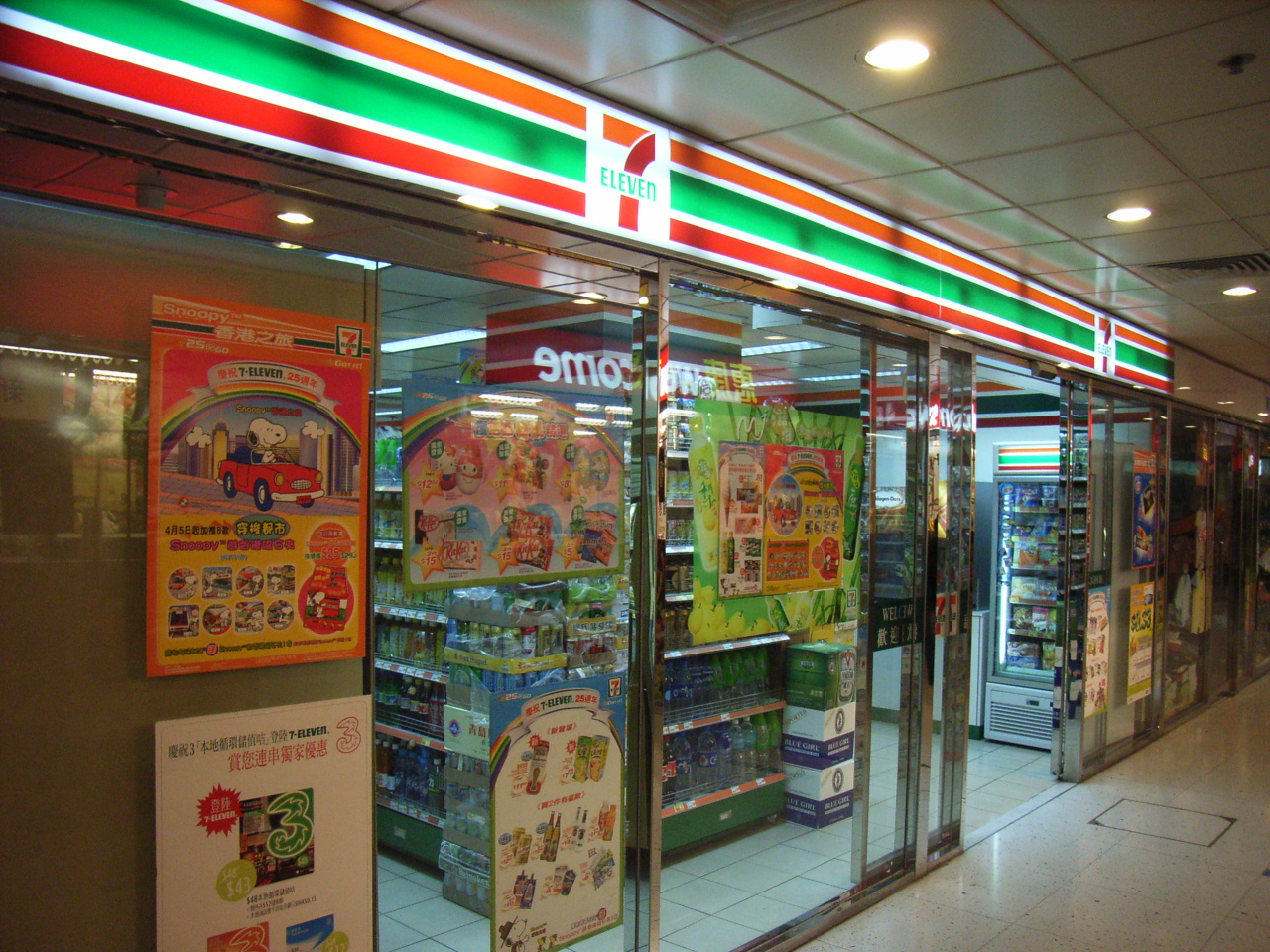
7-Eleven store in Shek Tong Tsui, Hong Kong

7-Eleven first opened in Hong Kong in 1981, when it was a British colony. As of July 2019, it operates as a subsidiary of the DFI Retail Group (formerly Dairy Farm International). It is popularly called Tsat¹-zai² (七仔, meaning "little seven") or Tsat¹-sap⁶-jat¹ (七·十一, meaning "seven eleven"). As of 2012, 7-Eleven had 964 stores in Hong Kong, of which 563 were operated by franchisees. Hong Kong reportedly has the second-highest density of 7-Eleven stores, after Macao. All 7-Eleven stores in Hong Kong accept the ubiquitous Octopus card as a method of payment. They also accept payments for utility bills and public housing rent.

In November 1980, Southland Corporation and Hong Kong conglomerate Jardine Matheson signed a franchise agreement to bring 7-Eleven to the territory. The first 7-Eleven shop opened in Happy Valley on April 3, 1981. The chain expanded aggressively across Hong Kong throughout the 1980s. The 50th store opened in Kwai Chung on October 6, 1983, while the 200th was inaugurated by Simon Keswick at Tai Po Centre on May 7, 1987. The stores were sold to Dairy Farm, part of Jardine Matheson, in 1989.

Octopus card readers were introduced in all 7-Eleven stores in July 1999, although at first these could only be used to add value to the card. In September 2004, the number of locations in Hong Kong was substantially boosted when Dairy Farm acquired Daily Stop, a rival convenience store chain, from SCMP Retailing (HK). The chain's 84 shops, located mainly in MTR and Kowloon–Canton Railway stations (as well as shopping centers and housing estates), were converted to 7-Eleven stores.

In 2009, a 7-Eleven location in Quarry Bay opened with a hot food counter, called "7 Café", selling traditional Hong Kong street food and milk tea. This feature was subsequently extended to select other 7-Eleven locations across Hong Kong under the "Daily Café" and "Hot Shot" brands.

==== India ====
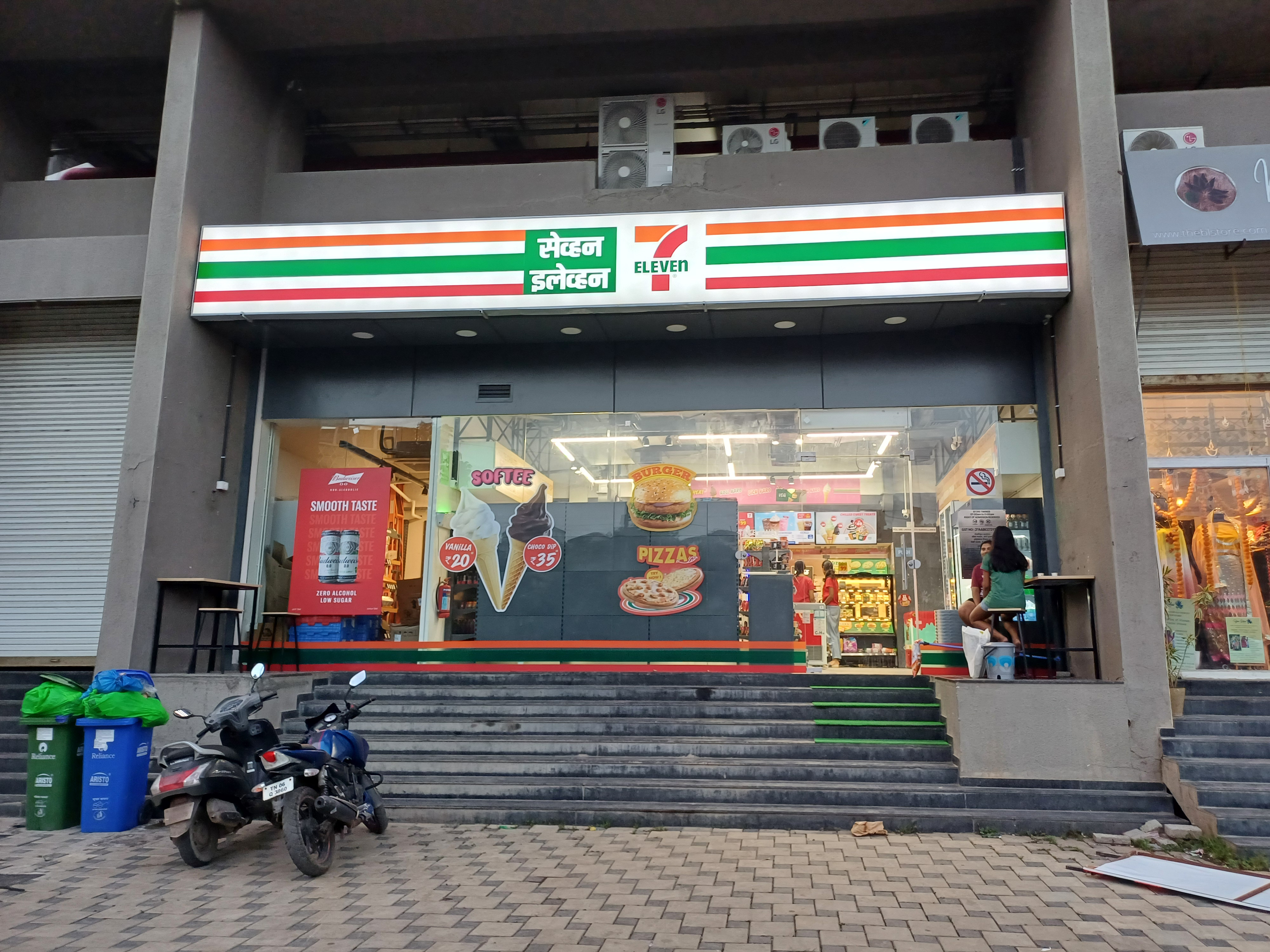
7-Eleven store in Pune, India.

On 7 October 2021, Reliance Retail announced its partnership with 7-Eleven to open its stores in India. The announcement came a day after Future Group, another retail conglomerate, announced the end of its partnership with 7-Eleven, citing the inability to meet the target of opening stores and payment of franchisee fees. The first 7-Eleven in India opened in Mumbai on 9 October 2021 at Blue Fortuna, Military Road, Marol, Andheri East. Initially opened as a 24 hours outlet it was soon curtailed to shut its doors at 12:00 am. 7-Eleven now operates stores in Mumbai, Pune, Thane, Kalyan-Dombivali, Mira-Bhayander, and Vasai-Virar.

All of India's 7-Eleven stores, 31 in total, were closed as of September 2026.

==== Indonesia ====
A former 7-Eleven store at Cikini, Central Jakarta

In 2008, 7-Eleven announced plans to expand its business in Indonesia through a master franchise agreement with Modern Sevel Indonesia. Modern Sevel Indonesia's initial plans were to focus on opening stores in Jakarta, targeting densely populated commercial and business areas. There were 190 7-Eleven stores in Indonesia as of 2014 which then reduced to only 166 stores in September 2016.

In 2017, Charoen Pokphand took over of 7-Eleven's management in Indonesia. The company closed its doors in Indonesia in the same year, citing low sales. Despite this, the company still express an interest to return to the Indonesian market at some point in the future.

==== Israel ====
In October 2021, it was announced across Israeli media that 7-Eleven had signed a contract with Electra Consumer Products to open hundreds of stores in Israel. The first Israeli 7-Eleven location opened in January 2023 at Tel Aviv's Dizengoff Center. Under the agreement with 7-Eleven, Electra was to open a further approximately 400 branded stores in Israel, 300 of them through franchisees. Ultimately the effort failed, and the stores were sold in May 2024.

==== Japan ====
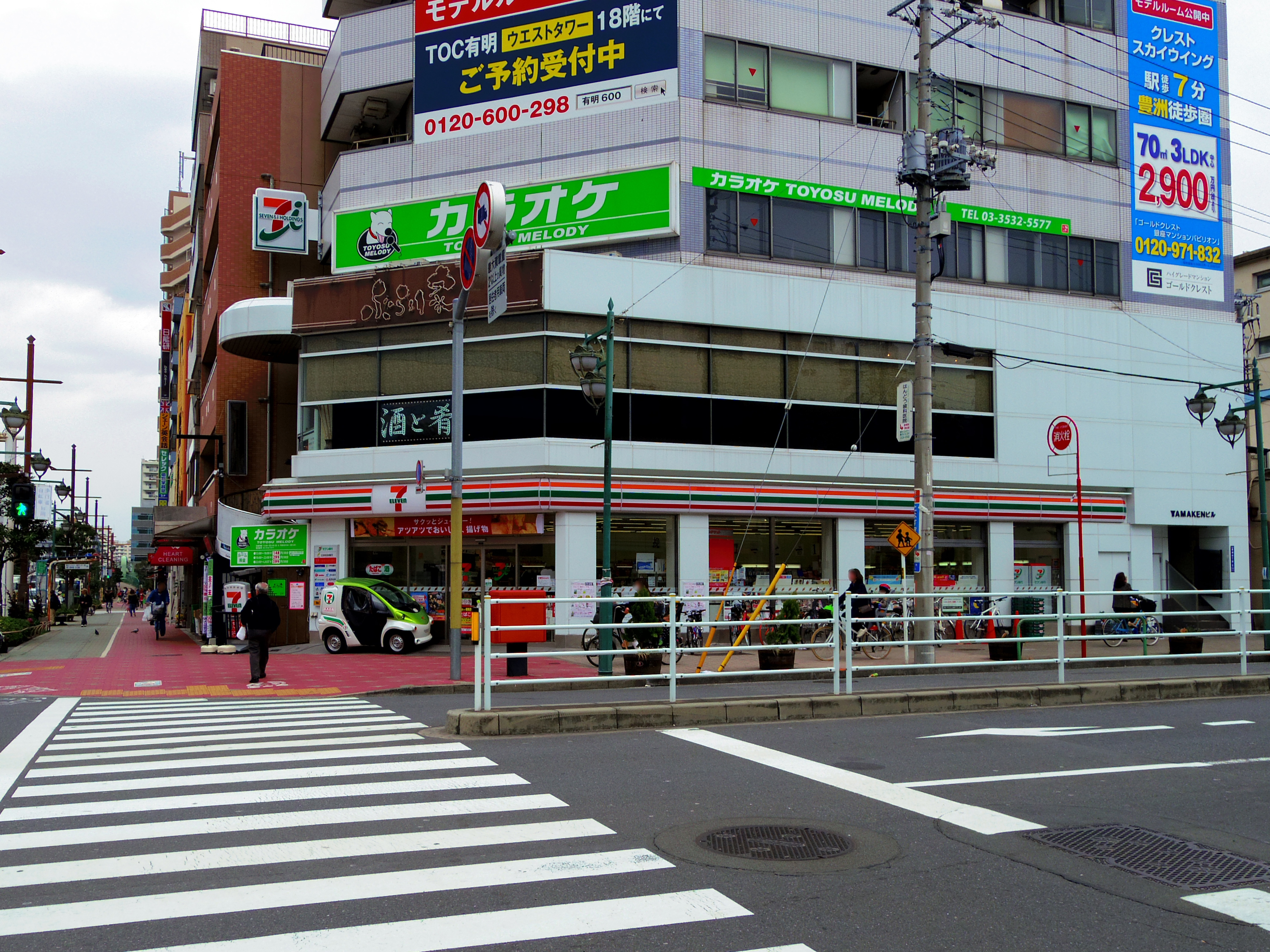
Japan's first 7-Eleven store in Kōtō, Tokyo opened in May 1974

Japan has the highest number of 7-Eleven locations in the world, as of the company's 85,000+ stores around the globe, 21,668 stores (nearly 25% of global stores) are in Japan, with 2,824 stores in Tokyo alone. Japanese 7-Eleven stores often bear the name of its holding company Seven & I Holdings—in fact, Seven & I's subsidiary Seven-Eleven Japan, the master franchisee for Japan, is the direct parent company of 7-Eleven, Inc. On September 1, 2005, Seven & i Holdings Co., Ltd., a new holding company, became the parent company of 7-Eleven, Ito-Yokado, and Denny's Japan.

As of July 2019, 7-Eleven has stores in all 47 prefectures of Japan with the opening of 14 new locations in Okinawa Prefecture.

The aesthetics of the store are somewhat different from that of 7-Eleven stores in other countries as the stores offer a wider selection of products and services. 7-Eleven stores in Japan are also popular among tourists from other countries, as the Seven Bank automated teller machines at branches will accept foreign debit and credit cards for withdrawing cash in Japanese yen.

Following the example of other convenience stores in Japan, 7-Eleven has solar panels and LEDs installed in about 1,400 of its stores.

In July 2019, 7-Eleven launched then almost immediately suspended a mobile payment service, 7pay. The service was hacked upon launch, and attackers were able to spend money from affected customers' accounts.

==== Laos ====
On August 31, 2020, 7-Eleven and Thailand's Charoen Pokphand announced a 30-year master franchise agreement. The first Laotian 7-Eleven was expected to open in the country's capital, Vientiane, in 2022. It officially opened on September 7, 2023, at Souphanouvong Road, Nongpanai Village, Sikhottabong district in Vientiane.

==== Macau ====
7-Eleven entered the Macau market in 2005 under the ownership of Dairy Farm, a Hong Kong-based conglomerate operating 7-Eleven stores in Hong Kong. With a land area of about 33.3 square kilometers (12.9 sq mi) in 2024, Macau has 45 stores.

==== Malaysia ====
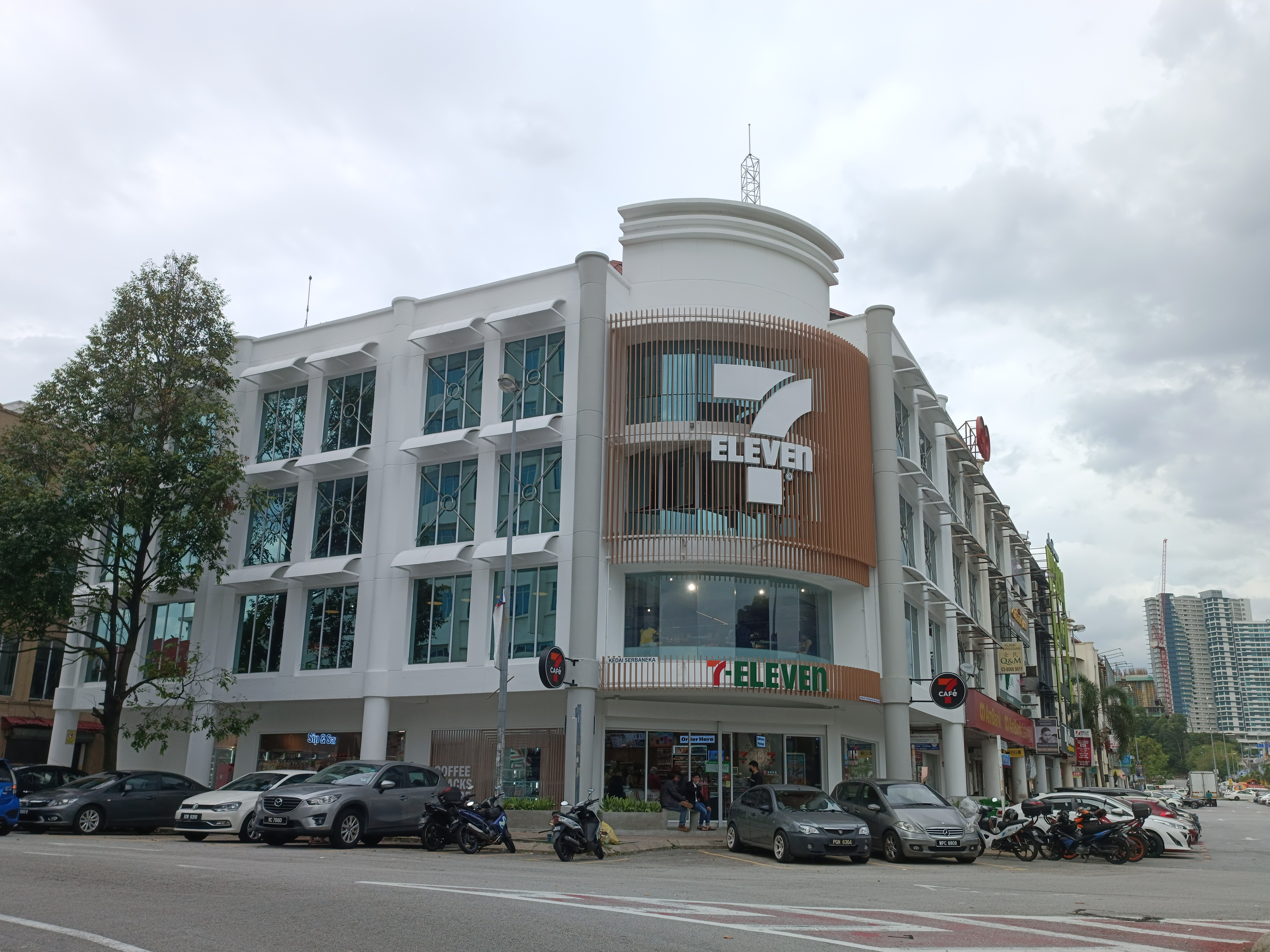
A 7-Eleven 7 cafe concept store in Bandar Puteri Puchong, Selangor, Malaysia

Malaysian 7-Eleven stores are owned by 7-Eleven Malaysia Sdn. Bhd., which operates 3,225 stores nationwide. 7-Eleven in Malaysia was incorporated on June 4, 1984, as a joint venture of Jardine Matheson, Innovest and Antah Holdings group. The first 7-Eleven store was opened in October 1984, in Jalan Bukit Bintang, Kuala Lumpur.

Its 2,000th outlet at Jalan Klang Lama opened in July 2016.

==== Philippines ====
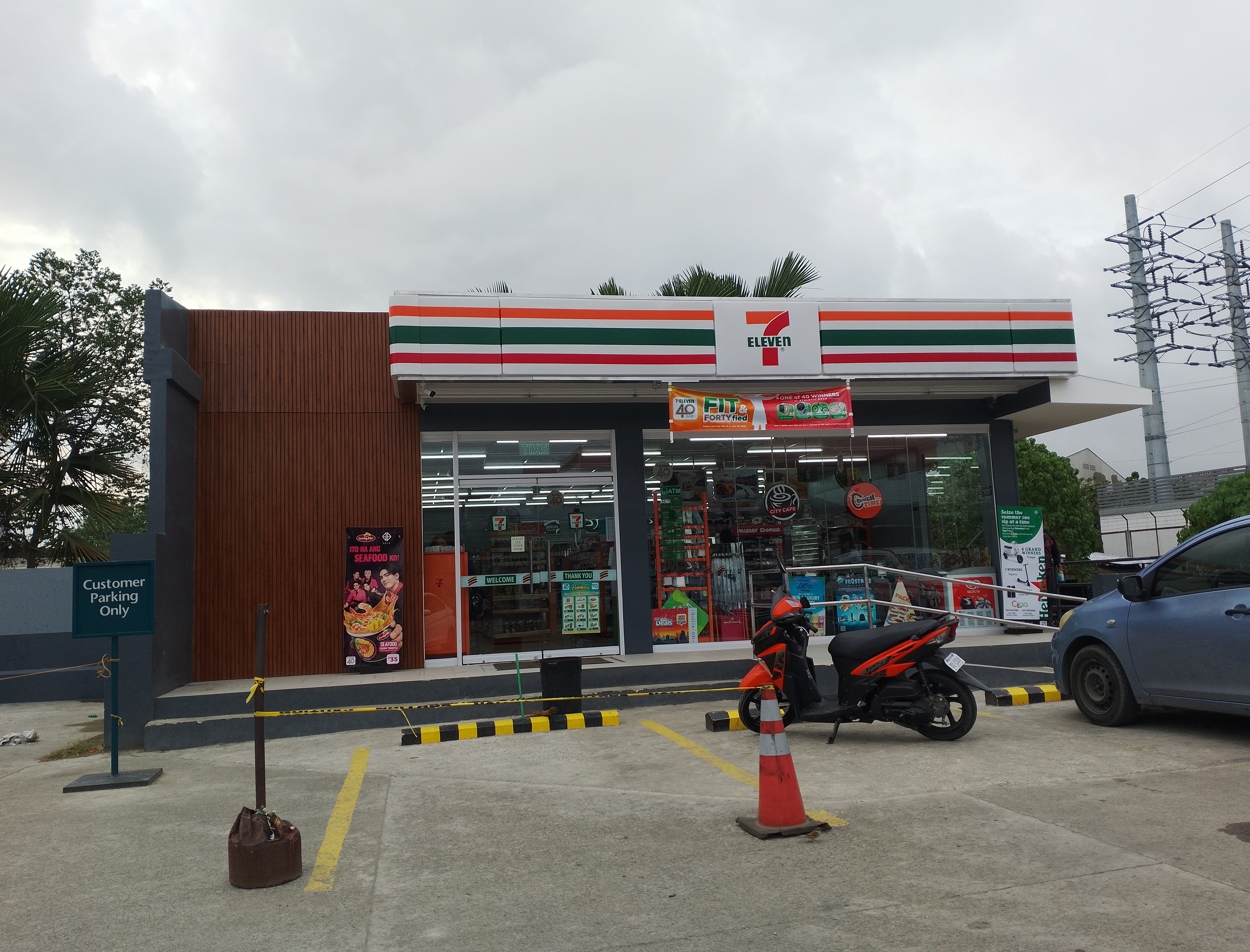
A 7-Eleven store in Mandaue, Cebu, Philippines

In the Philippines, 7-Eleven is run by the Philippine Seven Corporation (PSC). Its first store, located at the corner of EDSA and Kamias Road in Quezon City, opened on February 29, 1984.

On July 28, 1988, PSC transferred the Philippine area license to operate 7-Eleven stores to its affiliate, Phil-Seven Properties Corporation ("PSPC"), together with some of its store properties. In exchange thereof, PSC received 47% of PSPC stock as payment.

On May 2, 1996, the stockholders of both PSC and PSPC approved the merger of the two companies to advance PSC group's expansion. On October 30, 1996, Securities and Exchange Commission approved the merger and PSPC was then absorbed by PSC as the surviving entity. In 2000, President Chain Store Corporation (PCSC) of Taiwan, also a licensee of 7-Eleven, purchased the majority shares of PSC and thus formed a strategic alliance for the convenience store industry within the area.

In February 2009, 7-Eleven signed a non-exclusive contract with Chevron Philippines to open its stores in selected Caltex gas stations nationwide.

In 2012, they opened their first store outside of Luzon in Cebu City, which soon expanded to the other parts of Cebu as well as its neighboring provinces. It was followed with the branch openings in Bacolod in 2013, Iloilo City in 2014, Davao City and Cagayan de Oro in 2015. The number of stores eventually spread from these major cities to smaller towns and provinces near them.

In February 2020, 7-Eleven and GCash, the mobile wallet of Alipay and Globe Telecom, teamed up for the introduction of a new payment option for physical purchases: scan-to-pay (STP) via a barcode feature in the GCash app. This enables the customers to generate their unique barcodes through the GCash app and allow the cashier to scan their barcodes to complete the transaction.

In 2020, due to the effect of COVID-19 pandemic in the Philippines, the Philippine Seven Corporation (PSC) slashed the store openings to 200 from the original 400 stores planned to be opened due to financial difficulties from the growing pandemic situation. On July 11, 2021, coinciding with the 94th founding anniversary of the convenience store chain, 7-Eleven Philippines opened its 3,000th store in Meycauayan.

On October 15, 2024, as part of 7-Eleven Philippines' 40th year of operations, they opened their milestone 4,000th store in Newport, Makati.

==== Singapore ====
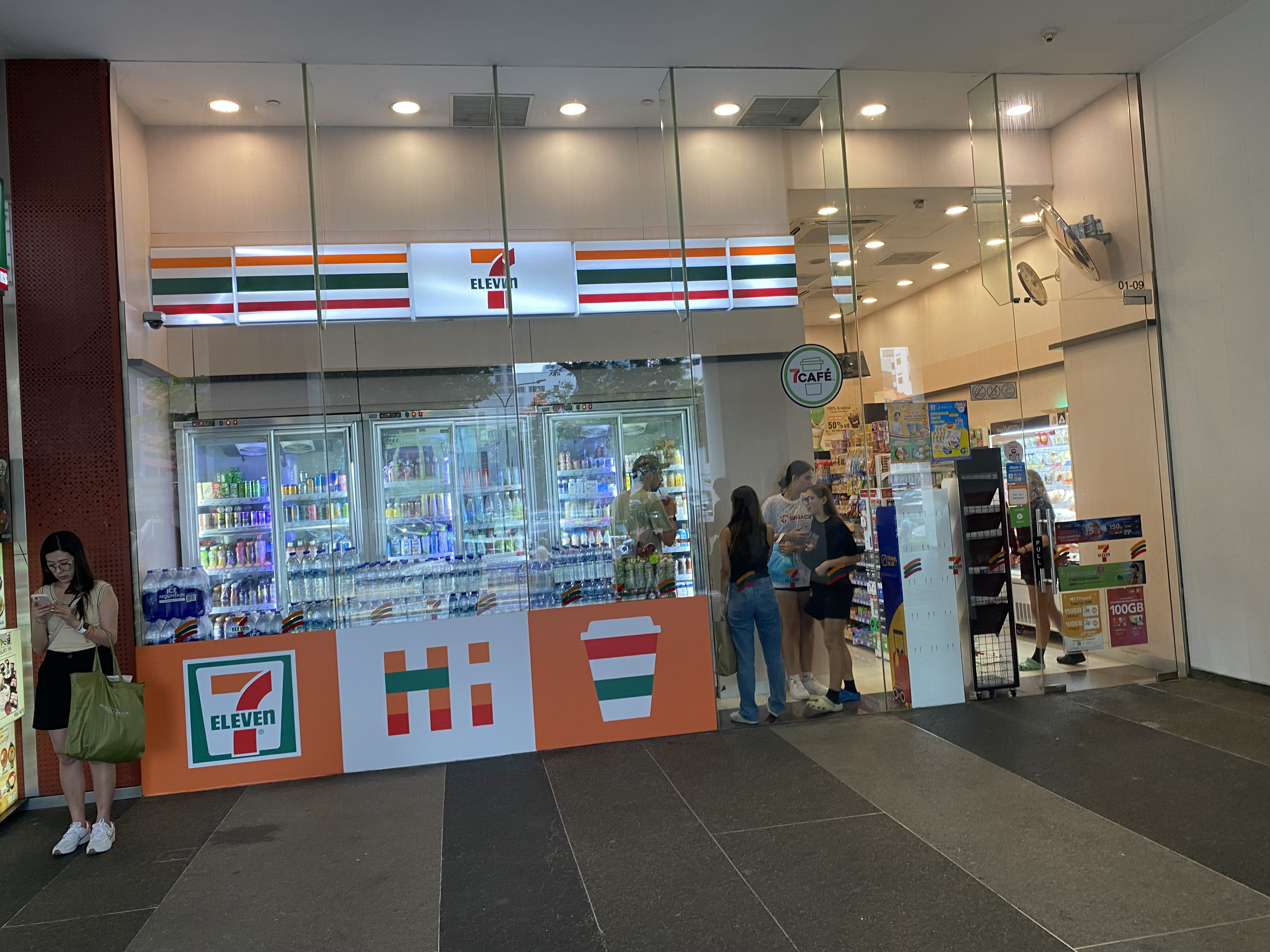
A 7-Eleven store in Bugis, Singapore

In Singapore, 7-Eleven forms the largest chain of convenience stores island-wide. There are 393 7-Eleven stores in the country as of February 2018. Stores in Singapore are operated by DFI Retail Group (formerly Dairy Farm International Holdings), franchised under a licensing agreement with 7-Eleven Incorporated. The first 7-Eleven store in Singapore was opened along Upper Changi Road in June 1983, and in 1986 the first franchised 7-Eleven store (under the Jardines) was opened. The license was then acquired by Cold Storage Singapore, a subsidiary of the Dairy Farm Group, in 1989.

In 2006, Shell Singapore and 7-Eleven agreed to rebrand all 68 of its Shell Select convenience stores into 7-Eleven. The partnership was terminated in October 2017, and the remaining 52 7-Eleven stores in Shell petrol stations were gradually rebranded back into Shell Select.

==== South Korea ====
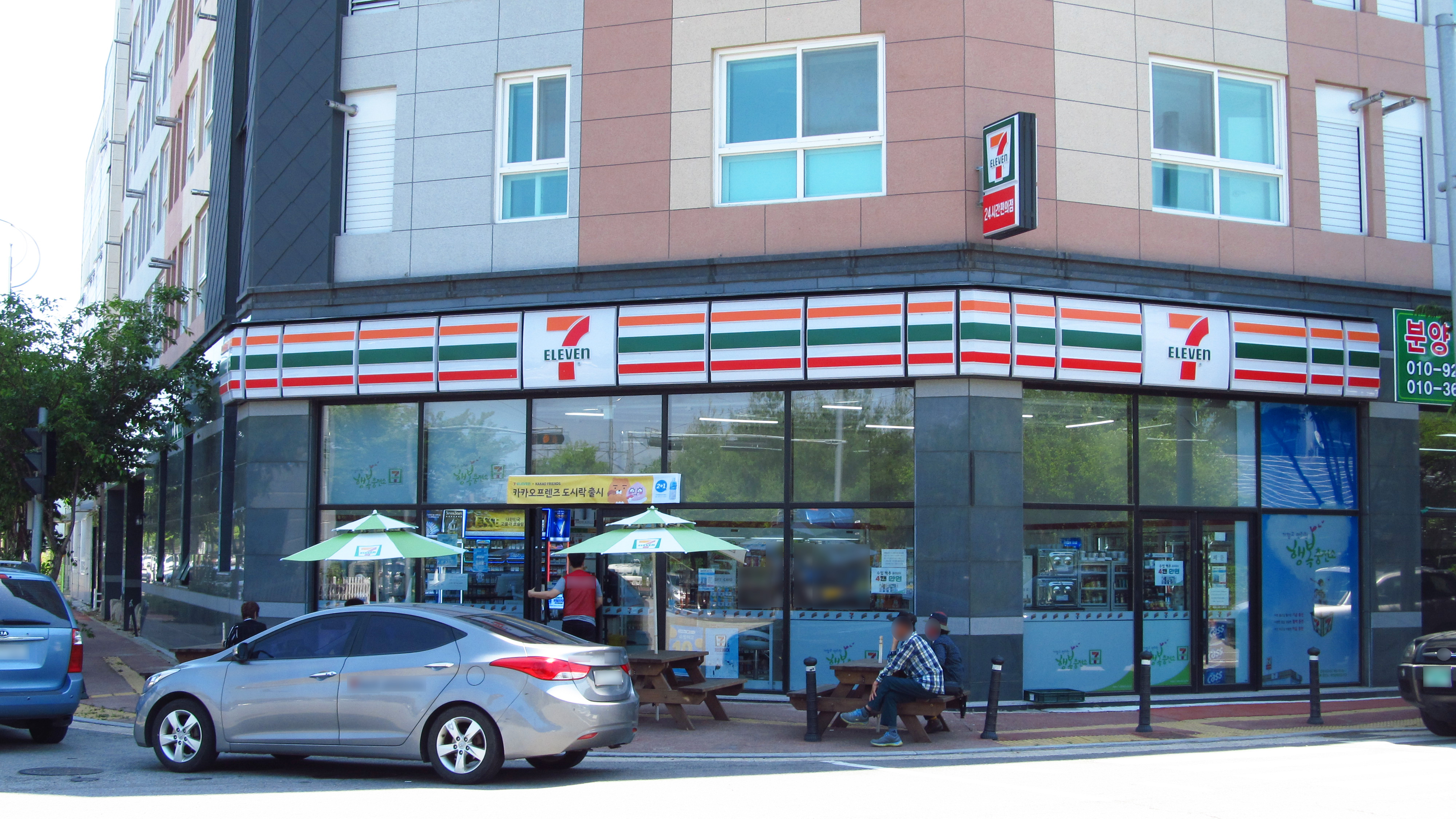
7-Eleven store in Gwangsan-gu, Gwangju, South Korea

7-Eleven has a major presence in the Republic of Korea convenience store market, where it competes with CU, GS25 (formerly LG25), and independent competitors. There are 11,067 7-Eleven stores in the Republic of Korea; with only Japan and Thailand hosting more stores. The first 7-Eleven store in the Republic of Korea opened in May 1989 in Songpa-gu in Seoul with a franchise license under the Lotte Group. In January 2010, Lotte Group acquired the Buy the Way convenience store chain and rebranded its 1,000 stores under the 7-Eleven brand.

In 2021, 7-Eleven announced that it would be working with a South Korean nonprofit to create jobs and franchising opportunities for North Korean defectors in South Korea.

In January 2022, Lotte acquired the entire stake of Ministop Korea Co. for 313.37 billion won ($263 million). After acquisition, all the Ministop store were gradually converted to 7-Eleven.

==== Taiwan ====
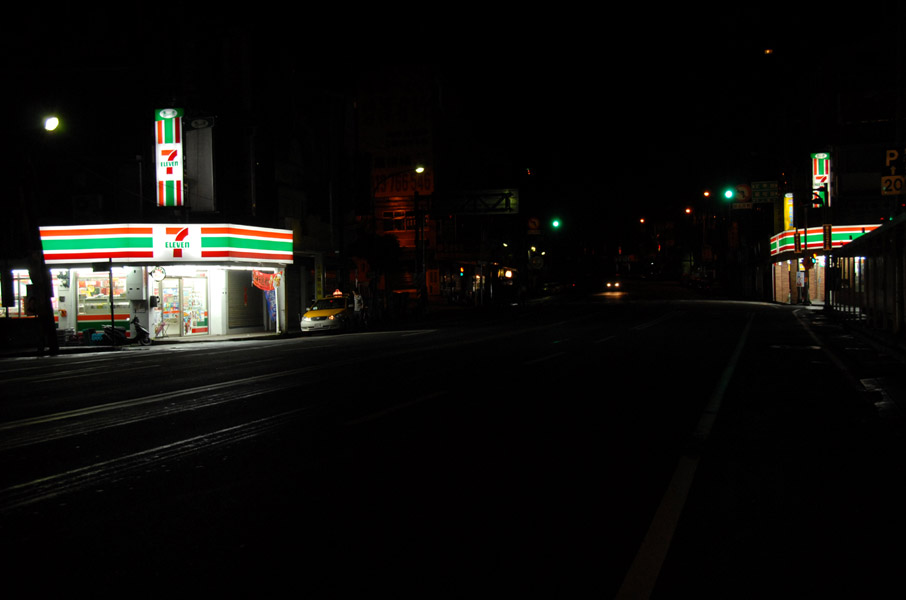
Two 7-Eleven stores near the same intersection in Xindian District, New Taipei City, Taiwan

7-Eleven is the largest convenience store chain in Taiwan, and is owned by President Chain Store Corporation (PCSC). The first fourteen stores opened in 1979, and struggled to make a profit. Southland Corporation partnered with Uni-President to modernize the stores. However, business was still slow, and Uni-President opted to stock Asian foods. In 1986, 7-Eleven made its first profit in Taiwan. The 5,000th store was opened in July 2014. In January 2018, an experimental and unstaffed shop branded the X-Store was opened. 7-Eleven announced plans to operate a combination store in partnership with Domino's Pizza in February 2019. The 6,000th store was opened on February 20, 2021. The 7,000th store was opened on July 5, 2024.

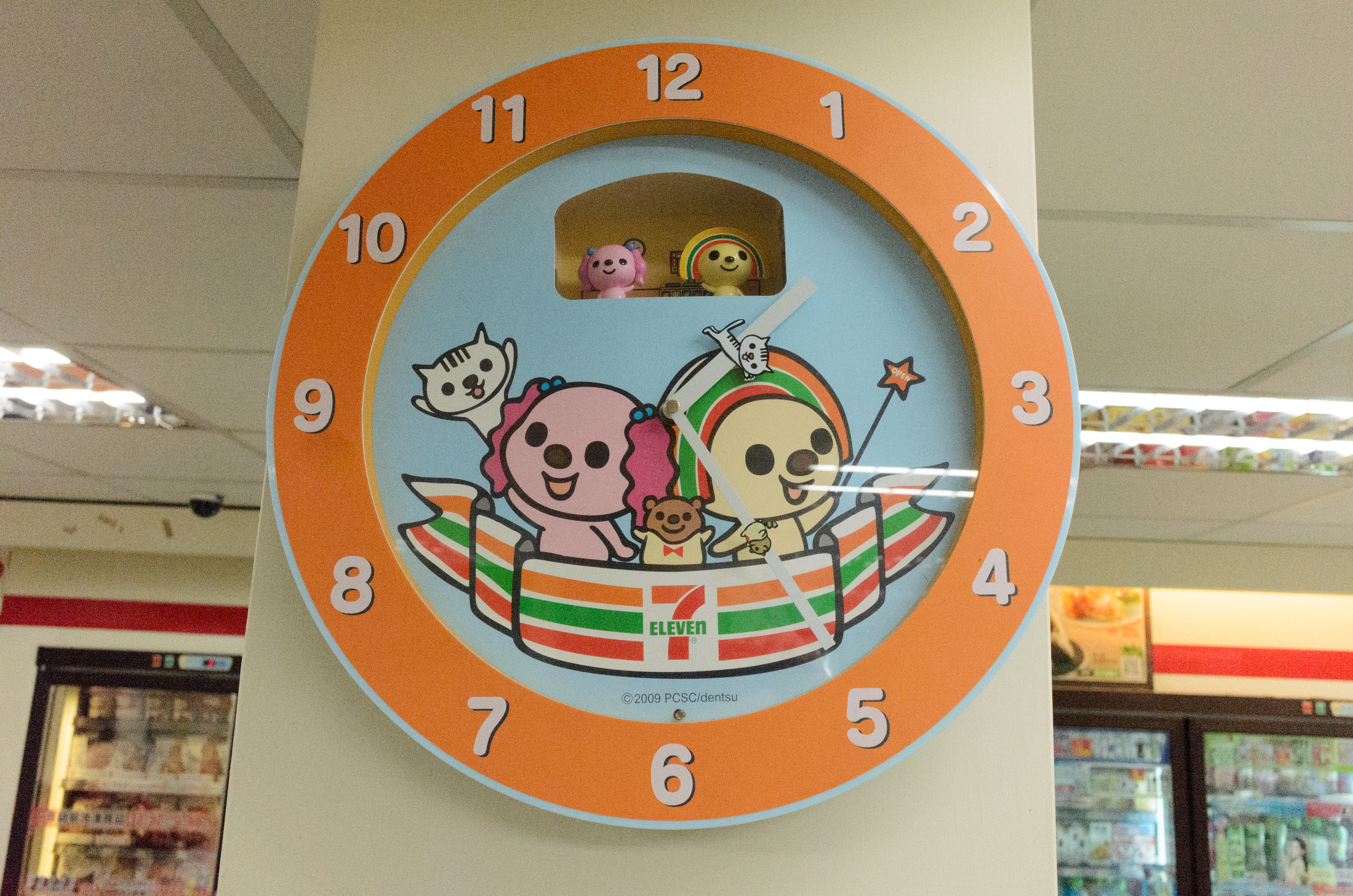
A Taiwanese 7-Eleven clock featuring cartoons of Open-Chan (right) and his friends (left)

In the early 2000s, 7-Eleven and Dentsu introduced a corporate mascot named Open-Chan (Open 小將), an extraterrestrial dog who wears a rainbow-shaped crown from a fictional planet known as Planet Open to be a "cartoon spokesperson" for the store chain in Taiwan. Open-Chan quickly grew in popularity among Taiwanese children soon after its initial debut. After Open-Chan's subsequent rise to prominence in Taiwan, the character was even introduced in Japan. The unique convenience store culture formed by President Chain Store (7-Eleven in Taiwan) has become a part of Taiwanese culture.

7-Eleven Taiwan also operates an MVNO called ibon mobile, which offers prepaid and postpaid SIM cards using the FarEasTone network.

==== Thailand ====
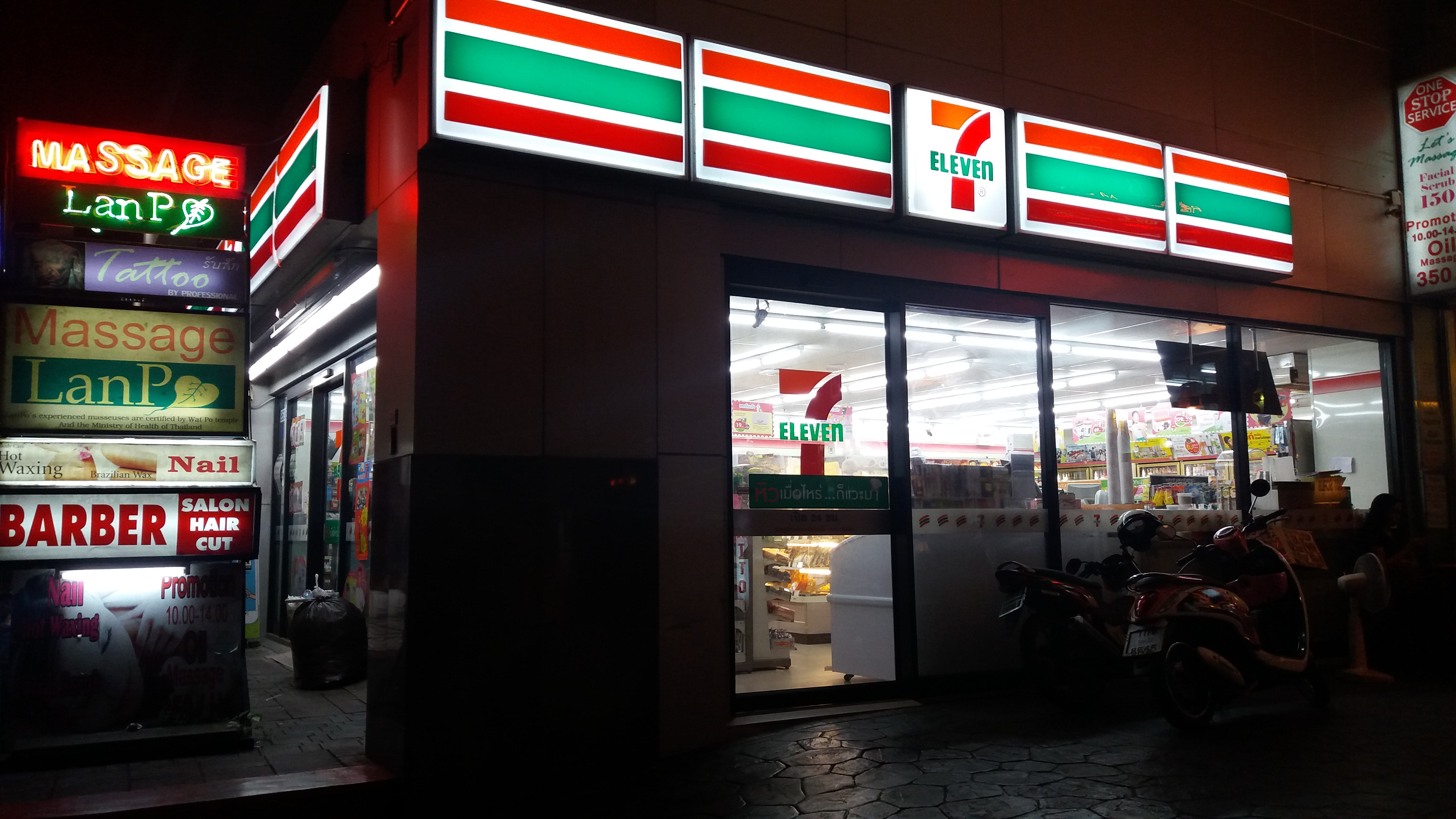
7-Eleven, Sukhumvit Soi 13, Bangkok, Thailand

The first Thai 7-Eleven opened on 1 June 1989 on Patpong Road in Bangkok. The chain consists of both company-owned (45%) and franchised shops (55%). CP All, a listed subsidiary of Charoen Pokphand, is the 7-Eleven owner and franchisor in Thailand; Charoen Pokphand received the franchise rights for Thailand in 1988. As of 2022, CP All has a total of 13,838 stores in Thailand, an increase from 12,432 in 2020. In 2018, 7-Eleven generated 335,532 million baht in income for CP. 7-Eleven holds a 70% market share in the convenience store category, opposed by some 7,000 other convenience stores (e.g., FamilyMart) and 400,000 "mom and pop" shops. Thailand has the second largest number of 7-Eleven stores after Japan.

In an effort to reduce plastic pollution the parent company of 7-Eleven stores in Thailand, CP All, announced their intent in November 2018 to reduce and eventually end the use of single-use plastic bags. As of January 2020, 7-Eleven—along with 42 other Thai retailers—will stop giving single-use plastic bags to customers. However, the use of plastic bags is still prevalent in many shops throughout the country, as are plastic straws.

==== United Arab Emirates ====
Seven & I Holdings announced in June 2014 that they had agreed a contract with Seven Emirates Investment LLC to open the first Middle Eastern 7-Eleven in Dubai, United Arab Emirates during the summer of 2015. The company also said that they had plans to open about 100 stores in the country by the end of 2017. The first store was opened in October 2015. The country has 13 stores as of January 2018, but as of the 2020s, 7-Eleven has shut down and is now absent in Dubai until further notice.

==== Vietnam ====
The first 7-Eleven store in Vietnam opened on June 15, 2017, making Vietnam the 17th country to host the world's largest convenience store chain. Seven System Vietnam (SSV) is the Master Franchisee of the 7-Eleven convenience store system in Vietnam, based in Ho Chi Minh City.

=== Australia ===
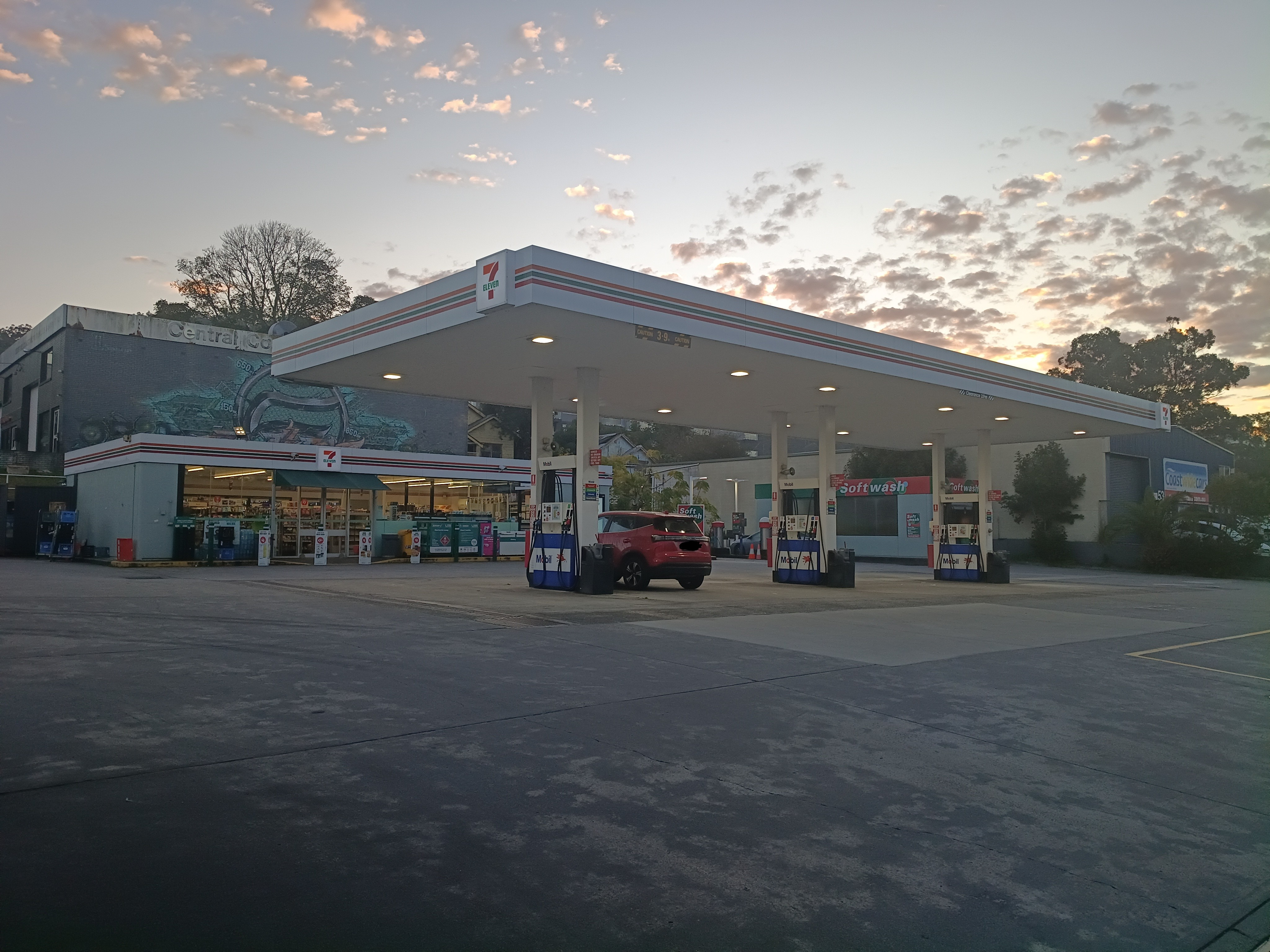
A 7-Eleven store with a Mobil-branded petrol station in Gosford, New South Wales

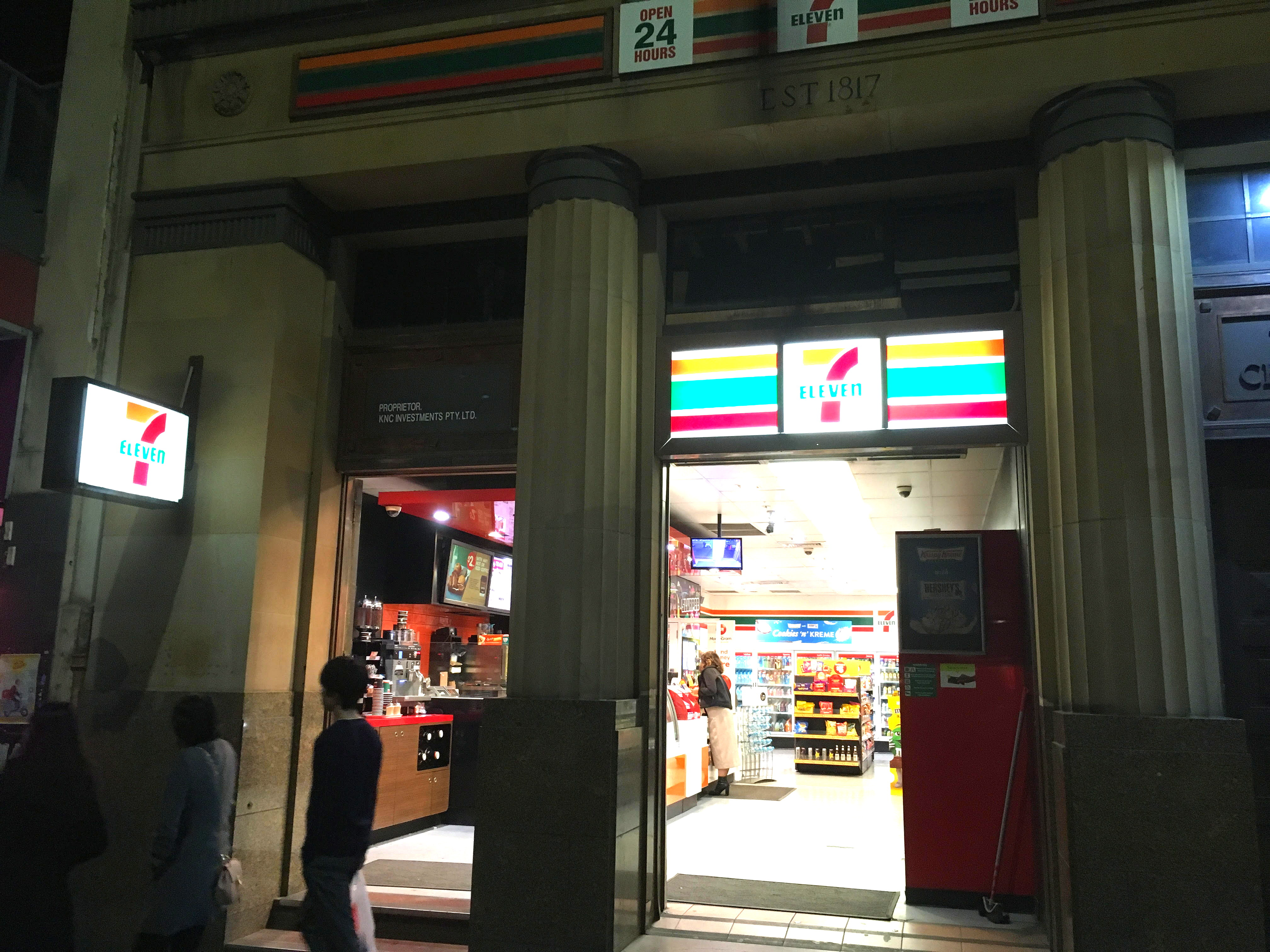
7-Eleven store in Melbourne, Victoria, Australia

The first 7-Eleven in Australia opened on 24 August 1977, in the Melbourne suburb of Oakleigh. The majority of stores are located in metropolitan areas, particularly in central business district areas. Stores in suburban areas often operate as petrol stations and most are owned and operated as franchises, with a central administration. 7-Eleven bought Mobil's remaining Australian petrol stations in 2010, converting them to 7-Eleven convenience store / petrol stations. In South Australia all Mobil petrol stations were later sold to Peregrine Corporation and rebranded to OTR convenience store / petrol stations.

In April 2014, 7-Eleven announced plans to start operating stores in Western Australia, with 11 stores planned to operate within the first year and a total of 75 stores established within five years. The first store was opened on October 30, 2014, in the city of Fremantle. The country has 675 stores as of January 2018.

In April 2022, 7-Eleven Australia settled a class-action lawsuit from its franchisees for A$98 million, amid claims that it had misled franchisees about the profitability of its business model.

In December 2023, Seven & I Holdings of Japan agreed to purchase the Australian 7-Eleven franchise from its original franchise owners for A$1.71 billion. The purchase was finalized in April 2024.

==== Class actions ====
In August 2015, Fairfax Media and the ABC's Four Corners program reported on the employment practices of certain 7-Eleven franchisees in Australia. The investigation found that many 7-Eleven employees were being underpaid at rates of around A$10 to A$14 per hour before tax, well under the legally required minimum award rate of A$24.69 per hour. The Four Corners investigation into 7-Eleven won a Walkley Award in 2015.

Franchisees underpaying their staff would typically maintain rosters and pay records that appeared to show the employee being paid the legally required rate; however, these records only included half of the hours the employee actually worked in a week. Employees were then paid on the basis of these records, resulting in them effectively being paid half the legally required rate. It was also reported that workers were often not paid loadings and penalty rates that they are legally entitled to, for working overtime hours, nights, weekends, and public holidays.

After these reports came to light and received widespread attention, some employees had alleged to Fairfax Media that they had begun to be paid correctly through the 7-Eleven payroll system; however, they were then asked by the franchisee to pay back half their wages in cash. 7-Eleven subsequently announced they would fund an inquiry to investigate instances of wage fraud. The inquiry was conducted by an independent panel chaired by former Australian Competition & Consumer Commission chairman Allan Fels, and with the support of professional services firm Deloitte.

In September 2015, chairman Russ Withers and chief executive Warren Wilmot announced they were resigning from the company. Deputy chairman Michael Smith replaced Withers, while Bob Baily was appointed as interim chief executive.

In December 2015, Stewart Levitt of law firm Levitt Robinson Solicitors, who featured prominently in the Four Corners program, announced a potential class action lawsuit against 7-Eleven head office on behalf of franchisees who had allegedly been lured into signing on with 7-Eleven by false representations. This announcement was made on the same day as a Court finding describing Levvit Robinson's "hellish bullying" of Dr Brendan French, miring the action in controversy. Also on that day, 7-Eleven offered to pay "the first $25 million of back-pay claims brought by current and former workers. Franchisees would then pay the next $5 million and any payments after that would be split 50-50 between head office and franchisees." Fels "described the $25 million offer from head office as a 'significant step forward'" but added that his panel's investigation would not be effected. 7-Eleven ultimately paid more than $173 million for "systematic wage theft" to workers employed between 2015 and 2020.

Levvit Robinson was forced to retract misleading statements made in advertising to 7-Eleven franchisees in June 2018 by the Federal Court of Australia. This occurred only months after Levvit Robinson launched a new class action against 7-Eleven that included the ANZ Bank despite banks having stopped loans to 7-Eleven franchisees in 2015. In a settlement approved by the Federal Court in 2022, 7-Eleven agreed to pay $98 million to franchisees alleging that they were misled regarding store profitability. Though the settlement was reached without any admission of fault, the case included allegations that 7-Eleven had misrepresented employee-related costs as about seven percent of total costs, when a more accurate figure was around thirteen percent. This difference made many franchisees "unable to make a profit unless they underpaid staff", as was shown in the wage theft class action.

=== Europe ===
==== Denmark ====
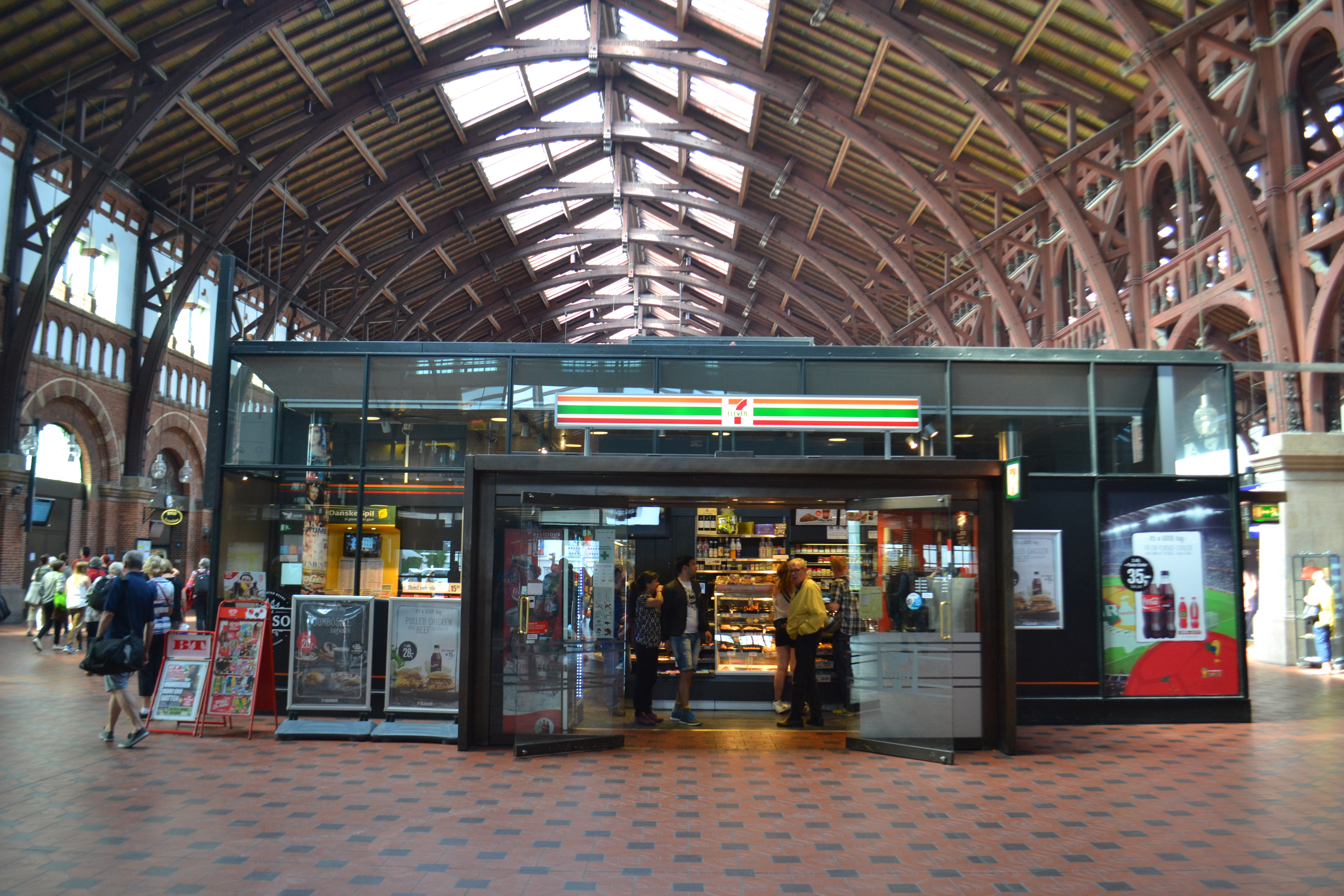
The 7-Eleven store with the highest turnover in the world, at Copenhagen Central Station, Denmark

The first 7-Eleven store in Denmark was opened at Østerbro in Copenhagen on September 14, 1993. There are 185 stores, mostly in Copenhagen, Aarhus, Aalborg, and Odense, including two stores at Copenhagen Central Station. In Denmark, 7-Eleven had an agreement with Shell, with a nationwide network of Shell/7-Eleven service stations. This ended in 2024 when the national franchise operator Reitan Danmark did not renew the agreement and instead used their own brand of service station Uno-X. 7-Eleven also have an agreement with the Danish railway company DSB to have 7-Eleven stores at most S-train stations and other train stations.

In 2022, 7-Eleven in Denmark suffered a widespread ransomware attack that caused all stores to temporarily close. 7-Eleven did not comply with the attacker's demands. No customer data was compromised in the attack.

The three biggest 7-Eleven stores in terms of revenue in the world, are all located in Denmark. The top two stores are both located at Copenhagen Central Station and the third are located at Copenhagen Airport beyond security.

==== Norway ====
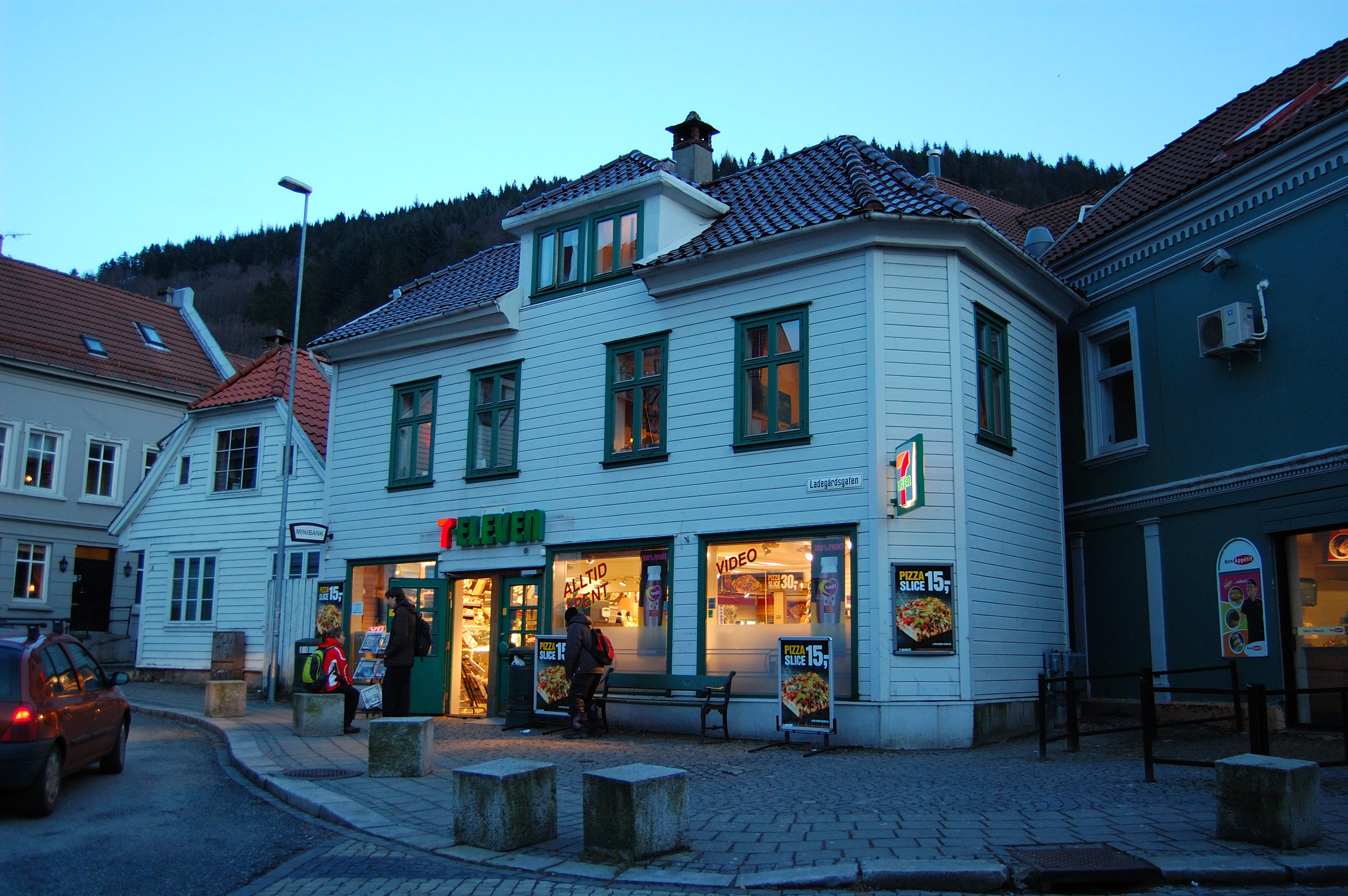
7-Eleven store in Bergen, Norway

7-Eleven has been established in Norway since 13 September 1986, when the first store opened in Oslo. In 2004, Reitan Convenience, a branch of the Norwegian Reitan Group bought the rights to use the 7-Eleven brand in Norway, Sweden and Denmark and since then has massively grown the number of operating shops in Scandinavia.

==== Sweden ====
7-Eleven entered Sweden in March 1984 with their first branch in Stockholm. Reitan acquired the brands right after 1997, and now has almost 200 stores throughout Sweden.

In May 2024, Reitan announced its intention to stop selling cigarettes in its Swedish stores, including all 7-Eleven Swedish stores, by 2026.

==== Turkey ====
7-Eleven entered the Turkish market in 1989. Major stakeholder of the master franchise, Özer Çiller sold his shares in 1993, after his wife Tansu Çiller became the Prime Minister. In the 2010s, 7-Eleven left the Turkish market, transferring most of its stores to franchise owners.

==== United Kingdom ====
During the 1980s, 7-Eleven convenience stores were based in London and the South East of England. The first shop opened in Hendon, north London in 1985. In October 1997 all 57 UK 7-Eleven stores were sold to Budgens. The company announced in 2014 they had planned to return to the UK market, but this did not progress beyond its announcement. In 2019, the company announced again it had planned to return, but as of October 2022 no stores had been opened.

=== North America ===
==== Canada ====
A 7-Eleven in Windsor, Ontario cobranded with Esso for gasoline sales.

The first 7-Eleven store to open in Canada was in Calgary, Alberta, on June 29, 1969. There are 562 7-Eleven stores in Canada as of December 2022. Winnipeg, Manitoba, has the world's largest number of Slurpee consumers, with an estimated 1,500,000 Slurpees sold since the first 7-Eleven opened on March 21, 1970. All 7-Eleven locations in Canada are corporate operated. Like its U.S. counterparts every July 11 the stores offer free Slurpees on "7-Eleven Day".

Many 7-Eleven locations offer petrol stations, either supplied by national distributors such as Imperial Oil and Petro-Canada, or under private label 7-Eleven branding. In March 2016, 7-Eleven acquired 148 Esso stations in Alberta and British Columbia from Imperial Oil for C$2.8 billion, with many of their convenience stores being converted to 7-Eleven. Some locations were not converted, and operate under the banner "smartstop 24/7" with their existing store formats, typically inherited from On the Run. In April 2025, 7-Eleven announced that it would convert its remaining 7-Eleven-branded petrol stations in Alberta and Ontario to either Esso, Mobil, or Petro-Canada.

In November 2005, 7-Eleven started offering the Speak Out Wireless cellphone service in Canada. 7-Eleven locations also featured CIBC ATMs—in June 2012, these machines were replaced with ATMs operated by Scotiabank. 7-Eleven abandoned the Ottawa, Ontario, market in December 2009 after selling its six outlets to Quickie Convenience Stores, a regional chain. Following concerns over the fate of 7-Eleven Speak Out Wireless customers, Quickie offered the option for SpeakOut customers to port into the Good2Go mobile provider. SpeakOut subsequently offered online sales as an option, and continues to offer Ottawa-based phone numbers to new and existing customers.

==== Mexico ====
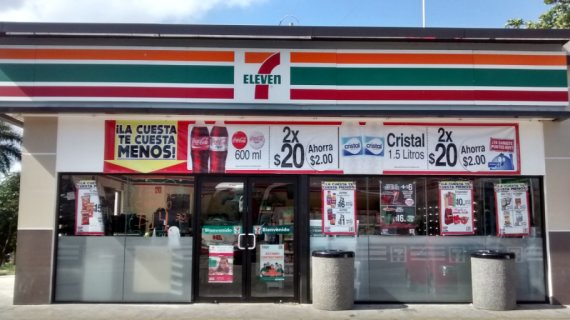
A 7-Eleven store in Cancún, Quintana Roo, Mexico

In Mexico, the first 7-Eleven store opened in 1976 in Monterrey in association with Grupo Chapa (now Iconn) and 7-Eleven, Inc. under the name Super 7. In 1995, Super 7 was renamed to 7-Eleven, which now has 1,835 stores in several areas of the country, making it the second-largest convenience store chain in the country, between Oxxo and Circle K. When stores are located within classically designed buildings (such as in Centro Histórico buildings) or important landmarks, the storefront logo is displayed in monochrome with gold or silver lettering.

==== United States ====
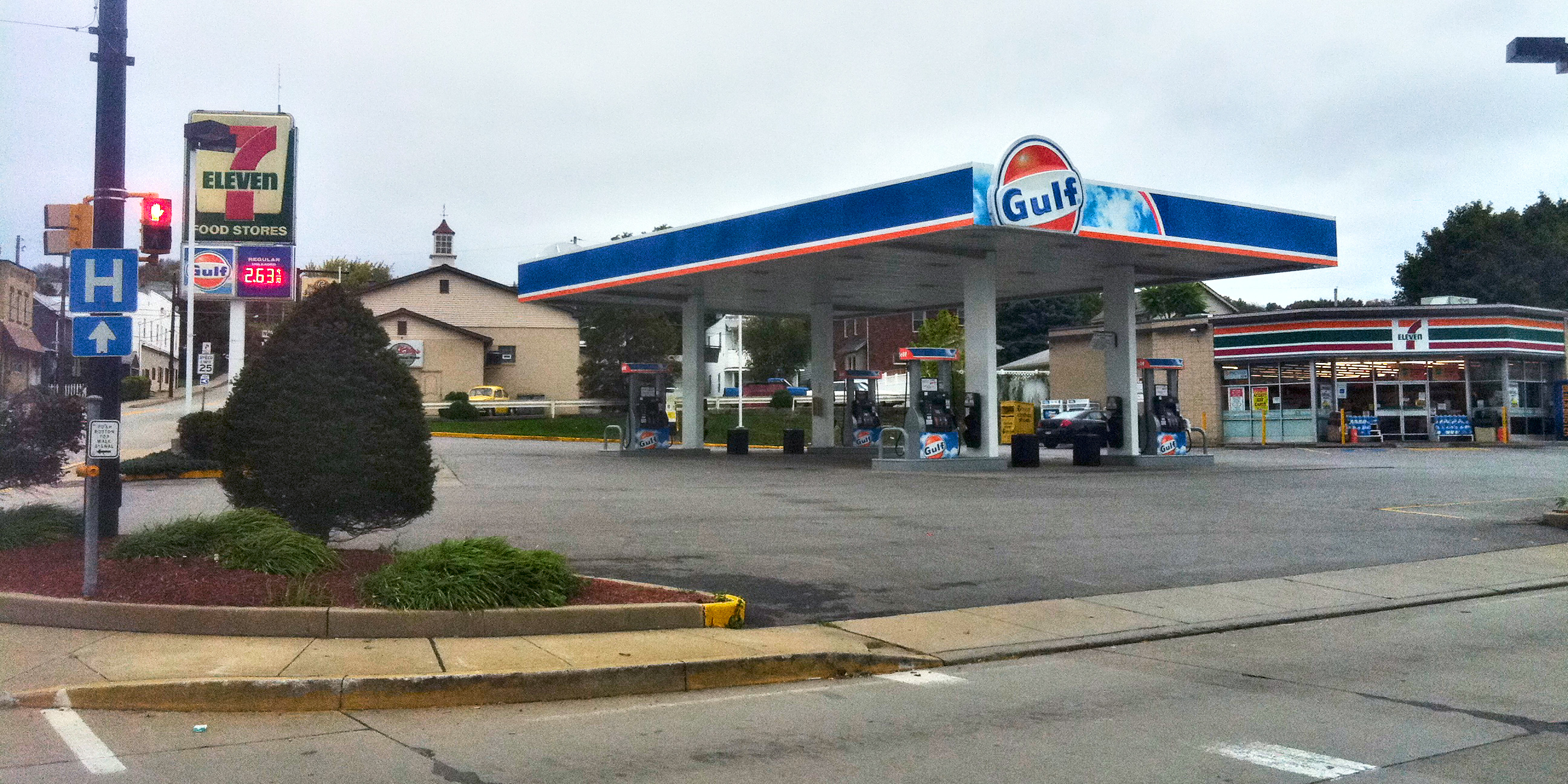
A 7-Eleven store cobranded with Gulf Oil for gasoline sales in Ellwood City, Pennsylvania, U.S. in 2010, having previously been a Citgo with the 7-Eleven. This store switched to Marathon for fuel sales in 2021 while remaining with 7-Eleven.

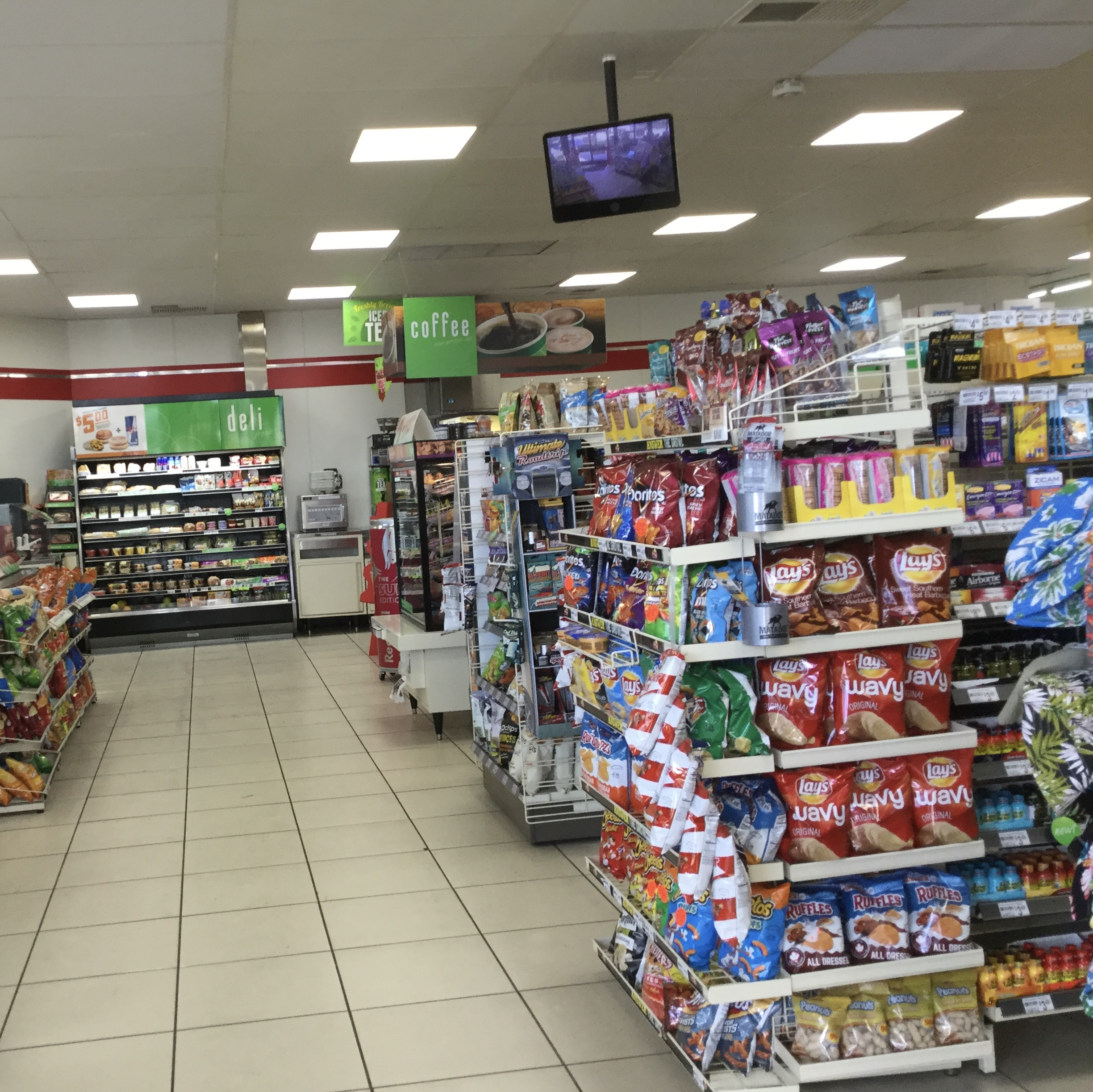
Interior of a 7-Eleven in Dover, Florida

Supermarket News ranked 7-Eleven's North American operations No. 11 in the 2007 "Top 75 North American Food Retailers", based on the 2006 fiscal year estimated sales of US$15.0 billion. Based on the 2005 revenue, 7-Eleven is the 24th largest retailer in the United States. As of 2013, 8,144 7-Eleven franchised units exist across the United States. Franchise fees range between US$10,000 – $1,000,000 and the ongoing royalty rate varies. 7-Eleven America has its headquarters in the Cypress Waters development in Irving, Texas. Small-size Slurpees are free on July 11, celebrated as "7-Eleven Day," except in 2020, when the COVID-19 pandemic caused that year's cancellation. 7 Rewards members got a free medium Slurpee in their app instead.

7-Eleven Stores of Oklahoma operated independently beginning in 1953 under an agreement with the Brown family. As part of this franchise agreement, 7-Elevens in Oklahoma bore slight differences to stores elsewhere: for instance, products such as Big Bite hot dogs were not sold there, the Slurpee was branded as the "Icy Drink", and Oklahoma stores operated their own loyalty program called "Thx!", which did not intersect with the national 7Rewards system. On March 2, 2020, 7-Eleven, Inc. announced it had officially closed on the acquisition of over 100 of these independently operated 7-Eleven stores in Oklahoma. All of these 100 stores were in the greater Oklahoma City metropolitan area. This acquisition increased the total number of 7-Eleven stores in the US and Canada to nearly 9800. Following the purchase, the Oklahoma 7-Elevens were fully integrated into national branding, marketing, and loyalty campaigns.

In April 2021, 7-Eleven launched the "Take it to Eleven" ad campaign. The slogan was partially inspired by the chain's name, but also the term "up to eleven" made popular in the 1984 comedy film This is Spinal Tap. The slogan was only for the main 7-Eleven brand and not A-Plus or Stripes.

By summer 2021, the company had installed just a few electric vehicle charging stations, but announced plans to expand considerably, with a target of 250 DC fast-charging locations in the U.S. and Canada by the end of 2022, starting with four states (California, Colorado, Florida and Texas). Less than two years later, in mid-March 2023, 7-Eleven announced plans for 7Charge, "its new, proprietary EV charging network and app", promoting the Android and iOS mobile apps, which allow users to find 7-Eleven - and future Speedway and Stripes - charger locations and pay for charging. 7Charge locations offer CCS and CHAdeMO charging; Tesla drivers, and other vehicles using the (once-proprietary) NACS connector, can also charge, but require a user-supplied CCS adapter.

In August 2022, 7-Eleven acquired Skipcart, a same-day and on-demand delivery platform.

In early 2024, parent company Seven & i Holdings' CEO Ryuichi Isaka announced changes to the business model of US stores, placing the company's focus on fresh foods instead of a "[reliance] on gasoline and cigarettes". The company is working with food supplier Warabeya Nichiyo, which already supplies 7-Eleven's commissary food offerings in Japan, to create a US supply chain that will bring higher-quality Western and Japanese food offerings to 7-Eleven stores. Isaka also announced 7-Eleven's plan to grow its footprint and consolidate a larger portion of the US convenience store market. The company announced plans to add hot and cold food options and a larger baked goods selection at up to 1,600 Speedway and Stripes stores.

Fuel
In the U.S., many 7-Eleven filling stations had gasoline distributed by Citgo, which in 1983 were purchased by Southland Corporation. 50% of Citgo was sold in 1986 to Petróleos de Venezuela, S.A., and the remaining 50% was acquired in 1990. Although Citgo was the predominant partner of 7-Eleven, other oil companies are also co-branded with 7-Eleven, including Fina, Exxon, Mobil, Gulf, Marathon, BP, Amoco, Phillips 66, Conoco, 76, Shell, Chevron (some former TETCO convenience stores were co-branded with Chevron, and Texaco prior to the 7-Eleven purchase in late 2012), Sunoco, and Sinclair. Conoco is the largest 7-Eleven licensee in North America. The Pittsburgh market alone—where 7-Eleven is the market leader by store count but third behind Sheetz and GetGo in revenue— offers fuel from Exxon, Gulf, Marathon (both legacy 7-Eleven locations and Speedway), BP, and Sunoco (the latter two being from 7-Eleven's acquisitions of their company-owned-and-operated locations in the area) and also having previously offered Citgo and Pennzoil at some locations. In more recent years, some 7-Eleven locations sell 7-Eleven branded fuel without a Big Oil brand, much like 7-Eleven's primary rival Circle K has done in recent years.

7-Eleven signed an agreement with Exxon-Mobil in December 2010 for the acquisition of 183 sites in Florida. This was followed by the acquisition of 51 ExxonMobil sites in North Texas in August 2011.

Regardless of fuel brand, 7-Eleven has its own fleet network, 7 Fleet, for business customers and truck drivers at locations large enough to feature dedicated fueling lanes for semi trucks, though 7 Fleet can also be used at standard 7-Eleven locations as well. It is mostly designed to compete with Pilot Flying J's One9 Network designed for owner-operator drivers, as well as drivers that go to standard Pilot Flying J, Love's Travel Stops & Country Stores, and TravelCenters of America locations.

On August 2, 2020, Seven & i Holdings announced the buyout of Speedway LLC for $21 billion. The deal closed on May 14, 2021. 7-Eleven was ordered by U.S. antitrust regulators to divest 293 stores across 20 states. 124 stores were sold to Anabi Oil, 106 stores were sold to Cross-America Partners LP and 63 stores were sold to Jacksons Food Stores. 7-Eleven also dropped Speedway's participation in Pilot Flying J's One9 Network in favor of 7 Fleet.

=== South America ===
==== Brazil ====
In Brazil, during the 1990s, 7-Eleven had 17 stores in the city of São Paulo in a joint venture between Esteve S.A. Exportadora and Southland Corporation, but all closed due to high competition. In 2018, the company entered into partnership talks to operate convenience stores at gas stations operated by Petrobras Distribuidora in the country, but these did not progress further.

== Legal issues ==
=== Trademark lawsuit against Nike ===
In July 2026, 7-Eleven filed a trademark infringement lawsuit against Nike, Inc. in the United States District Court for the Northern District of Texas, seeking to block the release of a new Nike Air Max 95 "Big Bubble" sneaker. The complaint alleged that the shoe's colorway imitated, in a "confusingly similar" manner, the orange, green, and red color combination of the 7-Eleven logo, which the company has used commercially since the 1980s and for which it holds multiple federal trademark registrations.

7-Eleven argued that the design could mislead consumers into believing that Nike had a partnership or collaboration with the company, noting that some product listings and media outlets had referred to the sneaker as the "7-Eleven" shoe or described it as "7-Eleven-inspired". The complaint also pointed to the shoe's planned release date of July 11, which coincides with the company's annual "7-Eleven Day" promotion, as evidence of deliberate association. 7-Eleven asked the court for a permanent injunction barring the sale and promotion of the shoe, a recall and destruction of existing inventory, disgorgement of profits, and damages. According to federal court records, Nike was served with the complaint on July 6, 2026; a hearing date had not yet been scheduled.

== See also ==
- List of convenience stores
- UtoteM
- R-kioski
