= Will Radcliff =

American businessman (1939–2014)

- Born: Willard Lawson Radcliff; December 20, 1939; Dayton, Kentucky, U.S.
- Died: September 18, 2014 (aged 74); Cincinnati, Ohio, U.S.
- Education: Western Hills High School
- Occupation: Businessman
- Known for: Founder of Slush Puppie
- Children: 2

Willard Lawson Radcliff (December 20, 1939 – September 18, 2014) was an American businessman who created the Slush Puppie, a frozen slush drink. He also founded Slush Puppie Corp. in 1970, which grew to $25 million in worldwide annual sales by 1999. In 2000, Radcliff sold Slush Puppie to Cadbury Schweppes for $16.6 million. Slush Puppie was acquired by J & J Snack Foods in 2006.

== Life and career ==
Radcliff was born on December 20, 1939, in Dayton, Kentucky, and raised in Cincinnati, Ohio. He graduated from Cincinnati's Western Hills High School in 1958. Prior to founding Slush Puppie, Radcliff held jobs as a shoe shiner at a country club, a vacuum cleaner salesman and a peanut seller.

As the Slush Puppie Corp. expanded, Radcliff added additional products, including Thelma's frozen lemonade, Pacific Bay Smooth-E, and Lanikai Frozen Cocktail.

In the 1980s, Radcliff became interested in land surrounding Umatilla, Florida, while visiting friends in the 1980s. He acquired approximately 3,594 acres of wilderness and pasture land when "was nothing there but lots of cattle," according to his daughter, DeeAnn Radcliff Harmon. Radcliff regularly flew in a private plane between his home in Ohio and his ranch in Central Florida. He called it Radcliff's Fly'n R Ranch, located in Lake and Marion counties. He built a 19,990-square-foot barn complete with a lumber mill, to saw the wooden boards used to construct his ranch house.

Radcliff became seriously interested in land conservation following the sale of Slush Puppie for $16.6 million in 2000. Much of the Floridian land which Radlciff owned had been drained for cattle ranching or pasture land. Radcliff oversaw the restoration of much of the land to a more natural state and completed most of the work himself. He dredged his marshes to restore area lakes, which created habitat for ospreys, waterfowl and wading birds.

Under an agreement, 3,106 acres of his ranch was passed to the state-owned St. Johns River Water Management District upon his death in 2014. Negotiations between Radcliff and St. Johns River Water Management District officials took years to complete. A provision allowing Radcliff to remain on the ranch led to a final agreement, in which Radlciff received $5.2 million for the future rights to his land. The 3,105 acres will be turned into a Florida state-owned water and wildlife sanctuary. Water Management District see Radcliff's ranch as a key corridor connecting the Ocala National Forest, Lake Griffin State Park, and the Ocklawaha River. The remaining 500 acres of his ranch, including his home, will remain the property of his estate, with an easement to prohibit the development of the land.

Will Radcliff died in Cincinnati, Ohio, from complications of a fall on September 18, 2014, at the age of 74. He was survived by his daughter, DeeAnn Radcliff Harmon; son, Chris Radcliff; his brother; and four grandchildren.
