= Thirst Buster =

Thirst Buster may refer to:

- Thirst Buster (Shell Canada), a slushy beverage sold by Shell Canada
- Thirst Buster, a former brand of fountain drinks sold at Circle K (renamed to Polar Pop in 2007)
