= Sloche =

Sloche is a frozen beverage sold by the convenience store chain Couche-Tard, mostly in the province of Quebec, Canada. While it is similar in concept to the Froster beverage sold by Couche-Tard's banners outside of Quebec (including Circle K), Sloche has gathered much publicity through an aggressive (and sometimes controversial) marketing campaign. The oversized Sloche plastic cups are covered with humorous slogans such as: "No animal has tasted this product before you," and "A good source of crushed ice." Couche-Tard also used to sell gummy candies under the Sloche brand. Some of these candies had to be removed from the shelves after allegations that their concept art was racist.

== Flavors ==
All Sloche flavor names are humorous and often gross, a marketing angle aimed at pleasing a mostly adolescent crowd. The brand mission was described as: "To satisfy their need for sensory gratification and protest against authority, parents and society." The beverage's colors are vivid and the taste is said to be much sweeter than that of Slush Puppie and slightly more acidic. The following is an incomplete list of current and discontinued flavors:

- Winchire Wacheur (2000) (Windshield Washer), formerly: Schtroumpf Écrasé (Crushed Smurf) renamed because of concerns over copyright infringement. Actual flavor is blue raspberry.
- Sang Froid (2000) (Cold Blood) Actual flavor is cherry.
- Goudron Sauvage (2001) (Wild Tar) Actual flavor is lemonade.
- Poussin Frappé (2002) (Chick Shake) Actual flavor is berry.
- Rosebeef (2003) (Rosbeef) Actual flavor is peach.
- Swompe (2004) (Swamp) Actual flavor was strawberry-kiwi, but it was changed to green apple.
- Cheddar Tropical (2005) (Tropical Cheddar) Actual flavor is sour apple.
- Liposuccion (2006) (Liposuction) Actual flavor is passionfruit.
- Gadoue (2007) (Dirty half-melted snow) Actual flavor is wild berry.
- Wontong (2008) (Wonton Soup) Actual flavor is iced tea.
- Sloche 10è anniversaire (2009) (10th Anniversary Sloche) Actual flavor is sour apple.
- Paparmane (2010) (Peppermint) Actual flavor is grape.
- Crème à barbe (2012) (Shaving cream) Actual flavor is creamy orange.
- Ouananiche (2013) (Landlocked salmon) This was actually a fake shown on April Fools' Day.
- Pizzaghetti (2013) Actual flavor of the "Pizza" half is strawberry, and the "Ghetti" half is kiwi.
- Savon (2014) (Soap) Actual flavor is watermelon.

Bomme Galoune and Full Zinzin flavours only seem to appear in old marketing material. Full Zinzin also briefly appears in the televised commercial made for the Goudron Sauvage flavour. However, these flavours are never mentioned in any more recent articles or marketing retrospectives.

== See also ==
- Slush (beverage)
