= J'un Oeil =

Studio album by Sloche
- Released: 1975
- Genres: Progressive rock, jazz fusion
- Length: 37:34
- Label: RCA

Sloche chronology
J'un Oeil (1975)	Stadaconé (1976)

J'un Oeil is the title of a 1975 album by Canadian jazz fusion band Sloche. Highly regarded by prog fanatics as one of the top albums from Quebec, Canada in the 1970s alongside Les cinq saisons by Harmonium, and Les Porches by Maneige.

== Track listing ==
1. "C'pas la fin du Monde" – 8:45
2. "Le Karême d'Eros" – 10:40
3. "J'un Oeil" – 4:41
4. "Algébrique" – 6:23
5. "Potage Aux Herbes Douteuses" – 7:05

== Personnel ==
- Réjean Yacola - Acoustic and Electric Pianos, Minimoog, Clavinet, Celesta, Vocals
- Martin Murray - Hammond B3 Organ, Minimoog, Saxophone, Vocals
- Caroll Bérard - Acoustic and Electric Guitars, Vocals
- Pierre Hébert - Bass, Vocals
- Gilles Chiasson - drums
