= Pumpable ice technology =

Type of technology to produce and use fluids or secondary refrigerants

Pumpable ice passed through plastic tubes

Pumpable ice technology (PIT) uses thin liquids, with the cooling capacity of ice. Pumpable ice is typically a slurry of ice crystals or particles ranging from 5 micrometers to 1 cm in diameter and transported in brine, seawater, food liquid, or gas bubbles of air, ozone, or carbon dioxide.

== Terminology ==
Beyond generic terms, such as pumpable, jelly, or slurry ice, there are many trademark names for such coolant, like "Deepchill", "Beluga", "optim", "flow", "fluid", "jel", "binary", "liquid", "maxim", "whipped", and "bubble slurry" ice. These trademarks are authorized by industrial ice maker production companies in Australia, Canada, China, Germany, Iceland, Israel, Russia, Spain, United Kingdom, and the US.

== Technological process ==
Pumpable ice can be produced in one of two ways: either by mixing crushed ice with a liquid or by freezing water within a liquid.

- The primary way is to manufacture commonly used forms of crystal solid ice, such as plate, tube, shell or flake ice, by crushing and mixing it with water. This mixture of different ice concentrations and particle dimensions (ice crystals can vary in length from 200 μm to 10 mm) is passed by pumps from a storage tank to the consumer. The constructions, specifications and applications of current conventional ice makers are described in this reference:
- The secondary way is to create the crystallization process inside the volume of the cooled liquid. This crystallization inside can be accomplished using vacuum or cooling technologies. In vacuum technology, very low pressure forces a small part of the water to evaporate while the remaining water freezes, forming a water-ice mixture. Depending on the additive concentrations, the final temperature of pumpable ice is −4–0 °C (25–32 °F). The large volume of vapor and an operating pressure of about 6 mbar (600 Pa) require the use of a water vapor compressor with a great swept volume. This technology is economically reasonable and can be recommended for systems with a cooling capacity of 1 MW (300 ton of refrigeration; 3.5 million BTU/h) or larger.

Crystallization by cooling can be done using direct or indirect systems.

=== Direct pumpable ice technology ===
In direct methods, a refrigerant is directly injected inside the liquid. The advantage of this method is the absence of any intermediate device between the refrigerant and the liquid. However, the absence of heat loss between refrigerant and liquid in the process of thermal interaction (heat transfer) may cause problems. The safety measures that have to be implemented, the need for the additional step of refrigerant separation, and difficulties in producing crystals are further disadvantages of this method.

=== Indirect pumpable ice technology ===
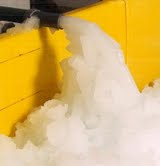
Pumpable ice of high concentration

In indirect methods, the evaporator (heat exchanger-crystallizer) is assembled horizontally or vertically. It has a shell tubing assembled with one to a hundred inner tubes and containing a refrigerant that evaporates between the shell and the internal tubing. Liquid flows through the tubing of a small diameter. In the inside volume of the evaporator, cooling, super cooling, and freezing of the liquid take place due to heat exchange with the crystallizer-cooled wall.

The idea is to use a well-polished evaporator surface (dynamic scraped surface heat exchanger) and appropriate mechanisms to prevent tubing from adhering to the ice embryos, and to prevent growth and a thickening of the ice on the inside cooling surface. A whip rod, screw, or shaft with metallic or plastic wipers is usually used as a mechanism for removal.

Indirect pumpable ice technologies produce pumpable ice consisting of 5 to 50 micrometer crystals and have a number of advantages: they can produce 1,000 kg of crystal ice at the low energy expenditure of 60 to 75 kWh instead of the 90 to 130 kWh required to produce regular water ice (plate, flake, shell types). Further improvements are expected to lead to a specific energy expenditure for ice production of 40 to 5 5kWh per 1,000 kg of pure ice and a high specific ice capacity per an area value at the evaporator cooling surface (up to 450 kg/(m^{2}·h)).

Commercial evaporators of the double-pipe type used in the food and fish industries have an inside diameter of interior tube and length in a range of 50–125 mm and 60–300 cm. For the dewaxing lubrication oil, evaporators are widely used with the following dimensions: internal diameter of the inner tube is 150–300 mm; the length is 600–1,200 cm.

Sometimes a gas can be added to the liquid flowing through the evaporator. It destroys the liquid laminar layer on the cooled surface of the heat exchanger-crystallizer, increases flow turbulence, and decreases the average viscosity of the pumpable ice.

Different liquids, such as sea water, juice, brines, or glycol solutions of additives with more than 3–5% concentrations and a freezing point less than −2 °C are used in the process.

Typically, the equipment for the production, accumulation and supplying of pumpable ice includes an ice maker, a storage tank, a heat exchanger, piping, pumps, and electrical and electronic appliances and devices.

Pumpable ice with maximum ice concentration of 40% can be pumped straight from the ice maker to the consumer. The final possible ice concentration of pumpable ice in the storage tank is 50%. The maximum value of cooling energy of pumpable ice accumulated in the storage tank in a homogeneous phase is about 700 kWh, which corresponds to 10–15 m^{3} volume of a storage tank. A high-shear mixer is used to prevent the separation of ice from the cooled liquid and keeps the ice concentration unchanged over time and unaffected by the tank height. Pumpable ice is transported from the storage tank to a place of consumption that could be hundreds of meters away. The practical ratio between the required electric power of the submersible mixer motor (kW) and the "kneaded" pumpable ice volume (m^{3}) is 1:1.

In the tanks with volumes larger than 15 m^{3}, pumpable ice is not mixed and the cold energy of stored ice is only used by a heat transfer of liquid that circulates between a storage tank and the consumers of cold. The disadvantages of existing ice storage reservoirs include the following:

The chaotic uncontrollable upsurge of ice ridges which arise due to uneven sprinkling of warm fluid. This liquid is fed into the storage tank from the heat exchanger for further cooling by direct contact with the surface of the ice. The solution is sprayed unevenly in space. Moreover, the rate of supply is not constant. Therefore, the ice melts unevenly. Thus, the ice spikes rise above the ice surface, which leads to the destruction of the spraying devices. In this case, it is necessary to reduce the level of solution in the storage tank to avoid breakage of spray devices.

Ice accumulated in the tank turns into a large chunk. The warm liquid that comes from the air-conditioning system may generate channels through which the liquid could return to the system without being cooled. As a result, the accumulated ice is not fully utilized.

Ineffective use of the volume of the accumulation tank leads to a decrease in the achievable maximum of ice concentration and an inability to fill the entire working volume of the storage tank.

Research and development on overcoming these disadvantages is underway and is expected to lead to the mass production of cheap, reliable and efficient accumulating tanks. These tanks should ensure higher ice concentrations and allow full use of stored cold potential.

== Applications ==
Many ice maker producers, research centers, and inventors are working on pumpable ice technologies. Due to their high energy efficiency, reduced size, and low refrigerant charges, there are many applications for this technology.

=== Selection ===
There are different pumpable ice maker designs and many special areas of application. The choice is facilitated by computer programs developed by manufacturers.

A customer who intends to use pumpable ice technology should know:

- Required maximum/minimum cooling capacity (TR)
- Profile of energy consumption (TR•h) of the plant over 24h, one week, one season, and one year
- Temperature ranges of the products to be refrigerated (water, juice, liquid, food, and fish)
- Temperature conditions of the climate at the location of the customer
- Design limitations on equipment placement
- Characteristics of the power supply system
- Intentions and plans of future expansion

When designing storage tanks, several features are to be taken into account:

- Target of usage of PIT system: Applying pumpable ice for direct contact with a refrigerated product requires the installation of storage tanks with a mixer. To prevail over the tendency of ice to freeze in an iceberg form and to pump ice through the pipes over a distance of 100 m to 200 m, continuous mixing must be used. For pumpable ice applications in thermal energy storage systems, mixing is not needed.
- Available space: To determine the type of construction (vertical or horizontal ) and the number of storage tanks, site dimensions and permissible heights must be considered.
- Required daily and weekly stored energy: The cost of the storage tanks is a significant factor in the total cost of a pumpable ice system. Typically, storage tanks are designed with a stored energy value 10–20% higher than that required for production. Furthermore, it has to be remembered that 100% ice concentration in the tank is impossible.

The thickness of the wall of the evaporators is usually determined to ensure:

- High sustainable heat transfer flux during the process
- Tensile strength of the inside pipe adequate to withstand the external pressure
- Tensile strength of the outside pipe adequate to withstand internal pressure
- Enough room for corrosion
- Availability of spare parts

Evaporators are usually cheaper when they have a smaller shell diameter and a long pipe length. Thus, the evaporator of pumpable ice makers is typically as long as physically possible whilst not exceeding production capabilities. However, there are many limitations, including the space available at the customer site where the pumpable ice maker is going to be used.

=== Maintenance and service ===
A pumpable ice maker has predictive maintenance and cleaning requirements. Operational conditions of the specific equipment determine the service intervals and types of service.

Proper refrigeration maintenance of a pumpable ice maker will extend its life, and routine maintenance can reduce the probability of an emergency service caused by major component failure, such as of a refrigeration compressor or the fan motor of the air condenser due to a dirty coil, and refrigerant leakage.

Possible problems caused by not maintaining the air-cooled pumpable ice maker are:

- Failure of fan motors caused by dirty coils restricting air flow
- Failure of the thermostat caused by high amp draw due to dirty condenser coils
- Failure of refrigeration compressor caused by dirty condenser coil and excessive head pressure
- Restriction of capillary tubing (metering device) caused by refrigerant oil overheating and fouling
- Wiring burning and failure due to excessive amperage caused by high head pressure and dirty condenser coils
- Increased electrical consumption due to longer-run times caused by dirty condenser coils
- Pollution and blockage of the line of condensate water.

In the pumpable ice maker liquid treatment is used to remove particles down to 1 μm in size and to minimize fouling of the heat transfer surface of the evaporators. Plate heat exchangers also need to be disassembled and cleaned periodically. Properly treating liquid before it enters the pumpable ice maker or the Plate heat exchanger will help to limit the amount of scale build-up, thus reducing cleaning times and preventative maintenance costs. Improperly sizing the liquid filter system leads to costly early change outs and poor performance.

=== Wastewater treatment ===
Pumpable ice technologies can be recommended for cleaning (lightening) sediments in waste waters. In this case, a method including freezing and further melting with subsequent separation of the liquid and solid phases is used. This method leads to a variation in the physical-chemical structure of sediments and is realized owing to redistribution of any form of the connection of moisture with solid particles of the sediment. It does not need any chemical reagent. The sediment's freezing promotes an increase in the free water quantity of the sediment and improves the efficiency of sediment precipitation. Most of the moisture is capable of diffusion at any of the conditions. Therefore, if the velocity of crystal growing does not exceed 0.02 m/h, there is time for moisture to migrate from colloid cells to the crystal surface, where it is frozen. After thawing, lightened water can be used for industrial and agriculture applications. The concentrated sediments are supplied to press-filters to further decrease their moisture content.

=== Desalination of seawater ===
The existing commercialized desalination methods are multi-stage flash evaporation, vapor-compression, multi-effect evaporation, reverse osmosis and electrodialysis. Theoretically, freezing has some advantages over the above-mentioned methods. They include a lower theoretical energy requirement, minimal potential for corrosion, and little scaling or precipitating. The disadvantage is that freezing involves a handling of ice and water mixtures that is mechanically complicated, both as to moving and processing. A small number of desalination stations have been built over the last 50 years, but the process has not been a commercial success in the production of freshwater for municipal purposes. Pumpable ice machines offer an affordable alternative because of the high efficient crystallization process. Current models, however, do not have the necessary capacity for industrial desalination plants, but smaller models suffice for small-scale desalination needs.

=== Processes of concentration of food liquid and juice ===
Currently, reverse osmosis and vacuum-evaporation technologies are used to concentrate juices and other food liquids. In commercial operations, juice is normally concentrated by evaporation. Since 1962, the Thermally Accelerated Short Time Evaporator (TASTE) has been widely used. TASTE evaporators are efficient, sanitary, easy to clean, of high capacity, simple to operate, and of relatively low cost. On the other hand, there is some heat damage to the product caused by the high-temperature steam treatment. This treatment results in product quality and aroma losses. Because of the low value of the film coefficient between steam and treated juice, heat transfer between them is very inefficient. It leads to the cumbersome construction of TASTE plants. The alternative is to concentrate juice and food liquid by a cooling and freezing process. In this case crystals of pure water are removed from the juice, wine, or beer by crystallization. The aroma, color, and flavor remain in the concentrated medium. The quality of freeze-concentrated products cannot be achieved by any other technology. The main advantages in comparison with other freezing techniques are low energy expenditure and the possibility to tune the rate of the phase change from liquid to solid ice, which in turn increases the production of pure water ice crystals and simplifies the separation of concentrated juice or food liquid and ice crystals.

=== Production of frozen food liquids ===
In the 1990s, frozen carbonated beverages and frozen uncarbonated beverages began to enjoy great popularity.

The manufacture (process and refrigeration equipment) of almost all frozen carbonated beverages and frozen uncarbonated beverages is organized like the production of pumpable ice.

==== Frozen carbonated beverages ====
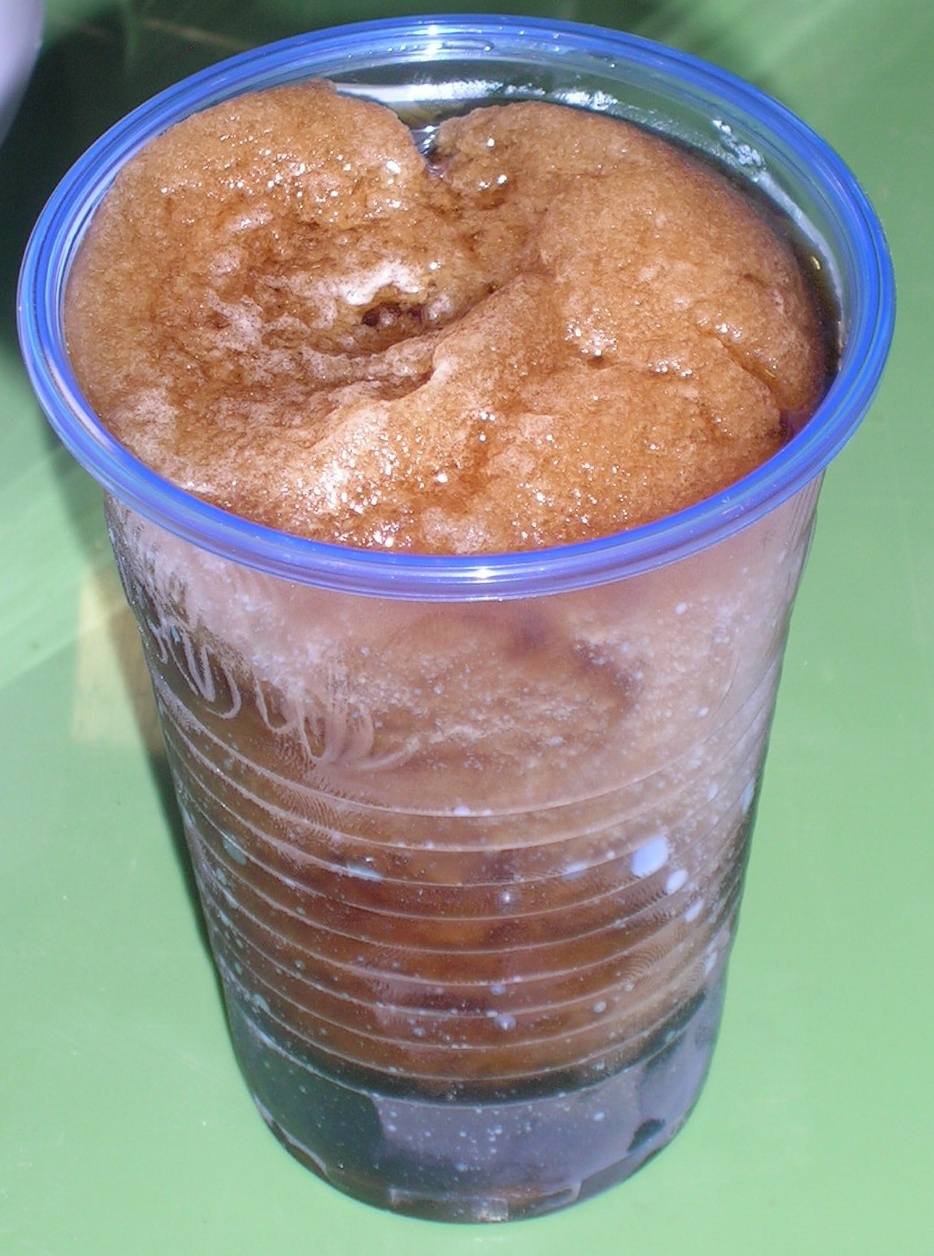
Frozen Coke

The frozen carbonated beverage machine was invented in the late 1950s by Omar Knedlik.

For frozen carbonated beverage manufacturing, a mixture of flavored syrup, carbon dioxide gas (CO_{2}) and filtered water are used. Typically, the initial temperature of the mixture is 12–18 °C. The carbonated mixture is fed into the evaporator of the apparatus, then freezes on the inner surface of the cylindrical evaporator and is scraped off by the blades—mixers rotating at 60 to 200 rpm. In the internal volume of the crystallizer, a slight positive pressure (up to 3 bar) is maintained to improve the dissolution of gas into the liquid. In modern frozen carbonated beverage devices, there is a conventional refrigeration circuit with a capillary tube or thermostatic expansion valve and, usually, an air condenser. Refrigerant is fed either directly into the cavity of a two-wall evaporator or into the spiral evaporator wound on the outer surface of the crystallizer. The evaporator wall is made of stainless-steel grade SS316L, approved for contact with food according to requirements of the US Food and Drug Administration. The evaporator temperature is −32 to −20 °C. Manufacturers do not reveal the hourly capacity of frozen carbonated beverages machines, but the energy expenditure to produce 10.0 kg of frozen carbonated beverages can be 1.5–2.0 kWh.

After mixing and freezing in the crystallizer-mixer, the frozen carbonated beverage is ejected through the nozzle into cups. The end product is a thick mixture of suspended ice crystals with a relatively small amount of liquid. Frozen carbonated beverage quality depends on many factors, including the concentration, size and structure of the ice crystals. The concentration of the ice water mixture is determined accurately in accordance with the phase diagram of the solution and can reach 50%. The maximum crystal size is 0.5 mm to 1.0 mm. The initial temperature of crystallization of the mixture depends on the initial concentration of ingredients in the water and lies between −2.0 °C and −0.5 °C. The final temperature of the product varies between −6.0 °C and −2.0 °C, depending on the manufacturer.

Interest in frozen carbonated beverages was noted in India. The Indian government prohibits the addition of ice produced from municipal water to beverages due to the probability of bacteriological contamination. Using a carbonated beverage in the form of frozen Coke offered a method to create an ice-chilled beverage in India.

==== Frozen uncarbonated beverages ====
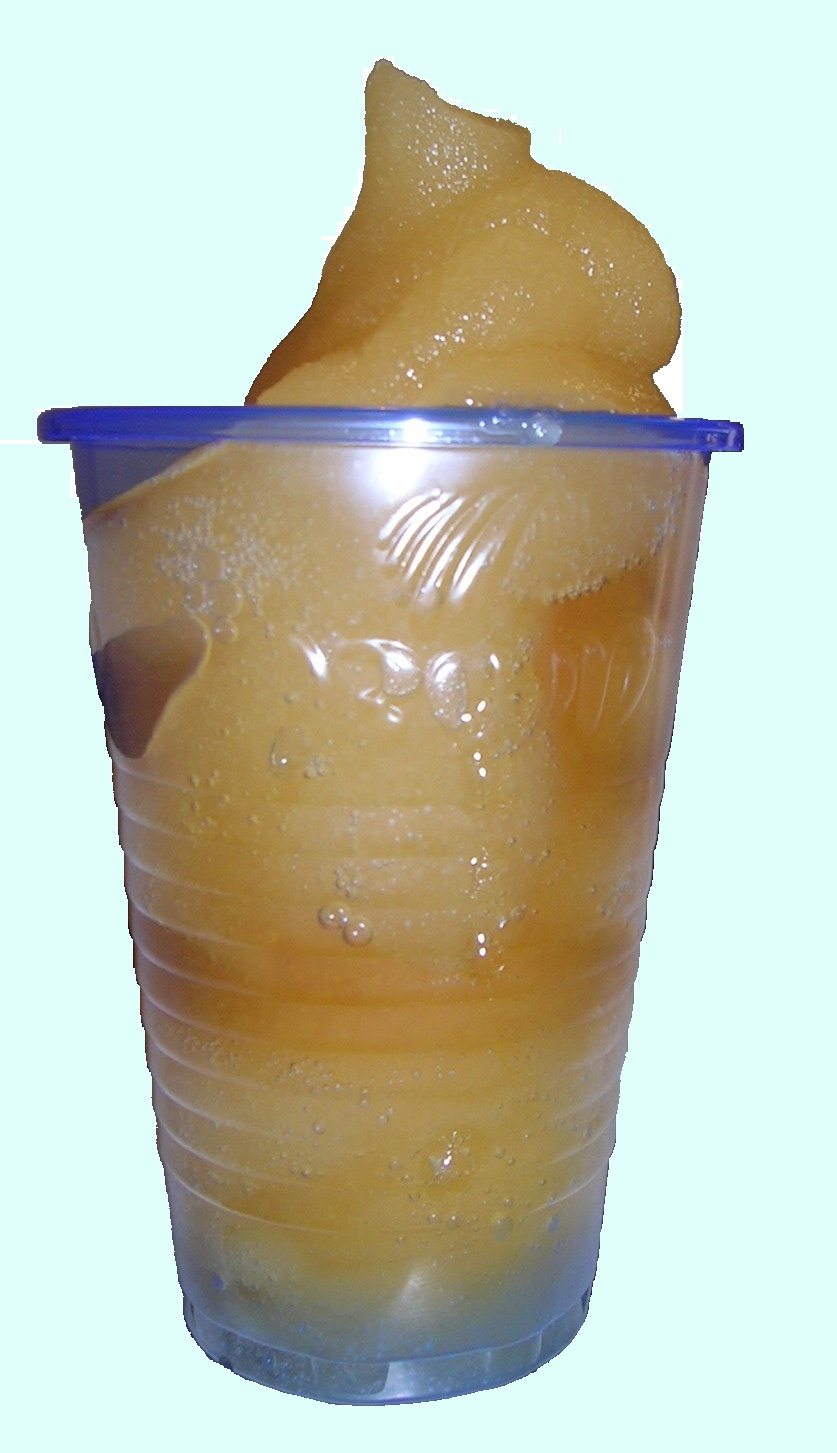
Frozen orange juice

Initially, frozen carbonated beverages were produced using fruit, vegetable juices, or drinks based on coffee, tea or yogurt. Research is being conducted on producing frozen wine and beer.

Frozen uncarbonated beverage machines differ from frozen carbonated beverage machines in that they do not require a small positive pressure to be maintained in the working volume of the evaporator, nor a source of carbon dioxide gas, nor specially trained staff. Otherwise, the design of modern frozen uncarbonated beverage machines is similar to that for frozen carbonated beverages. Frozen uncarbonated beverages often have a lower concentration of ice, and more liquid water, than frozen carbonated beverages. Frozen uncarbonated beverages machines are less complicated and cheaper than frozen carbonated beverage devices, making them more common.

==== Ice cream ====
The ice cream production market steadily increased throughout the 1990s and its value is multibillions of US dollars.

The eight major ice cream markets in the world are the US, China, Japan, Germany, Italy, Russia, France and UK. The top five ice-cream consuming countries are the US, New Zealand, Denmark, Australia and Belgium.

The modern design of industrial ice cream freezers ensures a high level of machine/operator interface and top quality of the produced ice cream. The manufacturing process of ice cream production includes pasteurization, homogenization and maturation of the ice cream mixture. The prepared mixture enters into the industrial double tube scraped crystallizer – heat exchanger, in which the processes of pre-freezing and churning of ice cream are carried out. A refrigerant fluid evaporates and continually circulates in a vessel jacket. Usually, the initial temperature of an ice cream mixture is 12–18 °C. After switching on a freezer, an evaporating temperature of a refrigerant decreases down to a range from −25 to −32 °C. The final temperature of the treated mixture into the scraped surface freezer is about −5 °C, with an ice concentration of approximately 30–50%, depending on the formula. During the freezing process ice crystals form on the inside cool surface of the crystallizer wall. They are removed by blades, mixed into the bulk, and continue to decrease its temperature and to improve heat transfer within the product.

There are also rotating dashers that help to whip the mix and incorporate air into the mixture. The frozen product then goes to the distributor.

The quality of ice cream and its smooth texture depend on the structure of their ice crystals and their dimensions, and on the viscosity of the ice cream. Water freezes out of a liquid in its pure form as ice. The concentration of the remaining liquid sugar mixture increases due to water removal, hence the freezing point is further lowered. Thus the structure of ice cream can be described as a partly frozen foam with ice crystals and air bubbles occupying most of the space. Tiny fat globules flocculate and surround the air bubbles in the form of a dispersed phase. Proteins and emulsifiers in turn surround the fat globules. The continuous phase consists of a concentrated, unfrozen liquid of sugars.

The final average diameter of ice crystals depends on the rate of freezing. The faster this is, the more nucleation is promoted and the greater the number of small ice crystals. Usually, after a cooling treatment ice crystal dimensions in the freezer are about 35–80 μm.

=== Fishery and food industry ===
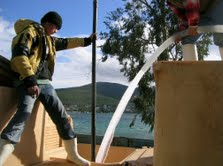
Tub filled with pumpable ice made from seawater

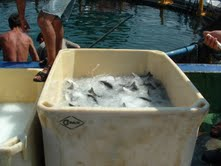
Fish cooled by pumpable ice

Pumpable-ice-technology-based equipment can be used in the cooling processes in the fishery and food industries. In comparison with freshwater solid ice, the main advantages are the following: homogeneity, higher cooling rates of food and fish. Pumpable ice flows like water and eliminates freeze burns and physical damage to the cooled object; it increases food quality enabling a longer shelf life. Pumpable ice technology meets Food Safety and Public health regulations (HACCP and ISO). Pumpable ice has a lower specific energy expenditure compared with existing technologies using conventional freshwater solid ice.

=== Supermarkets ===
Refrigeration systems using pumpable ice technology are attractive for the air cooling of supermarket counters (showcases). For this application, pumpable ice is circulated through the already available piping as a coolant, replacing environmentally unfriendly refrigerants like R-22 (Freon) and other hydrochlorofluorocarbons (HCFC's). Reasons to use pumpable ice technology for this application are the following:

1. Pumpable ice heat transfer rates result in compact equipment. The equipment is smaller than that of other vendors of refrigeration equipment of the same capacity. It occupies less floor area, has lower volume and weight;
2. Pumpable ice structure results in substantially better parameters of this cooling medium. Greater capacities can be calculated, whether per one pass of the solution through the evaporator, per unit floor area occupied by the equipment, or per unit weight of the equipment;
3. With pumpable ice technology it is easy to maintain a constant temperature inside supermarket display cases or cabinets;
4. Pumpable ice technology enables the cooling system to be more flexible, so the food cabinets can be easily rearranged according to increased or decreased requirements;
5. Pumpable-ice-technology-based show cabinets need less refrigeration piping, less labor to install and lower cost to find leaks in comparison with direct expansion and refrigerant pump circulation systems;
6. Due to the high efficiency of pumpable ice technology, the heat transfer process takes place with a very low refrigerant charge in the cooling equipment;
7. Unlike direct expansion systems, pumpable-ice-technology-based display cabinets and cases do not produce heat, since there is no need for air condensers under the cabinets. Therefore, the air around the cabinets is not heated;
8. With pumpable ice technology, less energy is needed for defrosting supermarket display cases and cabinets.

=== Production of ice wine ===
Wide perspectives for pumpable ice usage open up for the production of special wines reminiscent of "ice wine" (German Eiswein). In comparison with the existing technology for ice wine production, pumpable ice technology does not require a wait of a few months for the freezing of the grapes. Freshly squeezed grapes are harvested in a specific container connected to the pumpable ice machine. The juice is pumped through this machine, from which comes a mixture of ice (in the form of tiny, pure ice crystals) and a somewhat concentrated juice. Liquid ice returns to the accumulation tank, in which there is a natural (according to Archimedes law) separation of ice and juice. The cycle is repeated many times until the sugar concentration reaches 50–52°Brix. Then a process of fermentation takes place, resulting in this alcoholic drink.

=== Thermal energy storage systems ===
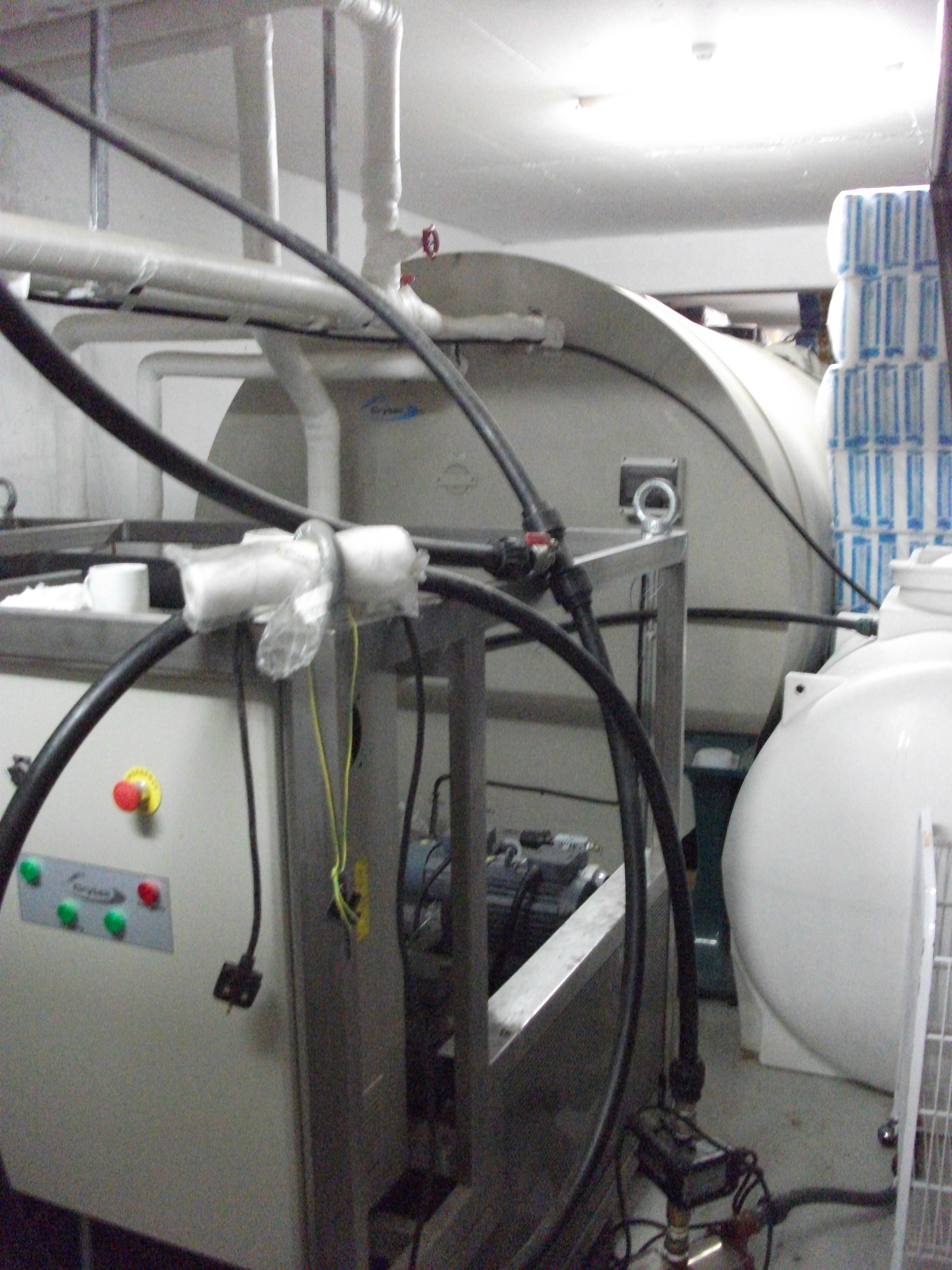
Pumpable ice maker and storage tank installed in a basement of Cyprus Olimpic supermarket

A pumpable-ice-based Thermal Energy Storage System (TESS) can be used in centralized water-cooled air-conditioning systems in order to eliminate peak demand loads at critical times. This reduces the operating costs of buildings, the need for new power plants and modern transmission lines, power plant energy consumption and pollution, and greenhouse gas emissions. The idea is to make and accumulate pumpable ice during off-peak electricity hours with the lowest kWh tariff. The stored pumpable ice is used during middle- or high-tariff hours to cool the equipment or air supplied to the buildings. The return on investments (ROI) takes 2–4 years. In comparison with static and dynamic ice storage systems, the overall heat transfer coefficient (OHTC) during the production of pumpable ice is more than tens or hundreds of times higher (more efficient) than the same coefficient for the above-mentioned TESS types. This is explained by the presence of many different kinds of thermal resistances between the boiling refrigerant at the evaporator and water/ice in the storage tanks of static and dynamic ice storage systems. The high OHTC value pumpable-ice-technology-based TESS means a decrease in component volume, an increase in the maximum achievable concentration of ice in the volume of a storage tank, and ultimately a decrease in the price of equipment. TESS based on pumpable ice technology have been installed in Japan, Korea, US, UK and Saudi Arabia.

=== Medicine ===
A protective cooling process based on the implementation of a developed special ice slurry has been developed for medical applications. In this case pumpable ice can be injected intra-arterially, intravenously, along the external surfaces of organs using laparoscopy, or even via the endotracheal tube. It is being confirmed that pumpable ice can selectively cool organs to prevent or limit ischemic damage after a stroke or heart attack. Completed medical tests on animals simulated conditions requiring in-hospital kidney laparoscopic procedures. Results of French and US research are yet to be approved by the U.S. Food and Drug Administration. Benefits of pumpable ice technology in medicinal applications are:

1. Pumpable ice can be pumped easily through narrow catheters, providing high cooling capacity and rapid and targeted cooling of organs;
2. Pumpable ice may provide protective cooling and temperature management of target organs during surgery;
3. Pumpable ice helps victims of such medical emergencies as cardiac arrest and stroke.

=== Ski resorts ===
Ski resorts have a strong interest in producing snow, even when the ambient temperature is as high as 20 °C. The dimensions and power expenditure of known snow-production equipment depend on humidity and wind conditions. This snow-making equipment is based on the freezing of water droplets which are sprayed into air before they reach the ground surface, and requires an ambient temperature lower than −4 °C.

Pumpable ice produced by Vacuum Ice Maker (VIM) Technology allows professional skiers to increase their training periods to extend before and after winter season (into late autumn and early spring). The pumpable ice process is organized as following. A salt solution is exposed to very low pressure inside the VIM. A small part of it evaporates in the form of water due to the vacuum forces, while the remaining liquid is frozen, forming a mixture. The water vapor is continuously evacuated from the VIM, compressed, and fed into a condenser due to the special construction of the centrifugal compressor. A standard water chiller supplies cooling water at 5 °C in order to condense the water vapor. The liquid-ice mixture is pumped out from the freezing volume to the ice concentrator in which ice crystals separate from the liquid. The high concentration ice is extracted from the concentrator. VIMs have been installed at Austrian and Swiss ski resorts.

== See also ==
- Air conditioning
- Crystallization (engineering aspects)
- Dynamic scraped surface heat exchanger
- Fish processing
- Fractional freezing
- Freeze distillation
- Frozen carbonated beverage
- Frozen yogurt
- Ice beer
- Ice cream
- Icemaker
- Ice pigging
- Ice wine
- Slush (beverage)
- Supercooling
- Therapeutic hypothermia
- Thermal Energy Storage
- Snowmaking
- Centrifugal compressor
