= The Icee Company =

American beverage company

- Industry: Beverage
- Founded: 1958
- Founder: Omar Knedlik
- Headquarters: La Vergne, Tennessee, United States
- Key people: Dan Fachner (CEO)
- Products: Frozen soda, Italian ice
- Brands: Icee, Slush Puppie
- Number of employees: >1000 (2020)
- Parent: J & J Snack Foods
- Website: icee.com

The Icee Company (also known as Western Icee and Icee USA) is an American beverage company located in La Vergne, Tennessee, United States. Its flagship product is the Icee (stylized as ICEE), which is a frozen carbonated beverage available in fruit and soda flavors. Icee also produces other frozen beverages and Italian ice pops under the Icee and Slush Puppie brands. ICEE Bear, an animated polar bear, is the company's mascot.

The Icee Company was founded by Omar Knedlik, the inventor of the original Icee drink. It became the foundation for the Slurpee and other frozen machine drinks after several machines made by the company were purchased by 7-Eleven in 1965. It has been a division of J & J Snack Foods since 1988 and distributes products in the United States, Canada, Mexico, Guatemala, Australia, the United Kingdom, China, Japan and the Middle East.

== History ==
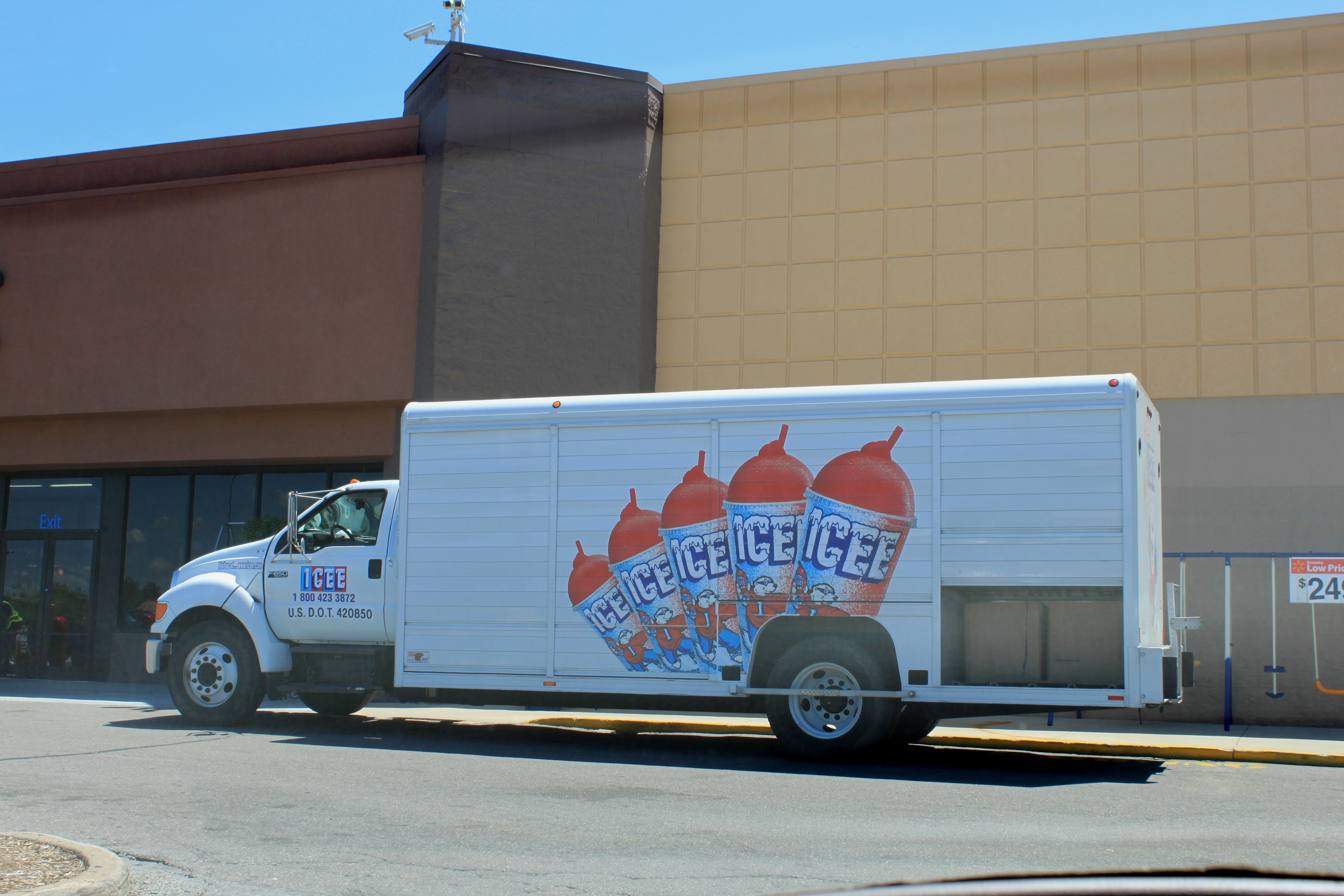
Icee delivery truck at a Walmart in Ypsilanti Township, Michigan

The Icee was invented in 1958 by Omar Knedlik, a Dairy Queen owner in Coffeyville, Kansas. The beverage was the result of faulty equipment in the Dairy Queen owned by Knedlik. His soda machine broke and he began placing bottles of soda in the freezer to keep them cold. Knedlik began selling bottles of the soda which would instantly turn to slush once opened. The frozen soda became popular with the customers of the establishment.

The name Icee as well as the original company logo were developed by Ruth E. Taylor, a local artist and friend of Knedlik. She developed the name "Icee", as well as the idea of the logo's icicles hanging from the block letters, which has remained unchanged. She thought of the Polar Bear, but the actual bear mascot had already been created by the Norsworthy-Mercer ad agency. The "Icee" word with the snow on it was designed by a Mitchell Company staff artist, Lonnie Williams, as part of a cup he designed.

Knedlik partnered with the John E Mitchell Company in Dallas to develop the machine, for which Knedlik received a patent in 1960. The first machine was made from a car air conditioning unit. It worked by combining freezing water, carbon dioxide, and a flavor mix. After five years, Knedlik's idea had become the iconic Icee Machine after drawing the attention of 7-Eleven. The convenience store chain purchased several machines and later changed the product name to Slurpee based on the slurping sound people make when drinking the beverage.

The Mitchell Company instituted a two-tiered franchise plan involving "Developers" and "Subdevelopers". Essentially, the Developers and Subdevelopers both paid fees and rentals for the right to use specified numbers of Icee dispensers and for rights within exclusive territories to distribute the machines and to promote the sale of the Icee drink. By the mid-1960s, 300 Icee machines had been manufactured.

J & J Snack Foods purchased The Icee Company in 1987. In December 2019, the company moved their headquarters from Ontario, California to La Vergne, Tennessee.

== Products and licensing ==
Some American McDonald's and Subway restaurants inside Walmart stores sell Icees. Burger King restaurants and Sam's Club cafe locations in the US sell Icees and Icee Floats. In Mexico, Icee is widely available at department stores such as Walmart and inside movie theaters and convenience stores. Icee is also the primary frozen beverage sold in Wawa and QuickChek, two convenience store chains in the Mid-Atlantic region of the US. Icee is available at Valero gas stations co-branded with their Corner Store marts (except for independently owned stores) as well as at most Rainforest Café locations.

In 2019, Icee expanded into the United Kingdom for the first time, by partnering with Vimto, a UK-based international soft drinks manufacturer. A Europe-wide contract to supply the Cineworld cinema chain quickly followed. In late 2019 / early 2020 another European-wide contract to supply Showcase Cinemas further expanded the brand across Europe.

== See also ==
- List of frozen dessert brands
