= Western Hills High School (Cincinnati, Ohio) =

Location
- 2144 Ferguson Road; Cincinnati, (Hamilton County), Ohio 45238; United States; 39°7′29″N 84°36′2″W

Information
- Type: Public high school
- Established: 1928
- Superintendent: Laura Mitchell
- Principal: Carlos Blair
- Grades: 7–12
- Campus: Urban
- Colors: Maroon and Cream
- Athletics conference: Cincinnati Metro Athletic Conference
- Mascot: Mustang
- Team name: Mustangs
- Accreditation: North Central Association of Colleges and Schools
- Newspaper: The Breeze
- Website: www.cps-k12.org

Western Hills High School, or "West High", is a high school located in the Western Hills area of Cincinnati, Ohio, United States. It is part of the Cincinnati Public Schools district.

The school houses two programs: Western Hills Design Technology High School and Western Hills University High School. But the building houses Western Hills Design Technology, Western Hills University and Dater High School.

Western Hills High School was established in 1928. In 1938, the two wings were built to accommodate more classrooms.

== Notable alumni ==
- Art Mahaffey — baseball pitcher, 2-time All-Star player
- Herm Wehmeier — baseball pitcher
- Jim Boyle — former Pittsburgh Steelers player
- Ed Brinkman — baseball infielder – Gold Glove Award winner, All Star selection, Washington Senators, Detroit Tigers, St. Louis Cardinals, Texas Rangers, & New York Yankees
- Rosemary Clooney — popular singer and actress
- Betty Clooney – singer, actress and television host
- Jim Frey — baseball manager, Kansas City Royals (1980–1981), Chicago Cubs (1984–1986)
- Rodney Heath — American footballer, Cincinnati Bengals (1999–2001); Atlanta Falcons (2002)
- Richard H. Lineback — President and Founder of the Philosopher's Information Center, Founder and Editor of The Philosopher's Index, and is Professor Emeritus in the Department of Philosophy at Bowling Green State University
- Mike Middleton — former NFL player
- Russ Nixon — baseball manager, Cincinnati Reds (1982–1983); Atlanta Braves (1988–1990)
- Will Radcliff — creator of the Slush Puppie
- Jack Reynolds — American footballer, Los Angeles Rams (1970–1980); San Francisco 49ers (1981–1984)
- Tuffy Rhodes — baseball player, all-time home run leader for foreign-born players in Nippon Professional Baseball in Japan
- Pete Rose — baseball, MLB's all-time hit king, Cincinnati Reds (1963–1978, 1984–1986); Philadelphia Phillies (1979–1983); Montreal Expos (1984)
- Chuck Share - NBA player
- Andy Williams — singer
- Don Zimmer — baseball manager, San Diego Padres (1972–1973); Boston Red Sox (1976–1980); Texas Rangers (1981–1982); Chicago Cubs (1988–1991); New York Yankees (1999) (interim)
