= Frutina =

British Slush drink and cereal bar brand

- Company type: Private
- Industry: Food and beverage
- Founded: October 1996
- Owner: Mark Peters (slush drinks); Friends of Health Limited (cereal bars)
- Website: https://www.frutina.co.uk

Frutina is a British slush drink and cereal bar brand created in October 1996.

== History ==
In October 1996, Frutina was created by Frozen Drinks Ltd, who renamed themselves as Frutina Limited in February 1999. The company later expanded the Frutina brand into frozen milkshakes and iced coffee, as well as focusing on making Frutina the healthier slush option over rival, Slush Puppie. It would target schools and other educational institutions for distribution, priding itself on no artificial flavourings.

In August 2011, Frutina was acquired by Slush Puppie Limited for an undisclosed sum after becoming their biggest rival. Slush Puppie Limited would also establish Frutina as a cereal bar brand in the mid-2010s. In November 2020, Slush Puppie Limited rebranded itself as Frozen Brothers Limited. The ownership of the Frutina name was transferred out of the Frozen Brothers Limited business and assigned to its co-owner, Mark Peters.

In December 2020, the ownership of the Frutina name for snack and cereal bar purposes was assigned outright to licensee, Friends of Health Limited. The Frutina brand continues to owned by Mark Peters and licensed to Frozen Brothers Limited for slush drink purposes.
