= Dynamic scraped surface heat exchanger =

The dynamic scraped surface heat exchanger (DSSHE) is a type of heat exchanger used to remove or add heat to fluids, mainly foodstuffs, but also other industrial products. They have been designed to address specific problems that impede efficient heat transfer. DSSHEs improve efficiency by removing fouling layers, increasing turbulence in the case of high viscosity flow, and avoiding the generation of crystals and other process by-products. DSSHEs incorporate an internal mechanism which periodically removes the product from the heat transfer wall. The sides are scraped by blades made of a rigid plastic material to prevent damage to the scraped surface.

== Introduction ==
An applicable technologies for indirect heat transfer use tubes (shell-and-tube exchangers) or flat surfaces (plate exchangers). Their goal is to exchange the maximum amount of heat per unit area by generating as much turbulence as possible below given pumping power limits. Typical approaches to achieve this consist of corrugating the tubes or plates or extending their surface with fins. However, these geometry conformation technologies, the calculation of optimum mass flows and other turbulence related factors become diminished when fouling appears, obliging designers to fit significantly larger heat transfer areas. There are several types of fouling, including particulate accumulation, precipitation (crystallization), sedimentation, generation of ice layers, etc.

Another factor posing difficulties to heat transfer is viscosity. Highly viscous fluids tend to generate deep laminar flow, a condition with very poor heat transfer rates and high pressure losses involving a considerable pumping power, often exceeding the exchanger design limits. This problem becomes worsened frequently when processing non-newtonian fluids.

The DSSHE has been designed to face the aforementioned problems. They increase heat transfer by: removing the fouling layers, increasing turbulence in case of high viscosity flow, and avoiding the generation of ice and other process by-products.

== Description ==
The dynamic scraped surface heat exchangers incorporate an internal mechanism which periodically removes the product from the heat transfer wall. The product side is scraped by blades attached to a moving shaft or frame. The blades are made of a rigid plastic material to prevent damage to the scraped surface. This material is FDA approved in the case of food applications.

== Types ==
There are basically three types of DSSHEs depending on the arrangement of the blades:

1. Rotating, tubular DSSHEs. The shaft is placed parallel to the tube axis, not necessarily coincident, and spins at various frequencies, from a few dozen rpm to more than 1000 rpm. The number of blades oscillates between 1 and 4 and may take advantage of centrifugal forces to scrape the inner surface of the tube. Examples are the Waukesha Cherry-Burrell Votator II, Alfa Laval Contherm, Terlet Terlotherm and Kelstream's scraped surface heat exchanger. Another example is the HRS Heat Exchangers R Series or Sakura Seisakusho Ltd. Japan Onlator.
2. Reciprocating, tubular DSSHEs. The shaft is concentric to the tube and moves longitudinally without rotating. The frequency spans between 10 and 60 strokes per minute. The blades may vary in number and shape, from baffle-like arrangements to perforated disk configurations. An example is the HRS Heat Exchangers Unicus.
3. Rotating, plate DSSHEs. The blades wipe the external surface of circular plates arranged in series inside a shell. The heating/cooling fluid runs inside the plates. The frequency is about several dozen rpm. An example is the HRS Spiratube T-Sensation.

== Evaluation ==
Computational fluid dynamics (CFD) techniques are the standard tools to analyse and evaluate heat exchangers and similar equipment. However, for quick calculation purposes, the evaluation of DSSHEs are usually carried out with the help of ad hoc (semi)empirical correlations based on the Buckingham π theorem:

Fa = Fa(Re, Re', n, ...)

for pressure loss and

Nu = Nu(Re, Re', Pr, Fa, L/D, N, ...)

for heat transfer, where Nu is the Nusselt number, Re is the standard Reynolds number based on the inner diameter of the tube, Re' is the specific Reynolds number based on the wiping frequency, Pr is the Prandtl number, Fa is the Fanning friction factor, L is the length of the tube, D is the inner diameter of the tube, n is the number of blades and the dots account for any other relevant dimensionless parameters.

== Applications ==
The range of applications covers a number of industries, including food, chemical, petrochemical and pharmaceutical. The DSSHEs are appropriate whenever products are prone to fouling, very viscous, particulate, heat sensitive or crystallizing.

== See also ==
- Pumpable ice technology

== Related reading ==
- Bott, T. R. (May 1966). Design of Scraped Surface Heat Exchangers. Vol. II, No.5. British Chemical Engineering. pp. 338–339.
- Bott, T. R. (November 2001). To Foul or not to Foul. CEP Magazine. pp. 30–37.
- Bott, T. R.; Romero, J. J. B. (October 1963). Heat Transfer Across a Scraped Surface. The Canadian Journal of Chemical Engineering. pp. 213–219.
- Chong, A. (2001). A Study of Scraped-Surface Heat Exchanger in Ice-Making Applications, M. Sc. Thesis. University of Toronto.
- "Scraped surface heat exchangers project webpage". Smith Institute. Archived from the original on 2009-03-04.
- Tähti, T. (2004). Suspension Melt Crystallization in Tubular and Scraped Surface Heat Exchangers, Ph. D. Thesis. Martin-Luther-Universität.
- "Scraped-Surface Heat-Exchanger Project page". University of Southampton. Archived from the original on 2009-03-04.
