= Froster =

Iced frozen beverages

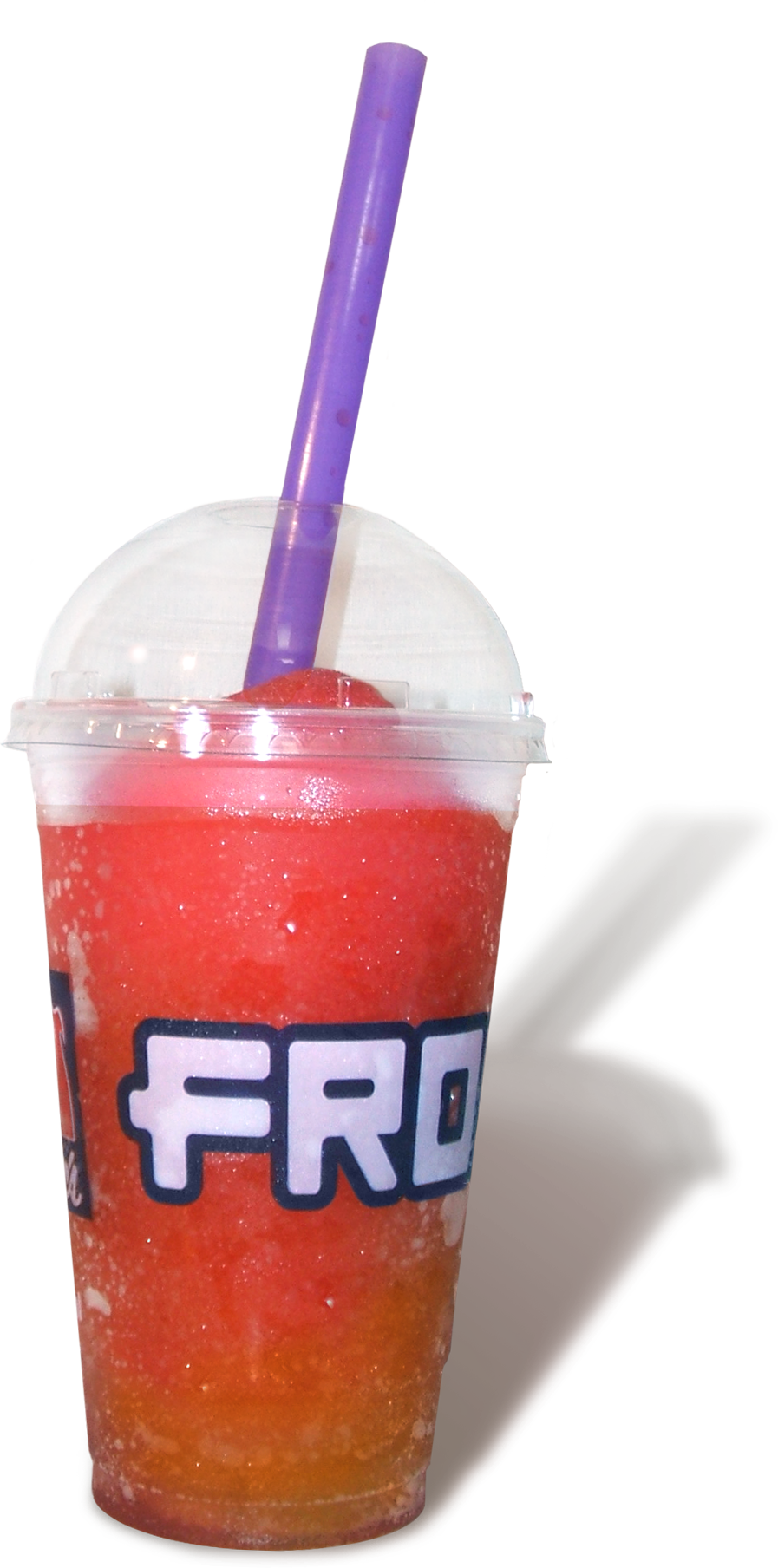
A 710 mL Froster from Mac's

Froster is a brand of iced frozen carbonated beverage (however, not pressurized, still carbonated in Canada) sold at Circle K in the United States, Canada, Ireland, and Lithuania.

== Marketing ==
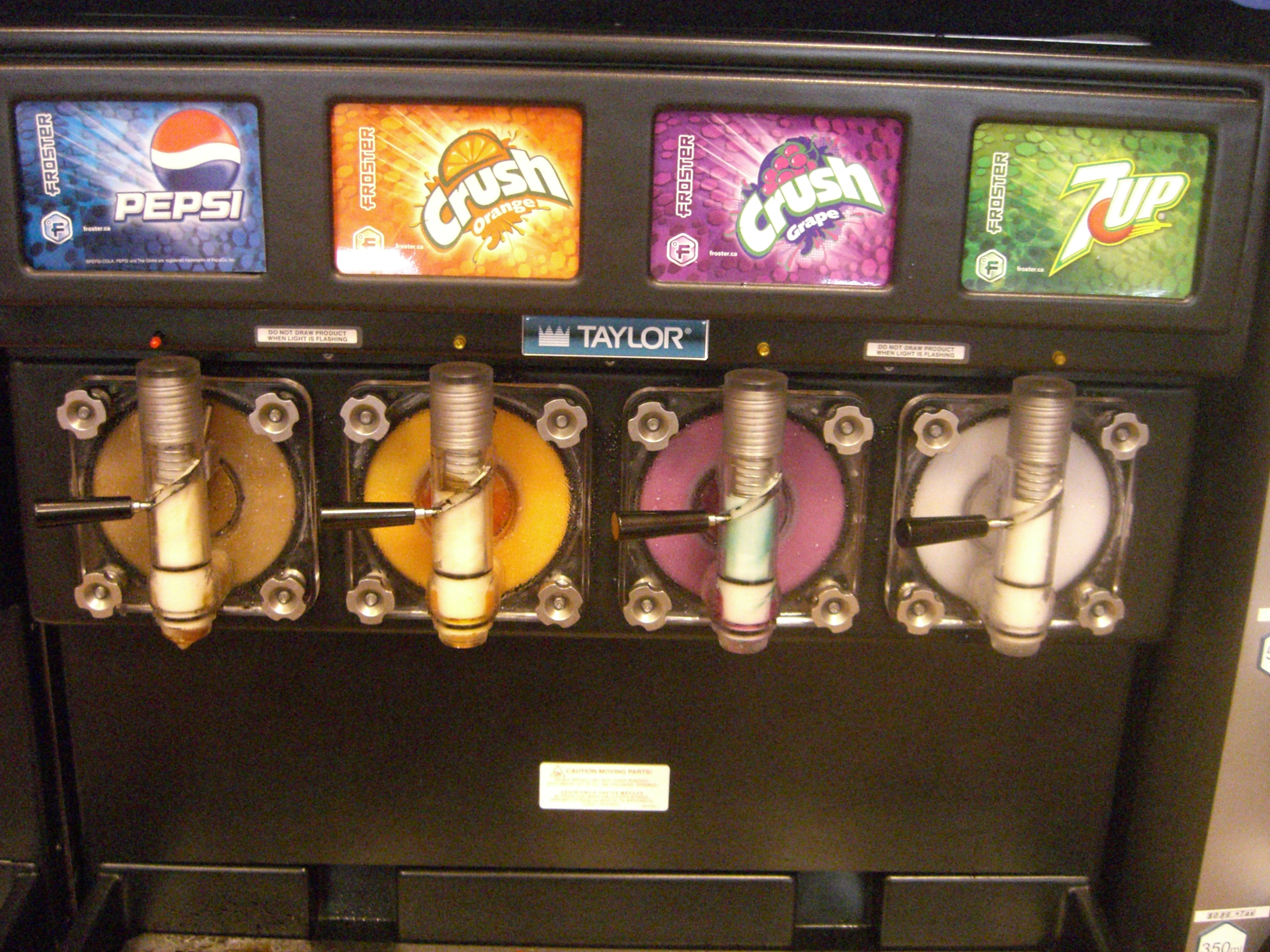
A typical Froster machine in Edmonton

In 2006, a Froster advertising campaign was run that features a Froster flavor called "Whack". The campaign centers on the Whack flavor and uses double entendres involving the word, such as "I think I could have a Whack every day if I could," as well as humorously bleeping out the word "Whack" in the commercials.

In May 2007, Mac's introduced a controversial advertising campaign for their new WTF Froster beverage. Targeting primarily internet savvy teenage youth, the campaign included posters and a series of viral internet video ads. The controversy stems from the use of the WTF internet slang acronym "What the Fuck", a poster of a nun and goat bowing in the presence of a cup of WTF and video ads portraying sexual innuendo and bizarre or questionable conduct. In response Mac's has pulled the more controversial ads and has stated that it intended WTF to refer to "What's the flavour?".

In 2008, another controversial Froster advertising campaign was launched that uses the acronym "STFU" (which in Internet lingo stands for "shut the fuck up"). The website states the acronym means "suck the Froster up".

As of August 2014, the current campaign is "Take It Easy".

== Flavors ==
The official Froster website lists the flavors:

- Coca-Cola
- Coca-Cola Cherry
- Fanta Sour Green Apple Watermelon
- Fanta Banana
- Barq's Cream Soda
- Powerade Ion
- Barq's Root Beer
- Crush Orange
- Dr Pepper
- Mountain Dew
- Fanta Orange Freeze

Other flavours do exist, such as Pepsi. Typically, older Mac's stores will not use "Fanta" or other technically correct names. It is quite common to find Crush labelled flavours, as well as flavours named as bluntly as "Banana".

== See also ==
- Sloche, a similar product sold by Couche-Tard in Quebec.
- List of frozen dessert brands
