= Frozen (alcoholic drink) =

Slushy made with alcohol

Frozen alcoholic drink
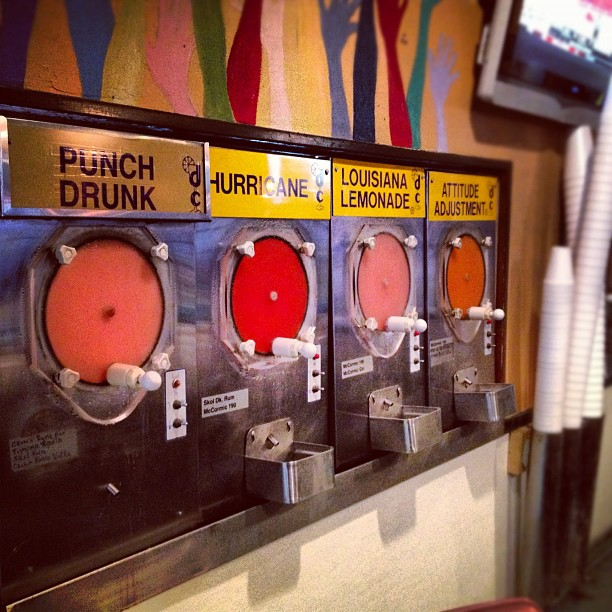
- A frozen daiquiri bar in Louisiana.
- Type: Slushy (beverage)

A frozen, also called an alcoholic slushy, is a type of slushy made with alcohol. The alcoholic and non-alcoholic ingredients are processed in a blender to create a slush texture.

== Types ==
There are several types of frozen alcoholic drink made from various cocktails. Some of these include:

- Frozen daiquiri
- Frozen Mai Tai
- Frozen margarita
- Frozen screwdriver
- Phrostie
- Tequila slushie
