= Stadaconé =

Studio album by Sloche
- Released: 1976
- Genre: Progressive rock, jazz fusion
- Length: 41:01
- Label: RCA

Sloche chronology
J'un Oeil (1975)	Stadaconé (1976)

Stadaconé is the title of a 1976 album by the band Sloche.

== Track list ==
1. "Stadaconé" – 10:16
2. "Le Cosmophile" – 5:40
3. "Il Faut Sauver Barbara" - 4:18
4. "Ad Hoc" – 4:28
5. "La Baloune De Varenkurtel Au Zythogala" – 4:58
6. "Isacaaron (Le Démon Des Choses Sexuelles)" – 11:21

== Personnel ==
- Réjean Yacola - Keyboards, Vocals
- Martin Murray - Keyboards, Saxophone, Tambourin
- Caroll Bérard - Guitars, Talk Box, Percussions
- Pierre Hébert - Bass
- André Roberge - Drums, Timpani, Tam-Tam, Percussions
- Gilles Ouellet - Celesta, Percussions
