= J&J Snack Foods =

American snack food manufacturer

J&J Snack Foods Corp.
- Type: Public
- Traded as: Nasdaq: JJSF; S&P 600 Component
- Industry: Snack foods and beverages
- Founded: 1971; 55 years ago
- Founder: Gerald B. Shreiber
- Headquarters: Mount Laurel, New Jersey, U.S.
- Key people: Dan Fachner (CEO & chairman of the board); Shawn Munsell (CFO); Lynwood Mallard (CMO)
- Revenue: ▲$1.57 billion USD (2024)
- Net income: ▲$79.2 million USD (2017)
- Number of employees: 4,200
- Website: jjsnack.com

J&J Snack Foods Corp. (JJSFC) is an American manufacturer, marketer, and distributor of name brand snack foods and frozen beverages. Headquartered in Mt. Laurel, NJ, JJSF uses over 175 facilities for manufacturing, warehousing, and distributing located in 44 states, Mexico, and Canada. The company is listed on the NASDAQ Global Select Market as "JJSFC", and serves both national and international markets.

JJSFC's portfolio of products includes soft pretzels, frozen beverages, frozen juice treats and desserts, stuffed sandwiches, burritos, churros, fruit pies, funnel cakes, cookies, and bakery goods, and other snack foods and drinks. JJSFC has a total of 25 brands with its principal brands in these product arenas including Superpretzel Soft Pretzels, Pretzel Fillers, Icee, Slush Puppie, Arctic Blast, Pepe Churros, California Churros, Funnel Cake Factory funnel cakes, Luigi's Real Italian Ice, Daddy Ray's fruit bars, and Philly Swirl, Whole Fruit, BeneFIT Baked Bars, and Minute Maid frozen novelties.

Since the company's CEO, Gerald B. Shreiber, purchased J & J Soft Pretzel company in 1971, it has seen 44 years of consecutive sales growth. This growth can be attributed to a strategy that emphasizes active development of new and innovative products, penetration into existing market channels and expansion of established products into new markets. The company is structured in three business groups: Food Service, Frozen Beverages, and Retail Supermarket.

== History ==
=== 1970s ===
In 1971, Gerald Shreiber, a father of three at the time, was shopping for a waterbed for his daughter. Shreiber struck up a conversation with the store's owner who was discussing his investment loss in a soft pretzel company called J&J Soft Pretzel which went bankrupt. On September 27, 1971, Shreiber attended the Camden, New Jersey District Court's bankruptcy auction and purchased J&J Soft Pretzel with a bid of $72,100. The company at the time had eight employees and $400,000 of sales. In 1972, a West Coast office opened up in Los Angeles, California thus opening the company up to business across the United States. A year later Superpretzel Soft Pretzel was registered as a trademark and becomes the first official brand of JJSF. In 1978 JJSF sought out to expand its presence in the soft pretzel market through the acquisitions of Frampton Corp located in St. Louis, Missouri, and Pretzel Man Corp located in Los Angeles, California. The King-sized pretzel was also introduced and sales began in food service locations.

=== 1980s ===
In 1981, Shreiber sought new possibilities for JJSF. He found what he was looking for in a cancelled supply agreement with Whimsy Stores who at the time was selling churros. JJSF acquired some product inventory as a result of this and began the foundation of the churros segment of the company starting the brand Tio Pepe's Churros. A year later, JJSF acquired exclusive rights to the AMF pretzel twister machines making the company a leader in the efficiency of soft pretzel manufacturing. In 1983, the acquisition of Bachman Soft Pretzel Co. added another manufacturing plant to JJSF's list of facilities.

By 1986 JJSF extended its product line to frozen fruit juice bars with the addition of Super Juice and to baked goods with the acquisition of Southern Food Products. Superpretzel entered the grocery store arena for the first time expanding JJSF's business outside the foodservice segment. As sales exceeded, the $25 million mark the company went public, offering 600,000 shares, and traded on NASDAQ as "JJSF". In the same year, Shreiber was introduced to the frozen beverage industry through a chance meeting with the then-owner of Icee, Omar Knedlik. One year later JJSF acquired Icee-USA, extending its product offering to frozen carbonated beverages. Through the late 1980s JJSF continued its success through a number of acquisitions and technological development. From 1988 to 1989 JJSF acquired five more companies, most notably Luigi's Real Italian Ice and MIA Products Co. The acquisition of MIA Products brought to JJSF their current frozen novelty manufacturing plant. By 1989 Luigi's was successfully introduced to super markets and sales for the entire company reached $86 million.

=== 1990s ===
In the early 1990s JJSF continued to further develop its soft pretzel line by introducing bite-sized snacks. Superpretzel Soft Pretzel Bites are introduced to food service arenas in 1990 and a partnership with Kraft helped add the cheese-filled soft pretzel brand, Superpretzel Softstix, to grocery store shelves in 1992. Additionally, JJSF renovated their Pennsauken, NJ soft pretzel facility into a 104,000-square foot distribution centre in 1993. The 1990s brought in another stretch of acquisitions for JJSF, further extending the company into new markets and developing its presence in its current markets. In 1994 the company acquired The Funnel Cake Factory making JJSF a dominant force in the fried desserts category. The frozen beverage category was further developed with the 1992 acquisition of Arctic Blast and 1995 acquisition of international rights for the Icee brand. The soft pretzel category grew with the 1994 acquisition of Bavarian Soft Pretzels, Inc., the 1996 acquisitions of Pretzel Gourmet Corp and Bakers Best Snack Food Corp., and the 1997 acquisition of Texas Twist Soft Pretzels. In an effort to extend its frozen novelty category JJSF acquired Mazzone Enterprises, Inc. in 1996 and Mama Tish's International Foods in 1997. The acquisitions of Mrs. Goodcookie in 1998 and Camden Creek Bakery in 1999 extended the company's presence in the baked goods category.

Among these acquisitions, JJSF made its largest acquisition in 1998 of the National Icee Corp. through the Icee-USA subsidiary. At the time, National Icee Corp. had about $40 million in annual sales, distributing mainly to the Eastern USA. The acquisition significantly increased the JJSF frozen beverage category's success, and it continues to be its largest acquisition to date. A year later, JJSF established a long-term partnership with The Minute Maid Company. The partnership provides JJSF with exclusive rights to manufacture, sell, and distribute frozen juice products under the Minute Maid name. This partnership opened JJSF to the development of its frozen novelty category in frozen juice and soft frozen lemonades.

=== 2000s ===
At the turn of the century, JJSF reached $328 million in annual sales. From 2001 to 2003 JJSF worked to further develop its soft pretzel category with the launch of cheese-filled Pretzel Fillers, the Superpretzel line extension of specialty cheese-filled pretzel sticks Superpretzel Pretzelfils, and a more traditional-tasting Gourmet Twists Topped Soft Pretzels. Throughout the next decade JJSF saw a major increase in development to its in-store bakery category. This was due mainly from the 2001 acquisition of Uptown Bakeries, who makes baked products for Wawa, the 2004 acquisition of Country Home Bakers which supply frozen dough to supermarkets, and the 2008 Jana's Indulgence Cookies acquisition. Additionally, in 2007 JJSF acquired Hom/Ade Foods Inc. and Radar, Inc., introducing Mary B's Biscuits and Daddy Ray's Fig and Fruit Bars respectively to its family of baked goods brands. In 2006 JJSF acquired Icee of Hawaii and Slush Puppie. Slush Puppie introduced JJSF to the non-carbonated beverage arena, making JJSF a leader in the frozen beverage category. Furthermore, JJSF extended its frozen novelty brands with the acquisition of Whole Fruit Sorbet, Fruit-a-Freeze Fruit Bars, and Dogsters Treats for Dogs in 2007. In 2007 the company acquired Daddy Ray's in Moscow Mills, Missouri.

=== 2010s ===
Logo c. 2015

By 2010, sales for JJSF had surpassed $600 million. In recent years the company has extended its churro product line with the 2010 acquisition of California Churro. A licensing deal with Mondelez International gave JJSF the right to manufacture, market, and distribute churros under the Oreo brand name, branding them as Oreo Churros. In 2011, the company introduced handheld sandwiches and pies to its product line with the acquisition of ConAgra's Frozen Handheld Business. In 2012, JJSF acquired Kim & Scott's Gourmet Pretzel, adding gourmet stuffed soft pretzels to its soft pretzel product line. It also acquired New York Pretzel in 2013.

In 2014, JJSF acquired Philly Famous Water Ice, Inc. also known as PhillySwirl. This introduced the unique line of SwirlStix, Candy Spoonz, Popperz, and Fruit Dips to the JJSF frozen novelty segment. By 2014 JJSF reached $800 million in sales and 25 brands.

=== 2020s ===
In 2020, the company acquired ICEE-USA, by purchasing remaining shares in a $2.4-million deal.

In May 2022, J&J Snack Foods entered into an agreement to acquire Dippin' Dots, LLC for $222 million, subject to customary purchase price adjustments. The acquisition closed on June 21, 2022.

Founder and chairman of the board Gerald B. Shreiber died on May 9th, 2026 at 84 years old.

== Products ==
=== Soft pretzels ===
JJSF soft pretzels are sold under many brand names; some of which are: Superpretzel, Pretzelfillers, Pretzelfils, Gourmet Twists, Mr. Twister, Soft Pretzel Bits, Soft Pretzelbuns, Texas Twist, Bavarian Bakery, Superpretzel Bavarian, New York Pretzel, Kim & Scott's Gourmet Pretzels, and Seriously Twisted!; and, to a lesser extent, under private labels. All soft pretzels are sold in the food service and retail Supermarket segments.

Certain soft pretzels qualify under USDA regulations as the nutritional equivalent of bread for purposes of the USDA school lunch program, thereby enabling participating schools to obtain partial reimbursement of the cost of aforementioned soft pretzels from the USDA.

All of JJSF's soft pretzels are manufactured according to a proprietary formula. The soft pretzels, ranging in size from one to ten ounces in weight, are shaped and formed by patented twister machines. These soft pretzel tying machines are automated, high-speed machines for twisting dough into the traditional pretzel shape. Additionally, some soft pretzels are extruded or shaped by hand. Soft pretzels, after processing, are primarily flash-frozen in either raw or baked form and packaged for delivery.

In the food service segment JJSF supplies ovens, mobile merchandisers, display cases, warmers, and similar merchandising equipment to the retailer to prepare and promote the sale of the soft pretzels. Some of this equipment is proprietary, including combination warmer and display cases that reconstitute frozen soft pretzels while displaying them, thus eliminating the need for an oven.

=== Frozen juice treats and desserts ===
JJSF's frozen juice treats and desserts are branded primarily under the Luigi's, Whole Fruit, Philly Swirl, Icee and Minute Maid brand names. All of these products are sold in the Food Service and Retail Supermarket segments.

Minute Maid and Whole Fruit frozen juice bars and cups for school food service contain three to four ounces of 100% apple or pineapple juice with no added sugar and 100% of the daily US FDA value of vitamin C. The juice bars are produced in various flavours and are packaged in a sealed push-up paper container referred to as the Milliken M-pak, which is believed to have certain sanitary and safety advantages.

The majority of these products are manufactured from water, sweeteners and fruit juice concentrates in various flavors and packaging including cups, tubes, sticks, M-paks and pints. Some of the products contain ice cream, while Whole Fruit contains pieces of fruit.

=== Churros ===
JJSF's churros are sold primarily under the Tio Pepe's, California Churros, and Oreo brand names. These products are sold in the Food Service and Retail Supermarkets segments. Churros are Hispanic pastries in stick form which JJSF produces in several sizes according to a proprietary formula. The churros are deep-fried, frozen, and packaged. At food service point-of-sale outlets, they are reheated and topped with a cinnamon-sugar mixture. Churros also come in fruit and crème-filled varieties. Similar to the soft pretzel equipment program, JJSF supplies all churro merchandising equipment to its food service customers.

=== Handheld products ===
JJSF's dough enrobed handheld products are marketed under the Patio, Pillsbury, Supreme Stuffers, and Sweet Stuffers brand names, and under private labels. The handheld products consist of an outer shell of varying dough consistencies anything from burrito shell to pastry/pie shells with a variety of fillings. Handheld products are sold in the Food Service and Retail Supermarket segments.

=== Bakery products ===
JJSF's bakery products can be found under the Mrs. Goodcookie, Readi-Bake, Country home, Mary B's, Daddy Ray's, and as of August 2017, Labriola, brand names, and under private labels. Bakery products include primarily biscuits, fig and fruit bars, cookies, breads, rolls, crumb, muffins, and donuts. Products are sold either in raw or pre-baked/thaw-and-serve forms in the food service and retail supermarket segments.

=== Frozen beverages ===
JJSF markets frozen beverages primarily under the names Icee, Slush Puppie and Parrot Ice in the United States, Mexico and Canada. Frozen beverages are sold in the Frozen Beverages segment found in food service and retail sectors. Similar to that of the soft pretzel and churro equipment programs, JJSF installs frozen beverage dispensers for its Icee brand at customer locations and thereafter services the machines. JJSF supplies customers with ingredients required for production of the frozen beverages, and supports retail sales efforts with in-store promotions and point-of-sale materials. JJSF also sells frozen non-carbonated beverages under the Slush Puppie and Parrot Ice brands through a distributor network and through its own distribution network. JJSF provides managed service and/or products to approximately 111,000 company-owned and customer-owned dispensers. JJSF also has the rights to market and distribute frozen beverages under the name Icee to the entire continental United States (except for portions of nine states) as well as internationally.

== Notable brands ==
- ICEE
- SuperPretzel
- Dippin' Dots
- Slush Puppie
- Federal Pretzel Baking Company
