= Sloche (band) =

1970s progressive rock band

- Origin: Quebec, Canada
- Genres: Progressive rock, jazz fusion
- Years active: 1970s
- Past members: Rejean Yacola, Martin Murray, Caroll Berard, Pierre Hebert, Gilles Chiasson, Andre Roberge, Gilles Oullet, Richard Drouin

Sloche was a 1970s progressive rock band from Quebec, Canada.

The band's name is derived from the word used in Quebec for wet snow. It is an English word, 'slush,' but it is written to sound the same in French.

== History ==
Sloche was formed in about 1971. The band underwent personnel changes before recording their first album, J'Un Oeil, in 1975. The tracks received some radio play in parts of Quebec.

Their album J'Un Oeil featured Rejean Yacola on electric and acoustic pianos, Fender Rhodes and Wurlitzer electric pianos, Clavinet, Minimoog, percussion, and vocals, Martin Murray on Hammond B3 Organ, Minimoog, Wurlitzer, and Solina pianos, saxophone, percussion, and vocals, Carol Berard on acoustic and electric guitars, percussion, and vocals, Pierre Hébert on bass, percussion and vocals and Gilles Chiasson on drums.

In 1976, the band released their second and final album, Stadaconé; the sound was a mixture of rock and funk.

In 2009, the two albums were remastered and re-released on CDs.

== Discography ==
- J'un Oeil (1975)
- Stadaconé (1976)
