= Deepchill Technologies Inc. =

- Company type: private
- Industry: industrial engineering, Refrigeration technology and manufacturing
- Founded: 1976
- Headquarters: Woodbridge, Ontario, Canada
- Key people: Vladimir Goldstein, President
- Products: Slurry ice Generators, Slurry ice systems and Harvester
- Website: www.deepchill.com

Deepchill Technologies Inc. (previously known as Sunwell Technologies Inc.) registered the world's first slurry ice patent application in the US in 1976. Deepchill pioneered and continued to develop the field of slurry ice and is today the world leader in slurry ice systems, with numerous patents worldwide covering various processes for the production, storage and distribution of slurry ice.

== History and development ==
Deepchill Technologies marketed slurry ice under the trade name Deepchill®. The first slurry ice system was sold in 1978. In the 40 years following, Deepchill concentrated on developing equipment to manipulate and optimize slurry ice, resulting in an adaptable cooling medium called Deepchill^{®} Slurry. Since then, slurry ice has been widely adopted in major fisheries around the world and in the industrial air conditioning industry in Japan. Deepchill now has installations in over 40 countries and is the largest supplier of slurry ice systems and technology. Its head office and main operating facility is currently located in Woodbridge, Ontario (Toronto), Canada. Deepchill also has operating facilities in Osaka, Japan through Sunwell Japan Corporation.

== Products ==
Early pumpable slurry ice system

Many food products require different types of ice during the various stages of processing and storage to optimize quality and freshness. Being able to vary the ice state is important because changing the state of the medium also changes its behavior and allows one to create ideal preservation conditions. A single Variable-State Ice System can deliver ice in a complete range of ice-states to suit any preservation requirement. The ice fraction can be varied from very liquid ice, to a very thick paste and ultimately dry (liquid free) ice crystals. The salt content can be controlled to create salt-free slurry or saltwater slurry of any salt concentration and the size of the crystals in the slurry can be controlled. The most effective state of Deepchill can then be pumped and discharged at different points in a facility. For example, very liquid ice with low ice concentration for rapid pre-chilling, slurry for continued chilling during processing, long-lasting paste with very high ice concentration for temporary or overnight storage, and dry (pure water) crystals for packing.

=== Features ===
The main features of Deepchill^{®} Slurry include:

- Slurry with an ice concentration of up to 70% ice fraction can be transported through standard piping using conventional pumps.
- It has the highest heat transfer or cooling rate of any form of ice.
- It refrigerates evenly without freezing the product.
- The ice particles have no sharp edges to damage the product.
- The ice particles do not bridge or collect into clumps.
- Ice temperature can be controlled and maintained for prolonged periods.

=== Applications ===
Chilling fish with thick Slurry Ice

The following are current users of Deepchill^{®} Slurry Systems:

- Fishing boats (seiners, shrimp boats, trawlers and longliners etc.)
- Industrial ice vendors
- Seafood processing plants
- High-value seafood industries (e.g. sashimi grade tuna)
- Growers and packers of fresh produce
- Construction industries cooling buildings using thermal energy storage
- Beverage cooling industries
- Supermarket refrigeration and displays
- Railway car cooling (for the transport of perishable goods)
- Poultry processing plants
- Deepchill^{®} ice pigging to clean pipes

== See also ==
- Slurry ice
