= Slushy =

Flavored frozen drink

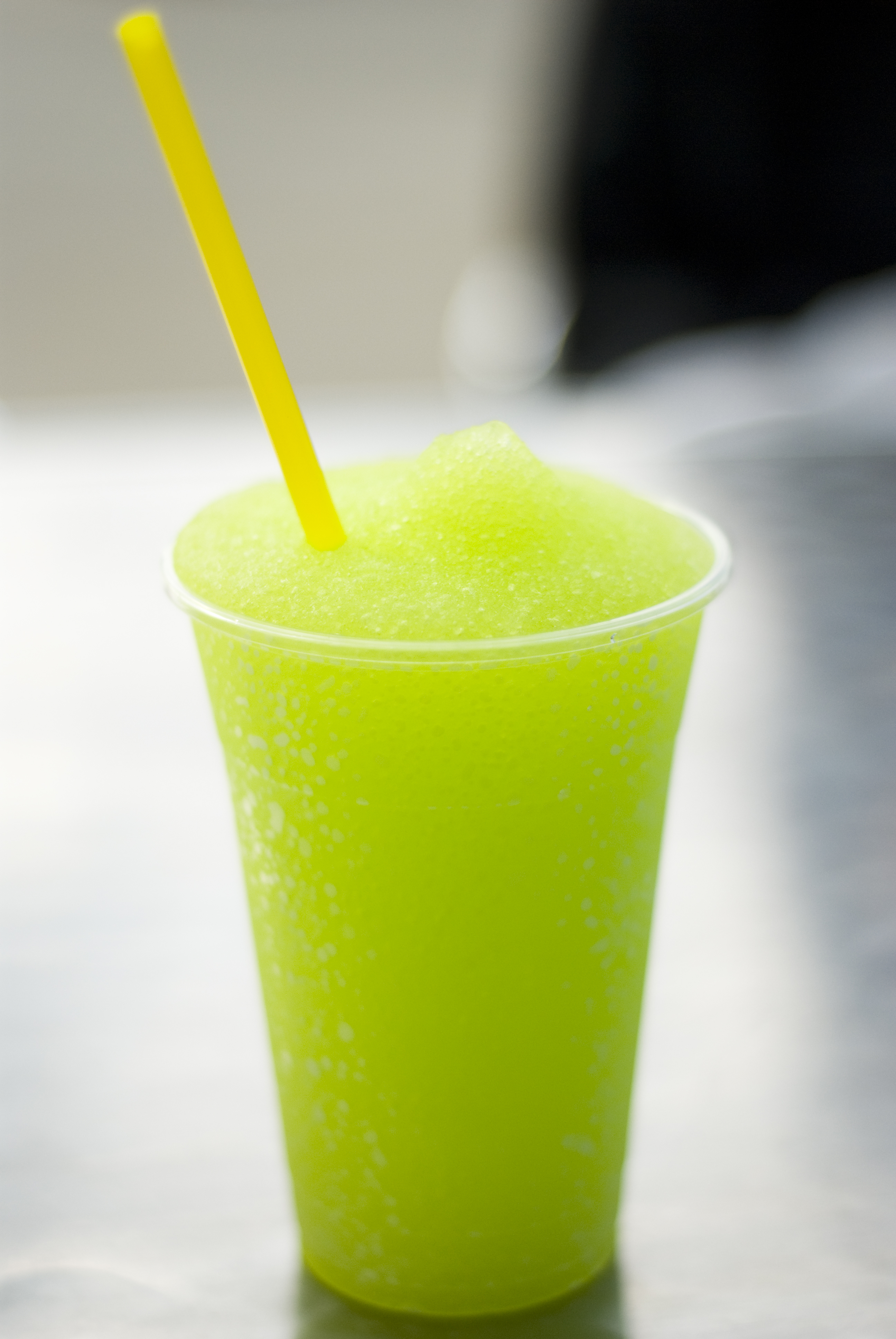
- A lemon-lime flavored slush drink
- Alternative names: Slush, slushie, slushee, slushies, Icee, Slurpee.
- Type: Drink
- Place of origin: United States
- Region or state: Kansas
- Created by: Omar Knedlik
- Invented: 1958
- Variations: Carbonated, non-carbonated, alcoholic

A slushy (also spelled slushie and less commonly slushee) is a type of drink made of flavored ice and a drink, similar to granitas but with a more liquid composition. It is also commonly called a slush, slurpee, or frozen drink. A slushie can either be carbonated or non-carbonated; the carbonated version is sometimes called a frozen carbonated drink.

== History ==
The first carbonated slushie machine was invented by Omar Knedlik, the owner of a Dairy Queen franchise. In the late 1950s, the soda machine at his restaurant experienced constant issues. Sometime in 1958, his machine completely failed and he decided to store his soda in his freezer, where it became slushy when pulled out. He decided to sell the slush to his customers, and the drink soon became popular. Knedlik decided to pursue making slushies and commissioned Ruth Taylor to create the name and logo of the Icee Company. These early machines used an automotive air conditioning system and worked by combining and freezing a flavor mix, water, and carbon dioxide.

In 1960, Knedlik partnered with John Mitchell to mass-produce slushy machines, gaining a patent in 1962. In 1965, 7-Eleven bought 3 ICEE machines and signed a licensing deal with ICEE where 7-Eleven would adopt the Slurpee name for their products and they were restricted to selling the Slurpee in American 7-Eleven stores. By the 1970s, Slurpee machines could be found in every American 7-Eleven store.

== Variations ==
Slushies are either carbonated or non-carbonated. They can also come in a variety of flavors ranging from fruits such as strawberry, watermelon, and pineapples, to sodas such as Coca-Cola, Sprite, and Fanta, and other flavors like caramel, chocolate, vanilla, and even iced coffee. Slushies made using alcoholic drinks are called frozen alcoholic drinks.

== Production ==
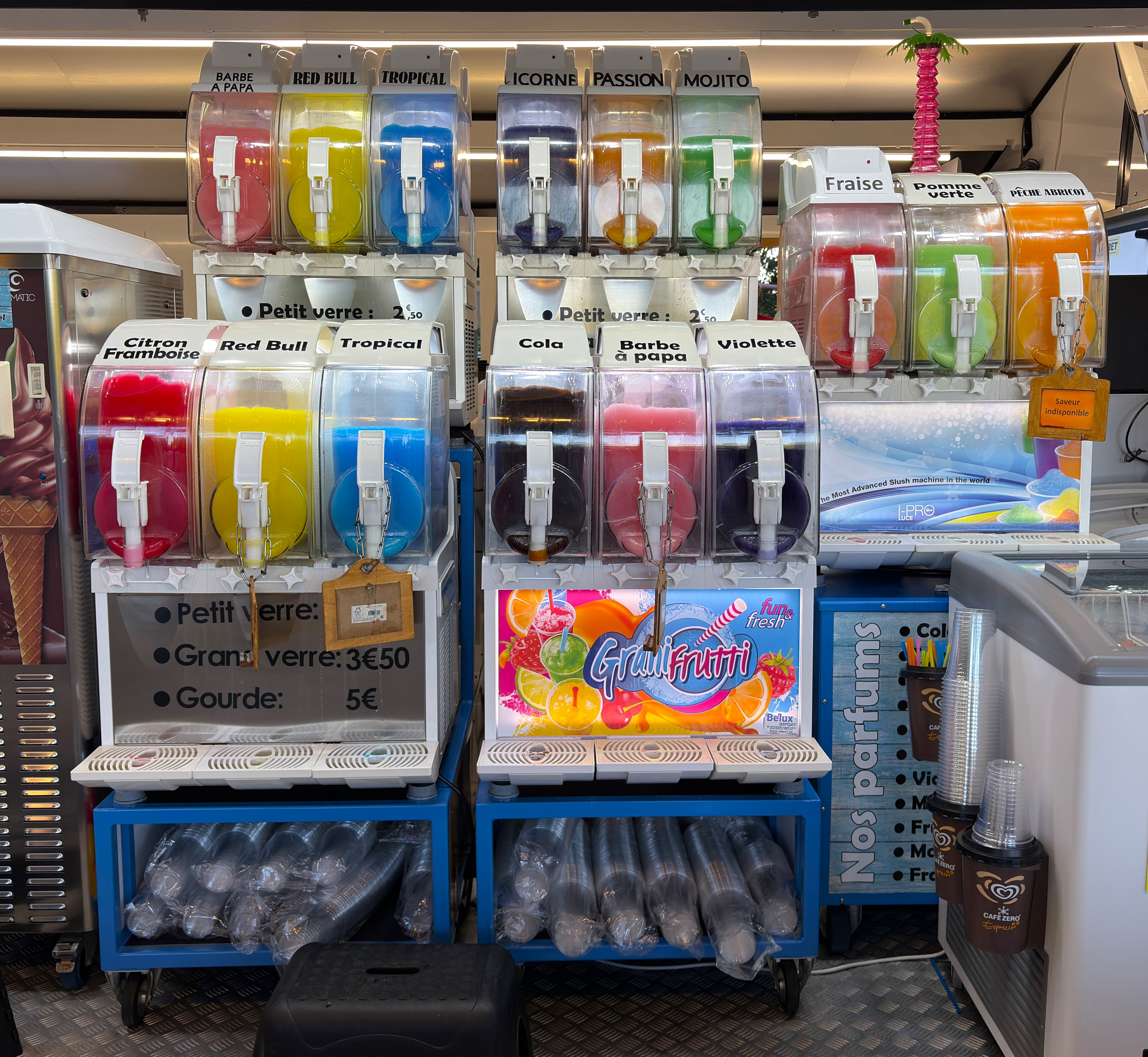
Slush machines in France, containing mixes for a dozen different tastes

Carbonated slushies are made in machines similar to regular soda fountains. Concentrated flavor syrups are mixed with filtered water, then carbonated. This mixture is then injected into a cylinder surrounded by freezer coils. The mixture freezes to the wall of the cylinder, then is scraped off by a rotating dasher, which also keeps the mixture uniformly mixed. Carbonated slushie machines often freeze to a temperature well below the freezing point of water, but the combination of pressure up to 40 psi (2.8 bar), the carbon dioxide mixture that freezes at −80 °C (−112 °F), the sugar, and the constant stirring prevent the mass from freezing solid. Carbonated slushies tend to be "drier" than their non-carbonated counterparts.

Non-carbonated slushies are made by freezing a non-carbonated juice or other liquid. Many modern non-carbonated slushy machines use a spiral-shaped plastic dasher to scrape crystals off a freezing cylinder, often integrated into a clear hopper. This product is often "wetter" than a carbonated slushy machine. Machines for producing these do not require a pressure chamber, and as a result, they are much cheaper and easier to maintain due to their simpler mechanics.

Slushies can also be produced by supercooling. The first slushies in the late 1950s and early 1960s were made by supercooling. Supercooled Sprite was briefly marketed by Coca-Cola in the United Kingdom. The product required a special vending machine to store the bottles in a supercooled state so they would turn to slush upon opening. Supercooled slushies can be made by pouring a soda into a bottle, shaking it and putting it into a freezer, waiting 3 to 3.5 hours, and then either releasing pressure and flipping the bottle, slowly opening the bottle and pouring it out, or adding a piece of ice into the soda.

== Temperature ==
Slush is made by a mixture of sugar and water. To prevent the mixture from freezing solid, there must be 12–22% of sugar present in the solution. The sugar acts as an antifreeze in the solution. The slush machine stirs or rotates the mixture at a constant speed so that the sugar and water molecules bond together before the water gets a chance to freeze. In this way, a soft, wet slurry mixture is formed.

Some slushies have additives to make the freezing temperature of the mix lower, so that the drink can be served much colder than a water slush drink.

== Brands ==
There are several well-known brands of slushies. The brands Slurpee, ICEE, and Froster are known for their carbonated slushes. Brands that produce non-carbonated slushes include Slush Puppie, Kona Ice, and Del's.

In 2007, 7-Eleven sold Slurpees branded as Squishees, a parody of Slurpees from The Simpsons television show which features a 7-Eleven parody brand called Kwik-E-Mart; the temporary defictionalization was to cross-promote with The Simpsons Movie.

== Concerns over glycerol content ==
Some slushies contain glycerol both as a sweetener and to reduce the freezing point of the mixture to retain the slush effect. The use of glycerol in place of sugar allows the drinks to avoid sugar tax, but introduces a risk of glycerol intoxication syndrome in young children. In the United Kingdom, the Food Standards Agency recommends that children under the age of seven do not consume glycerol-containing slushies, that children under the age of ten limit consumption of these drinks to 350ml per day, and that a warning of the risks be visible at the point of sale.

== See also ==
- Cold-stimulus headache
- Freezie
- Granita
- Italian ice
- Milkshake
- Pumpable ice technology
- Shaved ice
- Smoothie
- Snow cone
