= Slush Puppie =

Slush beverage

- Branding for Slush Puppie products
- Type: Subsidiary
- Industry: Food and beverage
- Founded: 1970; 56 years ago
- Founder: Will Radcliff
- Owner: J&J Snack Foods

Slush Puppie (stylized as SLUSH PUPPiE) is a slush beverage created in 1970, and marketed both directly by the Slush Puppie division of J&J Snack Foods, and through its Slush Puppie distributors in the United States and Canada.

A Slush Puppie has two major components; the base and the flavoring. The base is made from a special syrup that is mixed with water and then frozen. This creates a mixture resulting in pellets of ice in liquid. The taste is simply that of the flavored syrup. The brand's mascot is a white puppy wearing a knit hat and a blue shirt with the letter "S."

Because of the glycerol used to prevent slushy drinks from freezing, Slush Puppie beverages may not be suitable for children under age four. In August 2025 the squeeze pouch drink has been recalled in Germany. It exceeds the safe threshold level for Glycerol set by the Federal Institute for Risk Assessment (BfR). Consuming large quantities of Glycerol can lead to headaches, nausea, vomiting, diarrhea, and drowsiness, especially for children.

== History ==
Slush Puppie founder Will Radcliff (1939–2014) decided to start the company after seeing a slush-making machine at a Chicago trade fair in 1970. Radcliff, his sister and their mother came up with the name "Slush Puppie" (based on hush puppy) while sitting on their front porch in Cincinnati, Ohio.

The business started from a home address in Cincinnati and progressed to a single door small warehouse, to a manufacturing plant/warehouse, to a candy and tobacco distributor, to a front door repair shop, to finally a showplace building that overlooks the city of Cincinnati. As the company expanded, Radcliff added additional product lines, including Thelma's frozen lemonade, Pacific Bay Smooth-E, and Lanikai Frozen Cocktails. Under Radcliff, Slush Puppie grew to $25 million in annual sales.

Radcliff sold Slush Puppie to Cadbury Schweppes for $16.6 million in 2000. Slush Puppie was then acquired by J & J Snack Foods, a food manufacturer based in Pennsauken Township, New Jersey, on May 30, 2006.

== Licensing ==
Slush Puppie currently holds the naming rights to two ice hockey arenas in Canada, the Centre Slush Puppie in Gatineau, Quebec, and Slush Puppie Place in Kingston, Ontario since 2022 and 2024 respectively.

== List of international operations ==
=== United Kingdom ===
In 1974, Slush Puppie was launched in the United Kingdom when businessman Ralph Peters bought three Slush Puppie machines. The Slush Puppie license continued to be held in the United Kingdom by the Peters family for decades, and was later joined by the Frutina brand. In December 2019, it was announced that the UK license with the Peters family (now known as Frozen Brothers) would be terminated. In June 2021, the UK license for Slush Puppie was awarded to Vimto Out of Home. In November 2024, the Slush Puppie license was then changed to Celtic Frozen Drinks.

Spin-offs of Slush Puppie sold in UK retail outlets, such as a home slush machine, have been sold by Fizz Creations since 2017. A freezeable pouch version was introduced by Manchester Drinks in July 2018. In 2021, Rose Confectionary began making various Slush Puppie candy assortments. In March 2023, a soft-drink version called Slush Puppie Fizzie was launched by Nichols plc. There are other items produced, such as ice lollies, teacakes and milkshake powder by CRC Innovations. There are also air freshers and air sprays available by RTC Direct.

== Gallery ==
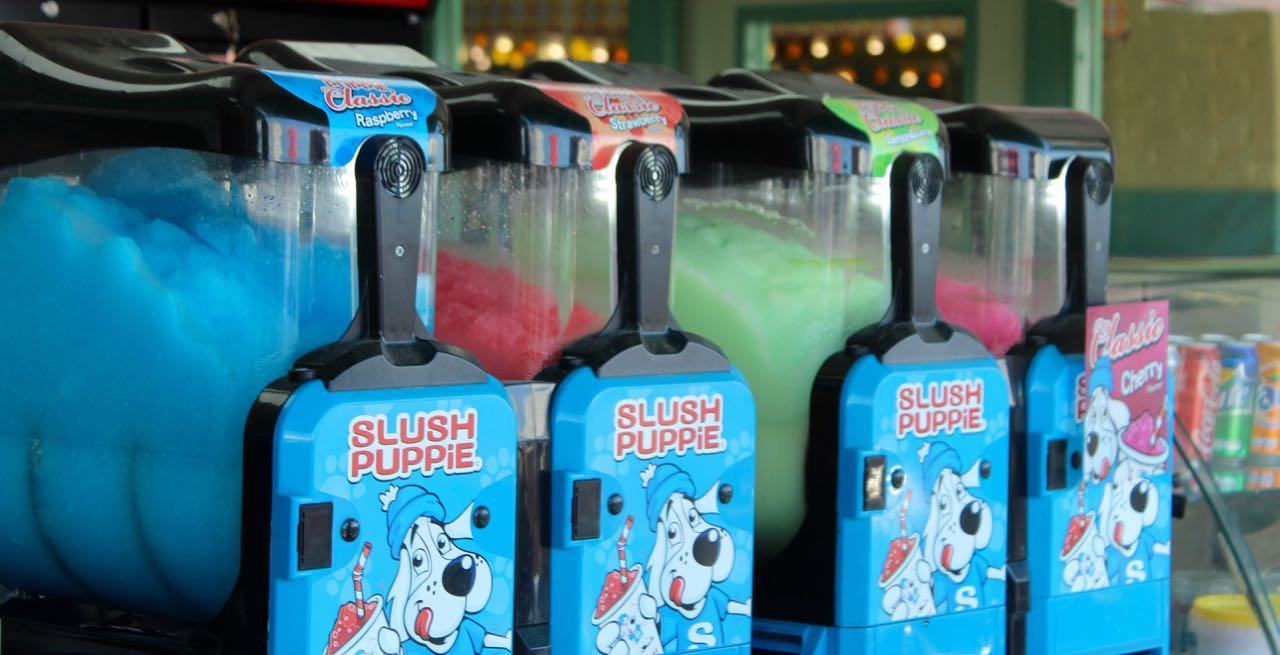
Slush Puppie machines.

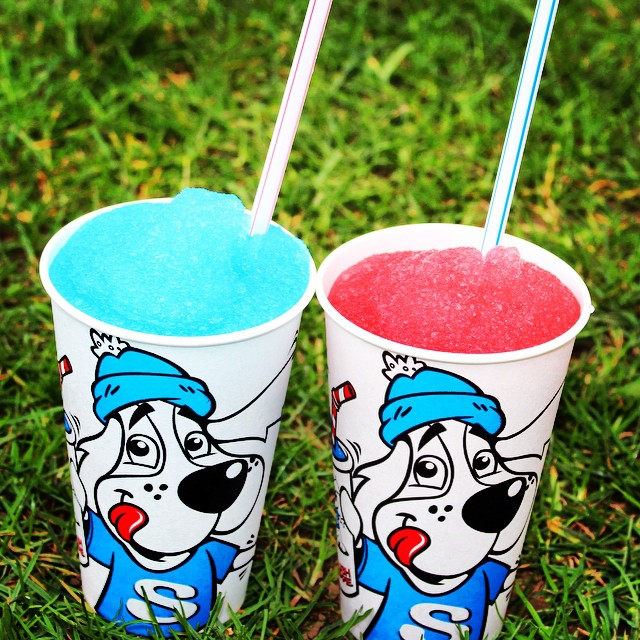
Slush Puppie cups.

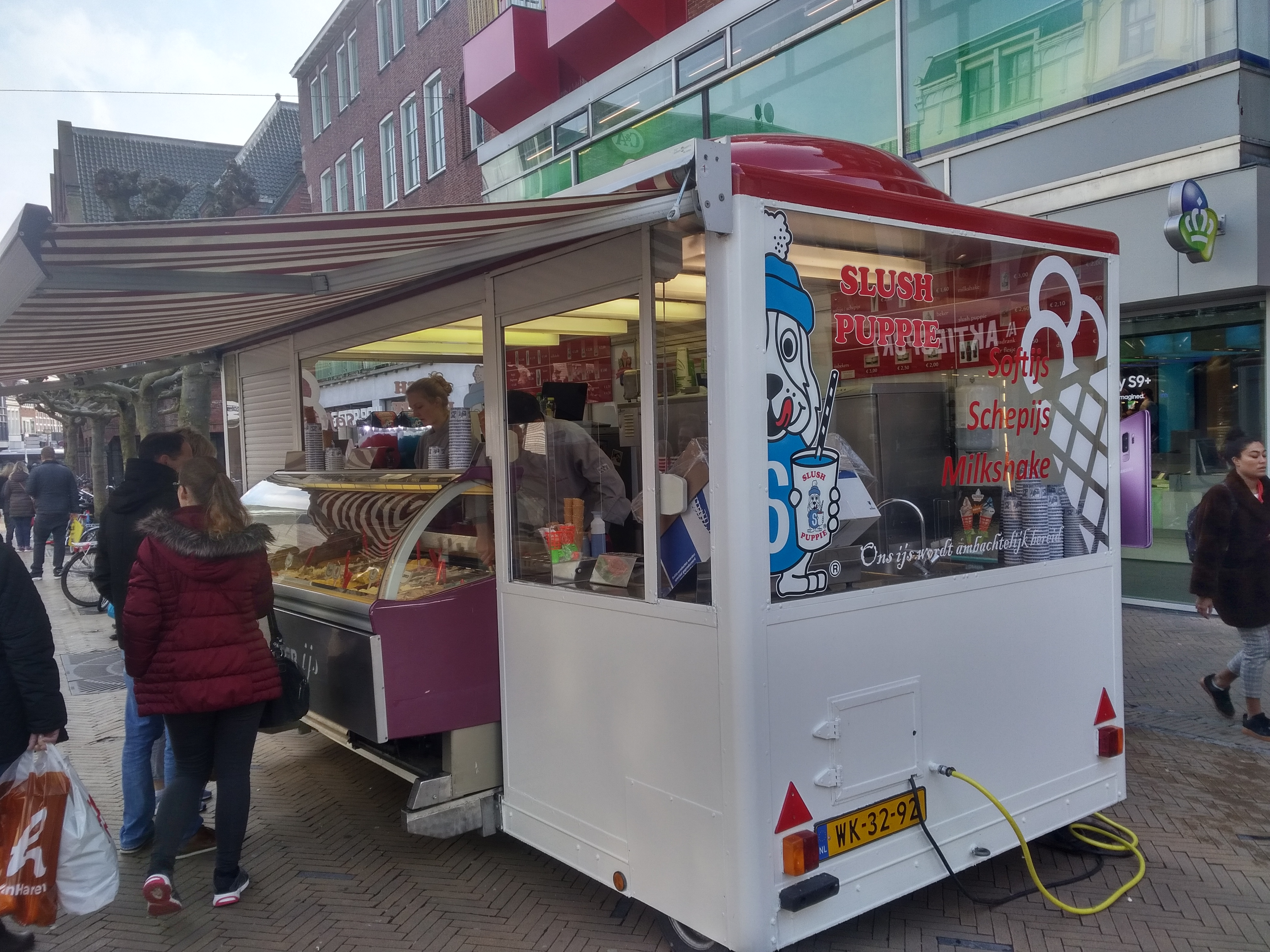
Food truck selling Slush Puppie in Groningen.
