= Omar Knedlik =

American businessman

Omar Knedlik

Omar S. Knedlik (December 21, 1916 – March 14, 1989) was an American inventor and businessman. He was best known as the inventor of the ICEE frozen drink. He was born and raised a poor farm boy in Barnes, Kansas, in 1916. Knedlik was a World War II veteran who bought his first ice cream shop after the war. He owned several hotels before moving to Coffeyville, Kansas, where he became the owner of a Dairy Queen in the late-1950s. It was at this Dairy Queen that he developed the Icee machine. Knedlik did not have a soda fountain, so he served semi-frozen bottled soft drinks. He found that they were immensely popular, so he worked with a Dallas company to develop the ICEE machine. It took him five years to replicate the consistency in slushy soft drinks. In the mid-1960s, the first ICEE machines were sold in the United States.

In 1966, 7-Eleven bought some of the machines, calling its version the Slurpee. Knedlik received royalties for about 17 years until his patent expired. He moved his family from Coffeyville to Joplin, Missouri, in 1983, when Knedlik developed kidney problems and needed dialysis. He died, aged 72, in 1989.
