= Presto (UK supermarket) =

Former British supermarket chain

Presto Food Markets Limited
- Industry: Grocery, General merchandise
- Founded: 1964
- Defunct: 1998
- Fate: Stores converted to Safeway
- Successor: Safeway (UK)
- Headquarters: Hayes, Greater London
- Parent: Safeway (UK) (Formerly Argyll Stores Ltd)

Presto Foodmarkets was a chain of supermarkets and convenience stores in Great Britain, which first appeared in the early 1960s. While the fate of most of the chain's stores was conversion to Safeway, the final stores still trading as Presto were either closed or sold in 1998.

== History ==
=== Early years ===
The company was established in 1967, opening stores the north of England and in Scotland in the early 1960s where its primary base remained but for some years Presto did have a nationwide presence. According to the Institute of Grocery Distribution the name derives from the town of Prestonpans, the location in which the first Presto store was opened. A store also opened around the same time in the Preston Grange Estate in Preston, Tyne and Wear.

Presto was a division of Allied Suppliers, owned by Europe's third biggest food company Cavenham Foods, which also operated 500 Lipton supermarkets in England and Wales as well as the brands Galbraith and R & J Templeton with around 85 supermarkets in Scotland. Presto as a brand was greatly expanded under Cavenham's ownership and became the most significant brand, operating primarily large supermarkets and superstores throughout the country. In 1979 it purchased the south east based chain Cater Brothers and incorporated them into the Presto brand.

=== Acquisition by Argyll Foods ===
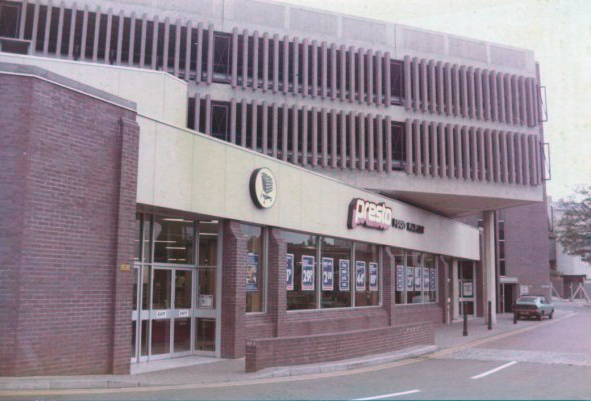
Presto Food Market, Cheltenham, 1982

In 1982, Presto and its 136 stores, together with the rest of Allied Suppliers was sold to Argyll Foods for £101 million. Argyll operated the Lo-cost supermarkets and Cordon Bleu Freezer Centres.

=== The brand relaunch ===
The old Liptons, Galbraith, Templeton and Presto logos

In 1985, Argyll began a major re-organisation of its food store division. In Scotland and Northern England, the Hintons, Lipton, Galbraith and Templeton stores were either rebranded as Presto stores or closed. For some time, Hintons' direct marketing magazine "Going Shopping" continued with the Presto name including the headline "Presto - Our Heart's in the North". Liptons stores in the rest of England and Wales were either closed or converted to Presto (larger stores) or Lo-Cost (smaller stores). Argyll also launched a new slogan in 1985 moving from "for the best, best go to Presto" to "You'll be impressed in Presto".

To complement the new slogan, a new logo was also launched featuring yellow, blue and red as well as, for a short time, a shopping basket. The new logo was used on all converted stores while original Presto stores retained the old logo on their exterior signage throughout their life. A number of new Presto Superstores were also opened featuring the new logo. In 1986, the conversion programme was complete and Argyll was set for expansion and new Presto regional distribution centres in Bristol, Wakefield, Bathgate and Welwyn Garden City were planned.

=== Initial conversion to Safeway ===
In 1987, Argyll Foods purchased the UK operations of Safeway, which resulted in seven Presto stores (including Farnham, Morden and Chandlers Wharf, Stockton-on-Tees) being converted to Safeway on a trial basis. In 1988 a further 57 Presto stores (including the store at Sedgley, West Midlands, which had opened only a year earlier) had been converted to Safeway.

While most (but not all) of the Presto stores were converted to Safeway during this period, the smaller stores located in Scotland and the north of England continued to trade as Presto.

=== Revival of Presto ===
The first new Presto store to open since 1987 opened in Kirkwall in 1991. This was shortly followed by another new store in Lockerbie.

In March 1993, Argyll split its retail operations into two divisions, Safeway Stores, and Presto and Lo-Cost Stores. Super Marketing reported that Sir Alistair Grant stated in a memo, "The creation of Presto and Lo-Cost divisions is an important move which signifies our commitment to these important businesses and our wish that their direction and management should be given a strong specific focus."

In 1993, Argyll also acquired four supermarkets from Norco in Scotland. Three of these stores were converted to Presto (in Banchory, Ellon, and Westhill) and one larger store (Elgin) was converted to Safeway.

More new stores opened over the next couple of years as well as replacements for existing Presto stores such as the new build Presto store at Springfield in Stokesley, North Yorkshire which replaced an older former Hintons location.

=== Disappearance ===
In 1994, 150 smaller Presto stores, including many former Lipton's branches, were sold to convenience operator, Spar.

A former Presto store in Cornhill, Aberdeen. The tiles behind the counter are a clear remnant of the store's Presto era

In 1996 Argyll announced it was changing its name to Safeway and would be converting the remaining 110 Presto stores to Safeway. While Presto branded products, and even carrier bags, were quickly replaced with Safeway, the conversion of the stores was not complete until mid-1998 when the final Presto (mainly smaller) stores which were not to be converted to Safeway were sold on to other retailers including Spar.
