= Galbraith supermarkets =

Galbraith and Sons Ltd
- Industry: Grocery, General merchandise
- Founded: 1894
- Founder: William Galbraith
- Defunct: 1987
- Fate: Acquired
- Successor: Home and Colonial Stores
- Headquarters: Paisley, Scotland, UK

Galbraith and Sons was a retailing company based in Paisley, Scotland. The company grew to over 220 stores, establishing their own food production plants to supply their stores. Galbraith's were acquired in 1954 by Home and Colonial, becoming part of the Allied Suppliers Group. Galbraith's survived as one of the Scottish trading names for Allied Suppliers until 1987, when it disappeared as part of the Argyll Supermarkets re-branding to Safeway Stores.

== History ==
=== Stores ===
Galbraith's Stores first shop was established in Linwood Village, Paisley in 1894. Within 6 years the company had 12 stores and had expanded to over 59 shops by 1919. To minimise capital outlay, the stores (usually located in Tenement Blocks) were rented, designed in a uniform style and had narrow shop frontages. The store network grew rapidly; by 1939, the company had over 159 grocery branches and 12 butchers shops. Along with a "provisions" window, staple items such as tea, sugar and bakery goods were advertised with an emphasis on price. By the time of the sale to Home and Colonial, the store network had expanded to over 220 stores and was regarded as the leading independent grocery business in the west of Scotland.

=== Distribution ===
The stores were originally served by a single warehouse in Paisley. As the store network grew, a second warehouse was added in Glasgow, closely followed by a third in Govan, Glasgow.

=== Manufacturing ===
Manufacturing was a key success to their growth. By owning their manufacturing, the company increased the profitability and secured supplies to their stores. The company established a bakery in 1895 at George Street, Paisley to supply their own stores following a dispute with their former supplier, J and J Swann. By 1911, a second bakery was added in Govan to supply the Glasgow branches. Meat production was established at the George Street warehouse in 1896 when two ham curers were employed, closely followed by sausage making. Galbraith’s was one of few retailers to purchase and blend their tea directly. Preserve and pickle manufacturing commenced in 1918 after a dispute with James Robertson.

=== Acquisition ===
The company was acquired in 1954 by Home and Colonial Stores for £2,340,000.00, becoming a principal Scottish subsidiary of the Allied Suppliers network. Under Allied Suppliers, the bakery and pickle factory were quickly sold to their respective management. By 1956, the sausage and cooked meats factory was transferred to the Richmond Sausage Company, becoming their major regional Scottish factory. Allied Suppliers’ preserve manufacturing was concentrated at Galbraith's Paisley premises.

=== Trading name ===
The company was formed as Galbraith and Sons Limited in 1894. After becoming a trading subsidiary of Argyll Supermarkets, it existed under the name Galbraith's Stores Limited until 1987.
