= Wright's Biscuits =

British biscuit manufacturer and grocery retailer

- Founded: 1790 (public company in 1936)
- Defunct: 1973
- Headquarters: South Shields, Tyne and Wear
- Area served: United Kingdom
- Key people: William Webster; James Goldsmith
- Parent: Cavenham Foods 1971-72; United Biscuits 1972-73
- Divisions: Wright's Biscuits; R. Middlemas & Sons; Golden Crunch; Medibix; Kemp Biscuits; Wright's Cakes; Moores Stores

Wright's Biscuits was established in 1790 as L Wright & Son, in South Shields. In the 1930s they implemented intensive factory methods for production and became a national supplier of biscuits and cakes, and a leading employer in Tyne and Wear. They also ran a large chain of grocery stores under various names, and controlled fellow grocery chain Moores Stores. The business became part of James Goldsmith's Cavenham Foods group in 1971.

== History of Wright's Biscuits ==
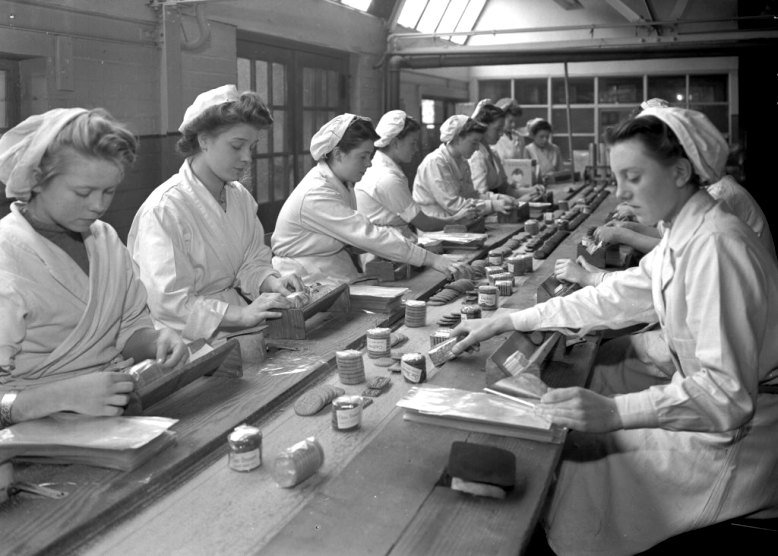
Production line with women workers at Wright's Biscuits c.1940s

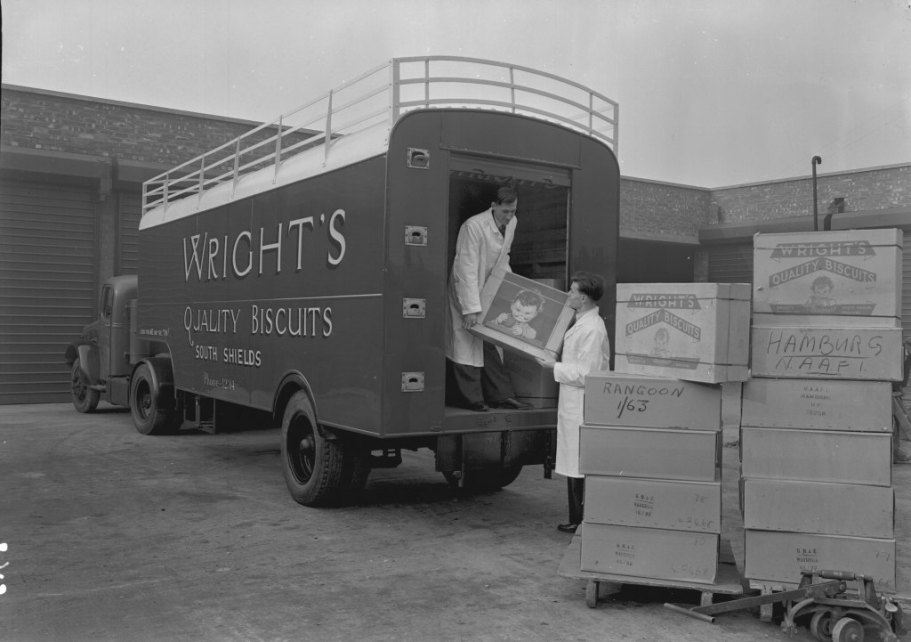
Packing Wright's Biscuits destined for Rangoon and Hamburg c.1940s

Wright's Biscuits was established in 1790 at Holborn in South Shields to produce ship's biscuits.

After a fire in 1898, completely new buildings were created at Tyne Dock. In 1933, Willie Webster became a director of the company with Frederick Cross, and the business name changed from L Wright & Son to Wright's Biscuits Ltd. It became a public company in 1936. At the first AGM, the company was described as "commenced from nothing only four years ago". During this period Wright's installed modern ovens and equipment to produce biscuits on an industrial scale.

The Second World War saw day and night production for the Army. Around 300 employees, mostly women, worked shifts around the clock. After the war, in 1946, Wright's purchased the Golden Crunch Biscuit Company and Medibix from the Edinburgh-based R. Middlemas & Son, in which Wright's purchased a large shareholding three years later in 1949.

In 1958, Wright's raised more capital by issuing new preference shares and purchased the 180 grocery store chain of James Duckworth. James Duckworth had opened its first store in 1868, and had a warehouse and offices in Oldham. This was followed up in 1959 by purchasing the Portsmouth-based chain of 49 grocery stores of W Pink & Sons. Pinks were one of the claimants to the origins of HP Sauce.

In 1960, Wrights purchased the remaining shares in R. Middlemass & Co, while growing the retail business with the purchases of the Leeds-based grocery chain Gallon, which had 184 branches, and Thomas & Evans, the 88-store South Wales based grocery business of the Beecham Group. A year later they purchased the Leeds-based grocery business of S. Driver and completed a 24 store exchange deal with rival brand Melias, gaining stores in the Hull area for those in North Wales owned by Gallon. During Webster's Christmas address, he expressed his worries about the state of the grocery trade,

The food trade has never been more competitive than it is today. Many goods are sold to the housewife at prices which do not cover handling and distribution costs, and in my opinion profit margins are at a dangerously low level

In 1962 J Lyons took control of the Wright's Cakes factory in Birkenhead with Wright's Biscuits considering national van sales of cakes to no longer be sufficiently profitable. In the same year Wright's Biscuits bought Kemp Biscuits from Scribbans-Kemp, while adding the grocery business of W Morton & Sons. Kemps, who factory was based at Great Coates, had previously been looked at by both Cavenham Foods and Lyons. In 1963 the company announced record year in both turnover and profits. By 1965, Wright's grocery business had over 750 branches, which 140 had been converted to self-service and 11 supermarkets. However by 1966, the growth of Wright's Biscuits and its sister firm Moores was hampered due to the losses incurred at Kemp Biscuits Ltd. In 1969, Webster set up the William Webster Welfare Fund, for the relief of poor incapacitated or necessitous employees or former employees of Wright's Biscuits Limited. Wright's financial performance struggled in 1969, with the company planning to close more of its loss making stores and replace them with supermarkets as part of its turn around plan. As part of its plan, the company sold the former Middlemass factory in Edinburgh. The turn around plan included opening supermarkets under the company's various brands including Peglers Stores and James Duckworth.

On 22 September 1971, it was announced that Cavenham Foods had purchased Willie Webster and his wife's 41% shareholding in Wright's Biscuits, which owned a 42% shareholding in Moores Stores. This, together with the Wright's own personal shares in Moores gave Cavenham 47% of the stock. Wright's and Webster's shares in Moores were "A" shares which had double voting power. The price of 36p a share valued the shareholdings at £6.5 million, which was less than the market value; however Wright's and Moores had both struggled. Wright's Biscuits had predicted losses of £500,000, while Moores Stores had seen profits tumble from over £1 million to £560,000 since 1968. Three of Wright's independent directors stated that the company lacked the financial resources to make it viable economically again, while Cavenham believed it would cost £2 million to reorganise Wright's and Moores. Goldsmith offered 45p a share to the rest of the remaining stock owners in both companies, however this was below the market price of 82p. Moores Stores operated around 685 grocery stores under both their own name and those of subsidiaries like Hay & Co, while in addition to its biscuit manufacturing, Wright's operated a further 488 grocery stores under brands like Gowers & Burgon in Sheffield. However Cavenham's bid was met with hostility from shareholders, led by Liverpool accountant John C. Malthouse, as the company's assets were worth at least 110p a share compared to Cavenham's 45p offer. By November Wright's had announced losses of £1.23 million, far greater than previously predicted, but Cavenham did not withdraw its interest, and in December they formally released their offer to the shareholders, offering ordinary shares in Cavenham. Cavenham completed the purchase of the remaining shares against hostile shareholders at a total cost of £10 million in shares.

In 1972, United Biscuits took over Wright's Biscuits, its subsidiary Kemp Biscuits, along with fellow biscuit manufacturer Carr's of Carlisle from the Cavenham Foods, who retained the grocery business. In October 1972, Wright's Biscuits was put into administration with the South Shields factory finally closing in 1973. The former Kemp Biscuits factory at Great Coates was retained by United Biscuits, finally closing in 1995.

== Mabel Lucie Attwell Wright's Biscuits branding ==
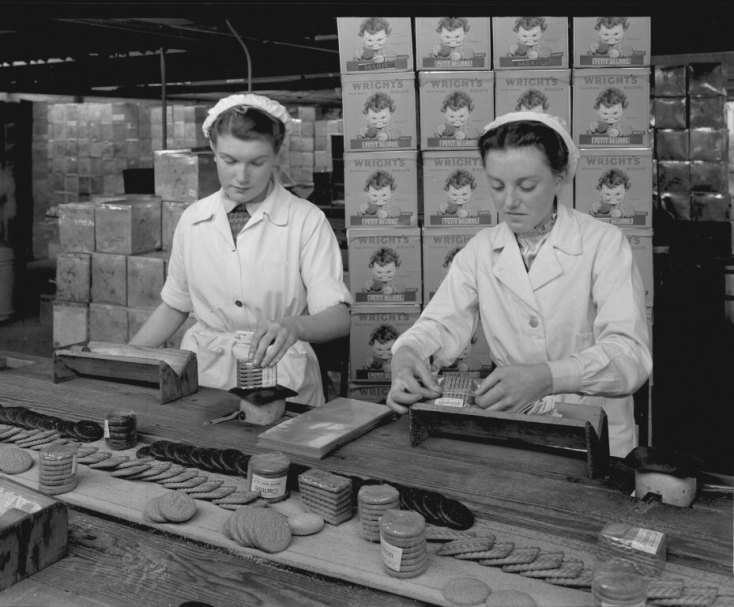
Women working in Wright's Biscuits factory with boxes behind displaying Attwell's Mischief design

Children's illustrator Mabel Lucie Attwell was employed by William Webster in the 1930s to create the Wright's logo, a curly-haired boy called Mischief. There was a Mischief Club for children, with members getting a collectable badge.

== Moores Stores ==
Moores Stores
- Founded: 1907 (public company in 1935)
- Defunct: 1971
- Headquarters: Tyne and Wear
- Area served: United Kingdom
- Key people: William Webster; James Goldsmith

Moores Stores was started as a single grocery store by William Moore in 1907. In 1935, the company was made public and had grown to 114 stores based in the North East. The company continued to grow before and after the war by purchasing smaller grocery business so by the early 1950s it had grown to nearly 600 shops trading under their original names, including Frank Farrands, Binyons, John Kay (Kays Modern Food Stores) and T . Seymour Mead to name a few. It was at the time the third largest grocery company behind Home and Colonial and International Tea Co. Stores. It was during the 1950s that Wright's Biscuits bought their shareholding in the business, with William Webster becoming Moores chairman. In 1958, the total net assets of Wright's Biscuits were about the same as Moores Stores at around £2.5 million.

The 24 Tyneside grocery business of Hanlons was added in 1960, along with the 87 strong Nottingham chain of J D Marsden. In 1961, Moores added the East of Scotland grocery business of James Walker & Sons, with their further 14 stores added to their 18 Hay & Co stores based in Edinburgh. The company continued to expand during 1962, purchasing the 45 store Southend on Sea based grocery chain of H. Garon (founded in 1880), and the 175 store Yorkshire chain of Thrift Stores, while they purchased 102 stores of Mence Smith, the ironmongers, from owner Timothy Whites. Of the 102 Mence Smith stores purchased only 36 were converted to grocery stores, with the rest leased or sold off to generate funds, while H. Garon's bakery and two of its buildings were sold to raise £791,000. The company had nearly 1,000 branches at this time, however only 125 were self service and five of these were supermarkets at this time. William Webster told the annual AGM that he was "bitterly against the high costs of acquiring supermarket sites" and that "supermarket enthusiasts are in danger of over-reaching themselves". He stated that between Wright's and Moores they would be planning no more than 30 big supermarkets.

During 1963 it was announced that Moores subsidiary H. Garon, along with Debenhams and British Rail had agreed to develop a site in the High Street, Southend, for a department store, a supermarket, two other stores and an office block. The company grew by purchasing further grocery stores, including chains John Favers and A.E. Smith from Scribbans-Kemp, the 13 branches of George Barr and Bells (Cash Grocers). In 1966, Webster stated

Modernisation of warehouses and distribution centres has proceeded steadily over the past two years, while it is planned to speed up expansion into supermarkets and larger self-service stores, a considerable number will open in the later half of 1967 or early 1968. The closure of small counter service branches and the conversion of others to self-service will continue. In the year end April 1, 1967, 129 branches were closed and 44 converted. At the year end, the group had 663 counter shops and 337 self-service or supermarkets.

These included new supermarkets opening in Ripley and Whitley Bay and the purchase of the 21 store south east based grocery chain of Cave Austin and Company from Burton, Son and Sanders of Ipswich. In 1968, Moores Stores were listed at number 402 in The Times 500 Leading Companies in Britain and Overseas, but the company announced a drop in profits and stated that government policies would see food prices rise. By 1970, Moores was still one of the four largest grocery groups in the United Kingdom, and by 1971 the company had seen a 34% up turn in business.

== Cavenham-Southland ==
Cavenham-Southland
- Founded: 1971
- Defunct: 1976
- Headquarters: United Kingdom
- Area served: United Kingdom
- Key people: Jim Wood; James Goldsmith
- Parent: Cavenham Foods (50.1%) & Southland Corporation (49.9%)
- Divisions: Moores Stores; Wright's Retail Grocers

The stores of Wright's and Moores Stores were sold to a new company, Cavenham-Southland shortly after the takeover. It was part of the Southland Corporation (owners of 7-Eleven) deal previously brokered by John Tigrett for Cavenham's newsagent business, with Southland owning 49.9% and Cavenham owning the remaining 50.1%. As part of the deal Southland paid $10.35 million. Cavenham appointed their retail chief, Jim Wood to the board, who had turned around their newsagent chain. He stayed with the company until he joined the Grand Union supermarket chain in the United States after Cavenham's purchase in 1974. The new company continued the programme of reorganisation started prior to the takeover, closing and selling off stores and distribution centres. Moores' Scottish stores, which operated under the Hay & Co brand were transferred to Allied Suppliers by Cavenham, after that company's purchase in 1972, to add to their existing Scottish portfolio of stores. By 1973, the company had 729 stores against a total of 1,173 it had at the time of the takeover, and the combined Wright's/Moores group of stores had made £2 million in profits. The number of stores had reduced to 624 stores by 1976, with most having been renamed under the Moores Stores brand, except for the larger discount stores which were branded under the Tower name.

In December 1976, Cavenham purchased the 49.8% of Cavenham-Southland from the Southland Corporation that it didn't own, and renamed the company Moores-Wright's, but it did not stay as a separate business for long, as it was merged into Cavenham's other grocery subsidiary Allied Suppliers during 1977.

== Wright's and Moores Stores grocery operating names ==
Wright's Biscuits and Moores Stores operated under a variety of grocery store operating names:

- Abbey Stores (F. H. Whaley & Sons)
- Alex Robb & Co
- E. H. Askew
- George Barr
- Bells (Cash Grocers)
- Binyons
- George Briscoe
- Buckley Jones
- Burgess Stores
- Burgons
- Cairns Stores
- Cave Austin & Co
- Consumer Tea Company
- Frank Farrands
- Gallon
- H. Garon
- E. Gower & Sons
- Hanlons
- Harman & Ely
- Hay & Co
- James Duckworth
- James Walker & Sons
- J D Marsden
- John Kay (Kays Modern Food Stores)
- John Rowntree & Sons
- Kemp Stores
- Metcalfe Stores
- Moores Stores
- Peglers Stores
- Phillips Stores
- Pricedown
- R. C. Hopkinson
- Savemore
- S. C. Moss
- S. Drive
- S. Wills & Sons Ltd
- T. Seymour Mead
- Thrift Stores
- Thomas & Evans
- Thompsons The Grocers
- Tower Discount
- United Kingdom Tea Company
- W Morton & Sons
- W. G. Moss
- W Pink & Sons
- Woodcock & Co
- W. Robinson (Otley)

== The South Shields factory re-opening ==
The factory was reopened in 1975 under the ownership of F.C. Lowe's for the production of dog biscuits. This stayed open until 1983. After the closure the factory and the chimney, a landmark for the Tyne and Wear Dock area, were demolished.

== See also ==
- Newcastle University - Wright's Biscuits, South Shields (1790-1973)
