= Marine Villa =

Coordinates: 50.6388°N 1.1706°W

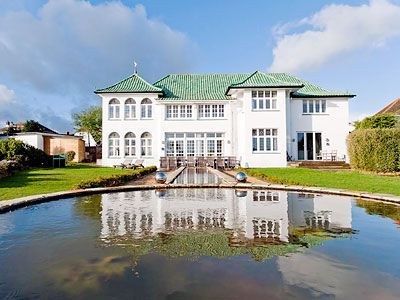
Marine Villa

Marine Villa (also known as Greentiles and Villa Judapa) is an Art-Deco house located on the clifftop in Shanklin Isle of Wight and is famous locally on the Island but little known beyond its shores. It was known originally as "Green Tiles" and was commissioned by the Cater family from London, and was designed by local architect Ernest L Smith to take advantage of the vistas across Sandown Bay. The house was built in 1929 and takes full advantage of its cliff-top location, and is probably one of the Isle of Wight’s most distinctive properties. All main living and bedrooms have large windows topped by stained glass detail, framing the vistas. Art-Deco influences include an upstairs sun room with huge sliding picture windows. In 1933, Clara Cater died, and the house was sold.

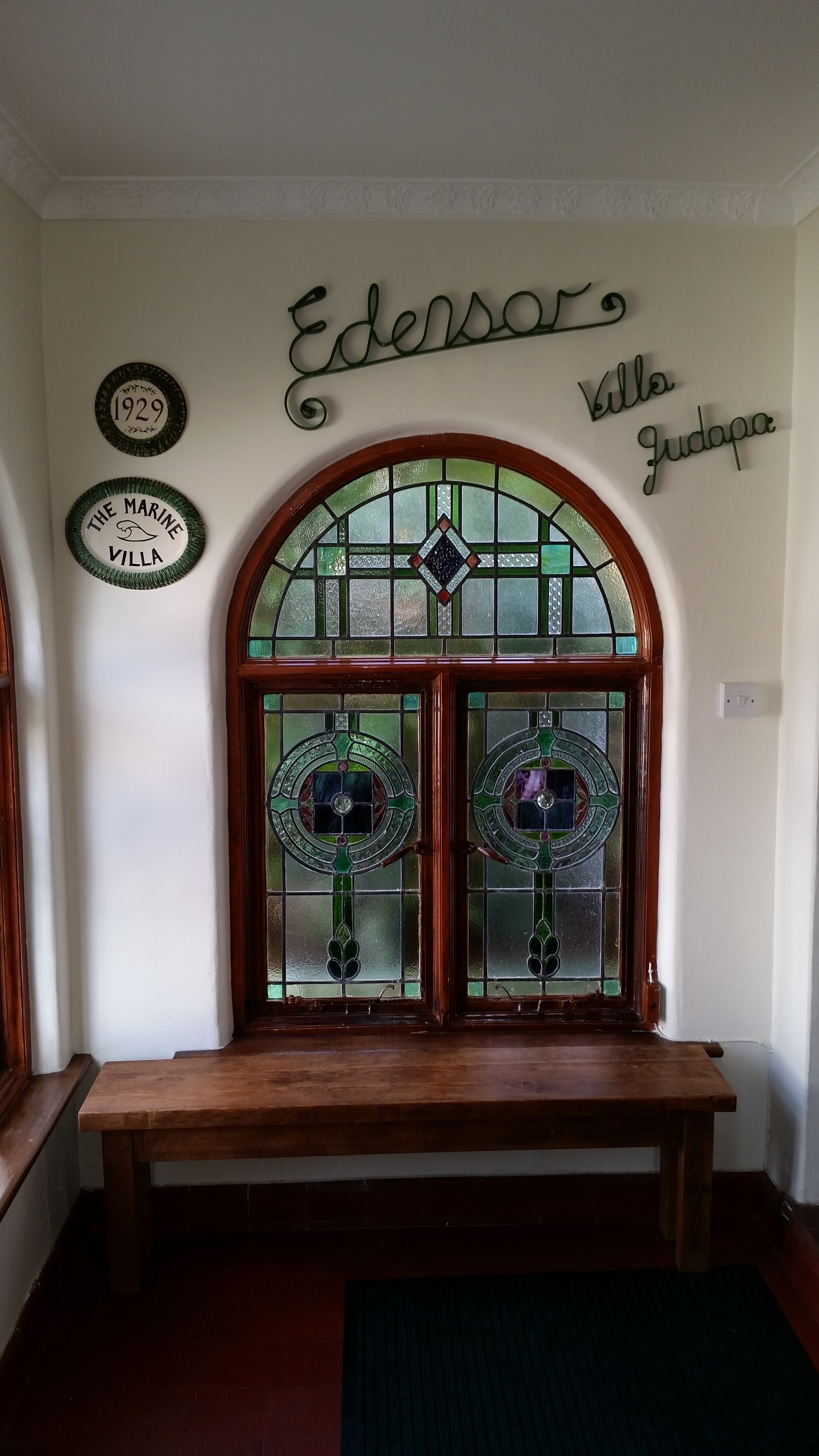
Original signage c. 1933 Marine Villa, Isle of Wight

It would appear that the most influential owners of the House, were the colourful local characters Horace Terry Wood and his wife Sadie Terry Wood, who purchased the house and lived and partied there for many years. They were responsible for installing the distinctive Art Deco pond and garden design, as these did not previously exist as evidenced by the 1933 particulars of sale. Sadie also installed on brick patio on the lawn facing the sea, two statues of the Great Dane dogs she had been raised with.

Wood owned the Shanklin Brewery, several hotels on the island (including the Holliers), and, most significantly Shanklin Pier, housing Shanklin Casino and concert theatre which hosted many evening entertainment events. It is documented in several books that Terry Woods hosted many after-show parties at their home, entertaining stars of the time such as Arthur Askey, Jimmy Tarbuck and Tommy Trinder. The house had an art deco bar installed, made of glass bricks illuminated by coloured lights.

During their tenure they renamed the house Villa Judapa. It is not clear when the house was renamed Marine Villa.
