= James Gulliver =

British businessman (1930–1996)

James Gerald Gulliver (17 August 1930 – 12 September 1996) was the founder of Argyll Foods, one of the United Kingdom's largest retail businesses.

== Career ==
He was born in Campbeltown, Scotland, the son of successful grocer William Frederick Gulliver and Mary (née Lafferty). He was educated at Campbeltown Grammar School then studied at University of Glasgow and Georgia Institute of Technology. Gulliver served for three years in the Royal Navy before joining Urwick Orr & Partners, management consultants. In 1965 he joined Fine Fare where he became chairman within two years.

In 1977, together with Alistair Grant, a marketing specialist who he had worked with at Fine Fare, and David Webster, a merchant banker, he founded James Gulliver Associates. In September 1978, he bought the meat company belonging to Manchester United chairman Louis Edwards for £100,000 plus shares and renamed it Argyll Foods, acquiring numerous retail concerns including 130 Safeway outlets. Within 10 years of the purchase, the company was worth £1.7 billion. Gulliver also bought 100,000 of Edwards' shares in Manchester United for £250,000 and was given a seat on the club's board of directors (although fellow director and former manager Matt Busby abstained from the vote to give Gulliver a seat, saying he did not know who Gulliver was). Gulliver later became the club's vice-president. He sold his stake in 1986, but retained two seats in the directors' box at the club's Old Trafford ground. He was also the vice-chairman of Heart of Midlothian.

In 1985, he tried unsuccessfully to acquire Distillers but lost the bidding to Guinness. He retired from the business later that year.

In 1990, he was elected a Fellow of the Royal Society of Edinburgh. His proposers were Hugh Sutherland, Ronald Roberts, Sir Kenneth Alexander and Sir Monty Finniston.

He was awarded the CVO in 1995 for his services to the Duke of Edinburgh's Award Scheme.

== Personal life and death ==
He was married four times: to Margaret Joan Cormack (1958), Joanne Simms (1977), Marjorie H. Moncrieff (1985) and lastly Melanie Crossley (1993). He had five children with his first wife.

Gulliver died in Edinburgh in 1996.
