= Lipton =

Brand of tea

- Product type: Tea
- Current owner: PepsiCo and Lipton Teas and Infusions.
- Country: United Kingdom
- Introduced: 1871; 155 years ago (Lipton grocery); 1890; 136 years ago
- Markets: Worldwide
- Previous owners: Unilever
- Website: lipton.com

Lipton is a British brand owned by PepsiCo and Lipton Teas and Infusions. It derives from its founder, Sir Thomas Lipton, who started a grocery retail business in the United Kingdom in 1871. The brand was used for various consumer goods sold in Lipton stores, including tea from 1890, for which Lipton is now best known.

The brand was purchased in 2022 by CVC Capital Partners from Unilever. Unilever retained use of the Lipton brand for tea in India, Nepal, Indonesia, and Sri Lanka as well as for ready to drink beverages globally, such as Lipton Iced Tea, which are sold by a joint venture between Unilever and PepsiCo, and not associated with Lipton Teas and Infusions. Unilever also reserved the right to produce Lipton branded instant soup mixes in North America.

== History ==
=== Origins ===
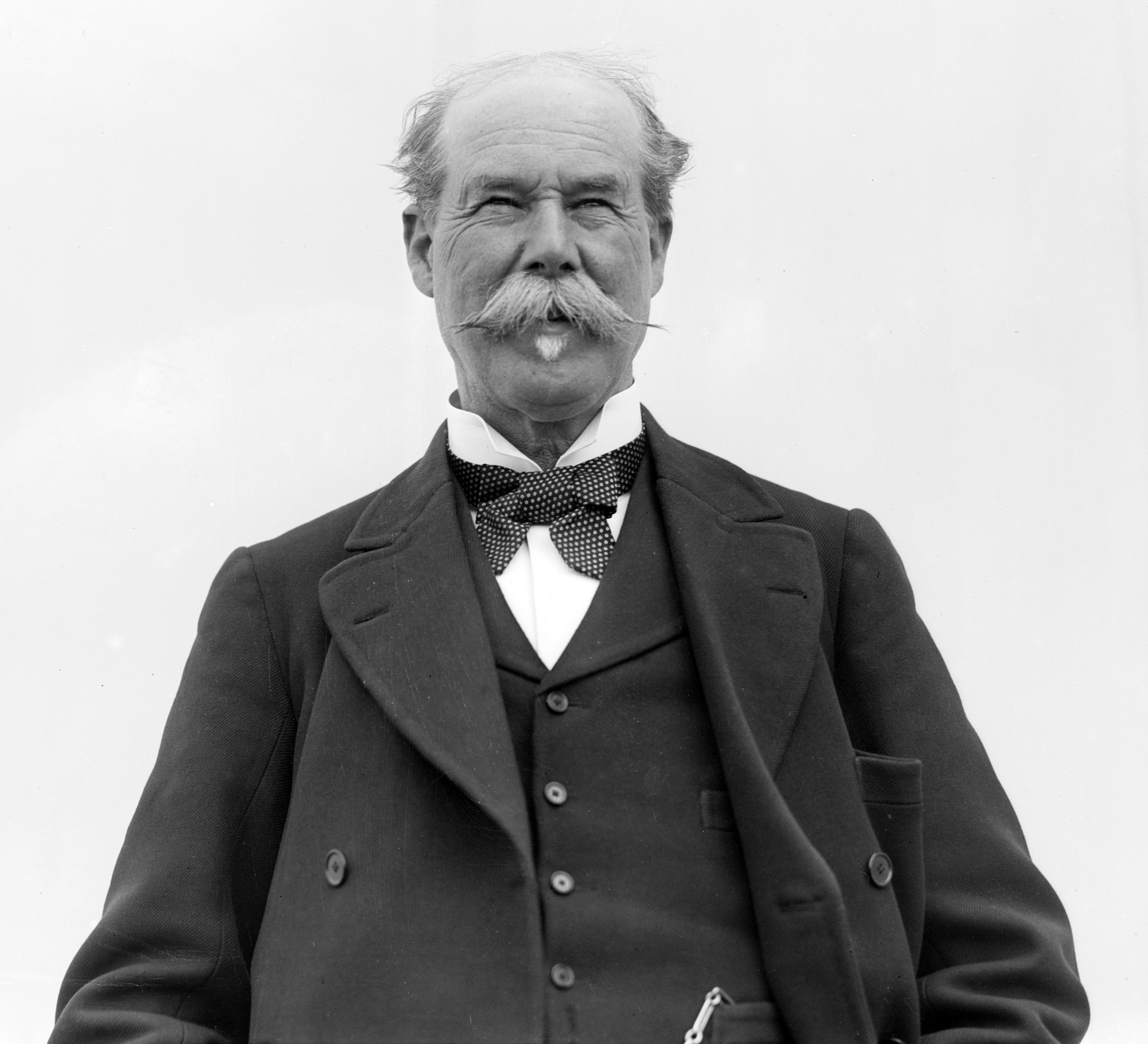
Thomas Lipton

In 1871, Thomas Lipton (1848–1931) of Glasgow, Scotland, used his small savings to open a shop; by the 1880s the business had grown to more than 200 stores. In 1929, the Lipton grocery retail business was one of the companies that merged with Home and Colonial Stores, Maypole Dairy Company, Vyes & Boroughs, Templetons and Galbraiths & Pearks to form a food group with more than 3,000 shops. The group traded in the High Street under various names, but was registered on the UK stock market as Allied Suppliers; Allied Stores was originally formed in 1929 to act as the group's purchasing arm. Lipton's became a supermarket chain focused on small towns. Allied was acquired by Argyll Foods in 1982; the supermarket business was rebranded as Presto during the 1980s.

=== Development ===
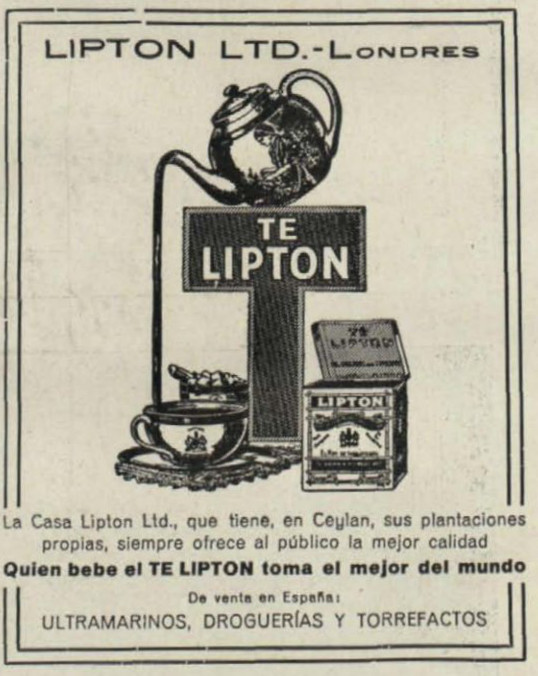
Lipton advertisement from Spain, 1926

After opening his shop Thomas Lipton began travelling the world for new items to stock. Tea, historically a rare and expensive luxury, doubled in sales from £40 million in the late 1870s to £80 million by the mid-1880s. In 1890 Lipton purchased tea gardens in Ceylon, now Sri Lanka, from where he packaged and sold the first Lipton tea. He arranged packaging and shipping at low cost, and sold his tea in packets by the pound (454g), half-pound (227g), and quarter-pound (113g), with the advertising slogan: "Direct from the tea gardens to the teapot." Lipton teas were an immediate success in the United States.

The Lipton tea business was acquired by consumer goods company Unilever in a number of separate transactions, starting with the purchase of the United States and Canadian Lipton business in 1938. The company owned 12% of the Lipton holding company, Allied Suppliers, a retail holding company, but had 33.7% of the voting rights. In 1972, Unilever sold its shares in Allied Supplies to Sir James Goldsmith's Cavenham Foods group for £10.4 million, on the understanding they could buy Lipton's tea business back at a price agree by an independent adjucator. The fee set was £18.5 million which Unilever completed the purchase of in August 1972.

In 1991, Unilever created a joint venture with PepsiCo, the Pepsi Lipton Tea Partnership (PLTP), for the marketing of ready to drink teas in North America. This was followed in 2003 by a second joint venture, Pepsi Lipton International (PLI), covering many non-North American markets. PLI was expanded in September 2007 to include a number of large European and other markets. PepsiCo and Unilever each control 50 percent of the shares of these joint ventures.

Former logo used from March 2014 to 21 May 2025. It is still used on Unilever and PepsiCo's Lipton Ice Tea joint-venture products.

In May 2007, Unilever became the first company to commit to sourcing all tea in a sustainable manner. Working with the Rainforest Alliance, an international environmental NGO, Unilever, announced all Lipton Yellow Label tea bags sold in Western Europe would be certified by 2010 and all Lipton tea bags sold globally by 2015. Lipton's own tea estates were among the first to be certified. Lipton tea bearing the Rainforest Alliance seal appeared on Western European markets in 2008 and started appearing in North America in 2009. On 6 May 2009, Lipton received a Corporate Green Globe Award for its work with the Rainforest Alliance.

In 2011, PETA criticized Unilever for conducting and funding experiments on rabbits, pigs and other animals in an attempt to make human health claims about the tea's ingredients. According to the animal rights organization, Unilever decided to end the practice after receiving more than 40,000 appeals from PETA supporters and days before PETA made plans to launch its "Lipton CruelTEA" campaign. Unilever no longer tests their products on animals unless required to by governments as part of their regulatory requirements.

Unilever reached an agreement in November 2021 to sell the majority of its tea business to private equity firm CVC Capital Partners for €4.5 billion. This included the Lipton brand except where Unilever retained its use for tea in India, Nepal, and Indonesia, for ready to drink teas globally, and for soup mixes in North America. The sale was completed in July 2022, with the new company named ‘Lipton Teas and Infusions’.

Due to the Russian invasion of Ukraine, Lipton Teas and Infusions decided in August 2022 to completely withdraw from the Russian market and stop the production and sale of Lipton tea.

== Today ==
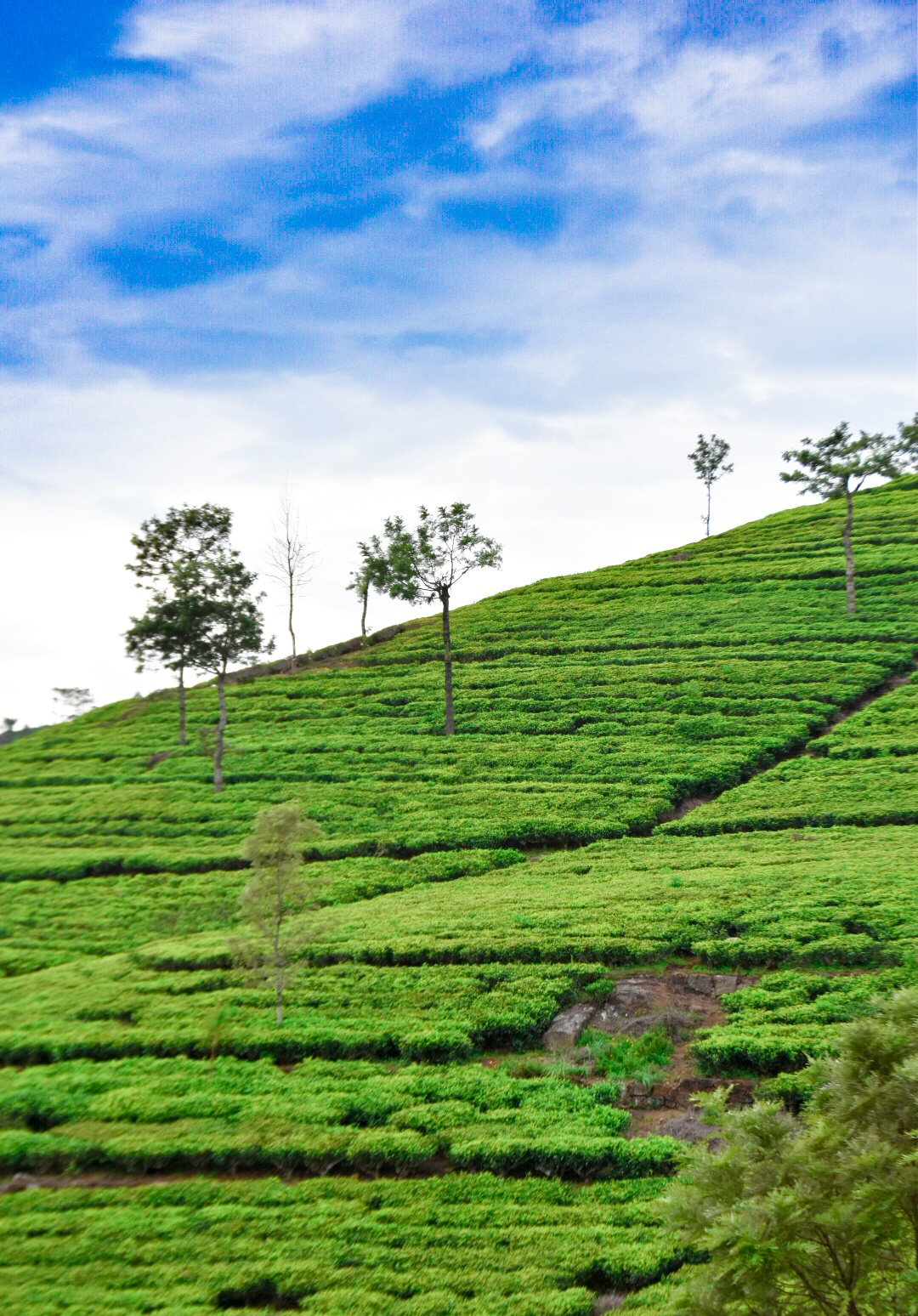
Dambatenne Tea Factory, Thomas Lipton's first tea plantation located in Badulla, Uva Province, Sri Lanka

Lipton tea is available in over 150 countries, and particularly popular in Europe, North America, Africa and the Middle East, parts of Asia and Australasia (Australia and New Zealand), as well as Latin America, and the Caribbean. Despite its British origins, Lipton tea (such as Lipton Yellow Label) is not marketed in the United Kingdom, where brand owner Lipton Teas and Infusions sells PG Tips. Lipton Ice Tea, from the Unilever PepsiCo joint venture, is available in the United Kingdom.

Lipton tea blends are selected from many different plantations around the world, from well-known producing countries, including Sri Lanka, India, Kenya, and China. Apart from the usual black leaf tea, the brand offers many other varieties, including green leaf teas, flavoured black teas, herbal teas, and milk tea in various Asian markets.

The Lipton Tea Innovation & Technology Academy was launched by Lipton Teas and Infusions together with the Government of Kenya and the University of Kabianga in February 2024 to offer training varying from vocational courses to advanced degrees in tea growing and harvesting.

In May 2024, Lipton Teas and Infusions announced an agreement to sell its tea estates in Kenya, Tanzania, and Rwanda to Browns Investments with the proceeds reinvested into East Africa’s tea industry.

== Brands ==
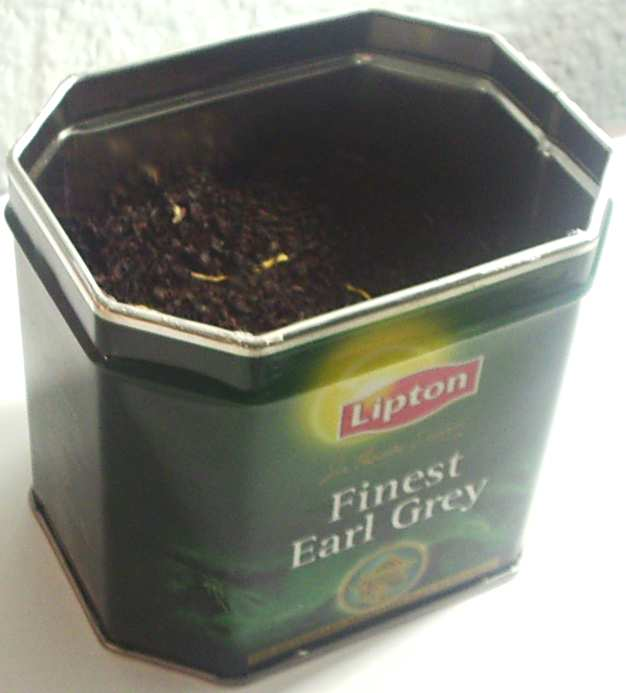
A tin of loose Earl Grey tea

The Lipton brand is nowadays used for three types of consumer goods: tea (tea bags, loose tea, tea concentrates and tea powders), ready to drink tea (bottles and cans), and soup mixes.

=== Lipton Yellow Label ===
Lipton Yellow Label tea has been sold since 1890, when Sir Thomas Lipton introduced the first version of the yellow pack with a red Lipton shield that is still in use today. It is sold in 150 countries worldwide. Lipton Yellow Label is a blend of several types of tea, sold both in tea bags and as loose tea, rolled into small leaves like gunpowder green tea.

=== Lipton Cold Infused ===
A range of specially formulated teas that infuse in cold water. Also variously described as "cold brew" or "real iced tea".

=== Lipton Iced Tea ===

Lipton Iced Tea or Lipton Ice Tea a ready to drink tea brand made and distributed by the joint ventures between Unilever and PepsiCo. It is typically sold in five flavours, lemon, peach, mint & lime, mango, and raspberry. Citrus, watermelon, and mixed berry flavours are also available in some regions.

=== Lipton Brisk ===
Brisk, formerly Lipton Brisk, is a ready to drink iced tea brand made and distributed primarily in North America by the joint venture between Unilever and PepsiCo. It differs from other iced tea brands in that phosphoric acid is added to the blend as a preservative, giving the beverage a distinctive sharp flavour.

=== Pure Leaf ===
Pure Leaf is an iced tea brand distributed primarily in the Americas by the PepsiCo-Lipton joint venture. Unlike Lipton Iced Tea and Brisk, which use a freeze-dried instant tea powder, Pure Leaf is brewed in liquid. The brand is sold in square bottles made of recyclable PET plastic.

=== Lipton Fusions ===
Lipton Fusions are a brand of lemonade-iced tea canned beverages.

In April 28, 2025, Lipton Teas and Infusions created what's known as Lipton Fusions. They come in the following flavors:

- Strawberry Lemonade
- Pineapple Mango Lemonade
- Passion Fruit Lemonade

Lipton Teas and Infusions and PepsiCo states, confirms and markets this as "50% less sugar than regular sodas".

=== Soup mixes ===
Lipton ran an advertisement campaign promoting French onion dip prepared at home using Lipton's French onion soup mix, thus helping to popularize chips and dip. Hundreds of new commercially produced varieties of dips were later introduced in the U.S.

== Marketing and advertising ==
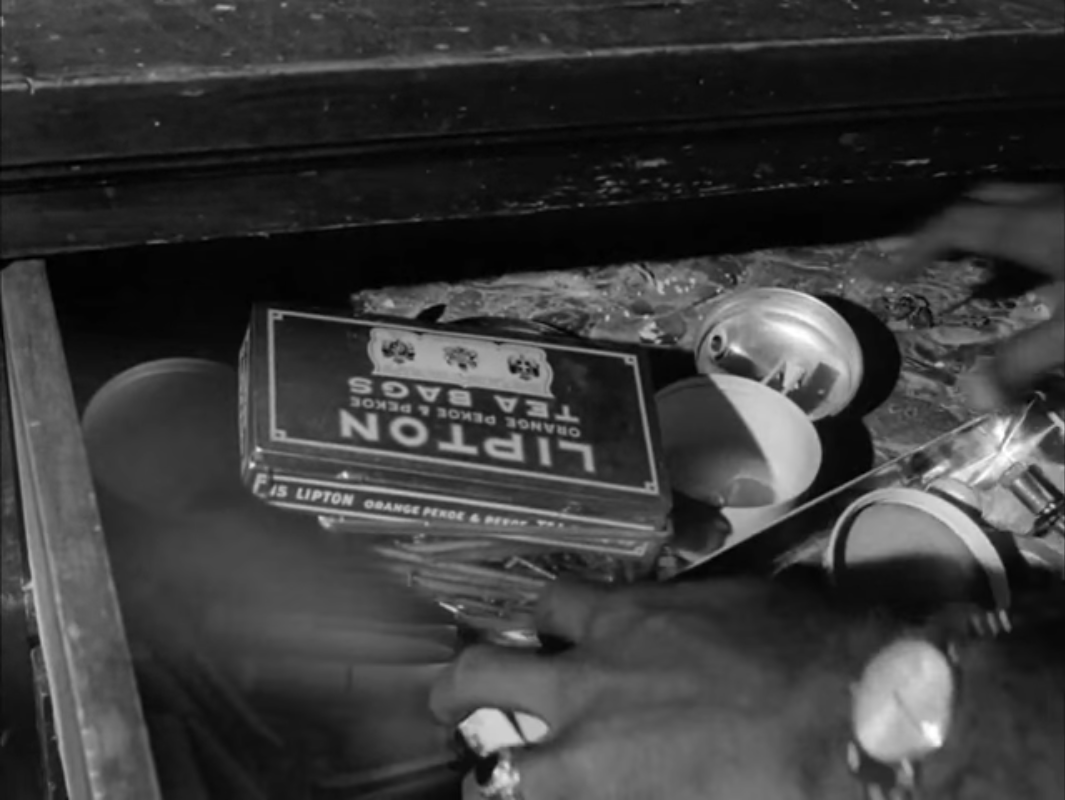
A Lipton tin was used as a prop in the popular horror film Night of the Living Dead (1968)

In 1914, Lipton's tea was one of the sponsors for the first flight from Melbourne, Australia to Sydney, Australia by French aviator Maurice Guillaux, at the time the longest air mail and air freight flight in the world. Sponsor Lipton printed 250,000 copies of a letter Guillaux wrote saying "I found it the most delicious tea I have ever tasted. ... I found it very soothing to the nerves", and these could be had by sending Lipton a one-penny stamp. For a threepenny stamp, Lipton would send out a quarter-pound pack of tea.

In an attempt to change the negative perception of iced tea in the United Kingdom – as 60% claimed they did not like the taste before even trying it – the Unilever PepsiCo joint venture carried out a London-based marketing campaign in 2010 under the slogan "Don't knock it 'til you’ve tried it!"; roaming demonstrators handed out 498,968 samples over the 58-day run. After the campaign, 87% of consumers claimed to enjoy Lipton Ice Tea, while 73% said they were more likely to purchase in the future. A similar campaign, with slogan "Let's Go!", was carried out in mid-2017. Lipton also made commercials starring the Muppets for the 2014 The Walt Disney Company film Muppets Most Wanted.

== Product quality controversy ==
During the 2008 Chinese milk scandal, Unilever recalled its Lipton milk tea powder in Hong Kong and Macau, after the company's internal checks found traces of melamine in the powder.

In November 2011, the General Administration of Quality Supervision, Inspection and Quarantine of China found high levels of pesticides such as bifenthrin in one variety of Lipton tea. Unilever responded by clearing the shelves of all affected products. In April 2012, Greenpeace raised further questions about Lipton products in China, after two varieties of Lipton tea the group purchased in Beijing supermarkets failed safety tests, with the results allegedly failing to meet the regulations enforced in the European Union. The group also stated, "Some of the detected pesticides are also banned for use in tea production by the Chinese Ministry of Agriculture." Unilever China denied the findings, stating all Lipton products within the country were safe.

== Lipton's Seat ==
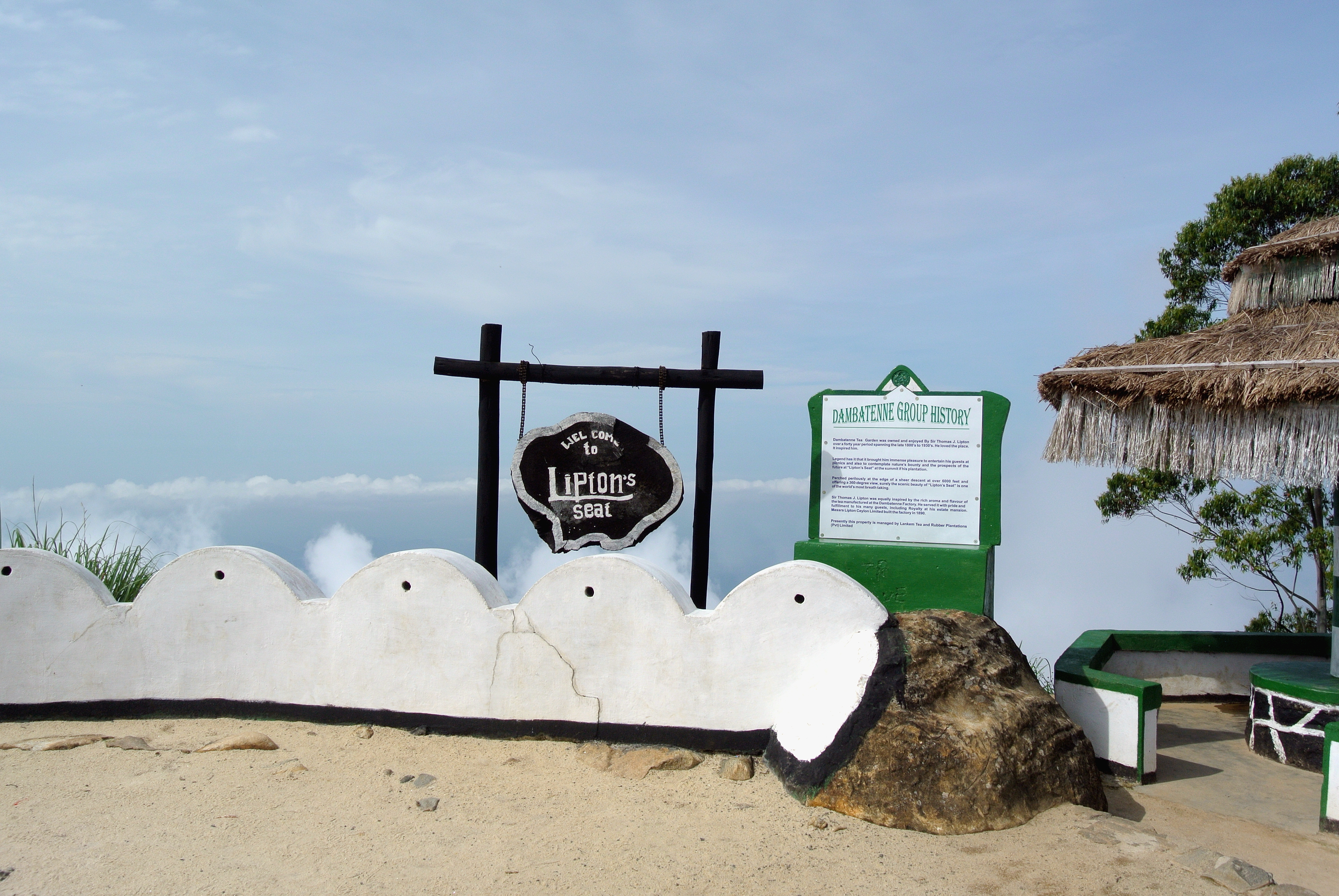
At the summit of Lipton's Seat, a wooden sign, and an old bronze statue of Sir Thomas Lipton

Lipton's Seat is a high observation point in the hills of Poonagala, Bandarawela, Sri Lanka, near Thomas Lipton's first tea plantation, the Dambatenne Tea Factory. It is reached by climbing for around 8 km, surrounded by tea plantations. From Lipton's Seat the Uva, Sabaragamuywa and Central province spread out from before one's feet in a display rivalling that of another famed Sri Lankan observation point, World's End, Sri Lanka within the Horton Plains National Park in the Nuwara Eliya District.

== See also ==
- Lipton Teas and Infusions
- Brooke Bond
- PG Tips
- Lipton Institute of Tea
- Cup-a-Soup
