= Northern Co-operative Society =

Former retail co-operative in Scotland

Aberdeen is Scotland's 3rd largest city

Northern Co-operative Society Limited (abbreviated to Norco), previously named Northern Co-operative Company Limited, was a local consumer co-operative trading in Aberdeen, Scotland, from 1861 to 1993. It operated supermarkets and other businesses throughout Aberdeenshire, and employed 2000 people in 1992.

It was put into the hands of a receiver for liquidation in 1993, as a result of financial difficulties that The Guardian newspaper attributed to "an over-ambitious building and development programme" and failed attempts to dispose of the entire business as a going concern, despite the successful sale of its dairy, five pharmacies, and then several supermarkets to Argyll Stores and the Co-operative Wholesale Society (CWS).

== History ==
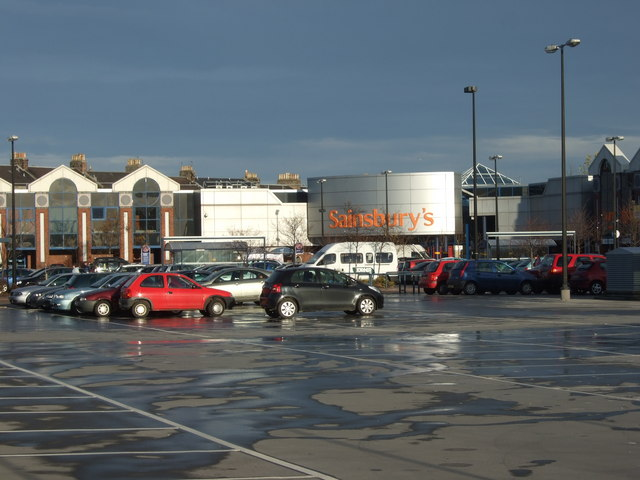
Scottish Co-op sold Norco's Berryden superstore to J Sainsbury, still as a going concern, in 2000.

Norco was formed in 1861 as Northern Co-operative Company, by two committees of Aberdeen residents who planned to follow the example of the Rochdale Equitable Pioneers Society. The first shop was a grocery business at 51 Gallowgate, opened in July that year. The original company had a fixed capital of £1000, but in 1917, it converted into Northern Co-operative Society.

The Society's headquarters were in a large building on Loch Street, which contained the company's offices as well as an arcade-style shopping area. It was described in 2000 as "like Convent Garden (sic) – a delightful, quaint area at the centre of the city where people could stroll" by Connie Leith, head of the Ferryhill Heritage Society.

Norco House, a large department store which replaced the Loch Street building, was opened in George Street in 1970, less than 100 feet from the original building. The trading name of Norco was soon adopted by the entire co-operative. The "space-age" four storey Norco House department store was later bought, refurbished and operated by the John Lewis employee-owned chain. The old Loch Street building remained empty and slowly deteriorated until its eventual demolition in 1986.

In 1977, Norco opened a 54,000 square feet (5,000 m^{2}) flagship superstore in the Berryden district of Aberdeen. The Berryden store was sold to the Scottish Co-op in 1993 immediately before the receivership, and operated by that co-operative for seven years.

In April 1992, Norco declared a loss of £7 million, and the chief executive, Robin Pollock, resigned. Emergency measures included a massive sell-off of businesses, and a pay freeze. Kennerty Dairies (since bought by Robert Wiseman Dairies) bought Norco's Berryden dairy, and Argyll Group bought supermarkets in Banchory, Elgin, Ellon and Westhill. Finally, in 1993, Norco approached Scottish Co-op with a view to a rescue merger, but the latter organization declined the request.

== Operations and co-operative movement ==
Norco was previously noted as the only large consumer co-operative in the UK not to be a member of the Scottish or English Co-operative Wholesale Societies.

It employed 2000 people in 1992, when the financial problems became apparent, and on going into receivership in June 1993, it had 800 employees.

Its trading area included the Aberdeenshire and Moray towns of Banchory, Elgin, Ellon, Kemnay, Inverurie, Port Elphinstone and Westhill. At its peak it had branches and departments throughout the city of Aberdeen. Since the demise of Norco, the tradition of consumer co-operation in Aberdeenshire has been continued or revived by three southern organizations: Scotmid Co-operative, Lothian, Borders & Angus Co-operative and Scottish Co-op (a retail division of CWS, now the Co-operative Group.)
