= Argyll Foods =

1977–1996 British supermarket operator

- The old Liptons, Galbraith, Templeton and Presto logos
- Type: Public
- Industry: Retail
- Founded: 1977
- Defunct: 1996
- Fate: Name changed to Safeway
- Successor: Safeway (UK)
- Headquarters: Hayes, UK
- Area served: United Kingdom
- Key people: James Gulliver (Chairman)

Argyll Foods plc was the fourth biggest supermarket operator in the United Kingdom, through its acquisitions of a number of smaller supermarkets. In 1987 the company acquired Safeway Inc.'s UK subsidiary and in 1996 it changed its name to Safeway plc.

== History ==
=== Early years ===
The company was founded as James Gulliver Associates in 1977 by James Gulliver, a former Fine Fare Chief Executive, Alistair Grant, a marketing specialist and David Webster, a merchant banker. The founders acquired two food businesses, Morgan Edwards, a business owning the Supervalu chain of foodstores, and Louis C. Edwards, a meat business in Manchester, integrated them and then, in 1980, adopted the name Argyll Foods after Gulliver's place of birth.

In 1981 the company bought Oriel Foods, a food manufacturing and wholesaling business which the founders had briefly owned previously in the 1970s before they sold it to RCA Corporation and which owned Lo-Cost Discount Stores. Also in 1981 the company made a £91m hostile bid for Linfood Holdings, a wholesaling and retailing group which was substantially bigger than itself and owned Gateway Foodmarkets: however the bid was referred to the Monopolies Commission and did not proceed.

=== Presto and other acquisitions ===
The company went on to buy Allied Suppliers from Cavenham Foods in 1982: this brought with it the Presto, Liptons, Galbraith and R & J Templeton chains. The company had become the fourth biggest supermarket with 923 stores.

In 1984 Argyll acquired the Thornaby-based Amos Hinton plc which operated 55 supermarkets under the Hintons name in the North East of England, Cumbria and Yorkshire.

In 1985 Presto became Argyll's principal name for all larger stores as well as smaller stores in the North of England and Scotland. The Lo-Cost banner was used in the rest of England and in Wales on the smaller stores: a new Presto logo was launched and plans made for new Presto regional distribution centres in Bristol, Wakefield, Bathgate and Welwyn Garden City.

In 1986 Argyll hoped to buy Distillers plc but were hindered by the infamous Guinness share-trading fraud.

=== Safeway acquisition ===
Argyll and Safeway merged in 1987 when Safeway Inc.'s United Kingdom subsidiary, Safeway Food Stores as it was then known, was put up for sale. Argyll eventually secured it for the sum of £681m, with £600m raised through a rights issue that was three times over-subscribed. The merger of Argyll and Safeway was hailed by commentators as one of the most successfully integrated retail combinations in the UK, bringing together Argyll's experienced management team with a strong but somewhat under-developed retail brand. The acquisition brought with it 133 UK stores of Safeway, Inc. the first of which had been opened in 1962.

In July 1996 Argyll conducted a share buyback and then renamed itself Safeway plc.
