= Louis Edwards (businessman) =

English businessman

Louis Charles Edwards (15 June 1914 – 25 February 1980) was an English businessman from Salford, Lancashire, who was most notable for being chairman of Manchester United from June 1965 until his death in February 1980.

== Early life and businesses ==
Edwards was born to Catherine and Louis Edwards Sr. at Liverpool Street in Pendleton, Salford, on Monday, 15 June 1914. He was educated at a Catholic grammar school but left at the age of fourteen to work in the family's meat packaging and processing business. He was a Manchester United fan from childhood.

After the Second World War was declared, he joined the 14th/20th Hussars and was based in India and as a desert rat in Egypt. He was demobilised from the army after the death of his father on 13 February 1943. He left Louis 77 shares and his younger brother Douglas, 75. As a result, Louis took over the running of the business. On 7 June 1944, at St Ann's Church, Manchester, Edwards married Muriel Bullen. They had two sons and a daughter.

The business rapidly expanded in the 1950s, and in 1961 Edwards's company had contracts worth £393,000 a year and provided meat for 300,000 schools. The following year it was floated on the stock exchange. In the mid-1960s, it employed 1,300 people, had eighty retail outlets and had contracts with Woolworths and authorities in Salford, Manchester and other parts of Lancashire.

== Manchester United ==
Edwards first met Matt Busby in 1950, as they were introduced by a mutual friend. From the mid-1950s he was an investor in Manchester United and joined the club's board of directors the day after the Munich air disaster in February 1958 and bought ten shares worth £1 each. He became vice-chairman in December 1964 and club chairman in June 1965 upon the death of Harold Hardman, overseeing United's success in winning the First Division title in 1967, finishing runners up in 1968, and the European Cup on 29 May that year. By the early 1970s Edwards was the majority shareholder at the club. The upgrade and development of Old Trafford occurred under his chairmanship, including a new cantilever stand, ringed by theatre style executive boxes. Other stands and restaurants were added, with relatively modern training facilities.

Edwards was elected to the Football League Management Committee in 1968 and served for four years.

On 5 February 1979, he sold his business to James Gulliver of Argyll Foods for £100,000. The deal also included a 16 per cent stake in Manchester United for Gulliver, who became a vice-president of the club. Edwards retired from the business world apart from his four-days-a-month consultancy position for Gulliver. He devoted his full-time commitments towards Manchester United and was at Old Trafford most days. Initially, Edwards' business retained the name Louis C. Edwards and Sons, but changed its name in October 1980. Gulliver bought 500,000 of the family's shares at 5p each.

== Controversies ==
In 1966, a report by the Manchester City Council complained of the bad supplies they were getting and said the firm delivered the worst meat to the poorest parts of the city. In 1978 the company was fined for poor quality and excess fat in the meat supplied for Cheshire County Council's schools.

An investigation by the Granada Television/ITV investigative journalism series World in Action was broadcast on 28 January 1980 based on compilation that began in January 1979. The program alleged there Louis Edwards was illegal share deals involving false documentation and large secret cash payments to the Manchester City Council and company staff to win contracts for his business.

It also alleged that Manchester United used money from a special fund for inducements to sign footballers throughout the 1960s and 1970s. In one case in the early 1960s, it was alleged that a bribe of £5,000 was paid to the parents of Peter Lorimer, a promising young player whom the club had wanted to recruit. The money was later returned when the player chose Leeds United instead, though this was a clear breach of Football Association rules. The programme explained how Edwards quietly acquired his majority shareholding at Manchester United in the early 1960s and then bolstered his family's holding in the late 1970s in preparation for the controversial rights issue.

On 12 February, Manchester City Police said they were going to investigate the allegations made against both Louis Edwards and Manchester United.

== Death ==
Edwards himself hired a firm of lawyers to go through his business transactions and private papers in order to build evidence against all the charges levelled at him. However, Edwards suffered a massive heart attack and died in the bath on the evening of Monday, 25 February 1980. The FA decided against a formal investigation and merely discussed the issue. The case was eventually dropped because of a lack of evidence.
