= Louis Edwards =

Louis Edwards may refer to:

- Louis Edwards (businessman) (1914–1980), English businessman and chairman of Manchester United
- Louis Edwards (author), American novelist
- Louis F. Edwards (1892–1939), American mayor of Long Beach, New York who was assassinated
