= Cavenham Foods =

Food manufacturing and retailing conglomerate

- Type: Private
- Industry: Retail
- Founded: 1964
- Defunct: 1986
- Fate: Liquidated
- Headquarters: London, United Kingdom
- Key people: James Goldsmith, (founder and chairman)

Cavenham Foods (also known as Cavenham) was a retail and food processing conglomerate started by Sir James Goldsmith in 1964. The company started out as a group of struggling UK food brands, including Carr's and Hollands Toffee purchased and brought together by Goldsmith. By 1973, the company had grown extensively with a series of take overs, and operated grocery stores under the Home and Colonial Stores, Lipton and Maypole brands in the UK, Grand Union in the US, UK brands Bovril and Ambrosia and continental brands Melchers, Amora, Synthol and Unimel amongst others. The company would become Europe's third largest food processor after Unilever and Nestlé. From 1978 onwards, Goldsmith started to break up Cavenham and by 1986 the company was put into voluntary liquidation.

== Early history ==
By 1964, Sir James Goldsmith had already built and sold several businesses with differing success, including Laboratories Cassene and Lewis & Burrows (which would become Mothercare). At the time he owned a French pharmaceutical business called Gustin-Milical, which produced a slimming drug called Milical, as well as self-tanning product Right Tan which were selling well across Europe. He also owned 20% of Procea Products, a British firm that made slimline bread that he purchased in 1963 from the Doughnut Corporation of America. However Goldsmith was short of funds to expand his business further, and was introduced to Great Universal Stores Sir Isaac Wolfson by Charles Clore, who loaned Goldsmith £1 million at an interest rate of 100 percent.

With this injection of cash, Goldsmith created a private company, Cavenham Foods to start making further investments. The company was named after his grandfather Adolphe's estate in Suffolk to which his father Frank would talk fondly of. Cavenham's first investment was to purchase a controlling shareholding in chocolate manufacturer Carsons. Carsons, which had started life as H J Packer in 1881, was financially not in good place having failed to pay dividends for two years and recording a loss of £50,000 in 1963. Goldsmith transferred his shares in Procea Products, which had been valued at £310,000, into Carsons which gave him a 55% shareholding. By June, Carsons had offered to not only purchase the 80% of shares they did not own in Procea Products, they had also offered to purchase a smaller confectionery business called Yeatman for a combined total of £1.5 million. It was during the Yeatman deal, that Goldsmith met Roland Franklin of merchant banking firm Keyser Ullman, who Yeatman banked with. Goldsmith liked Franklin, and with it Keyser Ullman became Cavenham Foods merchant bank. After these deals were completed, Cavenham then expanded again by purchasing controlling shares in Carr & Co, the biscuit manufacturer, after a takeover battle with J. Lyons and Co., and J A & P Holland, a confectionery group that had overstretched itself trying to become a group big enough to take on Cadburys or Rowntree's. Described by the Daily Mail in 1961 as the world's biggest toffee manufacturer, Holland's had diversified into boiled sweets, liquorice, chocolates, paper, printing, packaging and plastic manufacturing.

In January 1965, the Sunday Times first reported on Cavenham Foods (which now had shareholdings in three public listed companies: Carsons, Carr & Co and J & A.P. Holland) and Goldsmith, commenting that they believed,

the most probable solution would be to select one of the companies as a vehicle to make share exchange offers for the others. Holland would seem to be the most likely choice.

In June 1965, Goldsmith with help from Roland Franklin and Keyser Ullman, started to implement a plan by first selling the Carlisle factory of Carr & Co for £600,000 and leasing it back for £63,000 a year. The money gained by the sale was used by Carr's to purchase Cavenham's shares in Carsons, with Carr's then purchasing J. A & P. Holland from Cavenham. Carr & Co then changed their name to Cavenham Foods, and so Cavenham became listed on the London Stock Exchange. The deals were not illegal at the time, as Charles Raw of the Sunday Times stated later, but while Carr & Co paid cash for Goldsmith's shares via Cavenham, Carsons and Holland's other shareholders only received paper shares in the new company. It was largely because of deals like this that the London Stock Exchange would change its rules. Cavenham Foods at this point employed 6000 people, with a turnover of £30 million and assets of £7 million but was making no profits. However Goldsmith was bullish to Cavenham shareholders declaring that the company would make a profit of £215,000 in its first year. The new company impressed the Sunday Times,

Cavenham Foods, the new bakery and confectionery group which will result from the merger of the James Goldsmith controlled food companies, looks like becoming one of the most interesting shares on the stock exchange

== The public company in the 1960s ==
Goldsmith warned shareholders after the merger that

The reorganisation that will follow will be inevitably will be a lengthy and expensive operation... the material benefits are unlikely to be realised in the immediate future

Shortly after completing the merger of the Cavenham Foods subsidiaries, Goldsmith and his distant cousin Alexis de Gunzeberg purchased a 20% shareholding, through their new company Cavenham Investments, in a tobacco firm called Singleton & Cole from Jim Slater. The pair stated publicly that Cavenham Foods would have the option to purchase the shareholding at the same price they had paid. Goldsmith at first tried to complete a friendly takeover offer, but Singleton's chairman George Waddington was not interested and brought in merchant bank S. G. Warburg & Co to fight Goldsmith's bid. The Sunday Times at the time reported,

Singletons argue that if Goldsmith wants the business he must pay for it - in cash or underwritten paper. Goldsmith in turn says he won't pay cash because the shares are too high, buoyed by his own market dealings.

After further battles between the board and Goldsmith, Goldsmith upped his offer in May 1966 to two Cavenham Foods shares for one of Singletons, valuing the business at £1.4 million, which Waddinton reluctantly accepted. Unfortunately, the addition of Singleton & Cole didn't help Cavenham Food as it added another company that was struggling. However the company did just make Goldsmith's profit prediction, making a profit of £216,749, though after taxes the group only made £33,000 net profit. At this point, Cavenham had sold the paper business acquired through Hollands, and closed five of the combined groups 11 factories, concentrating them in the remaining sites. However the reorganisation of the company was still ongoing, and Goldsmith's strong predictions of continued profits quickly disappeared, that by Autumn the company was already £100,000 down. The dietary products, Slimcea and Procea had increased sales, but Singleton & Cole was struggling and so was the wholesaling business. To try and help the business, Cavenham agreed a merger of its Cavenham Confectionery business with the confectionery business of Perrier, who owned brands including Menier and Lindt. However, this deal, which took the confectionery arms losses off Cavenham Foods accounts and kept their share price up was not enough, and the company was heading towards a £1 million loss. Although Singleton & Cole was generally losing money, two subsidiaries were actually increasing sales. The two companies produced Snuff, which was made from waste tobacco bought at a low price, and then sold with high margins. Goldsmith put the companies in the hand of a broker to find a buyer, and American business Conwood Corporation expressed interest. Conwood sent business consultant John Tigrett to do a deal. Goldsmith wanted £2 million, but Tigrett did not believe the figures stacked up. Instead of buying the whole business, Tigrett agreed on behalf of Conwood to buy half but this did not help Cavenhams financial position. However Tigrett had a plan, and with Goldsmith and de Gunzeberg they went to Switzerland where they created Conwood SA, a 50 / 50 venture owned by Cavenham & Conwood, which then borrowed money from Swiss banks to purchase Cavenham's Snuff companies for £811,241. Cavenham had only valued the businesses at £76,100, so had made a profit of £730,000 and still owned a 50% share in the business. However this deal had only put a dent in the company' losses, and Roland Franklin, and David Eastman, of Cavenham's stockbroker Joseph Sebag & Company told Goldsmith that he needed to put in £500,000 cash or the company would be finished. Goldsmith did not have £500,000, but he did have his successful French pharmaceutical company Gustin-Milical, while business partner De Gunzeberg had several assets which they pledged against loans from several French banks. The loans were made to their jointly owned Cavenham Investments company, whose only assets were shares in Cavenham Foods, which gave the £500,000 as a gift that Goldsmith stated was to enhance that company's trading position. The gift meant Cavenham Foods was still financially able to pay their bills, but could not pay a share dividend and made a tiny net profit of £7,157 at the end of the 1966/67 financial year. However the company auditors, Price Waterhouse stated that Goldsmith's financial shuffling, which Goldsmith had stated in the accounts was justified by the prospects of the group was

a question on which we do not feel able to express an opinion.

In late 1967, Goldsmith and De Gunzeberg purchased a 45% share of French property and investment firm, Union de Transports et de Participations for £300,000 from failed financial group Union Financiere de Paris, which would later become part of Cavenham's future. Cavenham Foods, though was still struggling. The business now split into bakery, confectionery, retailing, wholesaling, tobacco and grocery was by 1968 looking at making a loss. The retail business, Hayes Lyon, was a chain of twenty two newsagents in the North West that J A & P Holland had owned, was being reorganised under former Co-op manager Jim Wood, but the wholesaling business (created by the merger of J A & P Holland and Singleton & Cole's wholesaling arms) was in bad shape, with Goldsmith cutting his losses and selling the business. The Southern and Midland based sites were sold to Palmer and Harvey, while the Northern warehouses were sold to Robert Sinclair & Company (part of Imperial Tobacco) for a total of £2.4 million. By the end of the financial year, Cavenham Foods had lost over £500,000, but positively Procea had more than half of the UK market for low-calorie bread and seen its profits grow from £1.1 million in 1965 to £2.4 million by 1968. Other good news for Goldsmith was Jim Wood had made the newsagents profitable, with Goldsmith buying a chain of 60 further newsagents from a receiver, called Alex Shops which Goldsmith sold 11 of the stores to recoup the purchase cost. However, in France, Goldsmith and his business partner de Gunzeberg expanded their interests. During their purchase of Union de Transports et de Participations, now called Union de Participations (UdP), they met Madame Gilberte Beaux and Count Thierry de Clermont-Tonnere who were tasked to selling of the assets of the bankrupt Union Financiere de Paris. They both had impressed Goldsmith, and he asked Beaux to join his company, but she had not completed the sale of the bankrupt company. Goldsmith said he would buy the remains of the company, though he did not have any funds and asked her to use her contacts in banking circles to raise the loans to purchase the business. Beaux, with assistance of de Clermont-Tonnere organised the loans for Goldsmith. After the purchase Goldsmith and de Gunzeberg moved their 80% shareholding of Gustin-Milical, which owned 15% of Cavenham's shares, into Union de Participations, making them a 70 percent paper profit. Union de Participations would in October 1968 purchase the French Bank and property group, Societe Generale Fonciere, which was then renamed Generale Occidentale. Goldsmith and de Gunzeberg transferred their shareholdings in Cavenham Foods to Union de Participations.

By the summer of 1969, Cavenham had finally made a profit, with Goldsmith telling shareholders

Your company today consists of three profitable and growing trading divisions, a 50 per cent interest in a substantial international and confectionery group, and considerable surplus cash. All the trading divisions did appreciably better than forecast in the last annual report

The company started expanding by purchasing in October 1969, Anabbs Ltd, a chain of newsagents in Greater London from Davies Ltd which tripled the retail business turnover. The partnership with Perrier was dissolved in Autumn 1969, and Cavenham Confectionery was sold to Conwood SA for £1.2 million, the company owned 50/50 by Cavenham Foods and Conwood Corporation. By December the company had announced half year pre-tax profits of £458,000, with The Financial Times predicted that

Cavenham Foods looks well on the way to making the long awaited leap forward this year

Cavenham Foods would finish 1969 with purchasing the Dutch distillers Melchers for £900,000, makers of gin, brandy and creme de menthe under the Olifant brand.

In France, Union de Participations purchased through Generale Occidentale, 60% of the French listed company Financiere et Industrielle de Petrole et de Pharmacie (known as FFIP) and moved Gustin-Milical, which had purchased several French chemical and pharmaceutical companies, into FFIP.

== The public company in the 1970s ==
Cavenham continued into 1970 in the same way they finished 1969, by the purchase of 60% shareholding in Dutch chocolate manufacturer Ringers Cacao en Chocoladefabrieken. However Goldsmith was planning for bigger purchases, and in February 1970 he asked the London Stock Exchange to suspend the shares in Cavenham Foods, while the company completed a reorganisation and expansion. The company shares at this point were worth 15 shillings, up from the 4 shillings and 6 pence they had been in 1967. The first part of the deal was for Cavenham Foods to buy from Goldsmith & de Gunzeberg's UdP company, the 60% shareholding in FFIP in a cash and share deal. This was swiftly followed by Cavenham purchasing the Swiss company Conwood SA, with Conwood Corporation receiving shares in Cavenham. This saw the return of the confectionery and tobacco businesses back under Cavenham's full control. They also purchased French company Gremy-Longuet, maker of popular product Synthol. By the end of the deals, Goldsmith and de Gunzeberg via UdP owned 70 to 75% of the companies shares. Shortly after, UdP was renamed Societe Generale Occidentale and became the holding company for all of Goldsmith's business interests. After completing the merger of his companies, Goldsmith continued his purchasing streak, buying another Dutch distillery Schade en Buysing which made his newly acquired Dutch businesses half the size of Dutch distillery giant Bols. Cavenham's next purchase was the newsagent chains Birrell and RS McColl from owners Keyser Ullman, who were Cavenham's merchant bank. The Guardian called the deal a poor advertisement for Keyser Ullman's ability to negotiate. The deal cost Cavenham £900,000, and was paid for by issuing 1 million in new Cavenham shares and a further £250,000 in cash, but it did include £900,000 in debts owed to the previous owner of RS McColl, Cadbury Schweppes. The business was added to the existing stores run by Jim Wood that had been renamed Triple Trader, and after selling 105 of the stores, had expanded the Cavenham's retail stores to 388 locations. The Cavenham shares that Keyser Ullman had received as part of the deal were then sold to Generale Occidentale, another deal seen as part of Goldsmith's incestuous trading. Later in 1970, Cavenham announced that pre-tax profits up to 28 March 1970 was £731,316.

=== 1971 ===
By the start of 1971, Cavenham had sold Ringers Cacao en Chocoladefabrieken to Koninklijke Droste Fabrieken as it had been a disappointment. In March 1971, Cavenham was being linked in The Guardian to buying rival biscuit manufacturer Associated Biscuits, makers of brands Huntley & Palmers, Peek Freans and Jacob's, to grow Cavenham's small share of the market through Carrs. However Goldsmith had set his target on Bovril, the company created by John Lawson Johnston, and now run by his son George Lawson Johnston, 1st Baron Luke. Bovril, which also produced products as varied as Ambrosia Creamed Rice, Marmite and Jaffajuice, had been seen as a takeover target since the mid-1960s, but had put most suitors off due to the huge losses made at its South American assets. Business consultant John Tigrett arranged a meeting with Lord Luke using his ties to Conwood Corporation to ascertain if a bid was worth making. In the meeting, Tigrett had said he represented investors who wanted to inject cash into Bovril (with no mention of Cavenham) and asked questions about the company's balance sheet and its South American holdings, which Lord Luke could not answer himself. At this point Tigrett realised Goldsmith assertions that company was badly run were correct, and Goldsmith started slowly buying shares quietly. In June 1971, Cavenham Foods announced that profits were greater than was forecasted, at £1.96 million pre-tax compared to the expected £1.68 million. This was helped by sales increasing from £18.85 million to £33.6 million, helped by Jim Wood sorting out the retail purchases which turned a profit of £300,000. The press by this time had started to speculate on Cavenham making a bid for Bovril. At this point Cavenham's share price was at 87p.

Four days later, Goldsmith launched his bid for Bovril, offering 310p a share, valuing the company at £9.5 million, with Bovril's share price rising by 44 1/2p to 295p on that day's dealings, which had been as low as 171p earlier in the year. A week later, Goldsmith announced that he had sold 50% of Cavenham's retail business to a newly formed company, Southland Cavenham in a similar deal that he had with Conwood Corporation with the Snuff businesses. John Tigrett was again behind the deal, with American retailer Southland Corporation, operators of 7-Eleven stores, paying £3.3 million with an additional 20% increase if sales exceed profits of £375,000. Two weeks later, Goldsmith raised his offer to 320p which valued Bovril at £10.6 million, although Bovril's share price had risen to 336p. A day later, after some discussion between Bovril and Rowntree Mackintosh directors, Rowntree's purchased 9.2% of Bovril's shares as part of a friendly takeover bid designed by the Bovril board to beat off Cavenham. Rowntree's bid of 335p a share was greater than Cavenham's, but below the market price of 365p. At this point stories had started to appear in the press that mystery buyers were purchasing Cavenham shares to increase their market value. Goldsmith had arranged finance with Roland Franklin and Keyser Ullman, but it was not enough, so he arranged for Madam Beaux to work on the deal, who securing loan guarantees from French banks. By 16 July, Goldsmith had secured enough finance to telegram every Bovril shareholders and offer a cash alternative deal worth 310p a share. He had also used every bit of spare cash he could find to buy shares on the open market. Goldsmith was determined to purchase Bovril, especially after Jim Slater told him if he failed to get Bovril,

You will never succeed in a bid in the City of London again.

The deal was not a certainty, with Goldsmith and his team considering pulling out as Bovril pushed hard to the merger with Rowntree. Bovril announced a forecast of 50% increase in profits, buoyed by currency changes happening in Argentina. This came on top of Beechams and an Argentinian consortium headed by Juan Del Azar waiting in the wings. However Goldsmith was contacted by Maxwell Joseph, who offered to buy Bovril's dairy farms for Grand Metropolitan's Express Dairies division, and using this offer Goldsmith was able to go to the banks and raise further cash. By August Goldsmith had raised his bid to 423p which rated Bovril at £13 million, though Bovril's share price had risen to 457p. A week later Rowntree counter offered with a bid of £13.5 million, but Cavenham increased their bid to £14.5 million made up of share and loan stock. A few days later, Goldsmith offered Bovril shareholders a cash alternative of 460p a share, which was greater than Rowntree's share offer of 436p. It was reported that Cavenham had 24% of Bovril's shares against Rowntree's 18%. As part of looking at the bidders for Bovril, the Financial Times broke down Cavenham's operations:

Dietary, Pharmaceutical & Chemical Products

- FFIP
- Laboratoires Gremy-Longuet
- Laboratoires de Medicine Experimentale G. Tetard
- Agrifurane

Retail

- McColls Ltd
- Birrells Ltd
- Alex Shops Ltd
- Hayes Lyon Ltd

Food, Confectionery

- Procea Products Ltd
- Carrs of Carlisle Ltd
- Cavenham Confectionery Ltd

Tobacco

- Illingworths Tobacco Ltd
- Wittman GmbH
- Tobakt A.B.
- Singleton & Cole Pty

Branded Spirits

- Melchers N.V.

By 17 August, Cavenham had announced they had control of 34.5% of Bovril's shares. A day later, the Daily Telegraph were reporting that Cavenham controlled 43% of the shares in Bovril, but later that day Goldsmith announced he had purchased 47% of the shareholding, and had been promised the stocks in Bovril that were held by other companies, including Prudential Assurance. Later John Tigrett said that,

We were buying stocks without funds, to tell the truth... and we were getting right up to the ragged edge

But the system of two week accounting at the London Stock Exchange meant they could be paid for well after their purchase. It was reported after that some of the stock sellers didn't actually own the Bovril shares they were selling at the time, a process that continued until rules were tightened after Guinness share-trading fraud. The total price paid in the end, in cash and shares, was £15 million. By the end of the year, Cavenham had sold the dairy farm business to Grand Metropolitan's Express Dairies division for £6.3 million, Madame Beaux had used her contacts to sell the South American business and the company had nearly doubled Bovril's profits to £2.2 million, which meant that with other asset disposals at Bovril, Cavenham had nearly recouped their £15 million outlay. Management Today wrote,

Jimmy Goldsmith is now believed capable of everything. Yet before the Bovril bid and, indeed, during much of the bid there were a few people - least of all in the City- who believed he was capable of anything at all

Shortly after the Bovril deal Goldsmith changed the company name to plain Cavenham. He also had not relented in his quest for growth, telling Cavenham managers at the Savoy Hotel,

We must get on with another acquisition. This bull market is not going to last for ever. We must be quick.

On 22 September 1971, it was announced that Cavenham had purchased Willie Webster & his wife's 41% shareholding in Wright's Biscuits, which owned a 42% shareholding in Moores Stores, which along with the Wright's own personal shares in Moores gave Cavenham 47% of the stock. The price of 36p a share, valued the shareholdings at £6.5 million, which was worth less than the market value, however Wright's and Moores had both struggled. Wright's Biscuits had predicted losses of £500,000, while Moores Stores had seen profits tumble from over £1 million to £560,000 since 1968. Goldsmith offered 45p a share to the rest of the remaining stock owners in both companies, but this was against a market value of 82p. Moores Stores operated around 685 grocery stores under both their own name and subsidiaries like Hay & Co, while in addition to its biscuit manufacturing, Wright's operated a further 488 grocery stores under brands like Gowers & Burgon in Sheffield. However Cavenham found their bid receiving hostility from share holders, led by Liverpool accountant John C. Malthouse, as the value of the companies assets was worth at least 110p a share compared to Cavenham's 45p offer. By November Wright's had announced losses of £1.23 million, far greater than previously predicted but Cavenham did not withdraw its interest, and in December they formally released their offer to the shareholders, offering ordinary shares in Cavenham. Cavenham completed the purchase of the remaining shares against hostile shareholders at a total cost of £10 million in shares. The stores of Wright's and Moores Stores were then sold to a new company, Cavenham-Southland, which as part of the Southland deal previously brokered by John Tigrett, Southland owned 49.9% with Cavenham owning the remaining 50.1%. Later in December, Cavenham purchased the South African Marmite company, and then added French pharmaceutical and agricultural company Sanders International for £12.7 million, and Sodep S.A., an animal feed producer to French subsidiary FFIP in early 1972. At this point Cavenham's share price had grown from 87p in June 1971 to 230p. The Investor Chronicle commented,

There is never a dull moment with Cavenham

=== 1972 ===
Goldsmith wasn't going to relent, and was soon looking for his next target. In his sights was Allied Suppliers, a group that included Lipton, a tea and grocery business, and grocers Home and Colonial Stores, Maypole and Presto supermarkets amongst others. Allied Suppliers was under the control of Unilever, who owned 12% of the shareholding but these controlled 33.7% of the voting shares and had put off most suitors in the past, including Spillers, Allied Breweries and Charles Clore. Goldsmith contacted the finance director of Unilever, Cob Stenham, about buying their shareholding in Allied Suppliers. Goldsmith offered as part of the deal, to sell Unilever the tea business of Lipton when he completed his takeover. However, both Unilever and Cavenham were listed companies so could not agree a deal in advance, without it being acceptable to the London Stock Exchange or the government's Takeover panel. They agreed that the price for Liptons tea business should be decided by an independent accountant, Sir Ronald Leach, President of the Institute of Chartered Accountants after the takeover. With that agreement Cavenham purchased Unilever's shareholding for £10.4 million and on 14 January launched an £82.5 million bid for the rest of the company. It was a massive bid, with Cavenham's own share value only £65 million, and the deal was made up of Cavenham shares and £22 million in cash. On 18 January Goldsmith met with the board of Allied where they agreed to his takeover if he increased his offer by an extra 20p per share, valuing Allied Suppliers shares at 400p. Goldsmith agreed to the £86 million deal, but in doing so he reduced Generale Occidentale's shareholding in Cavenham to 25%.

Goldsmith went on holiday in February 1972, but while away he had his team send all the information on Liptons Tea business. He left his six-week break to put his case to Sir Ronald Leach's adjudication, returning to the Aegean to complete his yachting vacation. Unilever had expected to pay about £10 to £12 million, but on the day of the verdict, Goldsmith had gone ashore with John Aspinall. Annabel Birley, Goldsmith's lover at the time took the call from London but didn't take the price reached down correctly. Goldsmith had to call back and was told that Unilever were told to pay £18.5 million, which they completed in August. As part of the Southland's deal, they had the option to buy half of the newly acquired Allied Suppliers but couldn't afford the £25 million asking price. Goldsmith did however sell three of Allied's properties for £18 million. In March Jim Wood was promoted to Cavenham's board. Cavenham disposed of the biscuit interests in Wright's Biscuits, Wright's subsidiary Kemp Biscuits, and the famous Carr's to United Biscuits in 1972 for $10 million due to only have a tiny 3% market share. This was followed up by selling further Allied Suppliers assets, including property to Jim Slater, raising a further £4 million. In April 1972, Cavenham purchased 7.5% of the shares in French food giant Generale Alimentaire for FR20.8 million, with Goldsmith's Generale Occidentale purchasing a further 11.2%. Generale Alimentaire biggest shareholder, with a 25% holding was Compagnie du Nord, a company owned by Goldsmith's cousins the Rothschild's. Cavenham's French businesses run by FFIP was then merged into Generale Alimentaire, in a deal worth FR255.7 million, which Generale Alimentaire issued 1.4 million shares to Cavenham. Under French government approval, a subsidiary called SEPA was set up to hold the 54.18% of Generale Alimentaire shares, which was divided at 49% by Cavenham and 51% by Generale Occidentale, which gave Cavenham management of the expanded company and met the French government's insistence that Generale Alimentaire remained under French ownership. The company expanded again in November 1972, when it purchased 75% of the shares in Swedish food manufacturer AB Felix from its owner AB Cardo for $13.5 million. The company also operated a subsidiary in Austria.

=== 1973 ===
Goldsmith let Cavenham and Generale Alimentaire reorganise their new businesses, and in January 1973 he went on a holiday travelling across the US and Mexico. But in February 1973, seeing what he thought was the signs of financial troubles in the British economy told Cavenham finance director Lionel Ross to sell Cavenham's property. Along with his other business Anglo-Continental doing similar, Goldsmith was raising cash to protect Cavenham against a crash. However Goldsmith felt he needed to grow his business outside of Europe to protect Cavenham against the expected crash, exploring deals for both the US baby food manufacturer Beech-Nut and the food and tobacco group Liggett and Myers. These did not proceed, but Goldsmith started Project Grand Slam, with a plan to purchase the conglomerate British American Tobacco (BAT). He contacted the chairman of the largest shareholder, Imperial Tobacco, Sir John Partridge. He offered to buy Imperial's 28% shareholding in BAT for 14.9% in Cavenham shares with the rest in Loan stock. Partridge agreed in principle but told the Prime Minister Edward Heath, who was facing a general election. Heath asked Partridge not to go ahead with the deal, probably not wanting a takeover deal happening during the election. In the summer, Cavenham purchased 400,000 shares of Generale Alimentaire from Compagnie du Nord in a share exchange and had raised £17.5 million on selling property to Guardian Properties. The company also announced that Allied Suppliers had gone into partnership with Goldbergs, a Scottish department store chain, to set up a new supermarket chain, Ailsa Superstores that Allied would own 51% of. In December 1973, Cavenham completed a purchase of 51% shareholding in US supermarket Grand Union Company for £62 million through its newly created subsidiary Cavenham Holdings Inc. The deal had been brokered by Andre's Meyer of Lazard Freres with Grand Union's president Charles G. Rodman. Grand Union was at the time the 10th largest grocery chain in the US and had a turnover of $1.46 billion but was struggling with diversification. The deal was financed through Hambros Bank, as Goldsmith had decided that Keyser Ullman was not big enough a merchant bank to deal with his future deals.

=== 1974-1975 ===
At the start of 1974 the recession hit, but Cavenham reportedly had £90m in cash reserves, and Charles Hambro said,

Jimmy was pretty well placed. I don't think anyone really foresaw the extent the debacle, the collapse in values, but certainly Jimmy came through it well

By March 1974, Cavenham controlled 55% of the shares in Generale Alimentaire. In April 1974, Jim Wood was made the President and Chief Operating Officer of Grand Union. In September, Cavenham purchased Sanders SA Industrial et Conservas Ibericas, the former Spanish arm of subsidiary Sanders. Anglo-Continental Investments had used the cash raised to purchase shares in Cavenham, with both Generale Occidentale and Anglo-Continental owning 39.25% of the company's shareholding. In March 1975, Cavenham's annual report showed the company had made £17 million pre tax profits and had cash reserves of £30 million, with the company stating it was concentrating our efforts on our main activities and finding the new capital necessary to support them by eliminating operations that are marginal or unrelated to the main stream of our business. This was forewarning of Goldsmith's next actions including selling Laboratoires Gremy-Longuet to Smith, Kline & French, and the Slimea/Procea business to Spillers. Later in the year, Cavenham Holdings Inc. started the purchase of a further 30% shareholding in Grand Union, where Jim Wood had closed 47 stores and opened 19 new ones and seen turnover grow to £1.5 billion. A new company, Cavenham (USA) Inc was set up by Cavenham Holdings Inc to hold the shareholding in Grand Union.

=== 1976 ===
At the start of 1976, Patrick Sergeant in the Daily Mail asked why the stock markets had got it wrong about Cavenham, and why its stock price was so weak against other food businesses, especially with profits expected to grow from £27.1 million in 1974/75 to £32 million in 1976. Cavenham (USA) confirmed that they had purchased further shares in Grand Union taking its shareholding to 82%. By May Goldsmith had announced that Cavenham were planning to purchase the other 50.5% of shares in Generale Alimentaire that it didn't own. The deal saw Generale Occidentale receive £25.7 million in newly issued Cavenham shares, with Cavenham receiving Generale Occidentale shareholding in Generale Alimentaire. The deal also increased Goldsmith's control over Cavenham, as the deal increased Generale Occidentale's, along with Anglo-Continental's shareholding in Cavenham to over 51% from the 39.5% they already owned. The deal had major reservations from three sizeable institutional shareholders, but the deal went through at the EGM after Goldsmith promised that Generale Occidentale would not bid for the remaining shares. French government which had originally blocked Cavenham owning Generale Alimentaire, did not object to the deal, as the share swop meant Cavenham would become French owned via Generale Occidentale.

In June Jim Wood announced that Grand Union were planning to invest $150 million in opening new stores. It was announced that the company had closed 230 stores under Cavenham's management, but it still had 487 stores, and net income had grown from $9.5 million in 1974/5 to $11.69 million in 1975/76. Part of the £150 million plan was to open 100 new stores within five years and to investigate purchasing other chains. The company announced that it had sold its 39 E-Z convenience stores and was planning to run down the Grand Way and Grand Catalogue non food chains. In August the release of the annual report saw pre-tax profits to June 1976 had grown to £34.7 million on sales of £1.69 billion and that Cavenham had cash reserves of £85 million. Goldsmith announced in the report that Cavenham planned to spend £200 million on new investments. The company made 37% of its profit in the UK, 31% in the US with the remaining 32% being earned in Europe. Soon after Goldsmith's cousin and business partner, Alexis de Gunzeberg resigned from the business. In December the company's six monthly figures were released and they were even better achieving pre-tax profits of £22.7 million, and confirming that they had bought the remaining shareholdings in subsidiaries AB Felix, and acquired the 49.8% of Cavenham-Southland from the Southland Corporation and renamed it Moores-Wright's. On the same day as the Cavenham-Southland deal, Cavenham sold 18.75% of their shares in the newsagent joint venture, Southland-Cavenham making Southland the majority shareholder and the name was changed to Southland-McColl. They also confirmed that they had sold off the plastics division of Generale Alimentaire, while Dutch distillery Melchers was sold Skol Breweries. In the same month Cavenham started purchasing shares in struggling British publisher, Beaverbrook Newspapers, owners of the Daily Express after being offered 4.4 million shares by Rupert Murdoch.

=== 1977 ===
In January, Cavenham (USA) announced that they were considering merging with Grand Union, making it a wholly owned subsidiary, contrary to Jim Wood's promise in June 1976 that Cavenham would not be looking to increase its shareholding. A few weeks later, Goldsmith announced that Generale Occidentale wanted to buy the remaining 49% of stock it did not own in Cavenham, contrary to the promise he made to shareholders in 1976, in a move that would take the company private once again. The bid was worth 120p per share, but by the end of the day trading Cavenham shares had gone up from 93p to 119p. Shortly after The Economist wrote an article As Goldsmith Goes, which criticised Goldsmith's argument that he wanted to take Cavenham private as he was vilified by the British press as the boss of a British public company. They stated that it was just to benefit himself, as the owner of a third of Generale Occidentale, not the shareholders of Cavenham, and that the deal rated a company with net assets of £130 million and cash reserves of £120 million at just £130 million was Goldsmith trying to get it on the cheap. It reported that the largest shareholder, Prudential Assurance were not happy with the offer. However, by the beginning of March, Generale Occidentale had announced that they were not going to proceed with the deal, as their initial plan of 120p a share was nowhere the 180p value that Cavenham's independent directors had been advised by the merchant bank Samuel Montagu & Co.. News of the withdrawal had seen Cavenham share price drop to 104p. Goldsmith redirected his target, and in mid March it was announced that Generale Alimentaire had purchased 45% shareholding in French news magazine L’Express. By April Cavenham had purchased 37% of the A shares in Beaverbrook Newspapers at a cost of £1.87 million, but Goldsmith lacked any power within the group as the shares did not have voting powers and Sir Max Aitken objected to the paper falling into his hands. However, on 27 April, Goldsmith received a call from Charles Wintour, the managing director of the Daily Express. Wintour informed Goldsmith that Associated Newspapers had agreed to buy the Evening Standard from Beaverbrook, with the plan to merge it with London's other daily paper the Evening News. Goldsmith quickly made announcements by midnight that he would be willing to invest to save the Evening Standard, which stopped Associated Newspapers announcing the deal the next day. Goldsmith did not want to damage Cavenham's share price, and two months later joined the takeover race for Beaverbrook in partnership with Tiny Rowland.

In May 1977, Generale Occidentale announced that they had negotiated a deal with Cavenham's independent directors to purchase half of the shares it didn't own for 160p per share. Patrick Hutber, the City editor of The Sunday Telegraph and friend of Goldsmith said he has - in my view unfortunate - shareholders over a barrel. A month later the offer made by Generale Occidentale was closed, after it was oversubscribed with 83% of the minority shareholders. Cavenham announced shortly after that the company had made an increase on pre-tax profits of £8.8 million from the previous year. The company made pre-tax profits of £34.7 million against a turnover of £1,716 million, an increase of turnover by £56 million. It was reported that retail sales were up, helped by the merger of Wrights-Moores into Allied Supplies in the UK, but manufacturing turnover was down by £74 million, not helped by sale of the pharmaceutical businesses. However, by the end of June Sir Max Aitken was still trying to stop Goldsmith from buying Beaverbrook, and by the beginning of July Beaverbrook was bought by rival bidder Trafalgar House for £13.69 million. Although Goldsmith lost out, Cavenham made a 100% profit by selling on their shares in Beaverbrook. Generale Occidentale's original offer to purchase part the minority shareholding in Cavenham was changed. At the criticism of Patrick Sergeant, City editor of the Daily Mail, Generale Occidentale would basically swop ordinary shares in Cavenham for preference shares, which would pay a better dividend but would have no voting rights. Sergeant stated that this deal was not costing Generale Occidentale any cash, and the extra dividend was being paid for out of Cavenham's profits. With the share deal completed, by the end of the year Cavenham had been taken private and was no longer listed on the London Stock Exchange. During 1977, Goldsmith brought in graphic designer Milton Glaser to revamp the Grand Union brand as part of his plans to grow the chain.

== Return to a private company ==
On 1 January, The New York Times did a Spotlight article on Goldsmith, which pointed out that minority shareholders in Grand Union were fighting Cavenham's buyout of the remaining stock. The article stated that Goldsmith had issued convertible preferred shares in Generale Occidentale and had borrowed heavily from the French government to fund the deal. On 6 January, Generale Occidentale announced they would purchase Generale Alimentaire from Cavenham. The deal was so the group did not have to pay tax on the dividends twice.

Goldsmith though pushed on with his plans to grow his US supermarket business by negotiating to purchase 8 Big Star branded stores from Colonial Stores. In April Jim Wood told Supermarket News, In about three months the shackles will be removed, and Grand Union expects to be sole to move more freely down the acquisition trail. However, by June Cavenham had offered $30 a share, a total of $114 million for the US 15th largest chain, after being recommended to purchase it by Roland Franklin, now a director of Cavenham. However Colonial's directors filed a lawsuit in July, as they believed the deal was not in the best of interests of shareholders and broke US federal antitrust rules, which affected grocery store mergers with combined store sales in excess of $500 million a year. Colonial also tried to block Cavenham's takeover by filing a lawsuit with the Virginia State Corporation Commission, stating they had failed to declare that it had obtained $30 million of the funds it needed from the Prudential Insurance Company in its offering. This was rejected on 1 August, and a day later Cavenham and Colonial agreed to a deal at an increased price of $133 million, or $35 a share. Grand Union been under a commission consent decree since June 1968, which Grand Union would have to ask permission from the Federal Trade Commission (FTC) to buy any rivals. The purchase of both the 8 stores and takeover of the chain happened shortly after the decree ended, and the FTC thought the merger asked serious questions under FTC rules on competition in the grocery market. On 18 August, Cavenham agreed with the FTC that it would keep Colonial as a separate subsidiary until the commission's investigation was concluded. Cavenham announced profits of £22.7 million on turnover of £1.66 million till the end of March 1978.

In October, Goldsmith told an International Chamber of Commerce Congress in Florida, that Britain was a rotting concoon which was crippling its industry. Goldsmith, who had already moved control of Cavenham to France under Generale Occidentale, had started to move control of the business to Hong Kong through his private company General Oriental. On 21 November the FTC confirmed that the formal complaint had been filed, on the grounds that the purchase of Colonial would lead to substantially lessen competition in the grocery market. Cavenham released their half year figures in December, where turnover had risen to £1,081 million from £1,020 million but profits had dropped by £2.4 million to £14.5 million. The figures however were not comparable to previous years because of the sale of Generale Alimentaire to Generale Occidentale.

=== 1979 ===
In January 1979, Southland Corporation purchased the remaining shares in Southland-McColl, ending Cavenham's involvement in the newsagent business. Grand Union had looked to sell its non food stores, Grand Way to SS Nicholls Inc. and Jamesway Corporation but this seemed to fail in January, but by June talks were happening between Zayre Corporation and Kmart. Goldsmith announced in July that Cavenham Pension fund, as well as Cavenham subsidiary Bovril Canada, had purchased shares in Diamond International as part of Generale Occidentale's interest in Diamond. Grand Union continued to grow its profits, when in August they announced that a net income of $9 million was made in the 16 weeks that ended on 21 July, which was nearly triple the $3.3 million earned in the corresponding quarter in the previous year. This was based on sales rising 79.2% to $937.4 million from $523.2 million, however this did include figures from the newly acquired Colonial Stores. They also opened their first Food Market concept store, in Wyckoff, New Jersey, which included French bakers, a spice market and a live fish tank as part of Goldsmith and Milton Glaser redesign. Grand Union also opened their first Basic stores, part of the new Box-store rebellion in Sunrise, Florida. The store was a huge success upon opening, with local roads being blocked by customers. Councilman John Montgomery called the store an illegal wholesale operation located in a retail location, though it was pointed out that the city had sanctioned the store. Cavenham itself announced that their yearly profits were up, with pre-tax profits at £35.5 million on £1,890 million of sales, an increase of nearly £3 million. This was unexpected after the half year figures had been down. Goldsmith told the Daily Mail that Cavenham was the third largest food retailer in the world.

In December Cavenham set up a new subsidiary, Cavenham Texas Inc, to purchase the Southern United States supermarket business of J. Weingarten Inc at $12 a share in cash. This was followed by expansion in the U.K. by purchasing supermarket chain Cater Brothers from British department store chain Debenhams for £14.5 million. The business was struggling and had lost £975,000 in 1977 and £383,000 in 1978, had 24 stores with a turnover of £54 million, with the stores being rebranded under the Presto chain.

=== 1980 ===
Grand Union opened further Basic Food Warehouse stores in Hialeh and Miramar in Florida, with the first Basic store arriving in Woodbridge, New Jersey followed shortly after by Marlow Heights by March. With the American economy struggling in a recession, Grand Union in response to the Carter administration imposed a 30-day price freeze on some private-label brands, which was extended for another 30 days in April. However Jim Wood tendered his resignation with Grand Union and Cavenham, and in April took up the role of chief executive of rival A&P. Wood was frustrated with several issues including the open rebellion by Colonial management, was offered a deal by A&P owners, German supermarket chain Tengelmann Group, which included stock options that Goldsmith called truly astounding and said We couldn't make any comparable offer. Wood would take his management team with him to A&P. Goldsmith took it upon himself to oversee the management of Grand Union. On 18 April it was reported that Generale Occidentale agreed to sell Generale Alimentaire to Danone. A day later it was confirmed that Bovril was sold to Beechams for £46 million, with Goldsmith stating that it was a strategic decision to get out of manufacturing as 90% of the company's turnover came from its retailing business. Shortly after AB Felix was sold to Swedish firm Beijerinvest. In May, Grand Union ended their price freeze stating that manufacturers had risen their prices, even though the White House consumer director Esther Peterson had asked them not to. In August Goldsmith, plus directors Madame Beaux and Peter Hill-Wood resigned from the board of Cavenham with Goldsmith stating he would concentrate on his role at Generale Occidentale. A few weeks later the Financial Times reported that the Department of Trade were investigating Goldsmith and his share dealings. On the same day, Goldsmith announced in his last speech as chairman that Cavenham's profits had risen to £42.6 million on sales of £1,884 million, and that Cavenham was pulling out of manufacturing as it was not seen as being compatible with a retail firm outside of the UK. In November, Cavenham withdrew its membership of the Confederation of British Industry along with Babcock International, Trafalgar House and European Ferries after the chairman, Sir Terence Beckett announced the CBI would have a "bare-knuckle" fight with the UK government if interest rates were not dropped. This was followed by news that Cavenham had bought Argyle Securities, a Goldsmith company owned by General Oriental, for £21 million in what was seen as another unusual Goldsmith deal.

=== 1981 ===
The last vestiges of Cavenham's food manufacturing business, Cavenham Confectionery was sold to the company's management for £8 million, who changed the company name to Famous Names. Cavenham Ltd, the UK arm of the company was renamed on 28 nApril to Allied Suppliers, though Grand Union would still remain owned by Cavenham Holdings, and the snuff business was still under Cavenham AG. Allied at this point had a turnover of £800 million, with Presto making up 44% of Allied's total sales. Allied had planned to invest £132 million in opening 10 to 15 news stores over a five-year period. Grand Union at the same time was reporting turnover had fallen from $4 billion in 1980 to $3.5 billion, but the five Basic stores opened in the Washington D.C. area had increased its sales by 50%. However, by the end of the second quarter profits at Grand Union had fallen to $6.85 million, down on the 1980 figure by $7.47 million. This was on top of the news that the FTC had ruled that Grand Union's purchase of Colonial was illegal and they stated that they must sell the chain and be banned from buying rivals for 10 years. Grand Union immediately challenged the ruling. However Grand Union continued to convert stores to Food Markets, which were costing $150 million and in November trialled a talking till scanner at its Stamford, Connecticut.

=== 1982 ===
In May, Generale Occidentale sold Allied Suppliers to Argyll Foods, run by James Gulliver for £101 million, with the Financial Times stating that Allied had lost market share under Cavenham and that in the last 6 years had taken £116 million in dividends. In the US, Grand Union was closing stores, 150 at a cost of $8.24 million by June and announced that they planned to spend $700 million over the next six years to convert more stores to the Food Market concept. The concept for the Food Market was seen as the push towards the larger profits that other gourmet supermarkets had seen. The Basic Food Warehouses were doing well, but Grand Union was struggling, and in 1982 the company made a profit of only $226,000 on sales of $3.5 billion.

== The end ==
1983 was even a worse year for Grand Union. Goldsmith continued his investment programme in Food Market stores, but continued to sell or close stores. The first quarter saw sales of $1.05 billion but made a net loss of $9.8 million, and it had not improved during the second quarter. The company eventually lost $115 million on $3.4 billion of sales.

In January, 46 of the Weingarten stores were sold to Safeway Inc., with the remaining stores being closed leaving Grand Union with 505 stores. In February the six Basic Food Warehouses in Florida were closed as part of closing the 49 Grand Union stores in the state. In the same month, Goldsmith recruited Floyd Hall from Target Stores as the company's new chief executive to try and resurrect Grand Union's fortunes. By March the remaining Basic stores in the Washington D.C. area were sold to Food-a-Rama. The FTC announced that they had rescinded the original commission decision regarding Colonial. Grand Union would end the year with a smaller loss of $63 million and just 395 stores. Cavenham's last business in Europe, the Snuff businesses run by Cavenham AG were sold to Imperial Tobacco.

Further stores were closed during 1985, with the company's sales falling to $2.6 billion but profits had grown to $60 million. The company was now the tenth-largest supermarket chain in the US, down from eighth-largest in 1980. In March 1986, Goldsmith moved to clean up his businesses and Cavenham was put onto voluntary liquidation with Grand Union transferred to Generale Occidentale.

== In popular culture ==
The character of Richard de Vere, and his fictional company Cavendish Foods in the BBC comedy To the Manor Born, were a thinly veiled dig at James Goldsmith and Cavenham.
