= Hintons =

British supermarket company

Amos Hinton & Sons plc
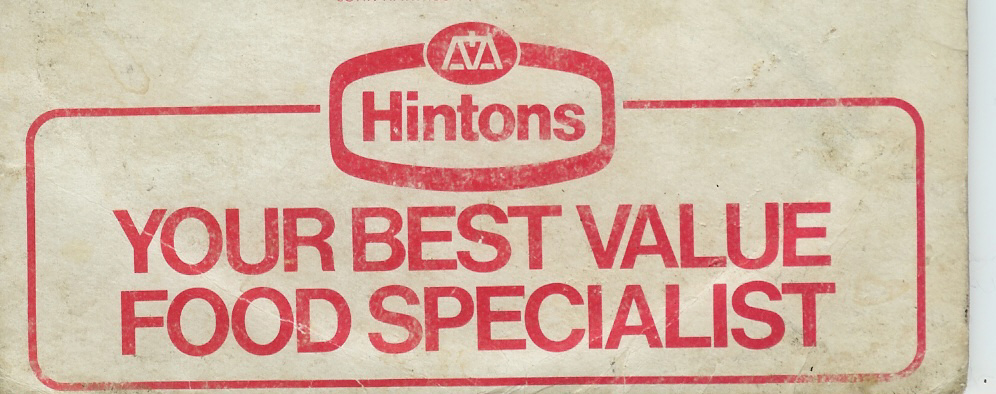
- Type: Public
- Industry: Food Retail
- Founded: 1871
- Defunct: 1984
- Fate: Acquired
- Successor: Presto Foodmarkets
- Headquarters: Thornaby-on-Tees, United Kingdom
- Products: Groceries
- Parent: Argyll Foods

Amos Hinton & Sons plc was a small supermarket company from the North East of England trading as Hintons, it was acquired in a takeover by Argyll Foods in 1984.

== History ==
=== Early years ===
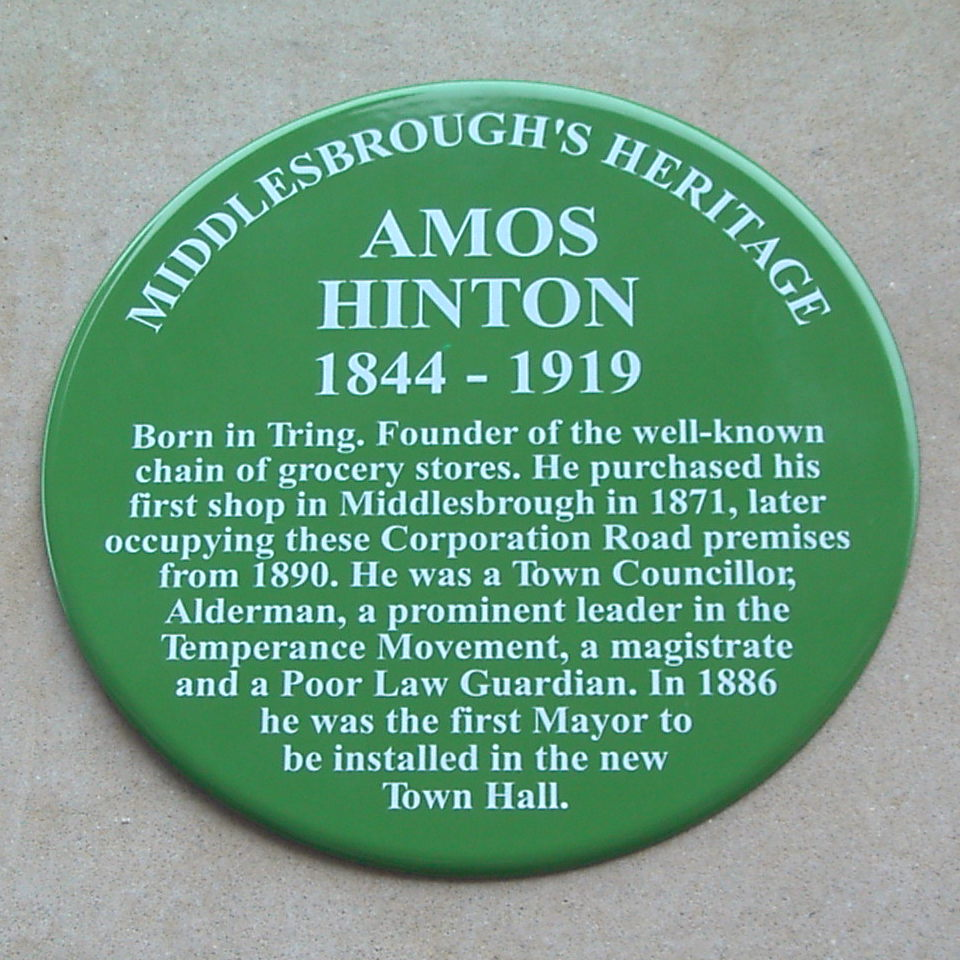
Amos Hinton remembered

The company was founded by Amos Hinton in Middlesbrough in 1871, when he bought out John Birks' shop in South Street. By 1919, the business had expanded such that it had seven stores on Teesside. It went on to buy Winterschladen, a chain of off licences.

=== Acquisition by Argyll Foods ===
The company was acquired by Argyll Foods for £25 million in 1984. At the time, the company traded from fifty five stores and thirty off licences. The head office had moved to Thornaby-on-Tees, where there was also limited warehousing. There was a distribution centre in Stockton-on-Tees, which is still used today by Morrisons. While Hintons own brand products were quickly replaced with Presto brands, the supermarkets continued to trade as Hintons for a short while, before all being converted to stores of Presto.

The new Hintons store in Guisborough (today a Morrisons) was one of the last to be launched with the Hintons name, the interior of the store having already been fitted out in the Presto format.

=== Disappearance ===
The Hintons name disappeared from all of the stores in the same week as the Presto brand was rolled out across Argyll's estate. The Winterschladen name continued to be used on the off licences for many years, until those stores were eventually sold and became Victoria Wine stores.
