= R & J Templeton =

1880–1919 Scottish convenience store company

R & J Templeton Ltd
- Industry: Grocery, General merchandise
- Founded: 1880
- Founder: Robert Templeton
- Fate: Acquired
- Successor: (1919) Shepherd's Dairies - a subsidiary of Home and Colonial Stores
- Headquarters: Glasgow, United Kingdom

R & J Templeton Ltd was founded in 1880 by Robert Templeton. R & J Templeton Ltd styled themselves as "Tea Merchants and Cash Grocers". By 1910 the company had built a network of 50 shops (40 of which were in Glasgow), usually they rented corner sites in poor districts. Their key grocery products were "dry goods" - tea, cereals, flour, jams and confectionery.

== Acquisition ==
The company was acquired in 1919 by Home and Colonial Stores Glasgow subsidiary Shepherd's Dairies for £132,045 eventually becoming part of the Allied Suppliers network.
