= Home and Colonial Stores =

British retail chain

- Type: Private
- Industry: Retail
- Founded: 1883
- Defunct: 1961 / 1972
- Fate: Name change/acquisition
- Successor: Allied Suppliers / Cavenham Foods
- Headquarters: London, UK
- Key people: Julius Drewe (founder); Sir Lancelot Royle (Chairman and CEO)

Home and Colonial Stores was once one of the United Kingdom's largest retail chains. Its formation of a vast chain of retail stores in the late 1920s is seen as the first step in the development of a UK food retail market dominated by a small number of food multiples.

== History ==
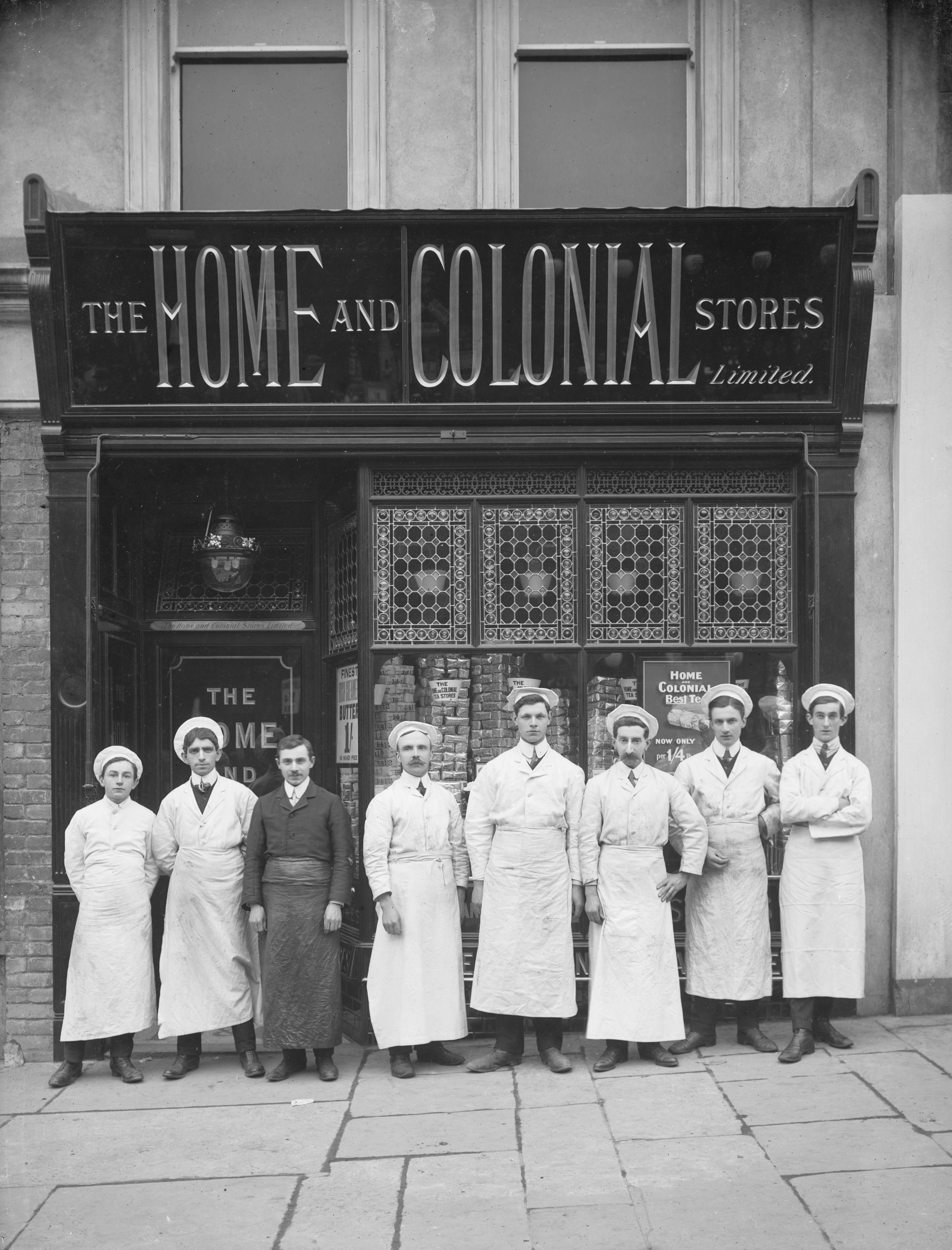
Shop assistants outside the Home and Colonial Stores on Broad Street, Waterford, May 1910

The business was founded by Julius Drewe (1856–1931), who went into partnership with John Musker in 1883, selling groceries at a small colonial goods store in Edgware Road in London. He subsequently opened stores in Islington, Birmingham and Leeds. The shops mainly sold tea; by 1885 they were trading as the 'Home & Colonial Tea Association'.

On the incorporation of the business in 1888, William Slaughter took over as chairman. By the turn of the century the company had over 100 stores; by 1903, it had 500.

Home and Colonial bought the share capital of Maypole Dairies of Wolverhampton from the Watson family in 1924. Between 1924 and 1931, several stores, including Liptons, merged with Home and Colonial to form a company with over 3,000 branches. Within this period of rapid change, Home and Colonial formed Allied Suppliers to act as a buyer on behalf of the whole group.

From 1948 until 1964, the group Chairman and CEO was Sir Lancelot Royle, KBE. He had joined the group in 1928. By 1955, the company was ranked 27th-largest in UK.

By 1960, Home & Colonial Stores Ltd was still a major force in the UK food industry. With retail operations in the UK and abroad and factories in the UK, it was able to report a 10% rise in profits to £4,033,057.

By 1961, reflecting the end of the British Empire, the group had restyled itself under the name of the company it created in 1929, Allied Suppliers. Early in 1972, Allied was acquired by Cavenham Foods, formed eight years previously by British tycoon James Goldsmith. The business purchased the South East-based supermarket chain Cater Brothers from Debenhams in 1979, and converted the stores into its Presto brand.

By 1981, Allied had a turnover of £800 million. In the following year it was acquired by James Gulliver's Argyll Foods; five years later Argyll merged with Safeway UK.

== In literature ==
Home and Colonial was one of three stores immortalised in a verse in John Betjeman's poem "Myfanwy":

Smooth down the Avenue glitters the bicycle,
Black-stockinged legs under navy blue serge,
Home and Colonial, Star, International,
Balancing bicycle leant on the verge.

In Dorothy L. Sayers' novel Busman's Honeymoon (1937), the Home and Colonial network is mentioned as operating in the small Hertfordshire village where the book's plot is set, indicating its wide reach at the time of writing. A local woman tells Lord Peter Wimsey's servant Bunter that groceries sold by the "Ome & Colonial" are better and cheaper than those provided by the village grocer. This seems to refer to a delivery van rather than a local branch, since another local says that the Home and Colonial "don't get here till past eleven," and Bunter later says he "succeeded in intercepting the Home & Colonial" to purchase something.
