= Cater Brothers =

Former British supermarket chain

- Industry: Grocers
- Founder: Henry John Cater
- Defunct: 1979
- Fate: Purchased by Allied Suppliers and converted to Presto
- Successor: Presto
- Area served: United Kingdom
- Key people: Leslie Erastus Cater
- Revenue: £54 million (1978)

Cater Brothers was a supermarket chain based in the South East of England. The business started out in the 19th century as a butchers, before progressing into the grocery business. The company opened their first self-service supermarket in 1958. Ownership changed hands twice during the 1970s, firstly being purchased by Debenhams, before they sold the business in 1979 to Allied Suppliers, the grocery store concern of Cavenham Foods. The business was quickly integrated into Allied's chain of supermarkets, Presto.

== History ==
Cater Brothers Supermarkets was a natural progression for a family of butchers and greengrocers. Henry Charles Cater (1818-1868) was a pork merchant and latterly a pork butcher in the East End of London. Three of his four sons went on to become a cheesemonger, a grocer and a provisions merchant.

Henry John Cater, one of Henry Charles's sons, is shown in the 1881 census as being a grocer in Bridge Street, Mile End. It was his five sons who took the business over after his death in 1919, with his son Erastus being appointed chairman of the board. By the start of the Second World War the business had around 30 stores.

In 1956, Leslie Erastus, son of Erastus, had taken over the running of the business and was keen to move the company into the new self-service supermarket business. The first supermarket was opened in Bromley in 1958, with branches being added across the South East at a rate of around one a year. The new chain had stores as far away as Reading and Colchester, all supplied by a depot in Dagenham.

In April 1972, Leslie Erastus was killed when a plane, piloted by rival supermarket owner Francis John Wallis of Wallis Supermarkets, crashed in the French Alps. Cater's estate was valued at £91,747. After his death, the Cater family decided to accept an offer of £7 million for the business from Debenhams, in 1973.

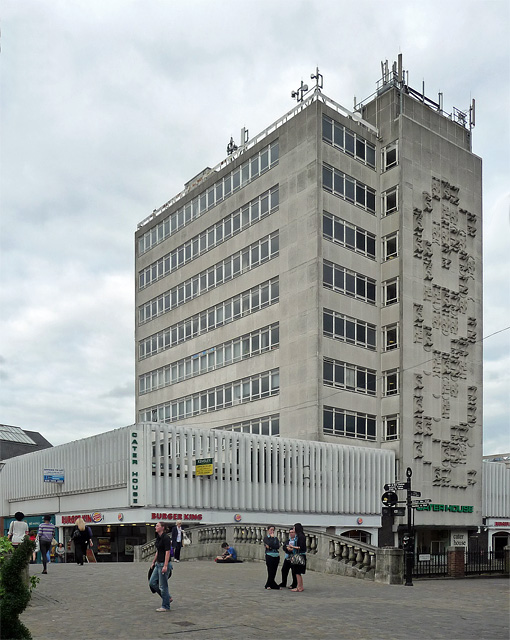
Former Cater House site in Chelmsford

Debenhams integrated the business with their 40 food halls, which were modernised and branded as Cater Food Halls and opened a further two new Cater supermarkets. However the business struggled in the competitive 1970s market, and was sold of in 1979, and had lost £975,000 in 1977 and £383,000 in 1978 on a turnover of £54 million. Debenhams sold the business and its 24 stores to Cavenham Foods subsidiary Allied Suppliers for £9.5 million. Allied Suppliers integrated the new stores into their Presto chain and the Cater Brothers brand was no more. The Cater name, however, lived on longer in Chelmsford, with an office block that was built above the store carrying the Cater House name until it was converted into residential flats and renamed Canside in 2014.

== Branches ==
- Altrincham
- Basildon
- Bath
- Bedford
- Bow
- Bromley
- Canning Town
- Catford
- Croydon
- Chelmsford
- Colchester
- Edmonton
- Eltham
- Greenwich
- Hitchin
- Holloway
- Kingston
- Morden
- Nuneaton
- Putney
- Reading
- St Albans
- Southend
- Watford
- Wood Green
