= Safeway (UK) =

British chain of supermarkets and convenience stores

Safeway Limited
- Formerly: Boydbrush Limited (1977–1977); Argyll Group plc (1977–1996); Safeway plc (1996–2004)
- Industry: Groceries; General merchandise
- Founded: 1962; 2016 (brand relaunch)
- Defunct: 24 November 2005
- Fate: Defunct: purchased by Morrisons and rebranded; currently exists as a grocery brand
- Successor: Morrisons
- Headquarters: London, England
- Area served: United Kingdom
- Key people: David Webster (Chairman); Carlos Criado-Perez (CEO)
- Parent: Morrisons

Safeway Limited is a British groceries brand, and former chain of supermarkets and convenience shops. The British Safeway was founded in 1962 by the American Safeway Inc., before being sold to Argyll Foods in 1987. It was purchased by Morrisons in March 2004. Most of its 479 shops were rebranded as Morrisons, with others being sold. Safeway-branded shops disappeared from the United Kingdom on 24 November 2005.

In November 2016, Morrisons revived the Safeway brand for a range of products, manufactured in the company's own factories, for distribution through UK independent retailers.

== History ==
=== Early years ===
Safeway Food Stores was established in 1962 in the United Kingdom by the American supermarket chain Safeway, with seven supermarkets and a few smaller stores in Greater London, and its first purpose-built store was opened in Bedford in 1963. It brought many ideas from the US, including larger stores with wider aisles and delicatessens, and a much wider range of products. By 1987, it had 133 shops around the United Kingdom.

=== Acquisition by Argyll Foods ===
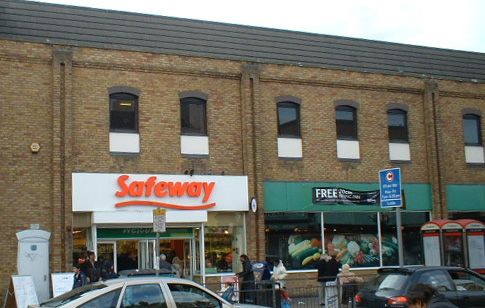
A Safeway supermarket in Walworth in 2003

In 1987, Safeway Inc. put its British operations up for sale. Argyll Foods eventually secured it for the sum of £681 million, with £600 million raised through a rights issue that was three times oversubscribed.

Argyll then began converting the larger Presto supermarkets to the Safeway brand. The Presto name continued on smaller supermarkets in North East England and Scotland for several years and even enjoyed a brief revival in the early 1990s, when several new Presto shops began to open and a range of Presto own label products was introduced. The last new Presto shops opened in 1995. The revival was short lived, as in 1995, many smaller Presto shops were sold to a consortium of SPAR retailers.

Over the next few years, competitive pressures intensified. Pre tax profits fell by 13% during the year ended 30 April 1994, prompting a wide-ranging strategic review known as "Safeway 2000", led by the then chief executive, Colin Smith, with assistance from McKinsey Consulting. This involved the sale of the Lo-Cost chain to Co-operative Retail Services and the redesign of Safeway shops to appeal to the family shopper.

In July 1996, Argyll conducted a share buyback and renamed itself Safeway plc. During 1997, several Presto stores were converted to Safeways, and by the beginning of 1998, the final Presto shops were either converted or closed down.

David Webster, who had taken over as chairman in 1997, after the retirement of Alistair Grant, decided to open merger talks with Asda. These talks were called off after a few weeks following a leak to a Sunday newspaper, and then briefly revived in the early months of 1998, before breaking down again.

The outcome, if the negotiations had been successful, would probably have been the disappearance of the Safeway name and the emergence of a stronger Asda, still focusing on discount prices, but with a bigger volume to support it. This might have achieved a more secure future for Safeway, than continuing the struggle to keep up with Tesco and Sainsbury's.

Safeway was the first of the large supermarket groups to introduce a loyalty card, Added Bonus Card (ABC), which launched in 1995.

Safeway was also the first UK supermarket to introduce customer self-scan in 1995. The technology was developed by Symbol Technologies and previous trials had taken place by Albert Heijn in the Netherlands. By 1998 the system was available in 150 stores.

Safeway, in 1999, started a rail container flow carrying goods to its far north shops, some as far as Inverness, Nairn, Elgin and Buckie. The train consisted of van wagons and containers. The train was operated by EWS.

=== "New Safeway" ===
By early 1999 Safeway was coming under renewed criticism from investors. Its shares had under-performed in the food sector over the previous five years. It had been pushed back into fourth position by Asda and it did not have enough shops of adequate size to offer a comprehensive non-food range. In July 1999, Safeway announced the appointment of a new chief executive, Carlos Criado-Perez, who had held senior posts in Wal-Mart's international division.

The problem was how to distinguish Safeway from Tesco and Sainsbury's, and how to minimise its scale disadvantage. According to estimates made by the Competition Commission, Tesco was able to negotiate significantly lower prices from its suppliers than Safeway – averaging about 3% on big selling branded items.

Criado-Perez's response was to introduce selective deep discounting, the so-called high/low pricing formula, which was later branded as 'substantially discredited' by Morrisons management, making deep price cuts on a limited set of products for a limited period. Criado-Perez also abandoned Safeway's loyalty card, arguing that these cards were no longer an effective marketing tool. This project was branded 'New Safeway'.

In 2002, Safeway was the fourth largest supermarket chain by sales in the United Kingdom.

=== Morrisons takeover ===
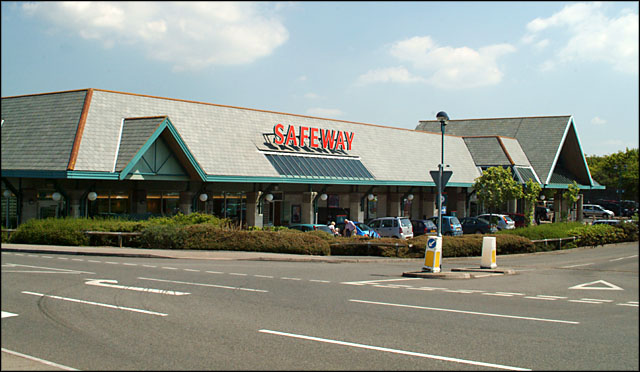
A larger Safeway supermarket in Bude, Cornwall in 2005, after the purchase of the chain by Morrisons.

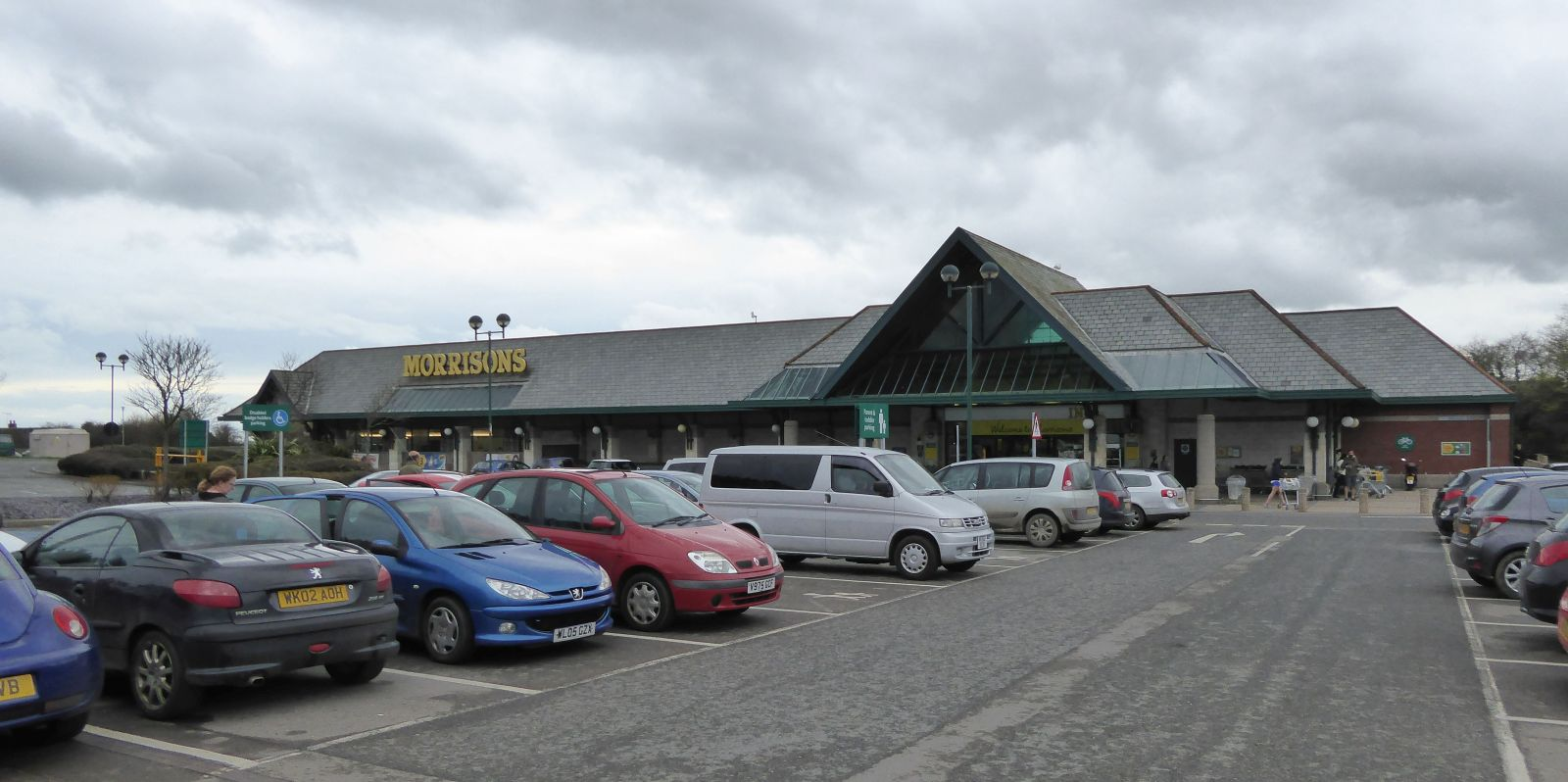
The same building in 2016, now as a branch of Morrisons.

On 9 January 2003, the much smaller Morrisons, with around 119 shops largely located in the North of England, made a surprise offer to purchase the chain, offering 1.32 new shares of Morrisons for each share of Safeway, with the co-operation of the Safeway board. This served to start a stampede of other potential buyers. Sainsbury's, Asda, KKR (the company which helped finance the sale of Safeway to Argyll in 1987), Trackdean Investments Limited (controlled by Philip Green, owner of BHS and Arcadia) and Tesco all said they were considering making offers.

They were all asked to make submissions to the Office of Fair Trading (OFT) for approval under the Fair Trading Act 1973. On 23 January, Safeway's board dropped its recommendation of the Morrisons offer. KKR later dropped its proposal. On 19 March, the remaining proposals except for Trackdean's (which was said to raise no competition issues) were referred to the Competition Commission by the Trade and Industry Secretary, Patricia Hewitt. The report of the Competition Commission was made public on 26 September.

A takeover of Safeway by Sainsbury's, Asda or Tesco was "expected to operate against the public interest, and should be prohibited". However, a takeover by Morrisons was held to be acceptable on the condition that 53 shops of the combined operation be sold, due to local competition issues. Patricia Hewitt accepted these recommendations.

Philip Green announced on 30 October that he was not proceeding with a takeover bid, on the basis that it was not clear whether approval could be obtained to sell off individual shops to other chains. On 15 December, Morrisons, the only remaining bidder, made a new offer of one share of Morrisons, plus sixty pence for each Safeway share, again with the co-operation of the Safeway board. On 11 February 2004, shareholders of both Wm Morrison and Safeway voted to approve the merger of the two companies, subject to the result of two High Court rulings later in the month.

=== Shop disposals ===
Originally, 52 shops were to be compulsorily divested after the takeover, but this was reduced to 50 after one shop in Sunderland burned down and the lease ended on another in Leeds city centre. John Lewis Partnership purchased 19 to be part of its Waitrose chain, while Sainsbury's purchased a further 14 , and Tesco bought 10 in October 2004.

Unlike other operators, most notably Tesco, Sainsbury's and the Co-op, Morrisons had chosen not to move into the convenience shop sector. Further to this policy decision, it was announced in October 2004 that the 114 smaller shops of Safeway Compact were to be sold off to rival supermarket chain Somerfield, in a two part deal worth £260.2 million in total.

In Northern Ireland, Morrisons sold former Safeway shops to Asda. These included a shop in Bangor, which actually opened after the takeover by Morrisons, in June 2005.

One of the largest single purchases in 2005 was that of five shops by Waitrose in August. On 18 July 2005, a further six shops were sold to Waitrose, including the former Safeway shop in Hexham, Northumberland, which became the most northerly Waitrose branch in England.

In May 2005, Morrisons announced the termination of Safeway's joint-venture forecourt shop/petrol station format with BP. Under the deal, the premises were split 50/50 between the two companies. Five sites were subsequently sold on to BP, while Morrisons sold the rest of its sites to Somerfield and Tesco, which both maintain a presence in this market sector. Following the termination of the BP/Safeway deal, BP began to roll out Marks and Spencer food forecourt shops in their place from 2005, with the network expanding over subsequent years.

Morrisons also sold Safeway's Channel Islands shops, in Guernsey and Jersey, to CI Traders, where they continued to trade under the Safeway brand name, despite selling products from chains such as Iceland. In February 2011, CI Traders sold the Safeway shops on the Channel Islands to Waitrose and the Safeway brand disappeared from the Channel Islands.

On the Isle of Man, the Douglas shop was sold to Shoprite and the Ramsey shop was sold to the Co-op. The shop in Gibraltar was originally marketed for sale, but was then converted. In November 2005, plans were submitted for the extension and redevelopment of the shop, in order to introduce the full Morrisons format.

In September 2005, the company announced the closure of former Safeway depots in Kent, Bristol and Warrington, with the loss of around 2,500 jobs. The Kent depot was later sold to Waitrose, whilst the Warrington depot was sold to Iceland. Part of the Bristol depot was sold off to Gist. The shop conversion process was completed on 24 November 2005, when the last Safeway fascia disappeared from the United Kingdom.

=== Competition law ===
In 2010, when Safeway had been fined for breach of UK competition law, the Court of Appeal ruled that the company could not recover the costs of a fine by charging the costs to the company directors or to the staff who were involved in the legal infringement which had led to the fine being charged.

=== Partial brand revival ===
In November 2016, Morrisons announced a revival of the Safeway brand, on food products that it manufactures for retailers. This was followed by McColl's signing an agreement to stock Safeway-branded products in its nationwide chain of small-format convenience stores in August 2017. A trial of a branded Safeway Daily convenience store was unveiled at a petrol station forecourt in Derby during 2019.

Safeway logo history

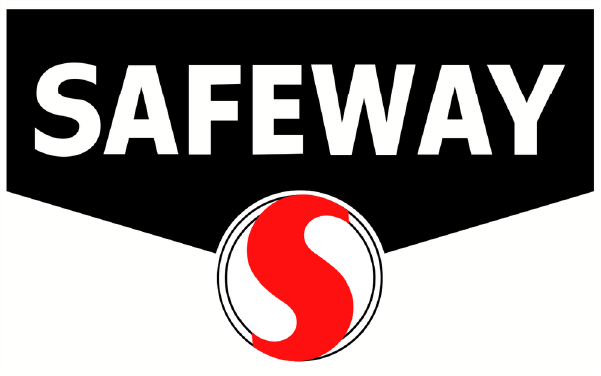
1962–1981: First Safeway logo

1981–1987: Second Safeway logo

1987–2000: Third Safeway logo

2000–2004: Fourth Safeway logo

=== Slogans ===
- "A little bit more" (used until the late 1980s)
- "Everything you want from a store and a little bit more" (late 1980s-1991)
- "Where good value comes naturally" (1991–1995)
- "Lightening the load" (1995–1999)
- "More reasons to shop at Morrisons & Safeway" (Morrisons acquisition, 2004–2005)

== See also ==
- List of supermarket chains in the United Kingdom
