= General line of merchandise =

Retail term

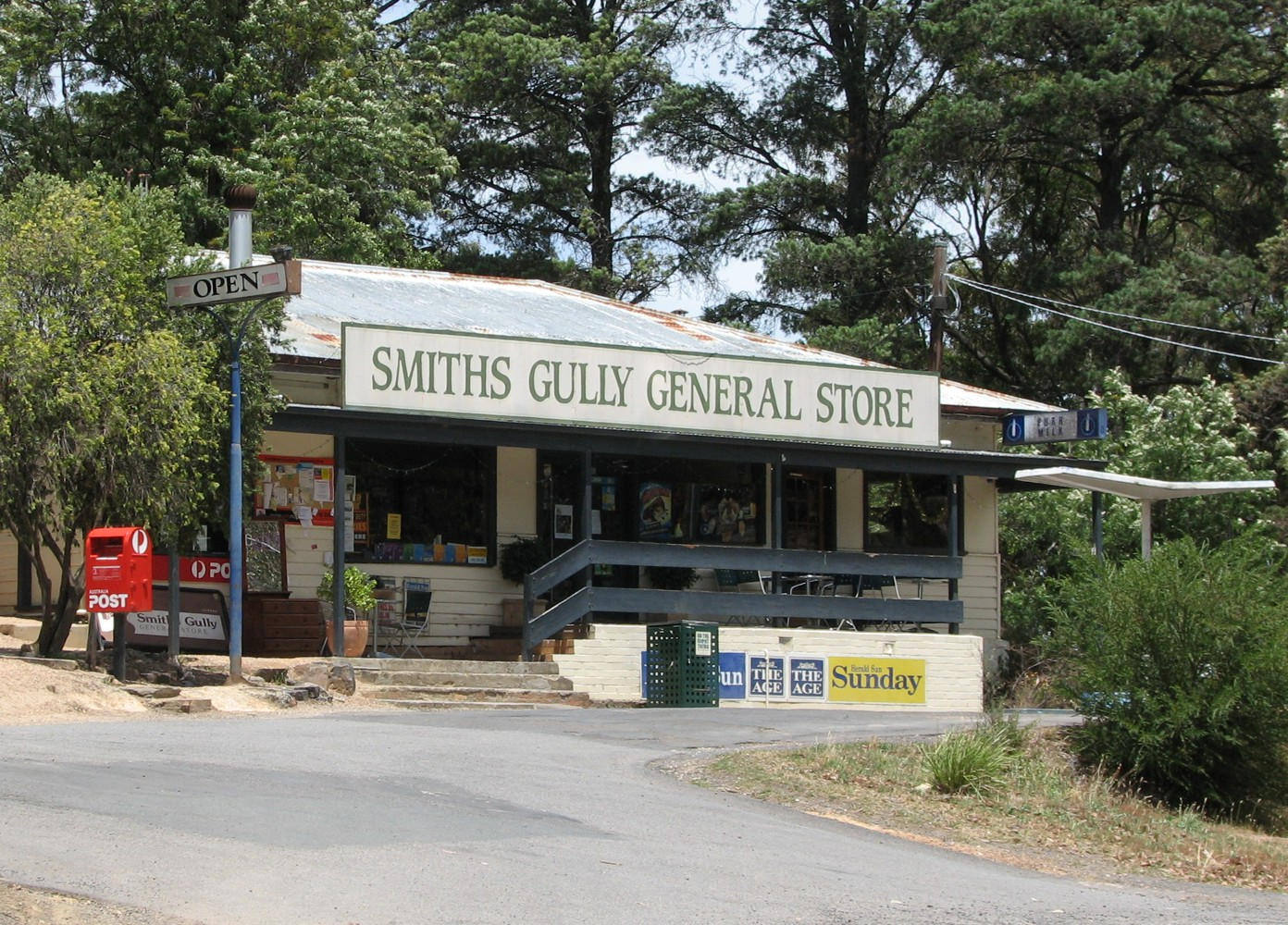
A typical rural general store

General line of merchandise or general merchandise is a term used in retail and wholesale business in reference to merchandise not limited to some particular category. General merchandise stores (general stores) address this sector of retail.

According to the North American Industry Classification System 2002, the following types of general merchandise are excluded from the line carried by general stores:

- general line of building and home improvement materials (44411, Home Centres)
- general line of grocery items (44511, Supermarkets and Other Grocery (except Convenience) Stores)
- general line of used goods (45331, Used Merchandise Stores)

Regardless of this classification system, general stores indeed carry basic grocery items, often limited produce, basic hardware and gardening tools, and other necessaries of rural life.

== See also ==
- Convenience store
