= List of supermarket chains in the United Kingdom =

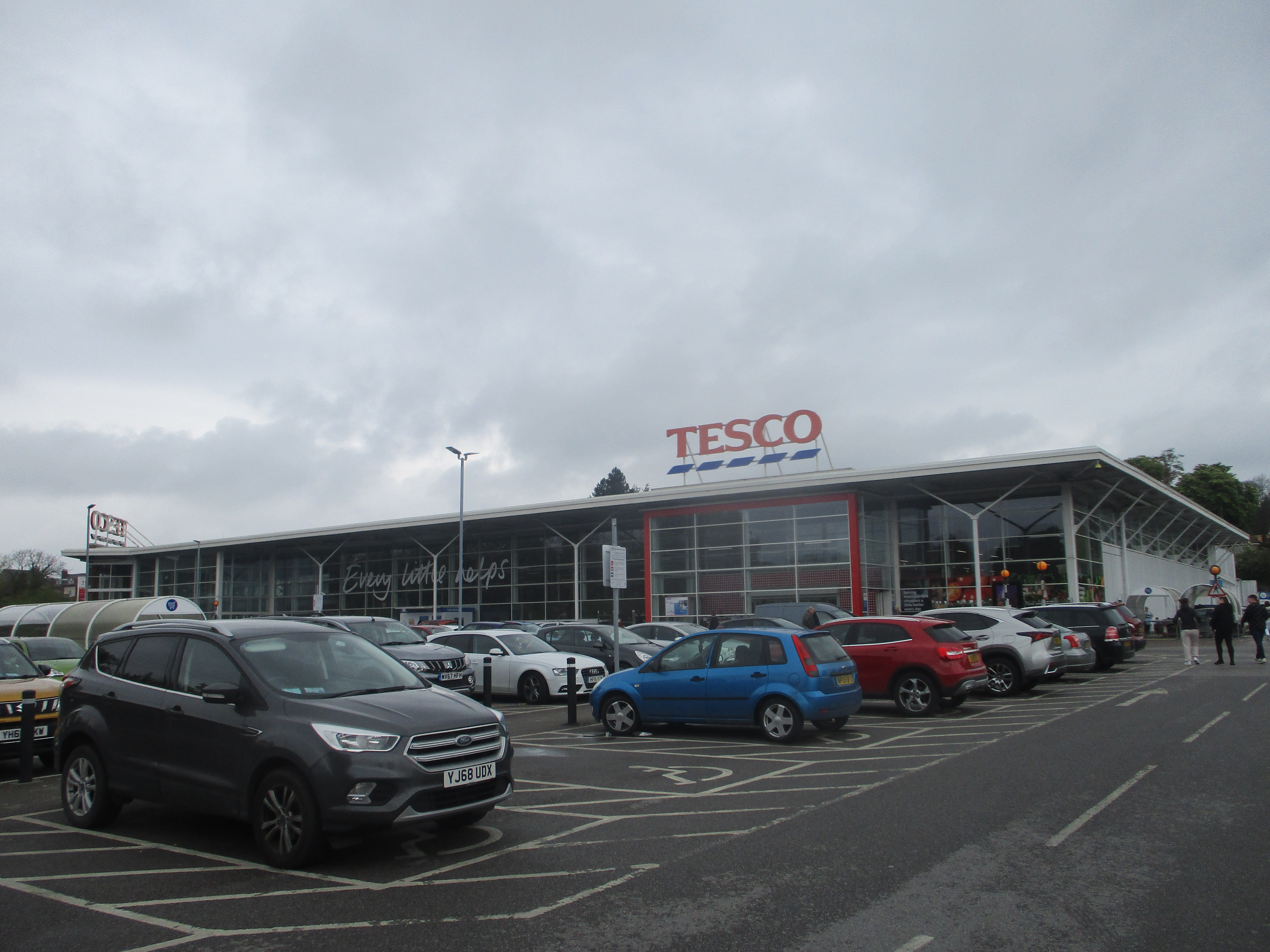
Tesco is the largest supermarket chain in the United Kingdom.

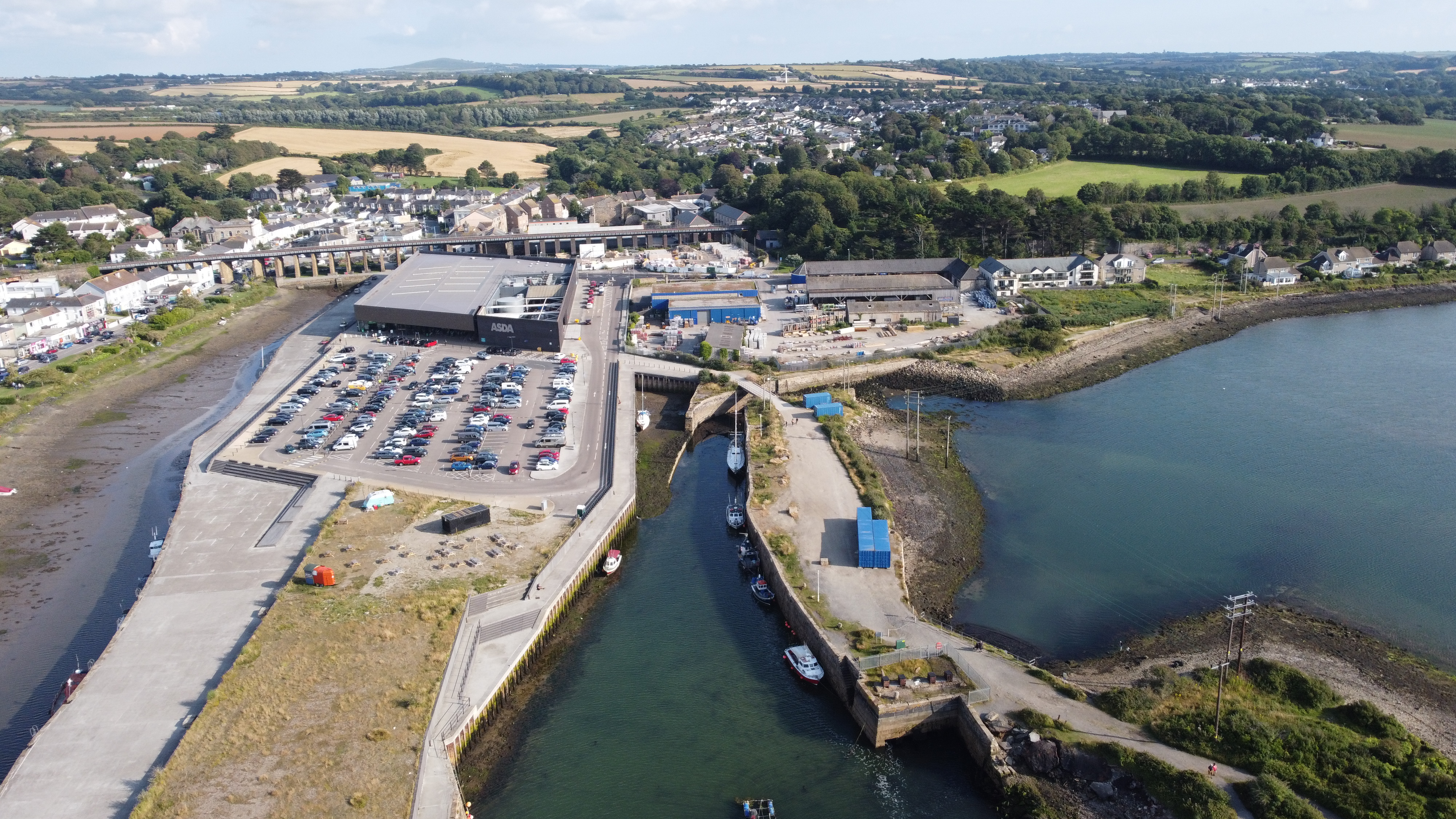
Hayle harbour and ASDA supermarket, Cornwall

As of November 2024, there are 17 supermarket chains currently operating in the United Kingdom. The food retail market has been dominated by the 'big four' supermarkets – Tesco, Sainsbury's, Asda and Morrisons – which made up more than three quarters of sector market share in 2010. Tesco is the largest retailer in Great Britain, with a market share of 28.5% at the start of 2025. (Note: Figure based on 12 weeks ending 26 January 2025.)

However, discounters Lidl and Aldi have grown rapidly. A number of sources reported that in September 2022, Aldi overtook Morrisons to become Great Britain's fourth largest grocery retailer. At the end of 2022, Morrisons and Aldi both remained at 9.1%. (Note: Figure based on 12 weeks ending 25 December 2022.) Collectively, the big four accounted for two thirds and the big four and discounters combined for five sixths of the grocery market share at the start of 2025. (Note: Figure based on 12 weeks ending 26 January 2025.)

Northern Ireland has similar major chains. In 2022, Tesco was the largest retailer in NI, followed by Sainsbury's, Asda and Lidl. However, the market is different because some chains are not shared between the different parts of the UK. For example, Aldi and Morrisons do not operate there.

== Historical background ==
Before 1932, British grocery stores operated as counter service; however, that year David Greig opened the first self-service grocery store in the UK at Turnpike Lane, Hornsey, but the store, although a success, was closed down after eight months of the experiment. The first permanent self-service grocery store in the United Kingdom was opened 12 January 1948 in Manor Park, London by the Co-op, with Tesco opening its first self-service grocery store and Marks & Spencer starting a trial of self-service in the same year. Sainsbury’s opened its first self-service branch in Croydon in 1950. By 1951, the Co-op had 604 self-service stores. In the same year, Express Dairies opened Britain's first supermarket under the Premier Supermarket brand in Streatham, South London, while the first Fine Fare was opened as a single supermarket later that year, as an offshoot of the Welwyn Department Store.

Waitrose opened its first supermarket in Streatham during 1955, although its first self service store had opened at its subsidiary Schofield & Martin in 1951. Tesco, though, did not open its first supermarket until 1956 in Maldon, Essex, while Morrisons was not until 1961, and Asda was not until 1963. By 1959, multiple grocery retailers accounted for only 10% of grocery outlets and 25% of the British market; however, by a decade later the expansion of supermarkets had seen them take 41% of all grocery turnover. The growth of the supermarket is also shown in store numbers, with Britain having only 175 supermarkets in 1958, but this had expanded to 2,803 by 1967. Britain's first out of town supermarket was opened by American retailer GEM in West Bridgford, Nottinghamshire in November 1964.

== List of current UK supermarket chains ==
Chain operators	Logo	Est.	Owned by	Based in	Market share (%)				Store count	Brands	Notes
Chain operators	Logo	Est.	Owned by	Based in	2025	2015	2007	2000	Store count	Brands	Notes
Aldi UK		1990	Aldi Süd GmbH	Atherstone	10.8	5.6	2.6	1.5	1,112	Aldi; Aldi Local	No frills supermarket
Amazon Fresh UK		2021	Amazon	London	–	-	–	–	19		Cashierless store, closed in late 2025
Asda		1963	TDR Capital (67.5%); Mohsin Issa (22.5%); Walmart (10%)	Leeds	12.6	16.4	16.6	14.1	1,106	Asda Express; Asda Living; Asda On the Move; Asda Supercentre; Asda Supermarket; Asda Superstore	Founded by merger of Queens (owned by the Asquith family) and Associated Dairies.
Booths	Booths Central Office – geograph.org.uk – 1369512	1847	Booth Family and staff	Preston	-	-	–	–	26		Only operating in northern England
Co-op Food		1844	Various consumers' co-operatives and The Co-op Group	Manchester (The Co-op Group)	5.2	6.3	4.4	5.4	2,500	Co-op; Co-op On the Go; Nisa Express; Nisa Local; Nisa Extra; Welcome	About 16 retail co-operatives with a shared Identity, the six largest are: OurCoop (Central); Co-op Group; East of England; Lincolnshire; Scotmid; Southern; See also: The Co-operative Group § List of corporate members
Farmfoods		1954	UK private company	Cumbernauld	-	-	0.5	–	340		Started as a meat processing business in Aberdeen in 1954. Primarily focused on Frozen foods Opened first retail outlet in the 1970s also in Aberdeen.
Heron Foods		1979	B&M	Melton	-	-	–	–	290	Heron Foods; B&M Express	Primarily frozen foods; concentrated mainly in the Midlands and the North. Heron Foods was bought in 2017 with some stores re-branded to B&M Express since 2018.
Iceland		1970	The Walker and Dhaliwal families	Deeside	2.4	-	1.6	2.8	1,030	Iceland; Iceland Local; The Food Warehouse	First store opened at Oswestry, Shropshire in 1970
Lidl GB & NI		1994	Lidl Stiftung & Co. KG	Kingston upon Thames	8.2	4.4	2.2	1.3	1,062		No frills supermarket
Marks & Spencer		1884	Publicly traded on the London Stock Exchange	London	4.2	-	4.3	–	852		Clothing and food retailer
Morrisons		1899	Clayton, Dubilier & Rice	Bradford	8.6	10.8	11.2	4.9	542	Morrisons; Morrisons Superstore; Morrisons Daily; Morrisons Select	From 2011 to 2015 also operated M Local (later MyLocal) convenience stores.
Ocado		2002	Publicly traded on the London Stock Exchange	Hatfield	1.9	-	–	–	0		Online only, product supply partnership with M&S.
Oseyo		2015	UK private company	Kingston upon Thames	-	-	–	–	20		Asian goods chain; such as from Korean, Japanese, Chinese, Thai and Indian.
Sainsbury's		1869	Publicly traded on the London Stock Exchange	London	15.9	16.6	16.2	17.9	1,430	Sainsbury's; Sainsbury's Superstore; Sainsbury's Local	
Tesco		1919	Publicly traded on the London Stock Exchange	Welwyn Garden City	28.5	27.9	31.6	25.0	2,932 (UK)	Tesco; Tesco Superstore; Tesco Extra; Tesco Express; One Stop	Shoprite was bought in 2023 and branding phased. From May 2021, Tesco Metro stores were phased out and re-branded as Tesco Express or Tesco. Tesco purchased Booker Group in 2018, the group includes Budgens as well as Londis, Premier, and Family Shopper symbol groups.
Waitrose & Partners		1904	John Lewis Partnership	Bracknell	4.6	5.2	3.9	2.7	344	Waitrose; Little Waitrose; John Lewis Foodhall; Food, Fashion & Home; Food & Home; Welcome Break outlets (motorway services)	
Wing Yip		1970	UK private company	Birmingham	-	-	-	-	5	Wing Yip; Wing Yip DiDi	Asian supermarket chain focused on Chinese goods.

== List of defunct UK supermarket chains ==
These supermarkets are either no longer trading, have been renamed, or have been taken over and re-branded.

Chain operators	Est.	Fate	Closed	Notes
Adsega	1960	Bought by Tesco	1965	Formed by Martin Green and Henry Seaberg. North East England based, had budget model and around 50 stores. It was purchased by Tesco in 1965 for slightly more than £1 million.
Ailsa Superstores	1970s			Small chain of Scotland-based supermarkets, owned by Allied Suppliers (51%) and Goldberg Department Stores (49%).
AJ & M Freezer Foods		Purchased by Iceland		Newcastle-upon-Tyne based freezer food chain.
APT Stores				Small supermarket chain with the catchphrase The Store with More.
Axe Stores				Created in 1976 by Italian supermarket chain PAM with British partner Hintons, the partner was bought by PAM in 1978. The 15 stores were bought by the management team in 1987. The company used the slogan Axe – Cut of Value.
Bateman & Sons		Bought by Booker Group and merged into Budgens.	1973	Chain of 31 supermarkets and 17 self-service stores based in South Wales.
Bejam	1968	Bought by Iceland	1989	Frozen food chain started by John Apthorp in London, it grew became the biggest frozen food, freezer and microwave seller in the United Kingdom. The business was bought by Iceland after a hostile bid.
Big W	1998	Discontinued, re-branded as Woolworths	2004	21-megastores chain started by Kingfisher plc, to include all the products of its chains, Woolworths, B&Q, Comet and Superdrug. Seven stores sold groceries via a partnership deal with Booker Group and were sold to Asda and Tesco; the remaining 14 stores re-branded and downsized under the regular Woolworths banner.
Bishops Stores		Bought by Budgens	1984	63 stores in south east England.
Bonimart Freezer Centre	1981	Purchased by Argyll Foods and added to Cordon Bleu chain.		
BP Safeway	1998	Dissolved	2004	Joint venture between Safeway and BP that operated forecourt convenience stores. Morrisons bought Safeway in 2004 and the partnership was dissolved. Morrisons then had no plans to enter into the convenience store market and, in September 2005, Morrisons sold twenty-one of the sites to Tesco for conversion to Tesco Express stores. The other nine reverted to BP ownership through a Right of first refusal and five of the nine were later sold to Somerfield.
Brian Ford's Discount Store	1975	Bought by Tesco in 2004	2010	Opened by Brian Ford after the sale of the family Ford & Lock business to Gateway in 1974. The business opened in the former Deveres Kensington engineering building in Barnstaple, Devon expanding with an extension in 1981. The business was based on the 'cash & carry' principle. The business was purchased by Tesco in 2004, with the store closing in June 2010 after permission was granted to demolish the site and build a Tesco Extra in its place.
Brierleys Supermarkets		Went into receivership in 1974. Superseded by Hillyards supermarket		Small supermarket chain founded by Frank Brierley, a former market trader in Northamptonshire, offering very low prices with a moderate choice of products; on occasions the owner would set up a market stall right in the middle of the supermarket. Launched an own brand range with the pirate logo.
Budgens	1872	Became a convenience store symbol group		Grocery store chain, that was initially based in the South East of England. Owned by several companies, including Booker Group on two occasions, the business left the supermarket trade under the ownership of the Musgrave Group to concentrate on convenience stores before becoming a symbol group.
Burton Supermarkets		Bought by Fine Fare		Small Nottinghamshire based supermarket chain purchased by Fine Fare and re-branded.
Capital Freezer Centres		Bought by Farmfoods		Chain of freezer stores located in England and Scotland; owned by United Biscuits since 1979; a management buyout happened in 1989.
J.C. Carline		Bought by Associated British Foods, re-branded as Fine Fare		Supermarket chain of around 40 stores owned by grocers William Cussons. Cussons were purchased by Great Universal Stores in 1962. The business was sold to Associated British Foods and integrated into its subsidiary Fine Fare.
Carrefour	1970s	Exited out of UK market, sold to Gateway/Somerfield, then later to Asda	1990	French retailer went into partnership with Wheatsheaf Distribution & Trading Ltd.
Cartier's Superfoods	1969	Bought by Tesco	1979	Small Kent based supermarket chain started by Lewis Cartier in 1969, the chain was taken over by Tesco for £19.4 million.
Cater Brothers	1881	Became part of Presto	1979	Henry John Cater founded the grocery and provisions business in Mile End, London 1881. Cater Brothers was a South East-based chain. When its first supermarket (Bromley, Kent) opened in 1958, it was the largest in the UK. In 1972, it was bought out by Debenhams after the death of the chairman Leslie Cater in the same plane crash that killed F J Wallis. In 1979, Debenhams sold the chain to Allied Suppliers, which re-branded the stores under its Presto brand.
Cave Austin and Company	1896	Taken over by Burton, Son and Sanders in 1963. Purchased by Moore Stores in 1966.	1966	Cave Austin and Co., Ltd was a chain of Grocery Stores and Cafés in the South East of England. At its height, there were more than fifty branches over South-East London, North-East London, Kent, and Surrey as well as cafés in many major South Coast resorts such Deal in Kent and St Leonards-on-Sea and Hastings in Sussex.
Cee N'Cee	Late 1950s	Purchased by Kwik Save in 1978.	1978	Discount supermarket started in Kidsgrove by Alex Humphries, who sold the 49 store chain to Kwik Save in 1978.
Challenge Supermarket		Became part of Frank Dee		Supermarket based in Yorkshire owned by Wheatsheaf and Distribution & Trading Ltd, that was purchased by Frank Dee in the 1980s and incorporated into the chain.
Clifford Dunn Supermarkets				Started out as Savemore Stores, but was rebranded under the chain's creator name, with stores based in the Humberside area.
Cooltrader		Bought by Heron Foods	2017	Opened in Wrexham, founded by Iceland founder Malcolm Walker. Cooltrader became part of Iceland after Malcolm Walker's takeover of that business, then sold in 2012 to Heron Foods. The location In Shrewsbury retained the cooltrader branding until its closure in 2023.
Coopers & Co		Bought by Fine Fare	1955	Scotland based supermarket and grocers chain bought by Fine Fare and re-branded as Coopers Fine Fare.
Cordon Bleu Freezer Food Centres	1970	Purchased by Argyll Supplies		Chain of freezer shops started by W N Cassell in 1970, before being purchased by Argyll Supplies subsidiary Louis C Edwards; several chains were purchased and added by Argyll to form second largest freezer chain after Bejam; stores were re-branded under the Lo-cost or Presto name.
Crazy Prices		Bought by Tesco		Associated British Foods owned Northern Ireland group
Curleys Supermarkets and wine cellars	1960s	Supermarkets were sold to Sainsburys in 2008 and the remaining 11 Wine Cellars to WineFlair seven years later in 2015	Stores (2009) Wine Cellars (2017)	Chain of supermarkets and wine stores in Northern Ireland.
Dalgety Freezer Centres		Bought by James Gullivers Argyll Supplies		38 freezer centre bought by James Gulliver and added to Argyll Supplies Cordon Bleu business.
Danish Food Centre				
David Greig	1870	Bought by Fitch Lovell	Late 1970s	Grocery store chain started in South London, that in 1972 became part of Wrensons. The Wrensons business was renamed David Greig in 1973. The business was nearly sold to Combined English Stores, but it withdrew its bid after concerns regarding the company's finances, and it was eventually sold to Fitch Lovell. Fitch Lovell sold off many of the stores to recoup the purchase price, and in the late 1970s merged the firm into its Keymarkets business.
DEE Discount Stores		Re-branded as Gateway Foodmarkets, later Somerfield now owned by Co-op		Chain of supermarkets based in North East of England; parent company Linfood Holdings purchased the smaller Gateway chain and re-branded stores as Gateway Foodmarkets and the parent company as Dee Corporation.
Dewhurst Freezer Food Centres				Chain of 52 freezer stores.
Dickie's Discount		Bought by Linfood & Oriel Foods and split up	1977	Early discount supermarket chain with stores in locations such as Exeter and Hastings. In 1977, both Linfood and Oriel Foods purchased the business, with 11 stores going to Linfood and nine going to Oriel.
Downsway Supermarkets		Bought by Fine Fare	1976	East Anglian based supermarket group with 80 stores owned by Vestey Group. Group had purchased grocery stores Platt Stores and C.H.Kaye, and had £10.9 million in sales during 1974. 47 stores were sold in 1976 and converted to Fine Fare stores. The remaining stores were converted to Freezer Fare.
Elmo Stores		Bought by Fine Fare	1967	Started as grocery store chain by Mossy Vanger, a cousin of Jack Cohen. The business grew into a small chain of 28 stores based in East Anglia and the South of England. The business was purchased by South African retailer O.K Bazaars in 1962, the same year it opened its first supermarket in Norwich. It was later purchased for £1m by Fine Fare and run as Elmo Discount Centres before being re-branded under either Fine Fare or Shoppers Paradise.
extra				Supermarket brand used by Leicestershire Co-operative Society.
Fairway	1960s	Bought by Frank Dee	1980s	Doncaster based chain of supermarkets started by Mr. Harry Round, bought by Frank Dee in 1980s and merged into that chain.
Fine Fare	1951	Bought by Gateway	1988	Britain's third supermarket until the 1980s behind Tesco and Sainsburys; bought by Gateway Corp. in 1986 and shops re-branded as Gateway by 1988.
Frozen Pantry				Frozen food chain with stores located in Mansfield, Doncaster, Sheffield and Worksop.
Fulham Frozen Foods		Purchased by Iceland		Doncaster based frozen food retailer
Fulton's Foods	1974	Bought by Poundland	2022	Primarily frozen foods supermarket chain based in South Yorkshire with branches across the Midlands and North of England; acquired by Poundland in October 2020. In February 2022, Poundland announced the closure of all remaining Fulton's Foods stores.
Food Giant	1970s	Re-branded as Kwik Save	1990s	Originally part of Somerfield group, all stores converted to Kwik Save following the Somerfield takeover of Kwik Save
Ford & Lock	1960	Sold to Gateway	1974	36 shops across south-west England; owner Brian Ford went on to open a new store in his own name.
Freezer Fare		Bought by Argyll Group	1980	66 freezer store chain formed by Vestey from the remainder of Downsway, bought by Argyll Group and added to Cordon Bleu chain.
Freezeway		Bought by Farmfoods		Small chain of frozen food stores bought by Farmfoods
FreshXpress	2007	Administration in 2008, liquidated in 2009	2009	Smaller stores of former Kwik Save chain; bought out by management team led by Brendan Murtagh.
Frank Dee Supermarkets		Re-branded as Gateway, later Somerfield, later taken over by Co-op		Chain of supermarkets based in North East of England; parent company Linfood Holdings purchased the smaller Gateway chain and re-branded stores as Gateway and the parent company as Dee Corporation.
Galbraith supermarkets	1894	Bought by Allied Suppliers, then Argyll Group		Scottish chain
Gateway Foodmarkets	1950	Re-branded as Somerfield		During restructuring of the parent company in the 1990s, starting in 1994, all Gateway Foodmarkets stores were either retained and re-branded as Somerfield, closed or sold off to competitors and converted.
GEM	1965	Purchased by Asda	1966	Opened Britain's first out of town supermarket in West Bridgford, Nottinghamshire, during 1964, GEM was an American department store retailer who ran the store under a concessions basis. A further store in Leeds was added in 1965, but the UK business was sold to Asda in 1966.
Goodfellows				Hull and East Yorkshire based chain
Grandways		Some stores sold to Argyll Group for its Presto chain and Kwik Save; remainder renamed Jacksons	1992–1993	Regional in Yorkshire
Granville Supermarkets				31 stores purchased by International Stores.
GT Smith		Bought by Co-operative Group	2002	Regional in West Yorkshire
J. Gunn & Co		Voluntary Liquidation	1970	Started life as corn merchant stores, but moved into the self service grocery and supermarket business during the 1950s and 60s, operating under the names Gunn Self-Service Stores, Selina Supermarkets and Selina Superettes. Company went into voluntary liquidation.
Haldanes	2009	(including UGO stores)	2011	Fell into Administration
Hanburys	1889	Bought by Co-Op	1997	Started in 1889 when Jeremiah Hanbury opened a small store in Market Street, Farnworth, selling butter and bacon. In 1929, the business was bought by Bolton wholesale grocers E.H. Steele Ltd. In 1997 the 31 Hanburys stores, which cover the north-west, including 8 in Bolton, were acquired by United Norwest Co-op and subsequently re-branded.
Heagneys Supermarkets			1999	North East chain, who purchased fellow local business Star Discount and operated from 12 stores.
Hodgson & Hepworth				South Yorkshire grocery chain based in Doncaster. Supermarket at St Sepulchre Gate. Purchased by Fine Fare, closed in 1979 and became a Primark.
Hillards	1880	Bought by Tesco	1988	Several locations throughout Midlands, North East
Hintons		Bought by Argyll Foods to become part of Presto		Mainly in North East England and Yorkshire
Homefare Supermarket				Based in former Wickhams Department Store building on Mile End Road.
Home and Colonial Stores	1883	Bought by Cavenham Foods	1972	Acquired Lipton's (1931), Galbraith's (1954), Andrew Cochrane, A. Massey and Sons, R. and J. Templeton and Vye and Son. Converted to Presto or Lo-Cost stores
Hollis Supermarkets				Former Grocery business based in Norfolk and Suffolk, which opened several supermarkets, including a store in the former Boundary Garage on Hellesdon and the current site of Wilkinson in Gorleston.
Igloo		Purchased by Iceland		North East based freezer food chain.
Imperial Stores		Bought by International	1977	Grocery store group in South Buckinghamshire. Purchased by International Stores in 1949. High Wycombe branch converted to a supermarket in 1963. Closed when International Stores bought Price-rite chain, which had a store opposite.
Irwin's Stores		Bought by Tesco		
International	1874	Bought by Dee Corporation	1996	Stores were re-branded Gateway or sold off to competitors
Anthony Jackson Foodfare		Bought by Victor Value		
Jacksons		Bought by J Sainsbury	2008	See also Grandways, above, which was originally part of the same group. Stores originally traded under the Jacksons name, and were slowly converted to the Grandways brand. After the sale of a number of larger stores in 1992, all smaller store reverted to the Jacksons facia until the company was sold to Sainsbury in 2004. The Jackson name was then retained under the "Sainsbury's @ Jackson" fascia until it was re-branded Sainsbury's Local in 2007–2008.
James Duckworth		Wright's Biscuits was purchased by Cavenham Foods in 1971, and was merged with Moores Stores into holding company Cavenham-Southland. Stores were re-branded under Moores Stores.		Founded by James Duckworth, and known as Jimmy Ducks, the grocery chain grew to 180 stores across Lancashire, Yorkshire and Cheshire. The business was bought by Wright's Biscuits in 1958, and during the 1960s started opening supermarkets under the James Duckworth brand.
John Gardner		Bought by Safeway	1963	Small chain of supermarkets based in London. Purchased along with sister brand Prideaux for £1.2 million.
Kenton Supermarkets				Small chain based in North West of England
Key Markets Supermarkets		Bought by Dee Corporation		Created by food giant Fitch Lovell in 1963. Purchased by Dee Corporation in 1983. Re-branded as Gateway.
Kibby's Supermarkets				Chain of supermarkets owned by Unigate. The business was sold off to Laws Stores in the early 70s.
Kingsway Supermarkets				Small chain based in the South West. Became part of Gateways.
Kwik Save	1959	Administration		Company purchased by Somerfield in 1998. Name and 177 stores sold by Somerfield in 2006 but went into administration in 2007. The name was later purchased by Costcutter who began opening convenience stores under the name in 2012.
Laws Stores	c.1890s	Bought by Wm Low for £7.1 million in 1985	1985	Chain of supermarkets focused on North East England
Lennons Supermarkets	1958	Bought by Dee Corporation		Chain of Supermarkets and off-licences based in North East. Started out as a wholesaler in 1900, before opening a chain of grocers in between the wars. Opened its first supermarket in 1956 in Widnes and by 1974 operated 34 supermarkets and 49 off licences. The company had 41 supermarkets and 96 off-licences when it was bought by the Dee Corporation in 1984 for £23 million. The stores were re-branded as Gateway.
Leos		Re-branded Co-operative Pioneer		Name given to larger co-operative stores during the 1980s
Liptons	1871	Bought by Allied Suppliers		Converted to Presto or Lo-Cost stores
Lo-Cost		Converted to Safeway. Some stores sold to other chains e.g. Kwik Save.		
Lodges	1921	Bought by Co-operative Retail Services	1995	Trading name of F and A E Lodge. Founded in Huddersfield by Albert and Frank Lodge growing to more than 30 shops, mainly in West Yorkshire and Lancashire market halls by the early 1960s. Opening first supermarket in a converted cinema in Marsh, followed by another converted cinema at Waterloo. Market hall shops were closed with other supermarket branches opening in Meltham, Huddersfield Town Centre, Crossland Moor, Lepton, Darwen, and finally Honley and Holmfirth in 1975. In the late 1960s, Clough Mill in Birkby was bought with plans for 90,000 sq ft hypermarket, objections delayed opening until 1978 and it was sold to Asda in 1980. Remaining stores were bought in 1991 for more than £5 million. The brand was sold to Co-operative Retail Services in March 1995.
Lowfreeze		Bought by Bejam		Small chain of freezer shops started by W M Low as part of expansion plans. The business was bought by Bejam.
Mac Food Centre		Bought by International Stores	1978	Supermarket chain created by Unilever by expanding its Wet fish stores, Mac Fisheries. Was further expanded by the purchase of Premier from Express Dairy's
Madora Supermarkets				Chain of supermarkets owned by Fitch Lovell's subsidiary Key Markets.
Mainstop		Acquired by Gateway	1981	
Markdown Supermarkets				Stores nationwide including Nantwich Road, Crewe, Prescot, Denton, Disbury and Tottenham
A. Massey & Sons		Bought by Home & Colonial		Chain of Scottish grocery stores purchased by Home & Colonial. The chain opened a few supermarkets.
Memory Brothers		Bought by Wallis Supermarkets	1974	Grocers that were owned by the Matthews Butchery chain and operated 6 supermarkets, including opening in Woolwich in the former Century cinema. The business was sold to F J Wallis in 1974.
Mercury Market		Bought by Fine Fare		Chain of supermarkets based in the North West opened by the De Rooy family who had previously run grocers.
Merlin Supermarkets		Bought by Associated British Foods	1967	Chain of supermarkets formed by Melias. The original business was set up as a separate company, but in 1961 Melias closed the company and transferred management internally. A majority shareholding in Melias was purchased by Associated British Foods (ABF) in 1967, with many of the management structure shared with ABF's Fine Fare business and Merlin's stores re-branded under the Fine Fare name. ABF purchased the remaining shares in Melias in 1972 and was merged into Fine Fare holding company.
Midland Supermarket				Had a branch in Earle Street, Crewe.
Moores Stores		Bought by Cavenham Foods in 1971; Merged with Sister group owned by Wright's Biscuits; added to Cavenham's Allied Suppliers group in 1976/77.	1977	Chain of small supermarkets based in the North East of England, which had a turnover of £53m in 1969–1970 The store was bought by Cavenham Foods in 1971 after purchasing the shareholdings of Wright's Biscuits owner Willie Webster. The stores of Wright's and Moores were merged into a new group, Cavenham-Southland, part owned by 7-eleven owner Southland Corporation. The stores were later transferred to Cavenham's Allied Suppliers division after it purchase in 1976, and were either re-branded under the Liptons or Presto nameplates.
Netto	1990	Bought by Asda	2011	Was a no frills supermarket. In 2010, Asda acquired Netto UK for £778M from Dansk Supermarked Group. In 2011, 147 of the stores were re-branded under the Asda Supermarket name, with the remaining 47 stores being sold off to other companies such as Morrisons and new convenience store UGO and other retailers owing to competition laws.
Netto	2014		2016	Joint-venture with Sainsbury's. In July 2016, Sainsbury's ended the joint venture, scrapping the Netto name in the UK once again.
Normans supermarkets		Bought by Plymco		Chain of cash and carry stores in the South West. Founded by Ken Norman in Budleigh Salterton in 1957, becoming first cash and carry in the South West. 7 Stores across Somerset, Devon and Cornwall by 1979. Sold to Singlo Holdings who opened further stores before selling to Plymco.
Normid		Re-branded Co-op		Was owned by United Co-operatives
Norco		Re-branded Co-op		Aberdeen based co-operative society
Oakeshotts		Purchased by Fine Fare		Grocery and supermarket chain run by Barker & Dobson (originally called Scribbans-Kemp), which brought together 180 shops trading under 31 different names including United Counties, Baylis and Stevenson & Rush. The business had sales of £14.2 million in 1974. Purchased by Fine Fare.
Orchard Frozen Foods		Went into receivership and 12 stores were bought by Iceland	1986	Chain of freezer centres based in the South East of England and owned by the Carr family. The business went into receivership in 1985 and 12 of the 37 stores were purchased by Iceland, after a bidding war with rival Bejam, for £910,000.
Paddy's Superstore				Chain of 33 no frills grocery superstores. Purchased by Morgan Edwards, a wholesaling business that also owned Supavalu, which became part of Argyll Foods. The stores were either closed or moved to the Lo-Cost brand.
Peglers Stores		Wright's Biscuits was purchased by Cavenham Foods in 1971, and merged with Moores Stores into holding company Cavenham-Southland. Stores were re-branded under Moores Stores.		A grocery chain purchased by Wright's Biscuits that moved into the supermarket trade during the late 1960s.
Premier Supermarkets		Bought by Mac Fisheries	1965	Subsidiary of Express Dairies, opened UK's first supermarket in Streatham, South London in 1951. Sold after losing out on purchase of Irwin's stores to Tesco
Presto	1977	Re-branded as Safeway after purchasing the chain	1998	
Price Rite				Chain of stores purchased by British American Tobacco and incorporated into International Stores; some stores were re-branded as International Stores while 67 were sold to Argyll Foods.
Prideaux		Bought by Safeway	1963	Small chain of supermarkets based in London. Purchased along with sister brand John Gardiner for £1.2 million.
Proudfoot	1948	Became a single-outlet business when all-but-one store sold to Tesco in 2026.	2026 (as a chain)	Small independent chain with shops around Scarborough.
Quality Fare		Bought by the Co-operative Group in 2004.		19 store chain started by the Leathley family in 1969 and based in the North East.
Queens Supermarkets	1958	Merged with Associated Dairies and GEN to form ASDA	1965	Small chain of supermarkets started by Asquith family in Pontefract. In 1965 merged with Associated Dairies and purchased the GEN brand, relaunching as ASDA Queens, before becoming ASDA. ASDA is an abbreviation of ASquith and DAiries.
Rainbow		Discontinued, re-branded as parent Co-op		
Richway Supermarkets				Retail chain operating in South of England and the Isle of Wight.
Robsons Eucomarket				Based in Haxby Yorkshire.
Safeway	1962	Bought by Morrisons	2005	Safeway Compact stores sold to Somerfield. Was still trading under Safeway in Channel Islands until becoming Waitrose in 2010.
Sainsbury's Freezer Centres	1974	Bought by Bejam	1986	Sainsburys opened the chain of freezer shops to try and compete with the new style of food store, with the first store opening in Southbourne near Bournemouth. By 1980 there was 21 freezer centres, but these were sold off in 1986 to Bejam.
Sainsbury's Savacentre	1977	Discontinued, Re-branded Sainsbury's	2005	Savacentre was a joint project started by Sainsburys and BHS to compete in Hypermarket scene. Sainsburys added when BHS pulled out of the company.
Sanders Brothers	1877	Bankruptcy	1950s	One of Britain's biggest grocers and food producers, with more than 263 stores in 1937 within London and the South East. The business collapsed in the 1950s.
Savemore Stores				Hull based supermarket created by Clifford Dunn and spread across the North. Later went on to become Clifford Dunn Supermarkets.
Saverite	1968	Bought by West Midlands Co-operative Society, which later became Mid-counties Co-operative after a merger with Oxford, Swindon and Gloucester Co-operative	2000	Shropshire based grocery business started in 1869. Renamed Saverite in 1968 (from Morris & Co) and expanded into supermarkets. Sold to Mid-Counties Co-operative in 2000.
Savon Foods		Converted to Key Markets	1970s	A supermarket subsidiary set up by grocers, Green's Stores of Ilford, who were in turn owned by Fitch Lovell. Would eventually become part of its Key Markets chain.
Scan Superstores	1974	Sold to Tesco	1978	Two superstores setup by Debenhams to sell a mixture of food and non food products.
Schofield & Martin		Re-branded Waitrose	c.1965	Small chain of grocers based in South Essex purchased by Waitrose in 1944. Had the first self-service supermarket store within the Waitrose group in 1951.
SIMCO Supermarkets		Taken over by Dunnes Stores		Supermarket chain based in North of England.
Shoppers Paradise		Taken over by Gateway Foodmarkets		Discount food store chain created by Associated British Foods from unprofitable Fine Fare stores. Became part of Gateway Foodmarkets as part of Fine Fare purchase.
Shopping Giant		Brand name for Co-op stores in the Greater Manchester area		Brand name for CO-OP
Shop Rite	1972	Bought by Kwik Save, the business continued to trade as ShopRite in the Isle of Man stocking a range of Waitrose & Iceland products as well as locally produced goods until being purchased by Tesco.	1994	Discount supermarket chain started by Isle of Man business in Scotland, and expanded to the North of England between 1990 and 1994. The company's finances collapsed.
Smiths Freezer Centres			c.1990s	Small chain of freezer stores located in Essex; went into liquidation during the 1990s
Somerfield	1875	Purchase agreed by the Co-operative Group on 16 July 2008 for £1.56bn; from 2009 many larger stores were sold off and smaller stores re-branded to The Co-operative Food	2011	
Solo		Trading name of Gateway – re-branded Somerfield		Trading name created by Gateway
St Catherine's Freezer Centres		Bought by Iceland	1983	Chain of 18 freezer centres located in Bristol and South West area
Star Discounts		Bought by Heagneys Supermarkets in 1990s	1990s	Goole based chain, with stores located across Teesside.
Stewarts Supermarket Limited		Bought by Tesco		Associated British Foods owned Northern Ireland group
Stitchers Supermarkets		Bought by Downsway		Small chain of supermarkets purchased by Downsway and re-branded
Supa Centa				Supermarket brand owned 50% by Fitch Lovell.
Supa-Save	1960	Closed by owners Keddies	1970s	Independent American style superstore opened by Southend's largest department store chain, Keddies, in the former Essoldo cinema. Store was closed in the 70s owing to competition from national competitors, and the building demolished and the site used to extend the department store.
Supavalu				Chain setup by Morgan Edwards Ltd, a Shrewsbury-based wholesaler. Morgan Edwards had 30% purchased by James Gulliver Associates subsidiary Avonmiles. In 1980, Morgan Edwards was purchased by Gulliver's other company, butchers Louis G Edwards for £4.3 million and became part of the newly formed Argyll Food in May 1980. The Supavalu brand was merged into the Lo-Cost brand.
Super Key		Parent Key Markets was bought by Linwood Corporation, owners of Gateway. Stores were re-branded.		Alternative brand name for certain larger Keymarket Stores. Largest store was in Wisbech.
Supermac	1964	Demolished to make way for Forrestside Shopping Centre		Northern Ireland's first out of town supermarket opened by Anderson & Macauley.
Supernational Stores	1935	Bought by Gateway		
Taskers	1961			Local supermarket based in Burnley and Blackpool, started by Eddie Skinner.
Templeton supermarkets	1880	Bought by Allied Suppliers then Argyll Group		Scottish chain, re-branded as Presto
Tower Discount		Were re-branded under Allied Suppliers brands	1977	Trading name given to the larger supermarkets owned by Cavenham-Southland.
Value Foods	1959	Re-branded as Kwik Save	1965	Opened as a grocery store in Rhyl in 1959, grew into a small supermarket chain operating in North Wales. In 1965 the brand name was changed to Kwik Save.
Victor Value		Bought by Tesco	1968/1986	Chain created by the combine, London Grocers; larger stores were re-branded as Tesco after takeover; remaining stores were sold to Bejam in 1986, before being sold to Kwiksave in 1989 by Iceland after its purchase of Bejam.
Vye & Son: The Kentish Grocer	1817	Bought by Home & Colonial	1960s	Independent chain of about 40 stores. Originally tea and coffee importers.
Wallis	1955	Bought by International Stores	1977	Founded by Francis J Wallis with a single store in Ilford just before World War II. By 1968, there were 38 stores, but in 1972 the plane that Francis was piloting crashed, killing not only Wallis but also Lesley Cater of rival chain Cater Supermarkets. In 1977, the chain's 100 stores were sold to British American Tobacco for £21 million and merged with its already owned chain International Stores. The stores were re-branded International.
Wallis Frozen Foods		Purchased by Farmfoods	1990	A chain of 18 stores, Purchased by Farmfoods in the 1990, which was there foray into England.
Wavy Line				Small chain of small supermarkets and convenience stores located in the South and South East of England
Walter Willson		Bought by Alldays		Chain of small supermarkets and convenience stores in the north east of England and Cumbria
Wellworths		Bought by Musgrave Group & Safeway	1997	Northern Ireland supermarket chain split into Supervalu and Safeway
Whelan Discount Stores		Bought by Morrisons for £1.5 million	1978	Chain of supermarkets based in Lancashire started by JJB Sports owner Dave Whelan
Wm Low		Bought by Tesco		Presence in Scotland and northern England
Williamson & Treadgold				Bournemouth based grocers that opened a supermarket at The Hampshire Centre. The store was eventually purchased by Sainsburys.
Woolco	1966	Discontinued, re-branded as Woolworth and later bought by Gateway in 1986	1982	Hypermarket chain started by Woolworth
Wrensons	1909	Renamed David Greig	1973	Grocery store chain based in Birmingham, who were purchased by Martin & Peter Green, formerly of Adsega in 1972. It purchased fellow grocery store chain Redmans and David Greig, moving into the supermarket trade, before re-branding the business under the David Greig name.

== Waitrose effect ==
Proximity to a supermarket has been widely reported to be an amenity that can have a significant effect on residential property prices in Britain. Beginning under Andy Hulme and continuing under Mike Songer, the home mortgage unit of Lloyds Bank has published pricing research that examines the premiums commanded by homes in a given neighbourhood against comparables in the same post-code and correlates the difference in price with convenience of access to the various supermarkets. The following table averages information from neighbourhoods across England and Wales, compiled by Lloyds Bank for its 2016 report using supermarket location information from CACI Datalab and house price information from HM Land Registry.

Supermarket	Nearby property premium	
Supermarket	(%)	(£)
Waitrose	10%	£38,666
Sainsbury's	10%	£27,939
Marks & Spencer	9%	£27,182
Tesco	9%	£22,072
Iceland	8%	£20,034
Co-op	8%	£17,904
Morrisons	5%	£10,558
Asda	2%	£5,026
Lidl	2%	£3,926
Aldi	1%	£1,333

== See also ==
- List of supermarket chains, for supermarkets worldwide
- List of convenience shops in the United Kingdom
- List of discount shops in the United Kingdom
- List of clothing and footwear shops in the United Kingdom
