= Frank Dee Supermarkets =

British supermarket chain

Frank Dee Supermarkets was a British supermarket chain formed in the 1950s, based in Kingston upon Hull, East Yorkshire. An early adopter of the new style of self-service grocery store, the chain grew to over 100 stores through mergers and acquisitions before adopting the Gateway fascia in 1983.

== Trading names ==
Stores traded initially under the name of Frank Dee, then Frank Dee Foodmarkets and from 1980, Frank Dee Supermarkets, along with a number of stores operating a lower price, no frills, limited range concept from the late 1970s which traded as Dee Discount. Often referred to by customers in the Tyne-Tees area as 'Frankie Dee's'.

== Style ==
Stores were brightly lit with bulk displays, low price was emphasised with extensive use of 'Day-Glo' posters. Shop front fascia varied over the years, with Frank Dee's name continuing to feature until the change to Gateway in 1983.

== History ==
=== Early years ===
The business was founded in 1933 when the founder Frank Dee opened a grocers shop at 773, Hessle Road in the area of West Hull known as Gipsyville. Shortly after the Second World War, shops were opened in Beverley and elsewhere in Hull.

=== 1950s ===
Frank Dee was an early proponent of self-service and in the 1950s converted Hessle Road to self-service and opened 6 more small supermarkets in Hull whilst retaining a counter service shop in Beverley. Frank Dee Ltd was incorporated in 1959.

=== 1960s ===
During the early 1960s, more shops were opened in Hull and in 1965 a large ‘superstore’ was opened in Middlesbrough. In 1967, a new supermarket replaced the counter service shop in Beverley. In the mid 1960s, Frank Dee Ltd merged with local wholesaler Jarman & Flint Ltd (Jarmans). Frank Dee Ltd became a subsidiary, and the retailing arm, of Jarmans. Stores in Hull, Brough, Bridlington, York and Thorne previously run by Jarmans were converted to the Frank Dee format.

In 1969, Jarman & Flint Ltd merged with Associated Food Holdings plc.

=== 1970s ===
In the 1970s, Frank Dee stores were opened across the North East of England including in Durham, Hessle, Redcar, South Shields, Leeds, Scarborough, Saltburn, Berwick Hills, Northallerton, Eaglescliffe and Filey. In the mid 1970s, Associated Food Holdings became part of Linfoods plc, and Jarman's took over the retail arm of the Manchester-based wholesaler Wright & Green Ltd. This prompted expansion into the North West of England, and Frank Dee stores now began trading in Sale, Stockport, Liverpool, Farnworth, Marple and on the Wirral Peninsula.

=== 1980s ===
During the early 1980s, Linfood plc disposed of its wholesale businesses, and rapidly expanded its retail operation mainly by acquisition of other businesses. In 1982, the Jarman & Flint Ltd name was changed to Frank Dee Supermarkets Ltd. Sheffield based Challenge Supermarkets and Doncaster based Fairways Supermarkets chains were acquired by Linfood extending the Frank Dee name further into South Yorkshire. More Frank Dee stores opened in Tyne-Tees including in Consett and Houghton-le-Spring. Yorkshire openings included Mexborough, Driffield and Maltby. Lancashire based Lennons was acquired by Linfoods and stores converted to Frank Dee format. At the end of 1982 Frank Dee Supermarkets operated from over 75 locations across the North of England.

In early 1983, Linfood plc announced Frank Dee Supermarkets and all of its other recent acquisitions (including Big Dee, Fine Fare, KeyMarkets and International) would change name and trade under the Gateway marque, whilst Linfood itself changed its name to Dee Corporation plc. Frank Dee took on a non-executive Director role at Gateway Supermarkets Ltd, and by 1984, Dee Corporation was ranked third in size by revenue in the UK grocery market, behind Tesco and Sainsbury's.

Frank Dee retired in 1987, and The Dee Corporation changed name to The Gateway Corporation in 1988

== See also ==
- List of supermarket chains in the United Kingdom
