= Supermarket Direct =

British online grocer

- Industry: Internet retail
- Founded: October 1995; 30 years ago
- Founder: Adrian Flanagan, Dominick Scott-Flanagan
- Fate: Bought by Somerfield
- Headquarters: London, U.K.
- Area served: South East England
- Key people: David Noble
- Services: Groceries

Supermarket Direct was a pioneering online grocer, providing a home grocery shopping and delivery service in London from October 1995. The company sold Sainsbury's-provided groceries until it was bought by Somerfield and integrated into the Somerfield Direct home shopping service.

== History ==
Supermarket Direct was founded by Adrian Flanagan and Dominick Scott-Flanagan, and launched in October 1995. The deal with Sainsbury's made Sainsbury's the first major grocery store in the UK to provide home shopping.

At the launch, customers could select from a catalogue of 1,700 proprietary branded groceries, and telephone or fax their order to a call centre. Orders received before 6pm could be delivered within a two-hour period the following day. Following a relaunch in 1996 a further 800 Sainsbury's-branded groceries were added to the catalogue, and by November 1998 over 4,000 products were available including Flanagan's own label products. Delivery was charged for, initially at £4, later at £5.

Running a small fleet of 12 vans, by the start of 1997 the company had 5,000 regular customers and was taking 170 orders per day.

Somerfield bought Supermarket Direct in April 1999 for £3.25 million, and Supermarket Direct partners Dominick Scott-Flanagan and David Noble joined the Somerfield Direct board. At the time Somerfield Direct only covered the South West of England from its base in Bristol. With the incorporation of Supermarket Direct, Somerfield Direct extended its range to the London area.
