= Shoprite =

Shoprite, ShopRite, Shop Rite or Shop-Rite may refer to:

- ShopRite, the retailers' cooperative (co-op) chain of supermarkets in the northeastern United States
- Shop-Rite (Canada), a Canadian catalogue store that operated from the 1970s to 1982
- Shoprite (Isle of Man), former Manx food retailer that once traded in the United Kingdom
- Shoprite (South Africa), the South African food distributor
