= List of honorary fellows of St Hugh's College, Oxford =

This is a list of Honorary Fellows of St Hugh's College, Oxford.

- Julia Annas
- Dame Eileen Atkins
- Betty Boothroyd, Baroness Boothroyd
- Andrew Burrows
- Nicolas Browne-Wilkinson, Baron Browne-Wilkinson
- Kay Carberry
- Sir Andrew Dilnot
- Dame Elizabeth Forgan
- Rebecca Front
- Gillian Gehring
- Dame Helen Ghosh
- Jane Glover
- Heather Hallett, Baroness Hallett
- Anne Hudson
- Dame Leonie Kramer
- Aung San Suu Kyi
- Sir Quo-Wei Lee
- Andrew Li
- Doreen Massey
- Alec Monk
- Alison Noble
- Sir Keith O'Nions
- Margie Orford
- Sarah Outen
- Richard Ovenden
- Ursula Owen
- Roger Parker
- Rebecca Posner
- Robert Ribeiro
- Bridget Riley
- Jane Roberts
- Janet Rossant
- Subra Suresh
- June Tabor
- Robert Tang
- Lionel Tarassenko
- Jo Valentine, Baroness Valentine
- Sir David Verey
- Ian Walmsley
- Mary-Kay Wilmers
