= Star Supply Stores =

- Company type: Private
- Industry: Retail
- Founded: 1873
- Defunct: 1929
- Fate: Acquired
- Successor: International Tea Co. Stores
- Headquarters: Manchester, England
- Products: Groceries

Star Supply Stores was a leading chain of British grocers.

== History ==
The business was founded in Manchester in 1873 by Joseph Cadman and James Fish as the Star Tea Company. Soon, many towns in England had their own Star Supply Store, as immortalised in a verse from John Betjeman's poem Myfanwy:

Smooth down the Avenue glitters the bicycle,
Black-stockinged legs under navy blue serge,
Home and Colonial, Star, International,
Balancing bicycle leant on the verge.

In 1922 the company, which by then had built up a chain of over 300 shops, bought Ridgways, a leading blender. In 1929 Star Supply Stores was acquired by International Tea Co. Stores.
