= Mattessons =

Processed meat business in the UK

Mattessons is a United Kingdom-based manufacturer of processed-meat products, particularly sausages and pâté. The company became famous in the 1970s for its "Mmmm" television adverts, with the strap line "Just try saying Mattessons without saying Mmm."

Mattessons was founded in 1947 by German Rhineland-born, Richard Mattes, a butcher who arrived in England in the 1930s, and his son Werner Mattes. Richard wished to produce an Anglo-version of his homeland's cuisine, although it was only with the end of rationing that he could amend the ingredients to nearer to the Continent's 100% meat. The company developed rapidly, introducing new lines and brands, including Chubs spread in 1966, the first UK pre-packed sliced meat in 1970, and the UK's first pâté in 1971.

Taken over by Unilever in 1965, it became part of Unilever Meat Group UK (UMGUK), along with Wall's, Lawsons, and Drings. UMGUK was chaired by Werner Mattes until his retirement in 1986. At that point, Mattessons was merged with the meat side of Wall's to form Mattessons Wall's. In this form it was sold to Kerry Group in 1994.

The brand is still made and distributed throughout the UK and in 2012 advertised its Fridge Raiders product with an advert centred around the Cockney rhyming slang phrase "Hank Marvin" (meaning "starving"). It shows a group of secondary school students making their way home dressed up as said guitarist, playing Fender Stratocaster guitars.
