= Budgens =

Chain of grocery stores in the United Kingdom

Budgens Stores Limited
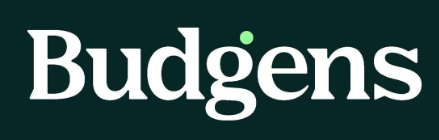
- Logo used since 2026
- Formerly: Bishop's Food Stores Limited (1962–1986); Budgen Limited (1986–1987); Budgens Limited (1987–1988)
- Type: Subsidiary
- Industry: Retail
- Founded: 1872; 154 years ago Maidenhead, Berkshire, England
- Founder: John Budgen
- Headquarters: Harefield, Greater London, England
- Area served: England and Wales
- Parent: Booker Retail Partners, owned by Tesco plc
- Website: budgens.co.uk

Budgens Stores Limited, trading as Budgens, is a chain of grocery stores in the United Kingdom. The business was founded in 1872 by John Budgen, who opened the first shop in Maidenhead, Berkshire, England, and was incorporated as a private limited company on 28 May 1962. The company is a subsidiary and retail of Booker Group, part of Tesco plc. The shops are privately owned but operate under the Budgens name on condition they buy exclusively from Booker.

== History ==
The first Budgens shop was opened in 1872, by John Budgen. The first few shops were small local grocery stores, which expanded across the south of England.

In October 1997, Budgens acquired the 57-shop network of the American 7-Eleven chain in the United Kingdom, re-branding them with the concept name 'B2'. By June 1998, it was clear that the name was not popular with customers and the 30 shops that were outside London began trading under the 'Budgens' fascia. The 'B2' branded shops in London were then changed to 'Budgens Express' before finally reverting to the 'Budgens' brand.

In June 2002, the company was purchased by the Irish Musgrave Group. Two years later, they started selling off Budgens shops; the largest shops were disposed of on the open market, with shops in places including Tadley and Mildenhall going to larger shop chains. Other shops were divested to independent retailers, including Jempsons & Tout and CT Baker, which continued as franchises under the 'Budgens' name. Musgrave Group also franchised the Budgens brand to new retailers, leading to more shop openings in the independent sector and expanding the brand to many petrol station forecourts.

In 2007, the divestment of the original Budgens shops to independent retailers was complete, although by March 2009, a few underperforming Budgens stores had been returned to Musgrave. A further eight stores were acquired in 2009 by a Budgens franchise partner from the Co-op, which had acquired them on taking over the Somerfield group, but was instructed to dispose of them by the Office of Fair Trading. These stores closed just eight months later. The former Co-op branch in New Invention near Willenhall, which was one of the stores acquired, has since reopened as an Aldi.

In May 2015, Musgrave Group confirmed that it had reached an agreement to sell Budgens and Londis for £40 million to the wholesaler Booker Group, subject to regulatory approval.

In January 2017 Tesco launched a takeover bid for Booker, including the Budgens fascia. This acquisition was completed in March 2018.

== Shops ==
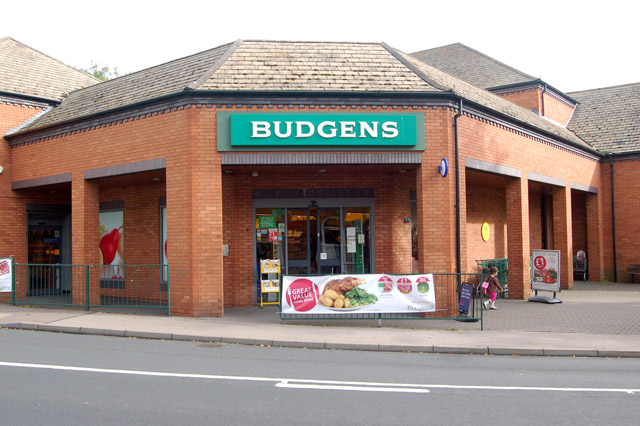
Budgens in Southam, Warwickshire, 2009

Budgens stores range in size from around 140 m^{2} to around 1,200 m^{2}, and therefore fall into the convenience store size range or the bottom end of the supermarket size range. According to retail analysts TNS Worldpanel, Budgens ranked 13th in the grocery sector in the United Kingdom in December 2004, with a market share of 0.4%.

The first two Scottish shops opened in July 2016. These were bought from the Co-operative Group, and had previously been branded as Somerfield and Safeway. They are located in Paisley and Prestwick. The Paisley shop closed later that year. In 2006, 2007, 2008 and 2012, Budgens was voted Fresh Foods Convenience Retailer of the Year in the company owned sector at the Retail Industry Awards.

The largest Budgens shop is in the town of Holt, Norfolk, with just over 13,000 square feet (1,200 m^{2}). The original shop was destroyed by fire on 20 June 2020. The current shop was opened on 30 March 2023, and is a completely new building. The approved rebuilding plans required the shop to be of a size and design to match the destroyed building; the internal layout has been significantly altered with a change in services offered, but still includes a sub-post office counter.

== Corporate identity ==
Budgen corporate identity (1969–1989)

As the supermarket concept developed in the United Kingdom in the 1950s, the appearance of the brand names developed as well and were designed to be colourful, eye catching and distinctive. Budgens adopted a colour scheme during the end of the 1960s, which incorporated orange as the base colour, very popular at the time. The shops were branded simply as 'Budgen', a progression from 'Budgen & Co. Ltd.', in a unique white font on the orange background.

A distinctive logo was also used for the 'Budgen' branding, which incorporated a tulip (symbolising freshness) depicted in orange and white on a brown rounded square background. The orange 'Budgen' corporate identity was used from 1969–1989.

Budgens logo used from 2008–2026

Budgen was subsequently rebranded 'Budgens' around 1990. The orange gave way to a white background, the tulip logo disappeared and the font was changed to a handwriting style scribble, in orange, underlined in green. This was used until around 1997, when the identity was replaced with a dark green colour scheme with 'Budgens' in white capital letters. This identity was later replaced with a lighter two-tone green background, with the 'Budgens' device now depicted in a lower case font.

In 2026, Booker Retail Partners announced that the brand would undergo a complete brand refresh; this included a new logo, new colour scheme and new store format. As part of this rebrand, the store in Ascot was rebranded from Londis and was the first store to feature the new branding.
