= John Apthorp =

British businessman (1935–2024)

John Apthorp OBE, CBE
- Born: John Dorrington Apthorp; 25 April 1935; London, United Kingdom
- Died: 9 July 2024 (aged 89); Radlett, Hertfordshire, United Kingdom
- Education: Aldenham School
- Occupation: Businessman
- Known for: Founder of Bejam
- Spouse: Jane Arnold (m.1959)
- Children: 4

John Dorrington Apthorp CBE (25 April 1935 – 9 July 2024) was a British businessman specialising in frozen food and alcoholic beverages, as well as a philanthropist.

== Early life ==
Apthorp was educated at Aldenham School, before working for his father's potato business. In 1968 it was bought by Ross Group of Grimsby, and Apthorp departed the larger business.

== Career ==
=== Bejam ===
The Bejam frozen food retail chain was founded by John Apthorp after he left the Ross Group. The first store was established in Edgware, with the company's name, Bejam, being an acronym derived from the initials of Apthorp's family members. At the time of Bejam's founding, domestic freezers were not yet common in British homes. However, the business grew rapidly as freezer ownership increased, surpassing two million appliances in the UK by 1973. Apthorp oversaw the company's successful listing on the London Stock Exchange. By the 1980s, Bejam had expanded significantly, operating over 400 stores and employing approximately 10,000 staff. The company had secured a leading market position, with Apthorp holding 30% of the company shares.

In 1988, Bejam was the subject of a hostile takeover bid by rival frozen food retailer Iceland. The acquisition was ultimately successful, valued at £238 million, and resulted in Apthorp being bought out of the company he founded. The Bejam brand was subsequently retired as the stores were converted to Iceland outlets.

=== Majestic Wines ===
Following the takeover of Bejam by Iceland in 1988, John Apthorp retained ownership of Wizard Wines, a brand that Bejam had acquired in 1987. In 1991, Apthorp's company acquired the competing retailer Majestic Wine. He subsequently focused on growing this business, transitioning it from a competitor to a leading specialist wine retailer. Apthorp oversaw Majestic Wine's successful listing on the Alternative Investment Market (AIM) of the London Stock Exchange in 1996. By the time of his retirement in 2005, the company had significantly expanded its footprint, operating over 120 stores and achieving annual sales exceeding £148 million.

=== Politics ===
Apthorp was a councillor for Edgware from 1968 to 1974, and was given "Freedom of the Borough of Barnet" in 2008.

=== Charity ===
In 1982, Apthorp set up the Milly Apthorp Charitable Trust with his mother Milly. By 2014 it had supported arts projects and individuals with over £10million. He later set up the John Apthorp Charity, which funds projects in Hertfordshire, Bedfordshire, and Cambridgeshire.

== Personal life ==
Apthorp married Jane Arnold in 1959, and the couple had four children. By 2014, Apthorp's net worth was estimated at £125m, and by 2023 this had grown to £248m. Apthorp died after a short illness on 9 July 2024, at the age of 89.

Already an Officer of the Order of the British Empire (OBE), Apthorp was appointed Commander of the Order of the British Empire (CBE) in the 2014 New Year Honours for charitable services, particularly in Hertfordshire. He supported many local sports and organisations including sponsorship of Harrow RFC, financial support to hatcheries and salmon breeding at Tay Rivers and the Walton & Frinton Yacht Club who now host a race series in his memory.

In March 2025, Apthorp's rare wine collection was sold by Sotheby's.
