= Wall's (meat) =

Brand of meat products

- Product type: Sausages, meat pies
- Current owner: Compleat Food Group
- Country: United Kingdom
- Introduced: 1786; 240 years ago
- Related brands: Wall's (ice cream)
- Previous owners: Unilever
- Tagline: The Finest Cuts
- Website: Official website

Wall's is a brand of meat products in the United Kingdom, best known for its sausages. Founded in London in 1786 by butcher Richard Wall, it was acquired in 1922 by Lever Brothers, which became a part of Unilever in 1930.

== History ==
In 1786, Richard Wall opened a butcher's stall in St James's Market, London. Selling meat and meat products, he gained a reputation for being a fine pork butcher. In 1812, Wall received the first Royal Appointment to George, Prince of Wales as "Purveyor of Pork," continuing to serve him through his later reign as King George IV.

His son, Thomas Wall, was born in 1817, followed by a daughter, Eleanor, in 1824. Wall's business prospered, and in 1834 he moved to new premises at 113 Jermyn Street. However, he died the same year, leaving his widow, Ann, and the 17-year-old Thomas to run the business, now trading as Ann Wall and Son.

Two years later, in 1836, Ann also died, and Thomas Wall took sole charge of the business, as well as the care of his 14-year-old sister. However, the business continued to thrive. In 1846 his first son, Thomas Wall II, was born, followed shortly afterwards by a second son, Frederick. They joined the company board in 1870 and 1878 respectively, after which the business became known as Thomas Wall and Sons Ltd. Throughout this period, the business maintained its high-level standards and resultant recognition, receiving a series of Royal Appointments from Queen Victoria, King Edward VII and King George V.

The business had always faced problems in the summer, when sales of meat, meat pies and sausages declined, and staff had to be laid off as a consequence. Thus, in 1913, Thomas Wall II suggested developing a line of ice cream to avoid these problems. This proposal, however, was put on hold due to shortages arising as a result of the outbreak of World War I, and was not implemented until 1922. Before that, Thomas Wall II decided to retire, and in 1920 sold the business to Mac Fisheries, which itself was acquired by Lever Brothers in 1922.

In 1920, Thomas Wall II created his Trust for the "encouragement and assistance of educational work and social service". Today the Trust continues to assist in these areas by providing grants to individuals and organisations.

After the purchase of sausage and pâté producer Mattessons in 1965, Unilever ran both companies as part of Unilever Meat Group UK under the chairmanship of Werner Mattes, eventually merging the two companies to form Mattessons Wall's following his retirement in 1986.

Following a review, in 1994 Unilever sold off Mattessons Wall's, the ownership to the Mattessons brand, and a licence to sell meat products within the UK under the Wall's brand to Kerry Foods.
