= Mac Fisheries =

British fishmonger chain

- Type: Private company, Subsidiary
- Industry: Retail
- Founded: 1918
- Defunct: 1979
- Fate: Disposed/Closed
- Successor: International Stores
- Headquarters: Bracknell, Berkshire, UK
- Key people: William Lever, 1st Viscount Leverhulme (founder)
- Parent: Unilever (1922–1979)
- Subsidiaries: Mac Food Centres, Premier Supermarkets

Mac Fisheries was a branded United Kingdom retail chain of fishmongers, founded by William Lever, 1st Viscount Leverhulme, the co-founder with his brother of Lever Brothers, which later merged to become Unilever.

== Background ==
=== Isle of Lewis ===
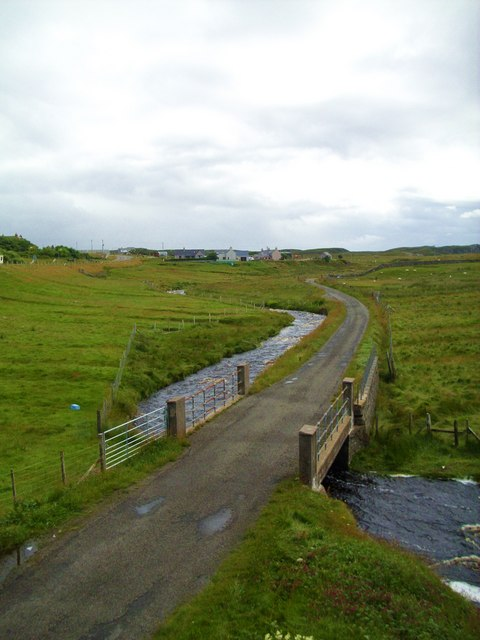
The Pentland Road at Carloway. It was originally laid out as the trackbed for a railway, planned and funded by Lord Leverhulme, who set out to improve the Lewis economy by setting up commercial fishing fleets which would unload their catches at improved west coast ports, with the fish being transported by rail to processing plants in Stornoway. The fish products would have been retailed through the chain of Mac Fisheries shops

In his thirties, Lord Leverhulme had taken a boat trip and fallen in love with the Western Isles of Scotland. In May 1918, at the age of 66, he bought the Isle of Lewis for £167,000. Convinced that he could resurrect the fishing industry, he set about investing in all aspects of the supporting industries and supply/distribution chain.

Leverhulme's plan was to build an ice-making plant in Stornoway, building refrigerated cargo ships to take fish to a depot at Fleetwood, where he would build herring-curing facilities, a canning factory and a plant installed to make fish cakes, fish paste, glue, animal feed and fertiliser. To create a market for the fish, he began to buy up independent fishmongers throughout Britain, rebranding them Mac Fisheries.

But in 1919, servicemen demobilised from World War I and promised land, started occupying plots on the Isle of Lewis. Leverhulme protested and took legal action against the people he considered squatters, but the Scottish Office took the side of the ex-servicemen, leaving Leverhulme's plan in tatters. Leverhulme announced that he would leave Lewis in 1923, offering to gift the Isle to the locals. But suspicion ran so high, that he was forced to sell again to long-term absentee landlords.

=== Leverburgh ===
In late 1919, Leverhulme purchased the South Harris estate from the Earl of Dunmore for the sum of £36,000. Taking in the Western Isles fishing village of Obbe, he planned to turn it into a consolidated major fishing centre, with product distributed through the Mac Fisheries shops. In 1920, Obbe with local consent was rebranded Leverburgh, and 300 men started work on a new pier and seashore infrastructure for processing the product from 50 berthed trawlers. Shore side construction covered an accommodation block, curing sheds, smoke houses, a refrigeration building, store sheds, houses for the managers and a 20 car garage.

With a second stage of development planned that would have seen the inner sea loch converted into a harbour to accommodate 200+ trawlers, fitted with a sea lock to ensure a constant 25 feet (7.6 m) depth, Leverhulme paid for upgraded roads to accommodate the additional traffic. After purchasing the London butchers Wall's in 1920, the economic downturn of 1920–21 slowed development, resulting in the London-based Mac Fisheries being incorporated into Lever Brothers Ltd in 1922. By 1924 Leverburgh was ready to start production, and 12 Great Yarmouth drifters landed a quantity of herring so great, that extra female employees were taken in from the mainland to handle the catch.

After what was to be his last visit to Leverburgh in September 1924, Leverhulme took a trip to Africa, where he developed pneumonia. After his death in Hampstead, his executors and the board of Lever Brothers had no interest in the project and so ended all work, selling off village and production facilities for £5,000, and estate for £300. It is estimated the project cost Leverhulme £500,000.

== Retail chain ==
In 1930, a merger of the major palm oil consumers, the British soapmaker Lever Brothers and Dutch margarine producer Margarine Unie, created the foods conglomerate known as Unilever. The company's main focus was overseas expansion by distribution of its manufactured foods products outside its two core markets. The company allowed its in-country operations considerable independence, as long as they made a profit. The head office of Mac Fisheries Ltd was at Ocean House, Pudding Lane, London EC3; its emblem was a roundel in blue and white showing the Scottish saltire with four fish between its arms and the motto "For all fish".

=== World War Two ===
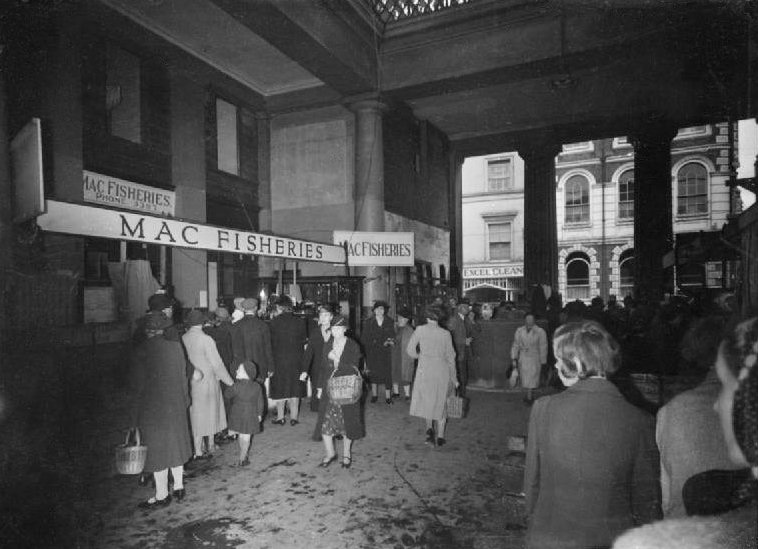
A Mac Fisheries market stall in the Higher Market, Exeter, Devon, 1943

Mac Fisheries was thus left alone; it bought fish wholesale, both from Unilever sources as well as in the open market. It did not expand much until the Second World War, when meat which had to be mainly imported was rationed, resulting in a boom in the fish trade. To keep fishermen safe, the government introduced a protected zoning scheme of trawlers, under which they landed fish in different ports each week. Mac Fisheries became adept at communicating to their stores when fresh fish would reach them, resulting in signs in shop windows stating when the next fresh fish delivery was due.

=== Challenge and development ===
Food rationing in the UK finally ended in 1954, and together with the wider introduction of American-developed frozen products such as Unilever's own Birds Eye fish fingers, meant a decline in wet-fish sales, and a decline for Mac Fisheries. The management turned the chain towards multi-line retailing, introducing fresh vegetables, dairy products and some canned produce. But now shop size proved a problem, as the originally purchased retail estate from 1920 had not been expanded.

This resulted in the chain moving to larger scale shops in the late 1950s, often on different streets or different parts of the town. But the new multi-line stores proved successful in reviving the chain's fortune, and spurred the growth of the chain into the new concept of supermarket based retail. To expand its footprint Mac Fisheries sought a merger, and found a willing seller in Express Dairies, which wished to dispose of its chain Premier Supermarkets. Express had seen the problem of being both a wholesale supplier to supermarkets such as Fine Fare, Gateway, Sainsbury's and Tesco, as well as a retail competitor in Premier: the same problem that would eventually lead to Mac Fisheries' disposal and closure some 15 years later. Express also needed the cash to develop long-life milk, which the funds from the sale of Premier would allow it to launch.

=== Merger with Premier Supermarkets ===
Express put Premier up for sale in April 1964, and concluded a deal with Unilever in May 1964 for £1 million. The Premier stores were rebranded as Macfisheries Food Centres, which were the new format multi-line large footprint stores. Derek Nunn, Mac Fisheries' Sales Director pre-takeover, considered the title supermarket brash, hence the name "Food Centre", but due to public opinion the title slipped back in and eventually stayed.

Again estate problems brought issues for Mac Fisheries. Coming second or third into a particular town with the supermarket concept, the new Food Centres were often in the wrong/quiet part of town. This resulted in increased sales thanks to the footprint increase, but financial performance under target. This slowed store roll out, and there were only 50 Food Centres by the end of 1964. After a period of rationalisation, and a return to profitability, the Supermarket Division was renamed to Mac Market, using a new colour scheme, based on orange over the traditional blue and white. The Macfisheries fish shops continued to trade and were wound down in the light of profitability.

Mac Fisheries developed new distribution systems based on Unilever's expertise, taking over an unused Finefare distribution warehouse in Farnborough, Hampshire. Mac Markets introduced computerised systems to both distribution and retail that was the first high street introduction of the instore computerisation to consumer retailing using the SLIM system developed by ICL. However, the family concepts from both the original fish mongers and Unilever were retained, with gold watches given to staff with 17 years of service.

By the early 1970s, Unilever was becoming aware of the dichotomy of being both a wholesale supplier and a retailer. Unilever tried to stress to its other supermarket customers that Mac Fisheries did not get a pricing advantage over them, and yet as the science of food retailing developed, it was clear that Unilever was giving guidance to Mac Fisheries on placing Unilever products in the most prominent positions.

=== Closure ===
Mac Markets' competed with other supermarket brands which were expanding far more quickly, resulting in their lower prices and higher profits. The result was that, by 1973, while Mac Fisheries Group had a turnover of £50million, its margins were smaller. Secondly, the development of out of town retail parks with another change of estate footprint required new investment in the business, something which Unilever was by now reluctant to do as it was supply the competition as well as being a retailer.

The result was a cost-cutting period in 1975, resulting in loss-making store closures and staff reductions, particularly at the group's headquarters in Bracknell, Berkshire.

In April 1979, the Food Centres were sold to International Stores, while the residual wet fish shops were simply closed down within the following three months.
