= Adrian Flanagan =

British author, sailor and sculptor

- Born: 1 October 1960 (age 65); Nairobi, Kenya
- Occupations: Author, sailor, sculptor
- Known for: Completing the world's first single-handed vertical circumnavigation, author and sculptor
- Notable work: Over the Top: Attempting the World's First Single-Handed Vertical Circumnavigation of the World
- Website: www.adrianflanagansculpture.com

Adrian Flanagan (born 1 October 1960 in Nairobi, Kenya) is a British author, sailor and sculptor. On 21 May 2008, Flanagan achieved the first ever single-handed vertical circumnavigation (via the geographical poles) of the globe.

Flanagan has written three books: The Cape Horners' Club (Bloomsbury hardback 2017),Over the Top: The First Lone Yachtsman to Sail Vertically Around the World (Weidenfeld & Nicolson hardback 2008, paperback 2009), and Cobra (Hale Publishing 2001).

Flanagan now works as a sculptor. Harnessing his childhood experiences in Africa and his love of nature, he specializes in wildlife. Working in clay, polymer clay, Plastilin, and mixed media, his work is cast in bronze as limited editions.
