= Mainstop =

British supermarket chain

- Company type: Subsidiary
- Industry: Supermarket/Retail
- Founded: 1981 (45 years ago)
- Defunct: 1983
- Headquarters: England and Wales
- Number of locations: 22 (at peak)
- Products: Grocery, bakery, dairy, deli, frozen food, general merchandise, meat, produce, seafood
- Parent: British American Tobacco

Mainstop was a British supermarket chain, with branches across the whole of England, and parts of Wales, for a period from the early eighties. Mainstop branches were large general grocery stores, often featuring in store specialist departments, such as butchers and bakeries.

The corporate logo consisted of four interlaced rectangles, forming an approximation of the "hash" symbol (#) from a computer font set, turned through 45°, or the letter "x" printed twice, so as to overlap. This logo was used in signage and marketing, and on promotional items, including coffee mugs widely distributed through the early 1980s, at the opening ceremonies of new branches.

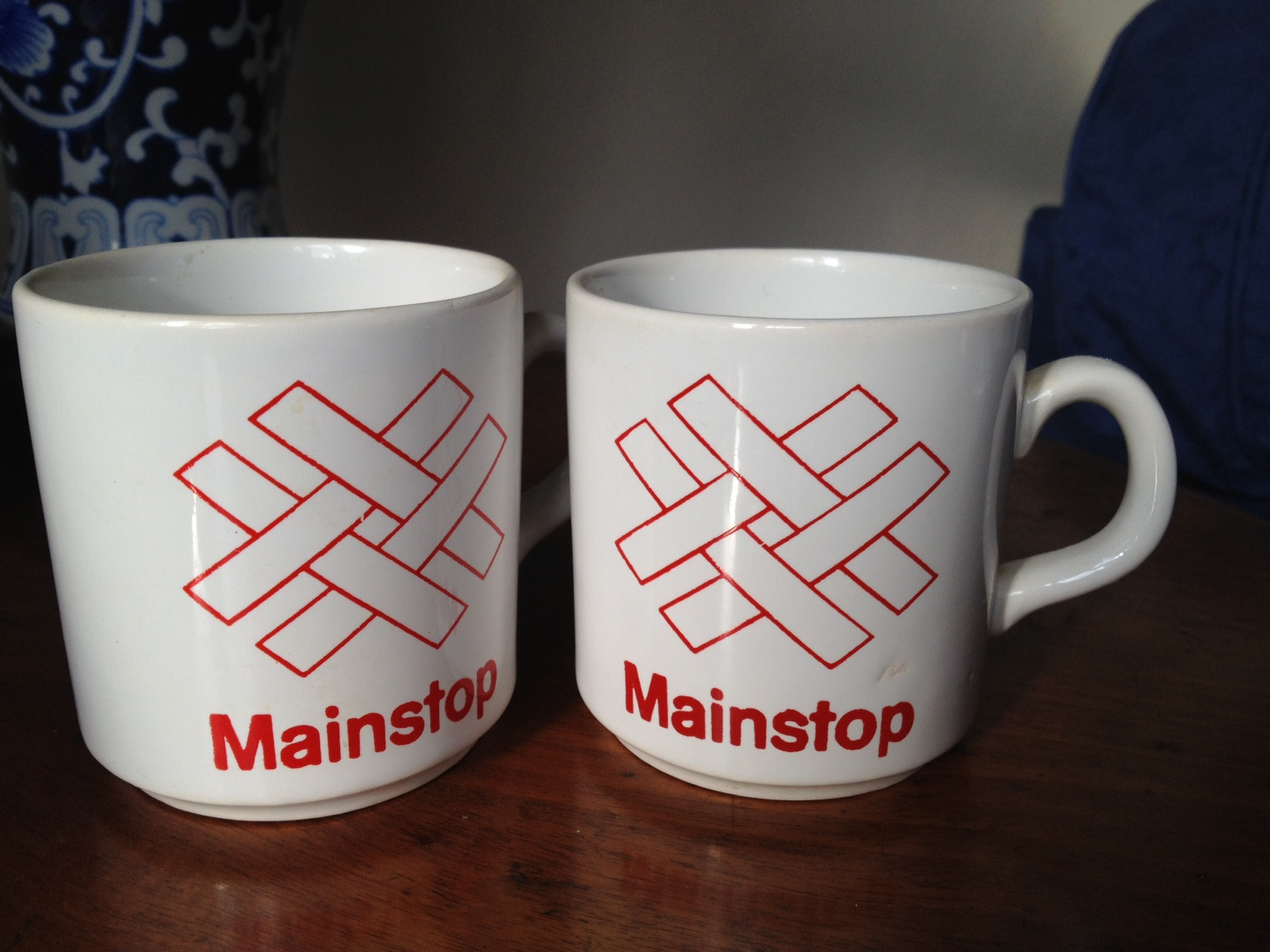
The Mainstop corporate logo illustrated on two promotional coffee mugs.

Mainstop was originally part of International Stores, itself a subsidiary of British American Tobacco. In the late 1970s, the largest International Stores were rebranded as 'Big I', and finally in 1981 as Mainstop, although the Torquay branch was rebranded as Supernational.

The 22 Mainstop stores ran at a loss during their brief existence, and therefore eight were returned to the International Stores fold in 1983 (until Gateway took them over), whilst the remaining 15 were sold to Morrisons, Co-op and Presto in 1983.
