= GT Smith =

English supermarket chain

Company Logo

GT Smith, named after the person who created it, was a small, family owned supermarket chain based in Knottingley near Pontefract, in West Yorkshire, England. The main branch was located on Marine Villa Road in Knottingley, with other branches in nearby Ossett, Pontefract, South Elmsall, Castleford, Goldthorpe, Ackworth, Meanwood, Leeds, Kippax, Outwood and Normanton.

GT Smith was famous for fresh provisions, which were produced at GT Smith's own bakery in Townville, Castleford. Morrisons acquired the GT Smith flagship branch in Knottingley and demolished it, opening their new shop in 2004. The company was bought by The Co-operative Group in May 2002, for a reported £15 million.

GT Smith also owned a store in Ossett which the Co-operative took over. This store was subsequently closed in 2003, due to presence of an existing Co-operative store in the town.
