= Farmfoods =

British frozen food retailer

Farmfoods Limited

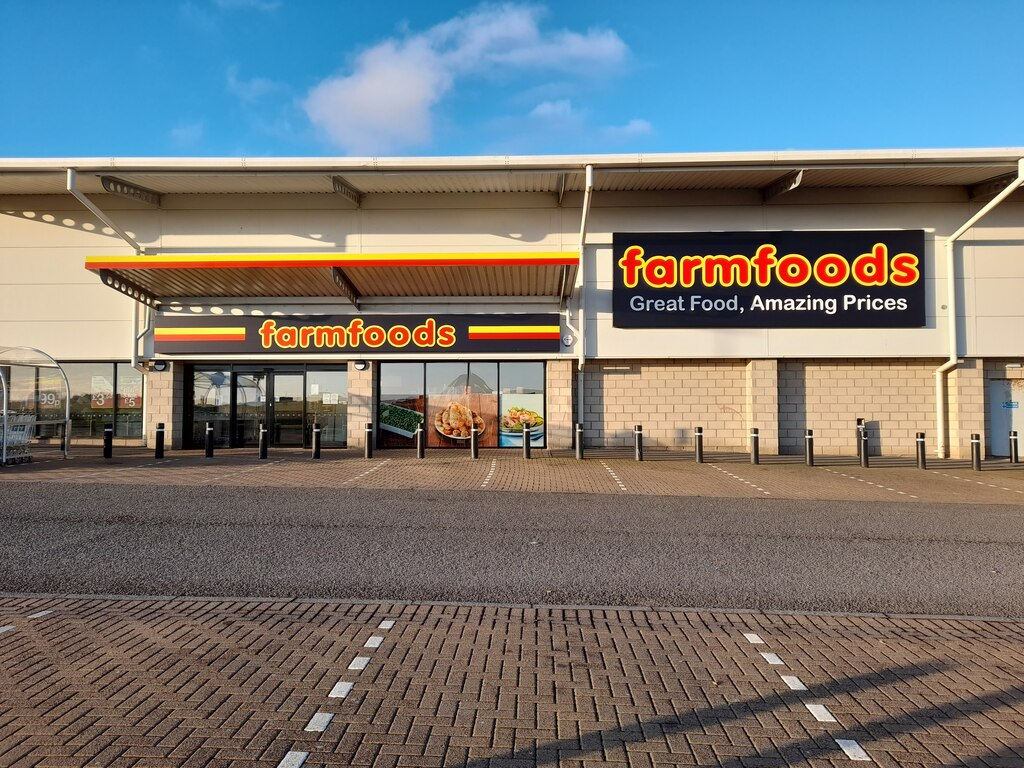
- A Farmfoods store in Wick, Scotland
- Formerly: Farmfoods (Aberdeen) Limited (1954–1993)
- Type: Private limited company
- Industry: Retail
- Founded: 8 July 1954; 72 years ago in Aberdeen, Scotland, UK
- Headquarters: Cumbernauld, Scotland, UK
- Number of locations: 340+ (As of January 2023)
- Key people: George Herd (CEO)
- Products: Frozen foods; Groceries
- Revenue: ▲£1.121 billion (2024)
- Operating income: ▼£9.89 million (2024)
- Net income: ▲£23.1 million (2024)
- Website: farmfoods.co.uk

Farmfoods Limited is a British frozen food and grocery supermarket chain based in Cumbernauld, Scotland. It is owned by Eric Herd, and has over three hundred shops in the United Kingdom, of which more than a hundred are in Scotland. It primarily focuses on frozen foods, but they also stock a range of grocery, fresh produce, chilled, household, electrical and beauty products.

== History ==
=== Establishment ===
The company started in 1954 as a meat-processing business. A shop was opened in Aberdeen in the 1970s, and by the mid-1980s, the company had about twenty outlets. In the 1990s, it bought Capital Freezer Centres and Wallis Frozen Foods. In 2005, it had annual sales of just over £400 million, the highest of any private mid-market firm in Scotland in that year, and fourth-highest in the United Kingdom.

=== Proposed Iceland takeover ===
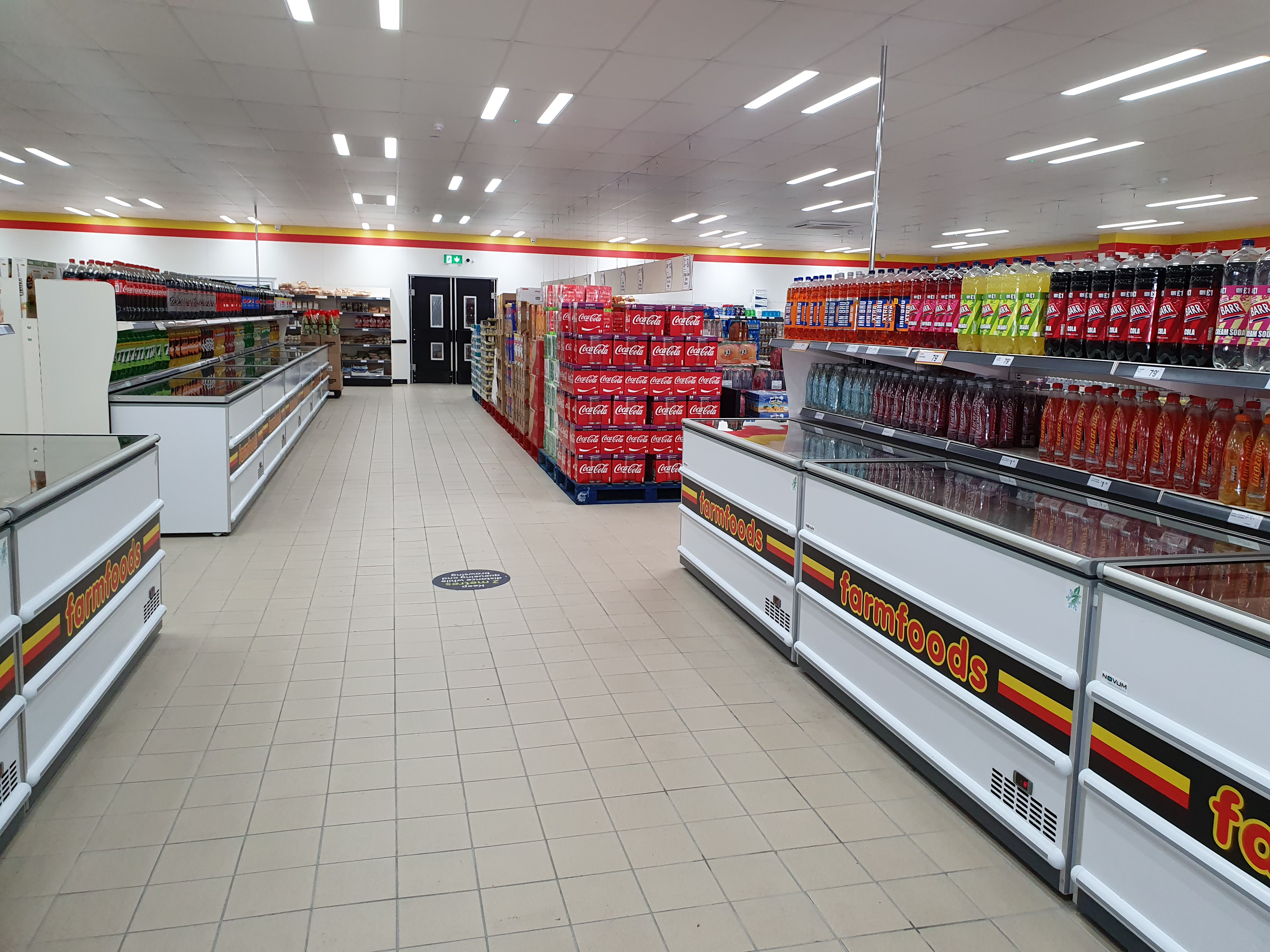
Interior layout of Farmfoods in Harlow, Essex

In 2011, Farmfoods and Asda made an unsuccessful bid for Iceland; Farmfoods would have acquired two hundred of the eight hundred stores.

=== Expansion and revamp ===
In recent years, Farmfoods have been opening larger stores and closing smaller ones as they enlarge their non-food range. They have also taken over numerous old Aldi and Lidl supermarket sites.

In 2023, Farmfoods began revamping some of their stores with a new interior design.

In May 2024, Farmfoods announced an expansion plan that would mean opening 20-to-30 new stores a year, with more stores in the London area being a priority. In the first four months of 2024, Farmfoods secured sites for 24 new stores throughout the country.

The company is headquartered in Cumbernauld, North Lanarkshire, with some head office functions operating out of Solihull and Yardley, Birmingham in the West Midlands.

== Animal welfare ==
In 2016, Farmfoods committed to stop sourcing eggs from hens confined in colony cages by the end of 2025. In September 2025, it abandoned this commitment and stated that it would continue to sell caged eggs, prompting criticism from animal welfare campaigners including The Humane League UK. As of 2025, Farmfoods is the only major UK retailer without a time-bound commitment to sell only free-range eggs.

== Discount vouchers ==
Farmfoods does not offer a loyalty scheme, but instead provides discount vouchers (for example £2.00 off a £25 spend or £5.00 off £60). The weekly vouchers are available through signing up for emails from Farmfoods or leaflet drops.
