= Alec Monk =

British businessman

David Alec George Monk (13 December 1942 – 19 June 2022), better known as Alec Monk, was a British businessman and former chairman and chief executive of the supermarket chain Gateway and former chairman of the brewing company Charles Wells Ltd.

== Life ==
Monk was educated at Jesus College, Oxford, from 1962 to 1965, obtaining a degree in PPE. He was then part of the research staff on corporate finance and taxation at Sheffield University and the London Business School before working for Rio Tinto Zinc, becoming a director in 1974. After being vice-president and director of AEA Investors from 1977, he became chairman and chief executive of Gateway in 1981, remaining in post until 1989. He was a member of the now-defunct National Economic Development Council from 1986 to 1990, and was president of the Institute of Grocery Distribution from 1987 to 1989. Between 1998 and 2003 he was chairman of Charles Wells. He was made an Honorary Fellow of St Hugh's College, Oxford, in 1985 and awarded an honorary doctorate by Sheffield University in 1988. In 1999, he was made an Honorary Fellow of Jesus College. He was appointed a Foundation Fellow of New Hall, Cambridge in 2001.

Monk died in southern England, on 19 June 2022, at the age of 79.
