= Plymouth & South West Co-operative Society =

Plymouth and South West Co-operative Society Limited
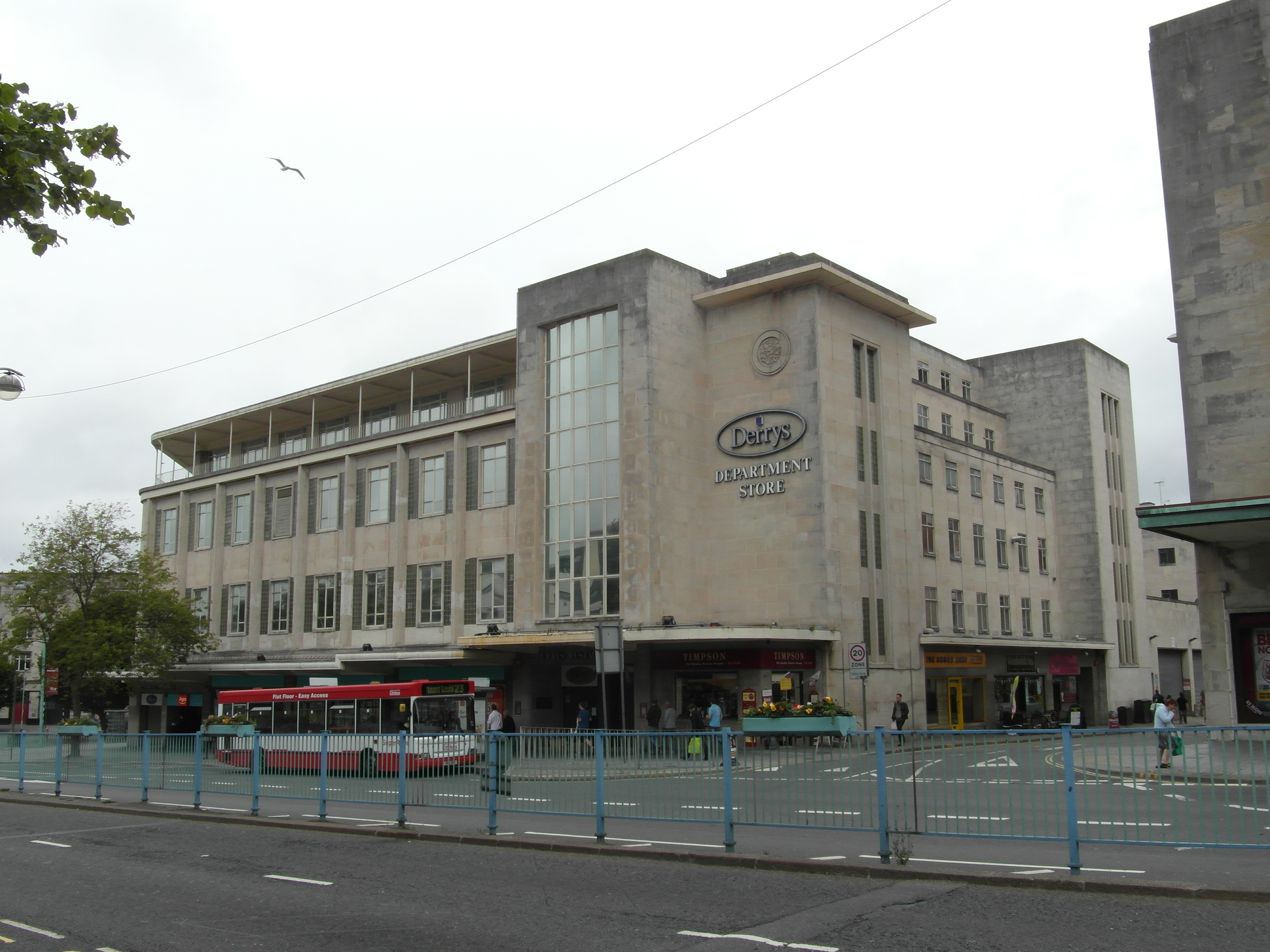
- The society's headquarters and department store in the centre of Plymouth, opened in 1952.
- Company type: Consumers' Co-operative
- Founded: 1859
- Defunct: 6 September 2009
- Headquarters: Plymouth, England
- Area served: Cornwall, Devon
- Members: 130,000
- Website: psw.coop

The Plymouth and South West Co-operative Society Limited, known locally as Plymco, was founded in 1859 by ten tradesmen. The society grew from 18 members, as recorded on 3 January 1860, to a membership of over 130,000. The department store business was sold to Vergo Retail in 2009.

Members approved a merger with the larger Co-operative Group (of which the society was a corporate member) at a series of members' meetings during 2009. The merger occurred on 6 September 2009.
