= Victor Value =

Defunct British supermarket group

- Company type: Private
- Defunct: 1989
- Successor: Kwiksave
- Products: Groceries

Victor Value was a London-based value supermarket group that operated at the discount end of the grocery trade.

The brand was started by the group London Grocers, who also ran London United Grocers, Bernard Best, Newmans Stores and Titus Ward & Co. In 1965, the rival supermarket chain Anthony Jackson Foodfare was purchased, which added a further 61 stores to the Victor Value chain.

In 1968, Victor Value had 217 stores, and was sold to Tesco for £1.75 million. Tesco converted many larger branches to their own brand including some to Tesco Home n' Wear, and closed a number of smaller branches which were in close proximity to an established Tesco store, while those that retained the Victor Value fascia traded at the budget end of the market. Prior to Tesco's purchase, the board of Victor Value had decided to drop S & H Pink saving stamps, using the £1 million it had cost to discount goods instead. The purchase of Victor Value by Tesco and trying to integrate it nearly brought the company down. Old Victor Value stores which survived after conversion to Tesco could, for some time, be identified by their distinctive blue and white tiled frontage.

At the beginning of the 1980s, some smaller town centre Tesco stores were rebranded as Victor Value. These town centre stores, including ones in Huyton and Bexleyheath, were used to trial new scanning and barcode technologies, before launching them as Tesco-branded stores. In 1986, frozen food supermarket chain Bejam purchased the 45 store chain from Tesco, itself being taken over by rival Iceland in January 1989. Victor Value's remaining stores were sold by Iceland to British discount supermarket chain Kwik Save.
