= Bejam =

British frozen food supermarket chain, 1968–1989

Bejam Group plc
- Type: Private
- Founded: 1968
- Defunct: 1989
- Successor: Iceland
- Headquarters: Stanmore, England
- Products: Groceries

Bejam was a British frozen food supermarket chain founded by John Apthorp in 1968, based in Stanmore, London. The business grew to become the biggest frozen food retailer and largest seller of freezers and microwaves in Britain. The business was purchased by smaller rival, Iceland, in a hostile takeover in 1989.

== History ==
The concept of selling only frozen foods was a novel idea in 1968. John Apthorp, worked for E. A. D. Apthorp, his family's firm of potato merchants, which was bought out by the Ross Group in 1968. Apthorp did not like working within the larger organisation, so left and opened a single store in Edgware as Bejam Bulk Buying in 1968 selling frozen foods. The name, Bejam was an acronym for Brian, Eric, John and Milly and Marion, the names of the Apthorp family members. At the time Britain was behind continental Europe in freezer ownership with less than 1% of households owning one, but by 1973 it had grown to around two million homes. By 1973, Bejam had expanded to 72 stores, not just selling frozen food but also freezers; a pioneer in the marketplace. Meanwhile, in the same year Bejam was listed on the London Stock Exchange. The company had many subsidiaries supplying frozen food to the business, including the jointly owned Meatpak Hampshire. Bejam would also buy 50% of Smeets Diepvries, B.V., a Netherlands wholesale distributor of frozen foods in 1973, eventually opening three Bejam stores in the Netherlands. In 1974, the company opened a new jointly owned 3,300,000-square-foot (310,000 m^{2}) cold store in Milton Keynes with the National Freight Corporation.

The company grew very quickly during the 1970s, and by 1978 had grown to 147 stores with 463,000-square-foot (43,000 m^{2}) of sales space making £2.34 million of profit on £44.23 million turnover. The appliances division joined up with Barclays Bank in 1976 to offer customers credit on fridges and freezers sold in-store. Bejam continued to grow and in 1979 announced record profits of £6.04 million, and had continued to grow in the interim profits report of 1980 to £4.1 million, with the company's share price sitting at 59p. The company diversified in 1979 by purchasing 38 restaurants from EMI for £4.78 million, mostly operating under Wimpy and Tennessee Pancake fascias, and announced plans to open a fast food chain called Trumps, with the first branch opening in Romford. However, the fast food experiment failed, with 22 of the branches sold in 1980, and in 1981 the business withdrew from the market with a write-down of £1.9 million. However, this did not affect the company's profits, and it generated pre-tax profits of £9 million. On the freezer shop front, Bejam purchased seven supermarket sites from BAT for £1.37 million in 1980, and 16 freezer centres owned by Fine Fare.

By 1982, the company turnover had on food sales alone had grown to £208 million. In 1984, the company opened its 200th store in Woodley, Berkshire with a ceremony with Anne, Princess Royal and her then husband Mark Phillips. The firm went head to head with Iceland in 1985, to purchase twelve of failed freezer food chain Orchard Foods' stores, but lost out to a £910,000 bid by the rival chain. This saw Iceland gain its first stores in Bejam's territory. By 1986, this had grown to 226 freezer centres and this was further enhanced by the purchase of 45 Victor Value stores from Tesco in 1986. John Apthorp had contacted Malcolm Walker of Iceland, in 1986 about purchasing the business, in which he still held 30% of the shares but after initial conversations, there were no further developments. In 1987, the business expanded with the purchases of Lowfreeze, the freezer shop brand of Scottish supermarket chain, Wm Low, nine of the former Sainsbury's Freezer Centres and retailer Wizard Wine. The company's shares rose from 158p to 210p on rumours that both Iceland and Hazelwood Foods were lining up bids and it was announced that John Apthorp had handed over day-to-day running of the business to Timothy How. The Iceland link was genuine, with Apthorp and Walker agreeing a price of 230p per share. However, the Bejam board could not agree on the deal and Apthorp would not offer a guarantee to sell his shares to Iceland if he received a higher bid.

In 1988, Iceland made a hostile takeover bid for Bejam, initially in a share offer of 123p per share, a deal totalling £240 million. Apthorp stated that the offer was inadequate and substantially undervalues Bejam, while Walker criticised Bejam for not issuing a profit forecast. Iceland then amended its offer to include part cash, part share at 187p. However, the market was unimpressed, with Bejam's share price dropping to 170p and Apthorp said he would not accept the offer. On the 30 December, Lloyd's Bank, the registrar for the share offer declared that 50.09% of the shareholders in Bejam had accepted the offer.

== See also ==
- List of companies based in London

== Bibliography ==
- Adrian Room, Corporate Eponymy: A Biographical Dictionary of the Persons Behind the Names, Page 17, McFarland & Co, 1992, ISBN 0-89950-679-8
- Adrian Room, Dictionary of Trade Name Origins, Page 38, Routledge, 1982, ISBN 0-7102-0174-5
- David Boylan, Antony Head, Corporate Finance: Principles & Practice, Page 314, Pearson Education, 2007, ISBN 0-273-70644-6
