= Somerfield =

1875–2011 UK supermarket chain

Somerfield Stores Ltd
- Type: Private
- Industry: Retail
- Founded: 1875; 151 years ago
- Defunct: 2011; 15 years ago
- Fate: Brand retired in favour of parent's "The Co-operative" brand
- Headquarters: Bristol, England, UK (1875–2009); Manchester, England, UK (2009–2011)
- Products: Groceries
- Revenue: £4.221 billion (2007 – 2008)
- Net income: £226 million
- Owner: The Co-operative Group
- Number of employees: 50,000
- Parent: The Co-operative Food

Somerfield (/ˈsʌmərfiːld/ SUM-ər-feeld) was a chain of small to medium-sized supermarkets operating in the United Kingdom. The business started life in the 19th century as grocers J. H. Mills, and after a series of buyouts and mergers, the company became known as Gateway. A major rebranding to the newly-created Somerfield brand started in 1990, and in 1998 the company purchased the Kwik Save chain of discount food stores. The company was taken over by the Co-operative Group on 2 March 2009 in a £1.57 billion deal, creating the UK's fifth-largest food retailer. The Somerfield name was replaced by the Co-operative brand in a rolling programme of store conversions ending in summer 2011.

== Gateway history ==
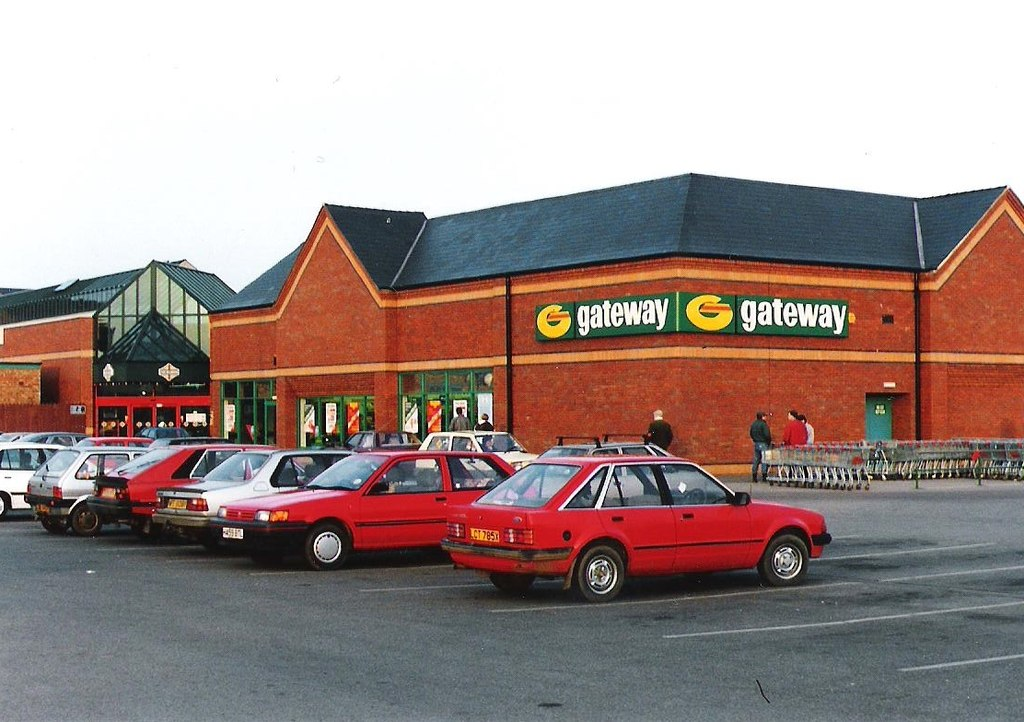
A Gateway supermarket in Skegness, Lincolnshire in 1992

=== The early years ===
The company had its origins in a Bristol-based grocer known as J.H. Mills which was founded in 1875 and which developed a self-service supermarket chain named Gateway Foodmarkets in 1960. During the early 1970s, Gateway operated primarily in the southwest of England with a few stores elsewhere. Ford and Lock stores and S&H Pink Stamp acquisitions took place during the period when loyalty stamps were prevalent and the first freezer centres were opened. Gateway Foodmarkets was taken over by Linfood Holdings, a consortium which already owned the Frank Dee Supermarkets which operated over the north and east of England. At the time, Frank Dee Supermarkets and the larger DEE Discount stores were a business larger than Gateway and had a chain of 79 supermarkets, in 1977. In 1983, Linfood Holdings was renamed the Dee Corporation. Initial plans were proposed to utilise the distribution depots on three main sites; the thriving Frank Dee's purpose built facilities in Anlaby and Billingham, and the existing Gateway warehousing site in Bristol.

=== Acquisitions ===
Alec Monk, chief executive of the Dee Corporation, having escaped a takeover bid from Argyll Foods in 1981, decided to create his own supermarket empire. Three of the biggest acquisitions were of Key Markets Supermarkets from Fitch Lovell, International Stores, bought from British American Tobacco in 1984, and Fine Fare, bought from Associated British Foods the following year. The company also purchased the UK arm of the French retailer, Carrefour when the French retailer exited Britain in the late 1980s. By this time, the Dee Corporation had over 1,100 stores and nearly 12% of the market, not far behind Sainsbury's and Tesco. Most of the Dee Corporation's outlets were small, high-street stores. Monk argued that there was a future for well-run conventional supermarkets as well as the large out-of-town stores.

However, by 1987 the Dee Corporation had run into problems, mainly because of the difficulty of integrating so many disparate businesses. Some disposals were made in that year, including the Linfood wholesaling operation. In 1988, the Dee Corporation changed its name to the Gateway Corporation, and a new retailing chief was recruited from the US. Investors remained sceptical, and in 1989 the company was the subject of a £2bn takeover bid from a newly formed company, Isosceles; the deal was partly financed by a pre-arranged sale of 61 Gateway stores to Asda.

=== Isosceles era ===
When Isosceles, a newly created financial group led by David Smith and backed by several big investment institutions, bid successfully for Gateway in 1989 and took the company private, the plan was to restructure the business and refocus it on what were called "middle ground" outlets, falling between the larger out of town superstores and smaller, inner-city neighbourhood shops; the average size of the stores was between 5,000 sq ft (460 m^{2}) and 10,000 sq ft (930 m^{2}). The promoters of the Isosceles bid believed that, after this disposal and extensive restructuring of the rest of the portfolio, Gateway could become a viable competitor; the intention was to re-float the company on the stock market within three to five years. However, the bid was highly leveraged, and it was not clear that the new company would be able to fund the necessary modernisation of the business.

Some of the planned disposals of non-core businesses took longer than expected to complete. Financial strains led to the enforced departure of David Smith and other executives in 1991.

== Somerfield history ==
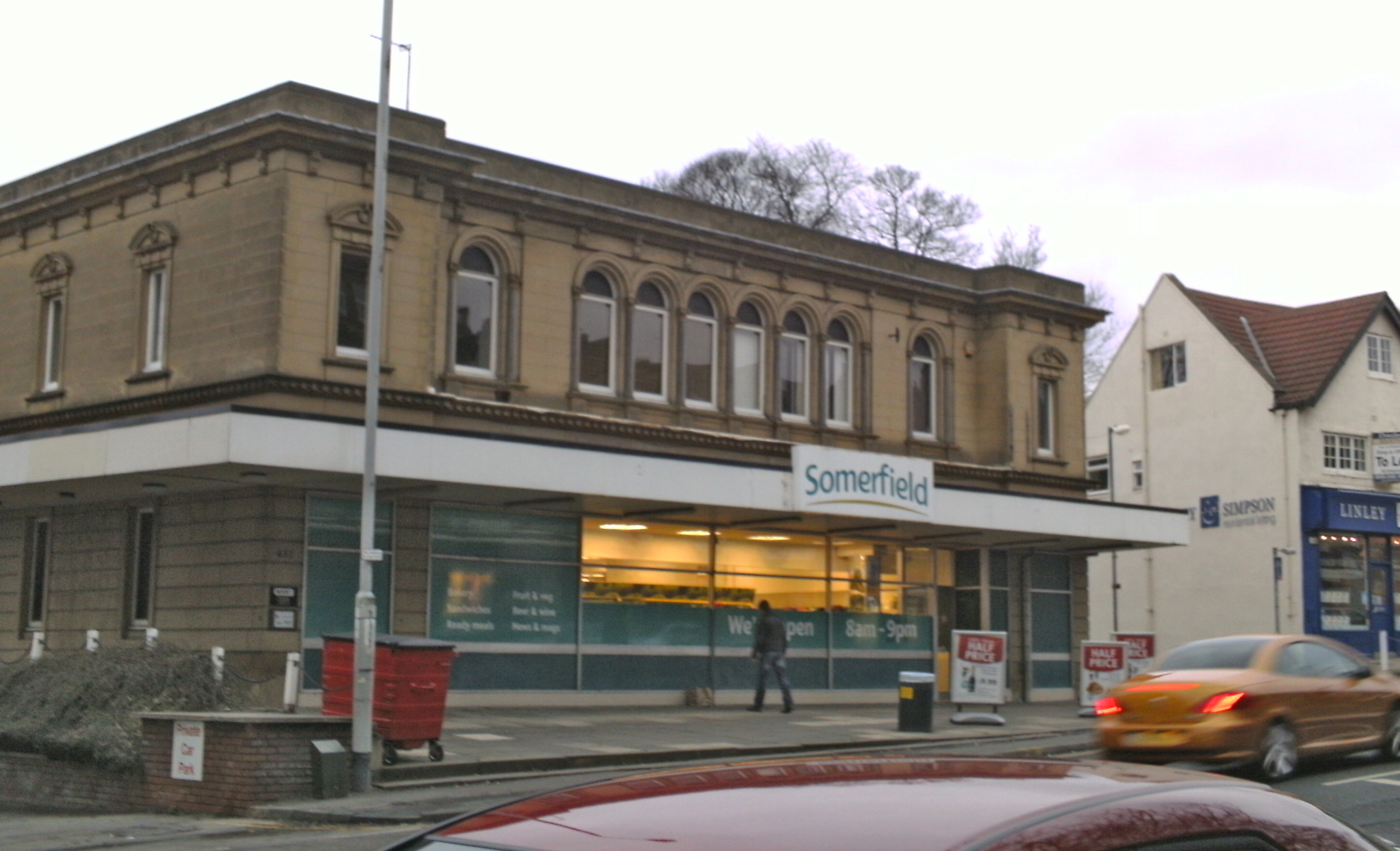
A Somerfield (former Safeway) in Oakwood, Leeds

In the following year, a new chief executive, Bob Willett, was appointed and a decision was taken to rebrand the company's operations as Somerfield after a successful pilot scheme in 1990 with a new store and the first Somerfield store in the country being built in Burnham on Sea, Somerset, and the company then built its success upon the new brand alongside the existing Gateway chain. A small number of stores were also relaunched under a new Food Giant discount brand, with the first store opening in Nottingham in 1991.

Two years later, a further chief executive, David Simons, was in the post. In May 1994, the company changed its name to Somerfield plc.

According to The Guardian newspaper, the holding company almost collapsed in the 1990s under a "mountain of debt". In 1996, Somerfield plc was floated on the stock market in an initial public offering, after the recovery had reached the point where flotation became feasible with a market value of around £600M, and the proceeds were used to repay banks that had lent to Isosceles. At the time of the flotation the company's market share had fallen to 5.3%, its lowest level for two years, but Simons claimed that the company was now clearly positioned in the market, and that the business would benefit from what he saw as the trend back towards high-street shopping. The aim was to become the UK's strongest neighbourhood food retailer.

Questions remained about whether, at a time of intense competition both from discounters and from the larger chains, Somerfield could generate adequate growth in sales and profits.

In 1997, the Somerfield website was launched, which gave customers access to viewing online content such as offers, services and recipes, as well as online shopping via the chain's free Home Delivery service.

=== Slogans ===
- "Savings that add up" (1995–1997)
- "Shopping in the real world" (1997–2001)
- "Good food made easy" (2002–2004)
- "Somerthing Different" (2004–2005)
- "A great deal going on" (2005–2006)
- "Giving you what you want" (2006–2007)
- "Pop in to Somerfield" (2007–2010)
- "Good with Food" (2010–2011)

=== Kwik Save purchase ===
In 1998, the company took over the Kwik Save chain in a £473 million transaction. Although the deal was billed as a merger of equals, Somerfield investors owned 62.5% of the enlarged group.

Observers questioned whether putting together two very different businesses would solve either's problems. The initial plan was to convert most of the Kwik Save stores to the Somerfield branding, but the group continued to suffer from a disparate store portfolio, the result of numerous ill-digested acquisitions by Kwik Save prior to the Somerfield takeover. At the end of 1999, Simons, facing strong criticism from the city, announced plans to sell a third of the company's 1,400 stores. He admitted that the group had underestimated the difference between Somerfield and Kwik Save, and had failed to support and maintain the Kwik Save brand. A few months later Simons resigned.

The original plan to transfer all Kwik Save stores to the Somerfield branding was quickly abandoned after it became clear that many outlets were not suitable for conversion, either due to size or location. Also, the downmarket wooden shelving and poor quality fittings used by Kwik Save meant that every conversion required a full refurbishment of the store – simply changing the signage and uniforms would have risked dragging the carefully developed Somerfield brand downmarket.

Instead, the larger Kwik Save stores were converted, some were sold or closed and the chain became a trading division of Somerfield Stores Ltd, sharing its supply chain and back office systems with Somerfield. For some years, the own brand products in Kwik Save stores were Somerfield, although this policy was reversed once it was decided to keep the brand.

Somerfield's existing Food Giant discount supermarkets were rebranded as Kwik Save.

It was clear that more than a hundred Somerfield and Kwik Save stores were within a mile of each other and directly competing: also customers were switching from high street to out of town shopping.

=== Somerfield Direct ===
Somerfield launched a home shopping pilot in the Bristol area under the name Somerfield Direct in early 1999. As a call centre operated service, customers would telephone the company to order Somerfield produce, which would be delivered direct from the warehouse. After the launch, Somerfield bought Supermarket Direct in April 1999 for £3.25 million to extend the range of Somerfield Direct, and Supermarket Direct partners Dominick Scott-Flanagan and David Noble joined the Somerfield Direct board. At the time, Somerfield Direct only covered the South West of England from its base in Bristol. With the incorporation of Supermarket Direct, Somerfield Direct extended its range to the London area.

While other home shopping services were providing internet ordering, at this point Somerfield Direct was a catalogue and call-centre operation, chief executive Simons expressing the view that "Mrs Smith in Stockport is more likely to use a handy catalogue from her supermarket than surf the Net in search for Fido's dog food". The operation launched internet ordering in July 1999, and was then rebranded as "Somerfield 24-7". At its peak the home shopping division employed 225 staff and operated from three distribution centres.

However, Somerfield suffered large losses in 2000, its home shopping venture was described as an "ill-fated foray", and development was halted that June.

=== John von Spreckelsen ===
John von Spreckelsen, former chief executive of convenience food retailer Budgens, was brought in as chairman in April 2000. The new strategy was to keep Somerfield and Kwik Save as separate businesses, while sharing common services in such areas as information technology and corporate finance. By mid-2002 – halfway through what was seen as a five-year recovery programme – the company announced a return to the black, and dividends were resumed after a two-year break, although the positioning issues remained unsolved.

Somerfield was the product of opportunistic acquisitions, driven more by financial engineering than by any conception of where the company should be positioned. The focus on medium-sized high street supermarkets was largely a matter of making the best of a very difficult job; the main problem, which had not been solved by the end of the 1980s, was to make some sense of the heterogeneous collection of stores which it had acquired through its numerous takeovers.

=== New formats ===
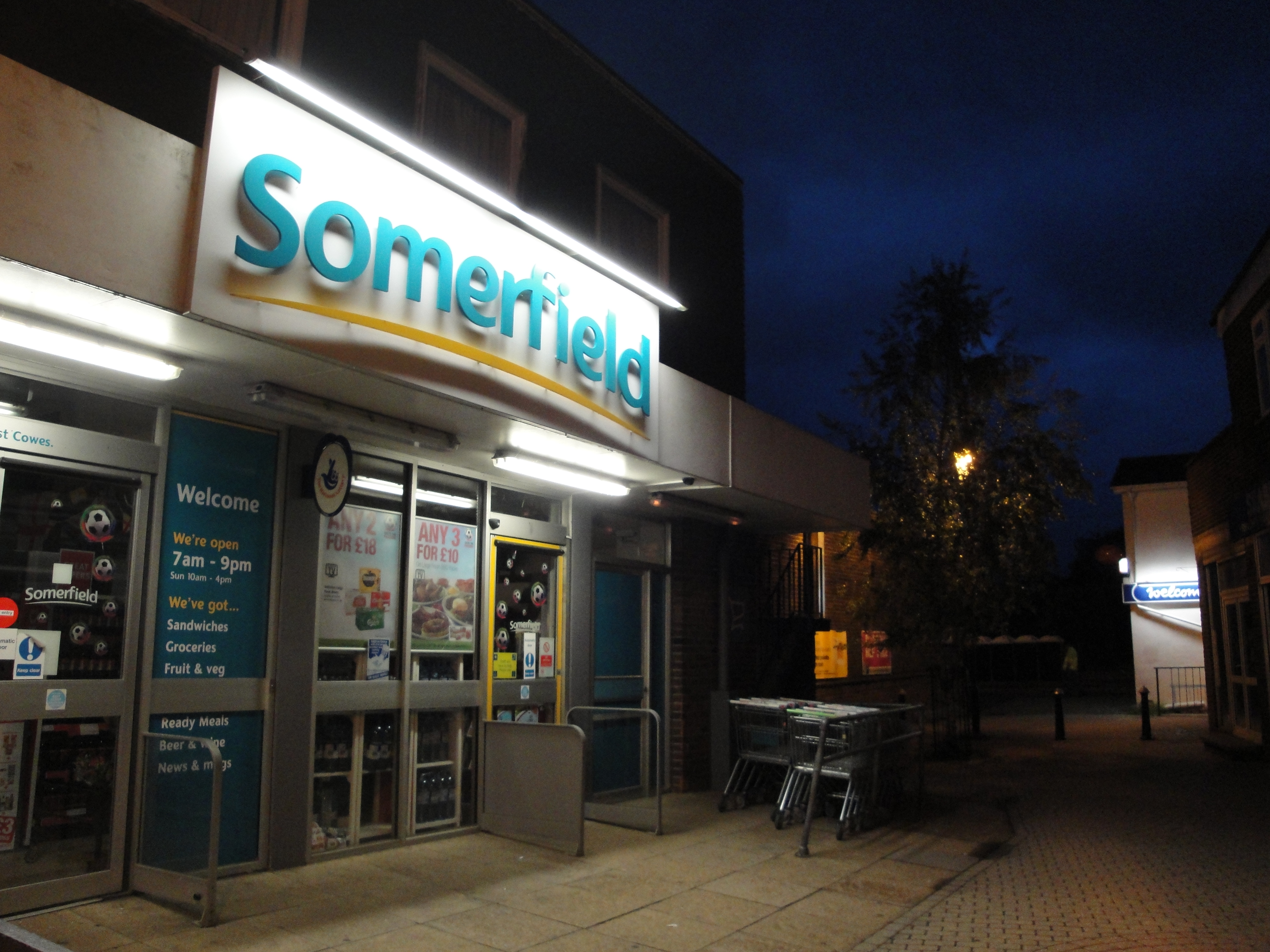
A Somerfield in East Cowes on the Isle of Wight

Somerfield changed its logo in 2002 from a rectangular shape to a more contemporary design and opened several new store formats, including Somerfield Essentials and Somerfield Market Fresh. It further changed its brand image by introducing newer own-brand lines including the premium 'So Good' range, the low fat 'Good Intentions', and a new advertising strapline: "Good Food Made Easy". This strapline later changed several times – see the list of slogans mentioned earlier on this page. A low-price own brand label called 'Makes Sense' was introduced to compete with rival low-cost brands, such as Tesco Value. At some time in the mid-2000s, some stores started selling products labelled under the German-based Tchibo brand, however this ceased by 2009.

=== Safeway Compact ===
In October 2004, Somerfield acquired 114 Safeway Compact stores from Morrisons, which were subsequently re branded under the Somerfield name. This deal was referred to the Competition Commission. After completing its investigation, the commission instructed Somerfield to sell 12 stores. In September 2005, Somerfield announced its intention to appeal against the decision, a process delayed by a takeover bid for the chain. The Competition Appeal Tribunal upheld the commission's decision in February 2006. Somerfield therefore had to proceed with sale of the 12 stores. However, the sale of Kwik Save in February 2006 is likely to have removed the potential clashes between some of the offending stores.

=== Acquired by private equity ===
Retail entrepreneurs John Lovering and Bob Mackenzie made two failed bids to take over the Company in 2003. Then in 2005, Icelandic venture capital group Baugur made an approach, while United Co-operatives and London & Regional Properties also expressed an interest, but both groups dropped out of the running.

Then on 21 December 2005, Somerfield plc was acquired for £1.1 billion by a consortium consisting of Apax Partners, Barclays Capital and the Tchenguiz Family Trust, at which time the name of the group changed to Somerfield Ltd.

The aim of the new owners was to simplify the business and attract new customers. The first move was the end of the Saver Card loyalty scheme in May 2006 with promotional deals becoming available to all customers. A new point of sale was introduced to make promotions and price cuts more visible to customers. Somerfield's three own-label brands were overhauled; the budget 'Makes Sense' range became 'Simply Value', the low calories 'Good Intentions' range became 'Healthy Choice', and the premium 'So Good' range became 'Best Ever!'. A new strapline "Giving you what you want" was introduced to reflect this.

=== Kwik Save sale ===
In 2005, Somerfield closed 22 of its 51 Scottish Kwik Save stores and rebranded the remainder under its own name, thus removing the Kwik Save brand from the marketplace north of the border.

After the group was taken over, it was reported that the new owners found the Kwik Save chain was losing £40m per year, effectively cancelling out around 40% of the profits generated by the Somerfield division. As a result, it increased the rate of converting stores from Kwik Save to Somerfield. On 27 February 2006, Somerfield Stores Ltd sold the Kwik Save brand and 171 stores to BTTF, an investment vehicle headed by Paul Niklas, for an undisclosed sum. Somerfield re-branded the 102 Kwik Save sites it had retained under its own name and a further 77 stores were sold to other retailers, thought to include Netto and Aldi, leaving the company to focus solely on the Somerfield brand.

Subsequent to the initial sale, a further 19 Kwik Save stores were acquired by BTTF, including some of those included in the Competition Commission investigation ruling into the Safeway Compact takeover.

=== Store rationalisation ===
In August 2006, a series of store closures was announced as Somerfield's new owners continued their restructuring activity. Some of these were poorly performing Somerfield stores and some were former Kwik Save sites that had not proved successful after being converted to Somerfield stores in 2006.

Some stores were sold to other groups, including Sainsbury's, which bought five stores, while others were closed completely.

In October 2006, it was revealed that 40 Somerfield stores, including many retained Kwik Save branches, had been sold. These stores were mainly under-performing converted Kwik Save stores.

In November 2006, the company also sold a further 12 stores to Marks & Spencer to trade under the M&S Simply Food brand. This deal included stores in Blackheath in south-east London, Broughty Ferry in Dundee, and Petersfield and Alton in Hampshire.

Having bought 140 Texaco petrol stations in 2007, Somerfield tripled the size of some of their shops, using a similar format to its convenience stores. Signage was replaced with the Somerfield brand.

=== Takeover by the Co-operative Group ===
On 16 July 2008, it was announced that Somerfield would be acquired by the Co-operative Group for £1.57 billion, subject to approval from the Office of Fair Trading.

The build-up to this announcement began in late 2007, when the parent private equity consortium, that had acquired Somerfield in December 2005, put the chain up for sale. News reports valued the chain at over £1.5 billion.

Somerfield appointed Citigroup to manage the sale, and a preference to sell as a going concern rather than on a piecemeal basis was reported. It emerged that four provisional bids were made. Only the Co-operative Group, the UK's largest co-operative, publicly announced purchase talks, aiming to complete due diligence for the entire estate of 900 Somerfield stores in the third quarter, but would be expected to sell a minority of stores. On 24 June, a Thomson Reuters newswire reported sources indicating that the Co-operative Group's acquisition of Somerfield could be finalised at the start of July, in a final deal worth £1.7 billion. Earlier in June, Morrisons confirmed that it was not bidding for Somerfield, but would consider the purchase of any stores that are sold after the acquisition. Newspaper sources said that other major supermarket chains are also interested in such purchases. In July 2008, the Co-operative Group announced a deal to purchase Somerfield for £1.57 billion, creating the fifth largest supermarket chain in the UK. It was confirmed on 20 October 2008 that the Office of Fair Trading had approved the sale of Somerfield under the condition that 126 stores must be sold. This process continued into 2009 with many stores changing ownership, for example to Lidl.

In February 2009, it was announced that The Co-operative Group planned to close the Somerfield head office in Bristol and relocate all operations to its existing head office in Manchester. The Co-operative said that it would try to relocate as many staff as possible to other areas of the business or to its head office in Manchester, to try to avoid redundancies. The takeover was officially completed on 2 March 2009. The conversion and rebranding of Somerfield stores into Co-op stores took just over two years and was completed by summer 2011.

=== Legal case ===
Somerfield entered into a contract with ParkingEye Ltd. for the operation of store car parks, allowing customers a period of free parking and allowing ParkingEye to levy charges and retain payments from customers who overstayed their permitted parking time. The contract was to operate for a minimum of 15 months but was terminated after 6 months, leaving ParkingEye (who had funded the provision of the parking monitoring system) short on revenue due to the curtailed payment period. Somerfield argued that some parts of the ParkingEye process were deceptive, in that in that they stated that customers owed money to ParkingEye when in fact they had breached their agreement on parking duration with Somerfield and their debt lay with Somerfield, and stated that Somerfield would be taking legal action, which was not the case. The supermarket sought to cancel the contract due to its illegality due to deception, but the Court of Appeal ruled in 2012 that the misrepresentations in ParkingEye's process did not justify termination of the contract, noting that earlier action requesting ParkingEye to revise its debt material would have resolved the situation. There was some learning in this case, in that the court stated that the court reinforced long established legal authority for "the justice of treating a party who deliberately sets out to break the law in a serious respect, such as overloading a vessel, differently from a party who breaks the law without meaning to do so or in a way which may be minor".

== Operations ==
As an independent entity, Somerfield was the sixth largest food retailer in the UK, according to TNS Worldpanel, following the sale of the Kwik Save unit and the closure or sale of unprofitable stores, with 977 stores (as of January 2007). Also the fifth largest private company in the UK, Somerfield had a 3.8% share of the UK grocery market in 2007, down from 4.5% in 2006.

The five larger retailers (in descending order of size) were Tesco, Asda, Sainsbury's, Morrisons and The Co-operative Group. The top four have specialities in larger superstores, while the Co-op has become the largest community retailer, with specialities in convenience stores and smaller supermarkets. At one point in early 2007, Somerfield was also briefly surpassed in size by Waitrose.

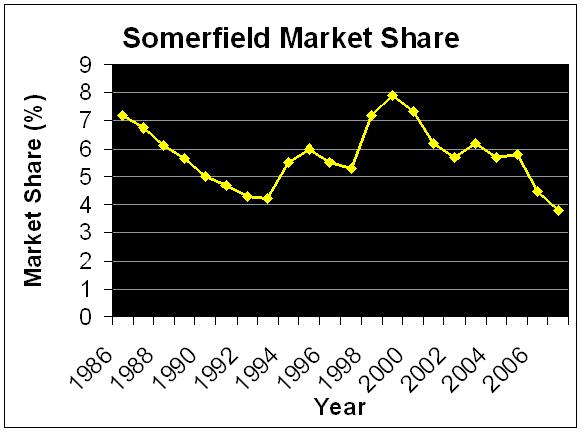
Graph showing market share of Somerfield, including that of Kwik-Save

== See also ==
- List of supermarket chains in the United Kingdom
