= Cartier's Superfoods =

English supermarket chain

Cartier Superfoods
- Industry: Retail
- Founded: 1969
- Founder: Lewis Cartier
- Defunct: 1979
- Fate: Taken over by Tesco
- Successor: Tesco
- Headquarters: Rochester, Kent
- Products: Groceries

Cartiers Superfoods was a Kent-based supermarket chain started by Lewis Cartier in 1969, before the business was purchased by Tesco in 1979 for £19.4 million.

== History ==
The business was started by former butcher boy, Lewis Cartier in 1969 with £50 and a £500 loan from his father, working out of a mobile butchers van. The company, originally called Cartier Freezer Foods, specialised in meat and frozen food, opening stores which were larger than the average supermarket, including the company's flagship in Ashford, Kent in 1976. The company had 17 stores spread across Kent, with a total sales space of 240,000-square-foot (22,000 m^{2}) and at the time had a larger profit margin than rival chains. The value of sales per staff member at Cartier's was £52,042 compared to rivals Sainsbury's which was £35,627, Tesco at £30,900; while Carrefour, Asda, and Morrisons and Safeway achieving sales per employee of between £ 36,000 and £ 41,000. The business was floated on the London Stock Exchange in 1977 with a price of 33p, and was oversubscribed 105 times. At the time, the business had plans to open a further 8 stores and had a turnover of £30 million.

Tesco offered £19.4 million for the business, a 16p increase of the then share price in July 1978. Tesco did not have a big presence in Kent, and Leslie Porter, Chairman of Tesco stating that

the price was worth paying because Cartier's sites, its under-lying assets, would cost even more if bought individually. The way people tender these days, you are talking about £25m to £30m

Stores were located in, among other places, Canterbury, Folkestone, Faversham, Herne Bay, Strood, Sittingbourne and Cliftonville.

Various TV commercials were produced by Southern Television at their Dover studios, and on location at Cartiers Ashford superstore.
