= Jempson's =

Supermarket chain in South east England

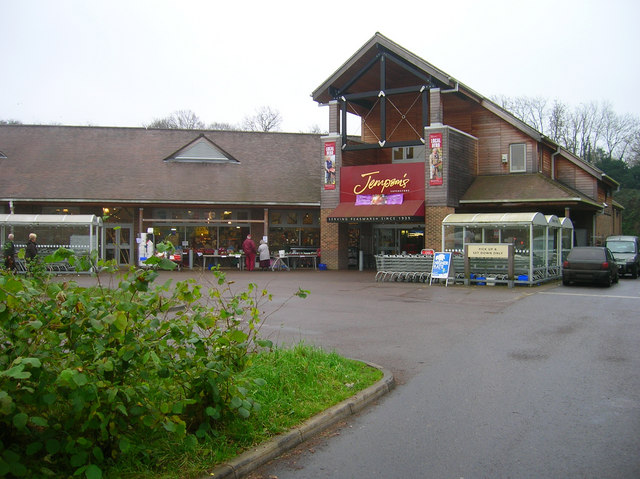
- Jempson's supermarket in Peasmarsh
- Founded: 1935; 91 years ago in Peasmarsh, East Sussex, England
- Website: jempsons.com

Jempson's is a family-owned chain of supermarkets, bakeries, and cafes in south east England.

The company has its own charitable trust, the Jempson Foundation.

== History ==
The company began operation in Peasmarsh in 1935.

Beatle Paul McCartney and family regularly patronised the store in the 1980's.

In 2017, the company merged most of its baking with The Rye Bakery, a wholesale bakery firm with three branches.

In 2020, in response to the COVID-19 pandemic, the company introduced a home delivery service for its groceries. In 2021, the company introduced its own refigerated ready meals.

In 2021, the company acquired a convenience store in Bexhill-on-Sea from Co-op Food. It reopened as Jempson's on 1 July 2021.

In May 2023, Jempson’s re-launched as part of the ‘Together with Morrison’s’ brand, a model designed for independent store owners with established local brands and larger stores.

In 2023 Jempsons purchased a store in Chailey from McColls. The store underwent minor refurbishment and rebranding.

== Bus service ==
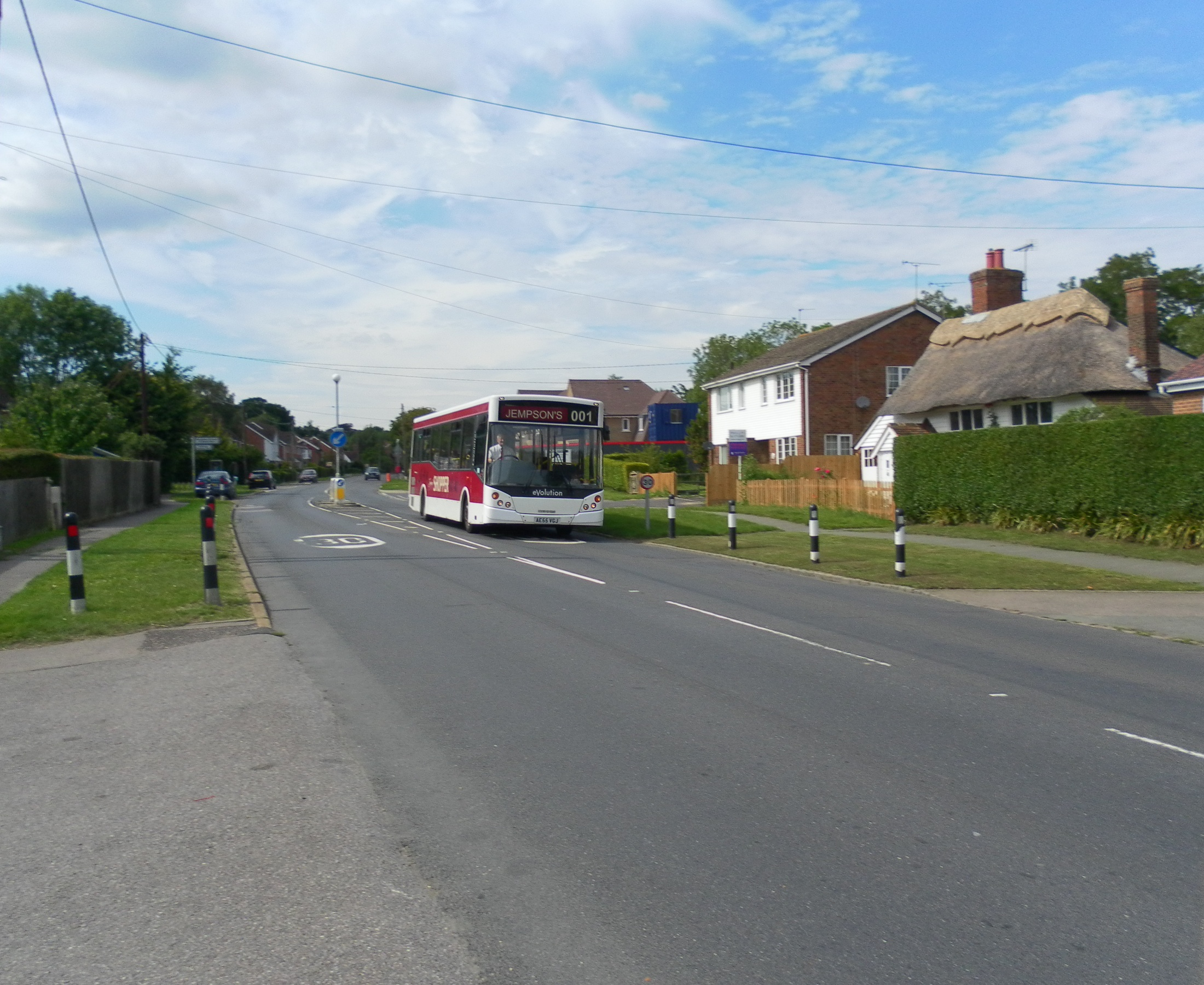
The Jempson's bus

The company formerly ran a free bus service consisting of various infrequent routes connecting its supermarket in Peasmarsh to surrounding towns and villages. Most recently, it was operated by an MCV Evolution with a Dennis Dart body, manufactured in 2006. The services were withdrawn on 17 March 2018 due to low usage.

== Health and Safety Incident ==
A woman was hit by a delivery lorry in January 2013 while walking in the car park at Jempson's supermarket in Peasmarsh. She sustained serious injuries that resulted in one of her legs being amputated. In July 2015, the company was fined £130,000 as it was found to have broken the Health and Safety at Work etc. Act 1974.
