= Shoprite (Isle of Man) =

Former Manx and Scottish supermarket chain

Shoprite (Isle of Man) Limited
- Shoprite logo (2008–2024)
- Type: Supermarket
- Industry: Retail (Grocery)
- Founded: 1972
- Defunct: 29 June 2024
- Fate: Acquired and absorbed into Tesco
- Headquarters: Little Switzerland, Douglas, Isle of Man
- Area served: Isle of Man; Scotland
- Key people: Ken Murphy (Tesco CEO)
- Products: Groceries, consumer goods
- Owner: Tesco
- Number of employees: 600+
- Website: manxshoprite.com

Shoprite (Isle of Man) Limited (trading as Shoprite) was a supermarket chain in the Isle of Man. It was a wholly owned subsidiary of Isle of Man Enterprises plc (formerly Shoprite Group plc), until Tesco announced its purchase of the business on 9 October 2023.

== History ==
Shoprite was established in the Isle of Man in 1972. At the start of the 1990s, it was solely a retail and property group. In 1990, it purchased a former distribution warehouse from Safeway in Cambuslang near Glasgow. The company announced that it would trial running a discount limited range supermarket, opening two pilot stores in November 1990. The stores were located in Linwood and Bridge of Allan, and were styled like the English discount chain Kwik Save with basic racking and no frills offers. The business continued to grow, mainly across Scotland's central belt, with 63 stores operating by October 1993. In June 1994 the company opened its first stores in the North of England, and by October 1994 it operated 108 stores. The stores were generally converted from former car showroom and ex DIY stores, and varied between 4,000 and 13,000 square feet in size.

The Head office was moved to Scotland in 1992 with aid of a Scottish Office Industry Department grant. Funding for this rapid growth was funded by sales of sideline businesses in the Isle of Man, a share issue in the stock exchange and a leaseback deal on several stores. It was estimated that Shoprite had captured 10% of the grocery market in Scotland. In May 1994, Shoprite had to release its unaudited interim results as there were rumours of poor trading performance. The results showed that sales were up 59% but profits were down, which saw the share price fall from 242p to 50p. By July, Shoprite announced a further profits warning, which resulted in its share price falling to 30p and banks suspending its borrowing rights. In October, another profit warning was released, and in November it was announced that Kwik Save had agreed to buy Shoprite's 117 Scottish and English stores for £45.7 million, with Shoprite retreating back to the Isle of Man. Shoprite's chairman, Deryck Nicholson, whose family owned 50% of the shareholding, was son of one of the founders of Kwik Save.

== Former business ==
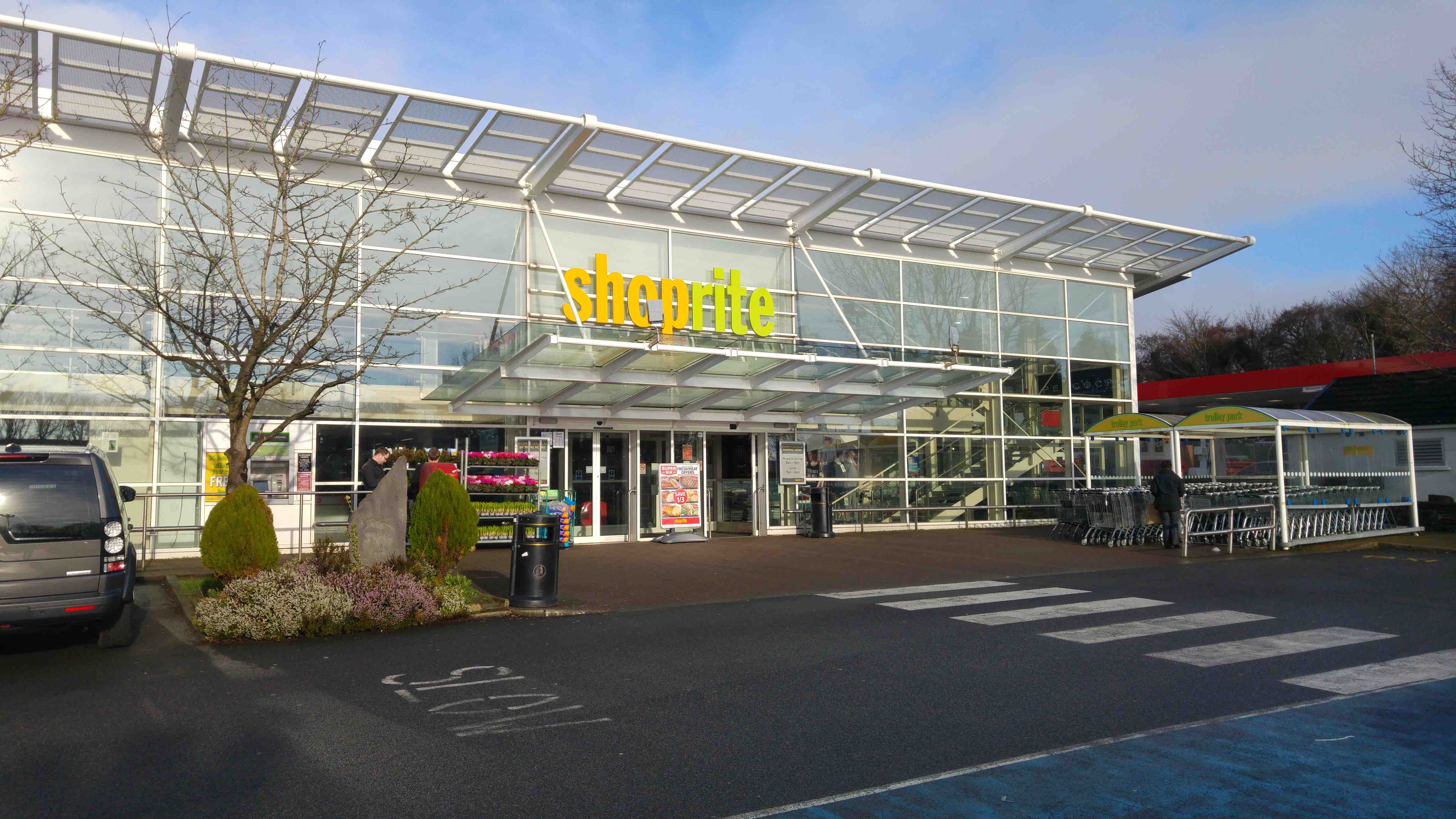
Former Shoprite, Douglas, Little Switzerland

Shoprite owned 9 supermarkets in the major communities on the Isle of Man. These stores were branded Shoprite, Little Shoprite and Winerite. The Shoprite stores were located in Douglas, Peel, Ramsey, Port Erin, and Onchan. The Little Shoprite stores were in Castletown, Peel and Ramsey. There was also a Wine warehouse in Douglas trading as Winerite Extra. The community food stores in Port Erin and Peel had a Subway café.

Shoprite Douglas was the first store in the Isle of Man to install a bar-code scanning system at its tills and the Shoprite group was the first supermarket chain in the British Isles to install bar-code scanning systems in all its stores in the early 1980s.

It had trading relationships with brands and partners such as Sainsbury's, and previously Waitrose and Iceland (UK discount supermarket chain), Subway, Cook (UK frozen ready meal supplier), Peacocks (UK "value" fashion retailer), and LloydsPharmacy (UK pharmacy chain).

In 2020, it announced a new long-term strategic partnership with Sainsbury's supermarkets, the 2nd largest UK retailer, to sell Sainsburys products in Shoprite stores.

In 2023, Tesco acquired all nine Shoprite shops on the Isle of Man. It was announced that stores would be rebranded under the Tesco name, increasing its store count in the Isle of Man from one to ten.

In February 2024, Tesco announced that it would close Shoprite's Subway cafes, meaning that Subway would leave the Isle of Man. Subway came back to the Isle of Man in 2025 at a SPAR store in Ramsey.

The final stores to close were Peel (Derby Road) and Winerite in Douglas which shut in June 2024. The remaining supermarkets were due to be converted to Tesco format.

By December 2024, all Shoprite stores (except the Douglas Winerite) had reopened as Tesco shops.
