= International Tea Co. Stores =

Chain of grocers based in London

- Type: Public
- Industry: Retail
- Founded: 1878
- Defunct: 1994
- Fate: Acquired
- Successor: Somerfield
- Headquarters: London, England
- Products: Groceries

International Tea Co. Stores was a leading chain of grocers based in London. It was an original constituent of the FT 30 index of leading companies listed on the London Stock Exchange.

== History ==
The business was founded in 1878 by Hudson Kearley (later Viscount Devonport) and Gilbert Augustus Tonge as the International Tea Co., with the objective of selling tea direct to consumers rather than through wholesalers. International's main blenders were Ridgways, which became part of the group with the acquisition of Star Supply Stores in 1929.

Soon, most towns in Southern England had their own International Tea Co. store, as immortalised in a verse from John Betjeman's poem Myfanwy:

Smooth down the Avenue glitters the bicycle,
Black-stockinged legs under navy blue serge,
Home and Colonial, Star, International,
Balancing bicycle leant on the verge.

International Tea Co. Stores fell out of the FT 30 index in 1947 to reflect market developments since the index was originally compiled in 1935.

=== Re-branding and demise ===
The company was subsequently re-branded International Stores and was acquired by BAT Industries in 1972. In 1973, the Price Rite chain was purchased, adding stores to the International brand. This was further increased by the purchase of Wallis Supermarkets in 1977, which added a further 100 stores. After acquiring the large footprint Mac Food Centres from Unilever's closure of Mac Fisheries, in 1979, the chain created a new brand, Mainstop, to develop the new superstore division in 1980. However, BAT decided to sell any business that failed to progress and so the company was sold off in chunks. Former Price Rite stores in the south of England were sold off in 1980 to Fine Fare, with the remaining 67 branches sold to Argyll Foods in 1982.

In 1984, International Stores was sold to the Dee Corporation. The company became the Gateway Corporation in 1988 and then Somerfield Stores in 1994.
