= Jutrzenka (company) =

Patisserie company, 1946, Bydgoszcz, Poland

Coordinates: 53°08′38″N 17°54′17″E

Colian Holding sp. z.o.o. – Bydgoszcz factory
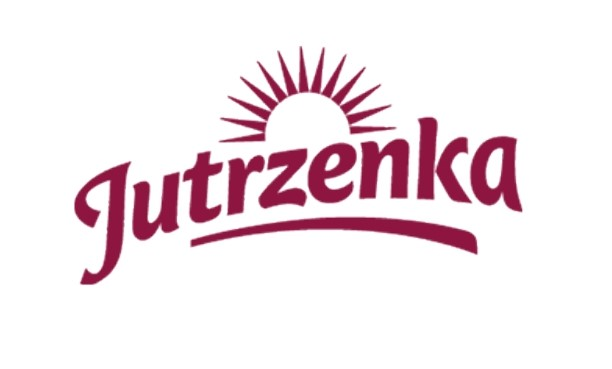
- Jutrzenka

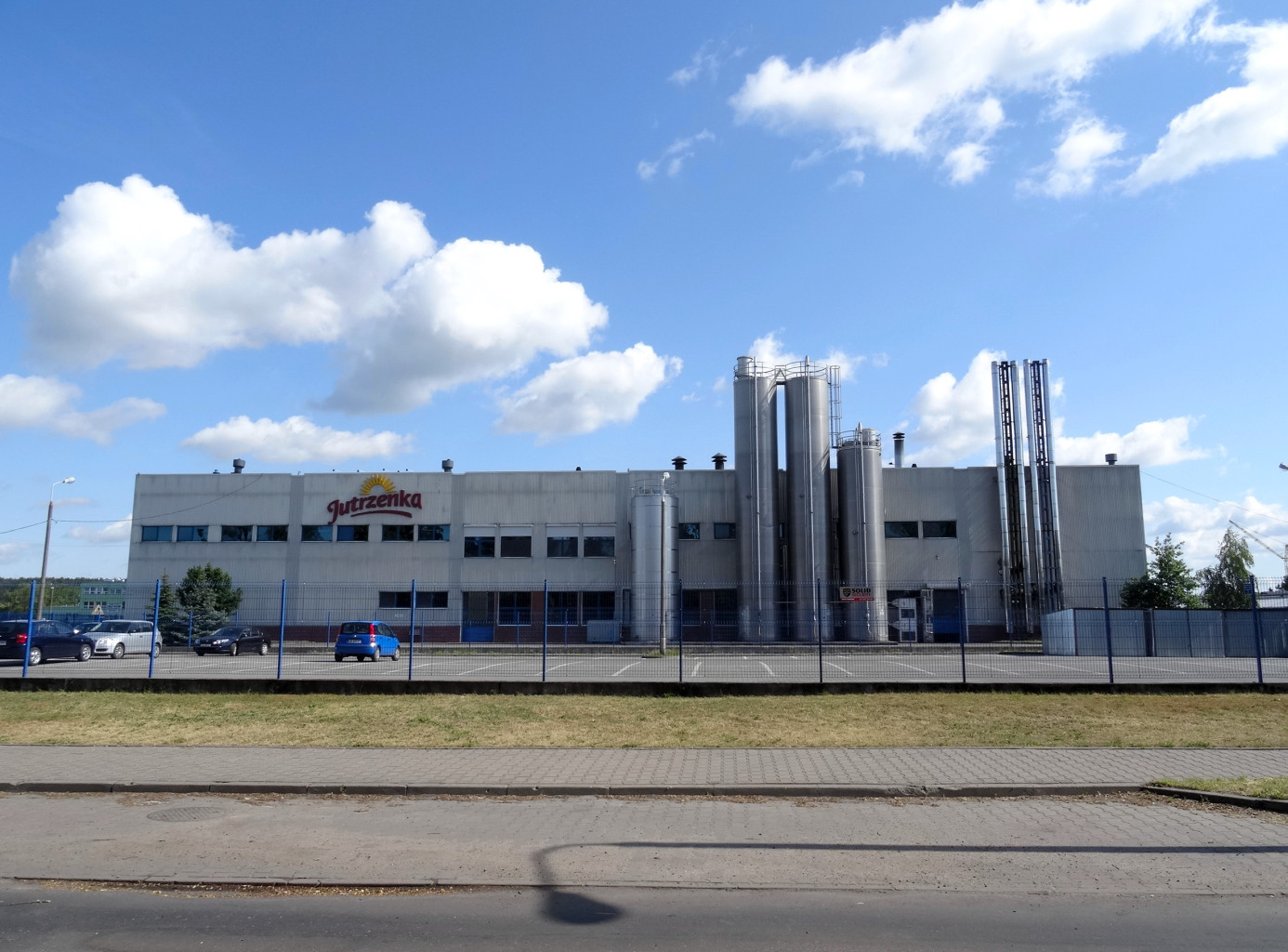
- Factory in Osowa Góra
- Company type: Firm
- Industry: Pâtisserie
- Predecessor: Lucullus (Franz Lehmann)
- Founded: 1951 in Bydgoszcz, Poland
- Founder: Polish People's Republic
- Headquarters: Bydgoszcz then Opatówek, Poland
- Area served: Poland
- Products: Pastries, sweets
- Owner: Colian Group
- Number of employees: 370
- Website: colian.com

Jutrzenka is a food industry enterprise, set up in 1951 in Bydgoszcz from the aggregation of nationalized companies dating from the pre-war period. It has been listed since 16 May 1995 on the Warsaw Stock Exchange. In 2008, the remaining production plant was transformed into a corporate group, Jutrzenka Holding S.A.. The latter has been incorporated in 2014 into the Colian Holding, seated in Opatówek in the Greater Poland Voivodeship.

Additionally, the Jutrzenka brand, owned by Colian Group, offers an array of sweet and confectionary products.

== History ==
=== Before 1945 ===
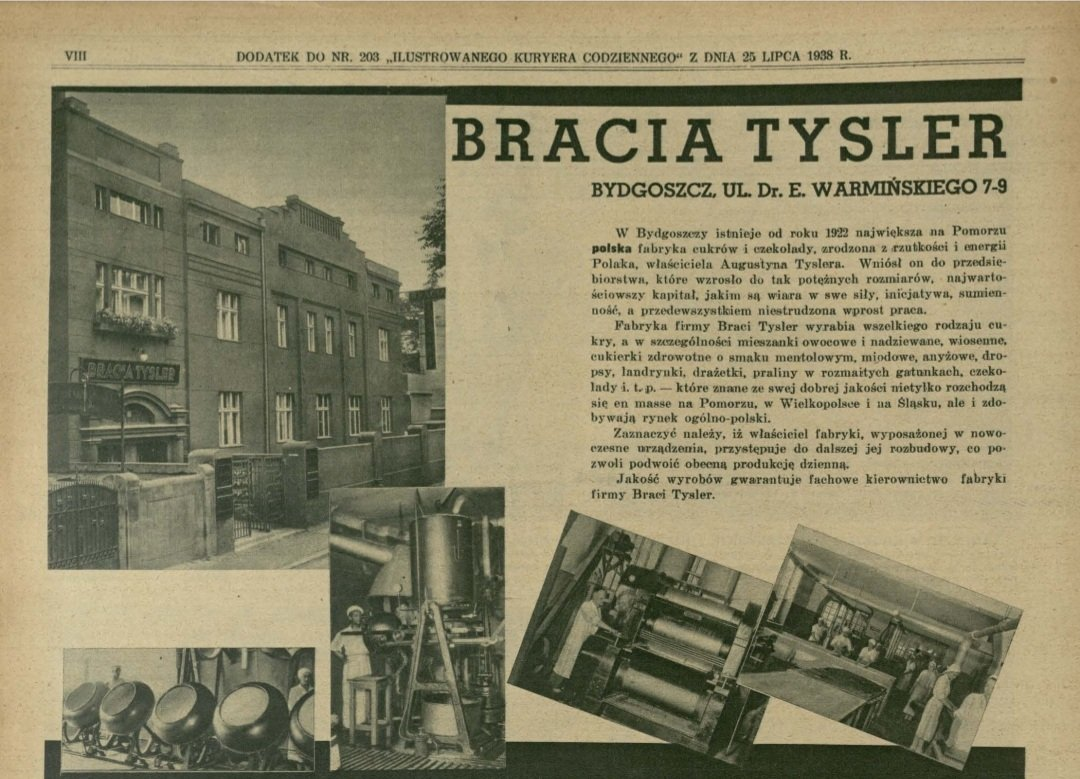
Advertising for Bracia Tysler factory, 1938

The company's origins have several roots:

- the Factory of Sugar Products and Marmalades "Kama" (Polish: Fabryka Wyrobów Cukrowych i Marmolady „Kama"), which activity started in 1907 in present-day Zduny street;
- the Sugar, Chocolate and Cocoa Factory "Lukullus" (Polish: Fabryka Cukrów, Czekolady i Kakao „Lukullus"), established in 1920 by Franz Lehmann, at today's 16 Poznańska street and 5 Garbary Street. Just before the outbreak of the Second World War, "Lukullus" employed 600 people.
- the Tysler Brothers Confectionery Factory (Polish: Fabryka Wyrobów Cukierniczych Braci Tysler) set up in 1922 at 9 Warmińskiego street.

During the occupation, the three plants operated under German supervision, sending part of their production to the Wehrmacht. Before the end of the conflict, part of the machines and devices were exported to Germany, while products and raw materials were destroyed.

=== PRL Period (1946–1989) ===
In April 1945, the Soviet military authorities entered "Lukullus" Confectionery Factory on the register of facilities in Bydgoszcz to be dismantled and moved to the USSR.

The transfer was avoided in May 1945, after the intervention of the Polish authorities towards USSR economic representatives of the Mission in Warsaw. Be that as it may, the same year, the main confectionery factories of Bydgoszcz became nationalized:

- the former "Tysler Brothers Confectionery Factory" at Warmińskiego street was renamed Fabryka Wyrobów Cukierniczych "Jutrzenka" (Confectionery Factory "Jutrzenka"), producing caramels, dragées and chocolate candies;

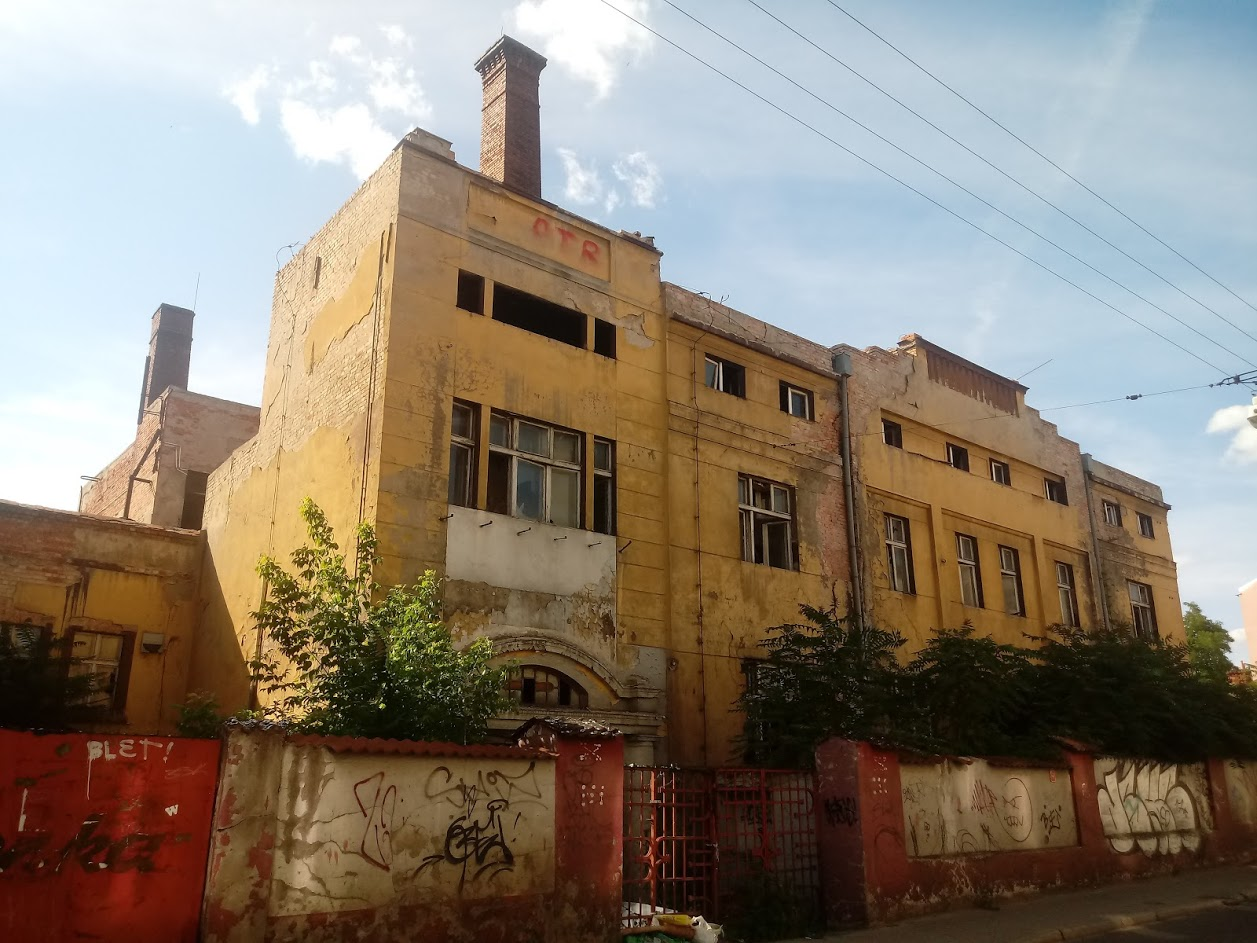
Former plant Nr 2 at Warmińskiego Street

- in 1949, the plants at Warmińskiego and Poznańska (ex-"Lukullus") streets merged into one entity called Pomorskie Zjednoczone Fabryki Cukrów i Czekolady (Pomeranian United Sugar and Chocolate Factory);
- in 1950, two plants were added to the group, the former "Lukullus" warehouses at 5 Garbary street and a factory at 53 Kościuszki street previously producing hardtacks for the army.

In 1951, the company was renamed Zakład Przemysłu Cukierniczego „Jutrzenka" w Bydgoszczy (Bydgoszcz Confectionery Industry Plant "Jutrzenka") and expanded with new production lines. In 1954, the company employed 640 people, including 480 women. Between 1956 and 1966, the production increased more than twofold. The offer was enriched with chocolate accessories and biscuits.

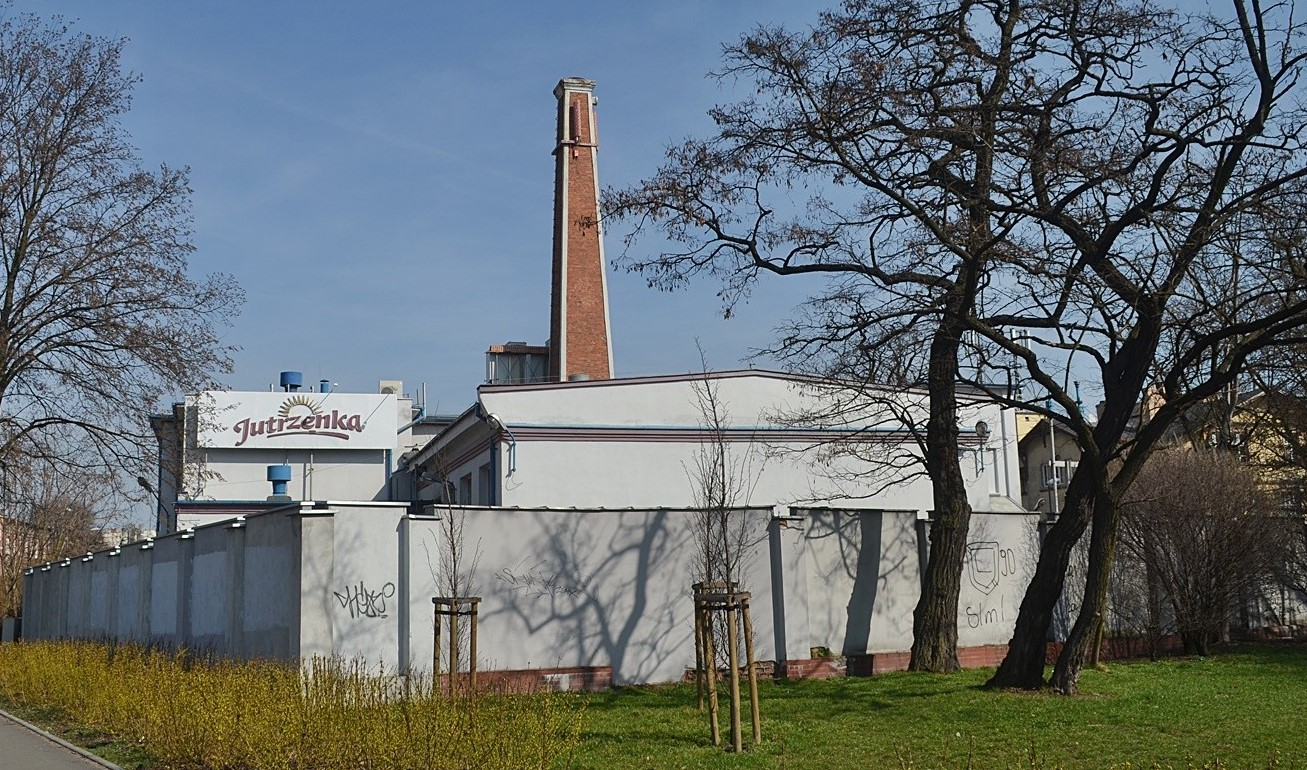
Former plant Nr 3 at Garbary Street

In the 1960s, the ensemble consisted of three production departments: bakery, milk fondants, dragées and chocolate accessories. Auxiliary workshops were also separated (mechanics, carpentry, electrics). At that time, some of the factory edifices were old dated (built between 1928 and 1943) and warehouses were too small for the needs.

The communist economic system under the Polish People's Republic implied a constant shortage of imported raw materials like cocoa beans, peanuts, coconuts, raisins or coffee beans. The necessary use of substitute raw materials and modified production recipes made the quality of the products not specifically high: however, the production was always easily sold to pressurized customers in the then prevailing shortage economy. The rare exports were realized only on the basis of specific orders.

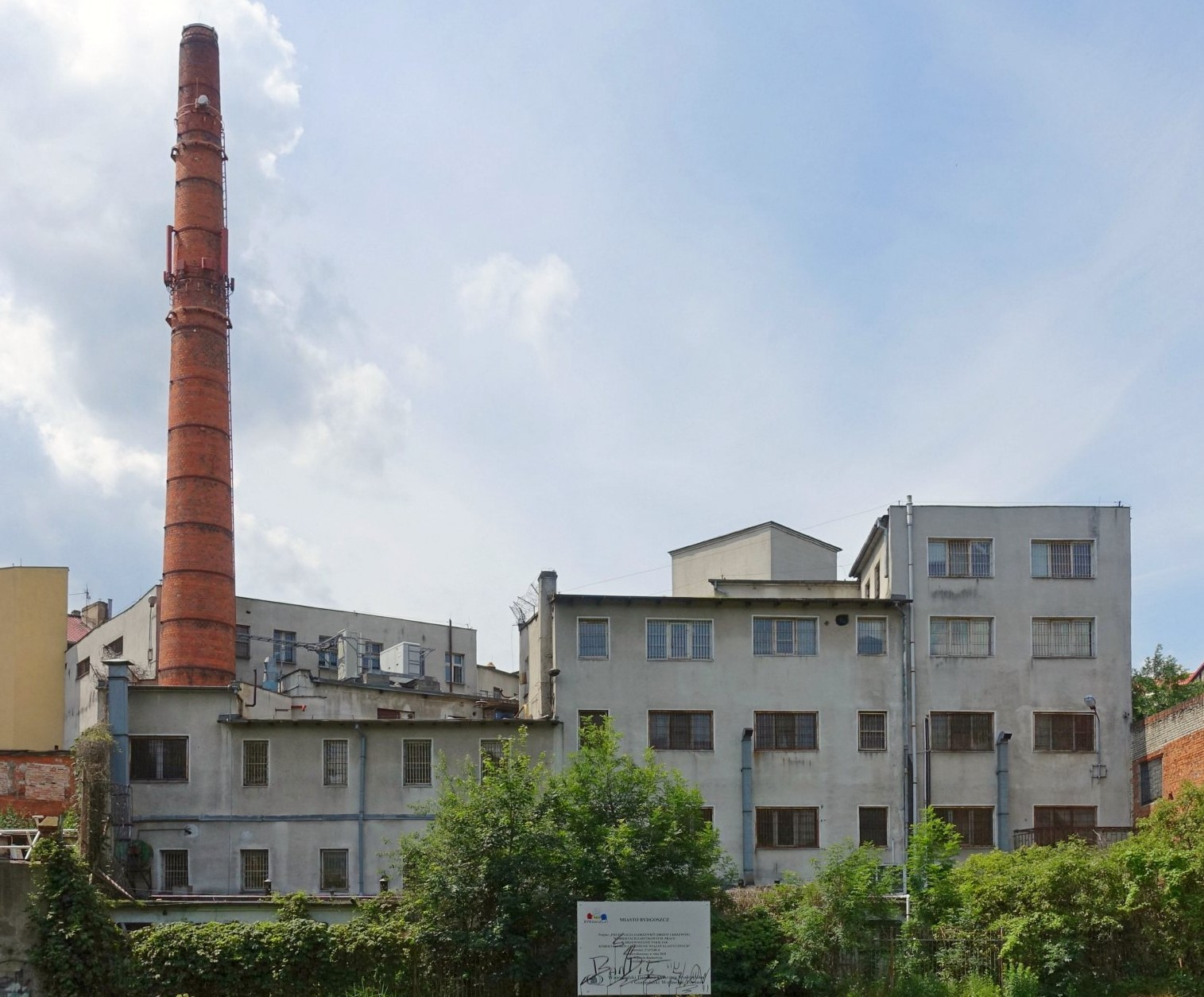
Former plant Nr 4 at Świętej Trójcy Street

In 1966–1967, new mergings occurred, as the Fabryka Cukiernicza „Kopernik" (Confectionery Factory "Kopernik"), a Toruń-based producer of gingerbreads and wafers, together with other local food facilities were added to the group. This new combine was rebranded Pomorskie Zakłady Przemysłu Cukierniczego (Pomeranian Confectionery Industry Plant). It was one of the largest in Poland:

- 150 types of products were part of the combine offer (1969), including marshmallows and chocolate-coated jellies;
- 5% of the production was exported;
- 60% to 80% of the personnel was female.

In 1982, the combine broke into "Jutrzenka" and Toruń's "Kopernik". "Jutrzenka", as an independent entity, became Przedsiębiorstwo Przemysłu Cukierniczego "Jutrzenka" (Confectionery Industry Enterprise "Jutrzenka"). It was still one of the 10 largest producers of confectionery products in Poland, concentrating 5% of the domestic production. Part of the production was exported to the USSR, East Germany, West Germany, United States, Canada and the Arab countries.

At the end of the 1980s, "Jutrzenka" had 5 production plants in Bydgoszcz:

- Nr 1 at 53 Kościuszki street;
- Nr 2 at 7/9 Warminskiego street;
- Nr 3 at 5 Garbary street;
- Nr 4 at 2 Świętej Trójcy Street;
- Nr 5 at 22 Srebrna street.

=== Recent period (since 1989) ===
Following the fall of the communist economic market, the firm was converted on 13 February 1993 into a Joint-stock company named Przedsiębiorstwo Cukiernicze "Jutrzenka" S.A. (Confectionery company Jutrzenka SA), which ownership was divided among 624 employees of the enterprise. This privatization turned to be a successful story. The activity has been increasing steadily every year, with a commercial offer extended to domestic and foreign markets.

As a matter of facts, exports to Western Europe, the United States, Canada and the countries of the former Soviet bloc doubled. Much of the income has been regularly re-invested. In the 1990s, the workforce increased to 1,100 people. On 15 May 1995, "Jutrzenka SA" debuted on the Warsaw Stock Exchange. In that period, advertising was developed by means of radio and television and sponsoring investment was realized. From 1993 to 1998, "Jutrzenka" provided financial support to the speedway club Polonia Bydgoszcz, which won several times the Polish Championship.

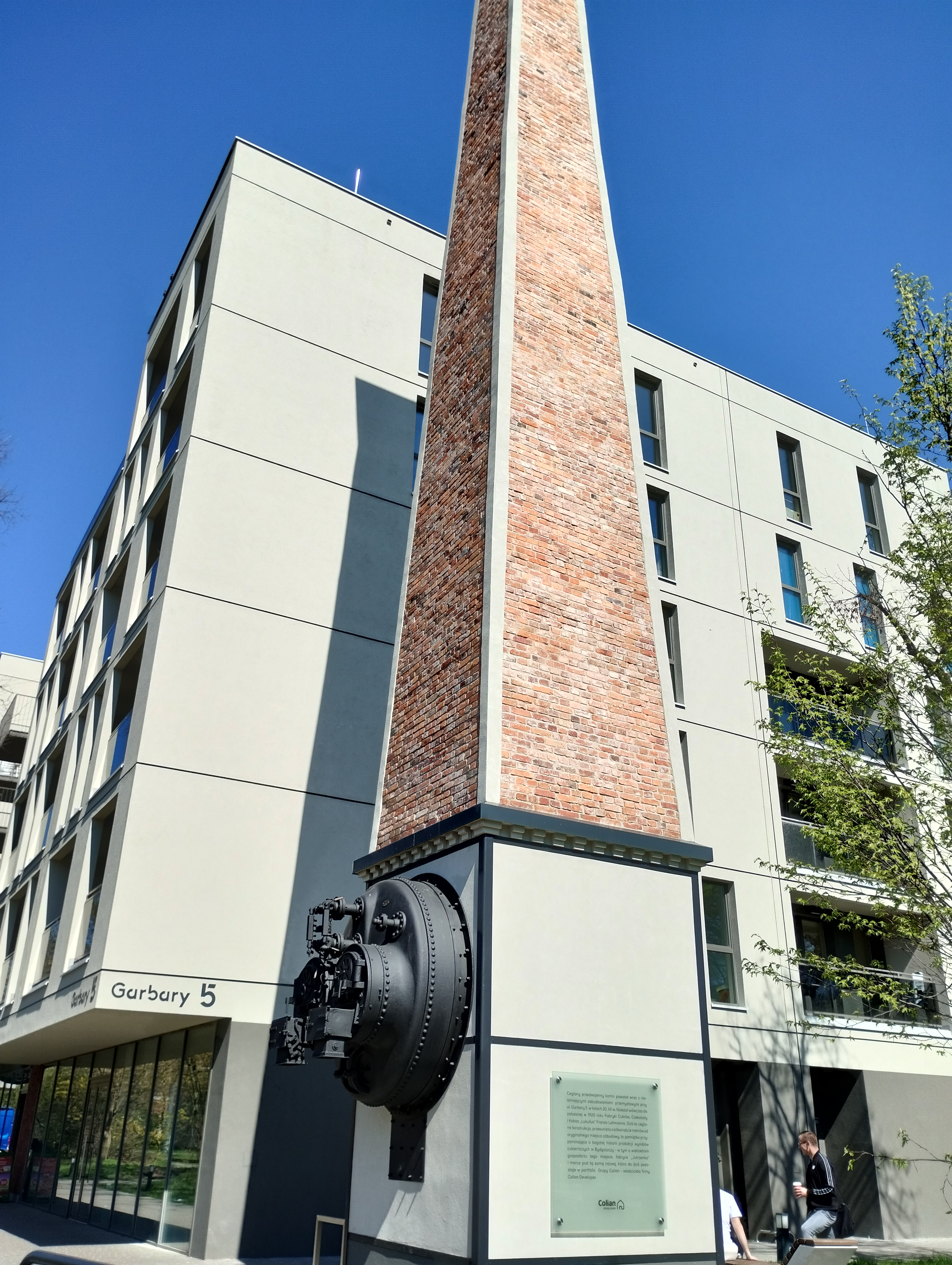
Housing estate on the plot of the former plant Nr 3, at 5 Garbary Street

In 2001, Jan Kolański, founder-owner (1990) of the firm Ziołopex, in Piątek Wielki entered "Jutrzenka"'s supervisory board. Three years later, he became its main shareholder and president. The following years, "Jutrzenka SA" realized several acquisitions:

- in 2004, Polish brand "Goplana" (and its Poznań plant) from Nestlé conglomerate;
- in 2005, Polish confectionery company "Kaliszanka", owner of domestic well-known brands such as "Grześki" (wafers) or "BeBe" (biscuits);
- in 2007, Polish beverage firm "Hellena", with its factory in Opatówek.

In 2008, a consolidation of the activities of the group Jutrzenka Holding S.A. took place: the seat was moved from Bydgoszcz to Opatówek. The holding company, which focused on confectionery, culinary and beverage markets, then owned the following commercial brands: "Jutrzenka", "Jeżyki", "Familijne", "Akuku!", "Mella", "Goplana", "Grześki", "Appetita", "Hellena" and "Siesta".

In 2011, the holding name was changed to Colian S.A. with two subsidiaries, "Jutrzenka Colian sp. z.o.o." and "Colian Logistic sp. z.o.o.". In 2013, the group took over the confectionery company "Solidarność" from Lublin. A year later, it changed its name to Colian Holding S.A. with the following subsidiaries: "Colian sp. z.o.o." and "Colian Logistic sp. z.o.o.".

On 19 September 2014 a brand new plant was unveiled in Bydgoszcz in the district of Osowa Góra, where the production, previously performed in various smaller plants in the city, was consolidated. The PLN 60 million building costs received a large support (PLN 23 million) of the "Operational Program Innovative Economy 2007–2013". At its opening, the factory employed 370 people and produced 40 tons of sweets a day.

In the second half of the 2010s, new acquisitions happened:

- in 2016, British luxury chocolate supplier "Elizabeth Shaw";
- in 2018, Irish company "Lily O’Brien’s".

== Bydgoszcz production sites ==
- Former plant Nr 1, at 53 Kościuszki street: its activity has been transferred to site Nr 5. It is now the seat of "Colian Logistic".

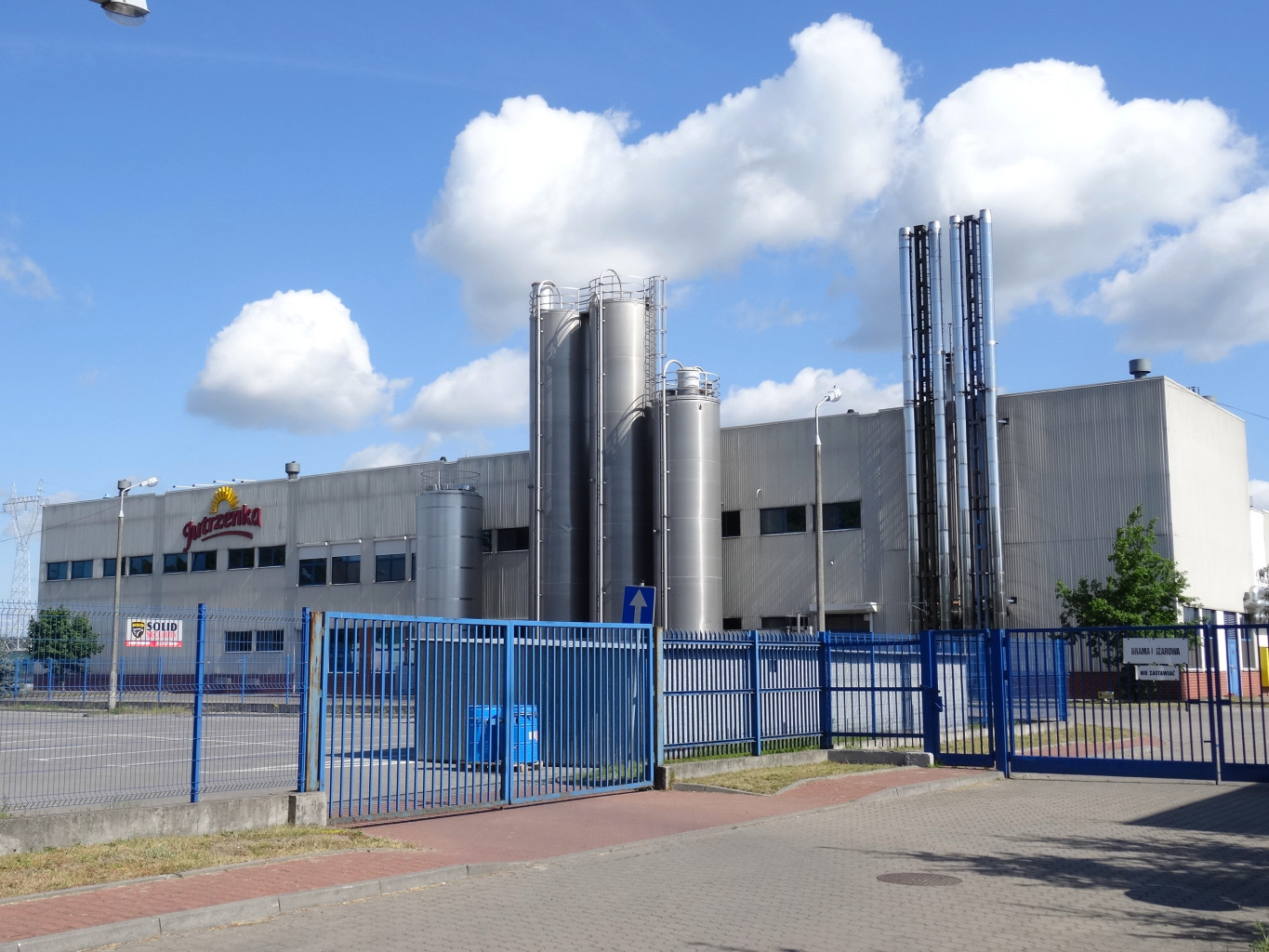
2014 Factory in Osowa Góra district

- Former plant Nr 2, at 7/9 Warmińskiego street. The abandoned factory lies in ruins. In 2019, "GM Architekci" declared its intent to reconstruct and extend the historic production building into a multihabitation project.
- Former plant Nr 3, at 5 Garbary Street. The plot has been converted in 2020 into a housing estate, by "Colian Developer", a subsidiary of the confectionery holding. The massive factory chimney has been dismantled and reconstructed closer to the street, in remembrance of the previous activity of the site.
- Former plant Nr 4, at 2 Świętej Trójcy Street: it was the historic headquarters of the pre-war "Lukullus" company. The activity quickly moved to plant Nr 1. Today, the site houses the clothing firm "Modus", producing uniforms for the police, the military, fire departments and other services.
- Operating site Nr 5, at 22 Srebrna street, Osowa Góra district.

== Products ==
Today, "Jutrzenka" main products are:

- “Familijne” wafers;
- “Petit Beurre” and “Be Be” biscuits;
- “Elitki” butter biscuits;
- “Miśki” and “Akuku!” gummies;
- Almonds in chocolate.

Furthermore, the Bydgoszcz factory manufactures sweets for other brands of the Colian group, such as “"Grześki" wafers, “Jeżyki” (chocolate coated biscuits), “Alibi” chocolate bar or "Chopin” chocolate.

Jutrzenka products are sold to the domestic market and also exported to more than 30 countries in Europe, Asia, North America and in the Middle East.

In 2020, on the occasion of the 25th anniversary of the creation of the "Familijne" (Family Wafers), Corian Holding Group commissioned a mural to be realized at 51 Jagiellońska Street. The work called Familijne has been designed by Karol Banach. It is a part of an ensemble of more than 20 pieces scattered within Bydgoszcz.

== Parent corporate group ==
The plant is part of "Colian Holding S.A.", a Polish-funded leading company of the confectionery market.

Colian's line of products includes, apart from "Jutrzenka", the following commercial brands of sweets:

- "Grześki" and "Akuku!" produced in Bydgoszcz;
- "Goplana" chocolates produced in Poznań;
- "Solidarność" produced in Lublin;
- "Hellena" drinks and "Appetita and Siesta" delicacies.

In 2023, the group cash flow reached about PLN 1 billion and its workforce amounted to more than 2,500 people. Its factories are located in Bydgoszcz, Kalisz, Lublin, Opatówek, Poznań and Wykroty.

== Gallery ==
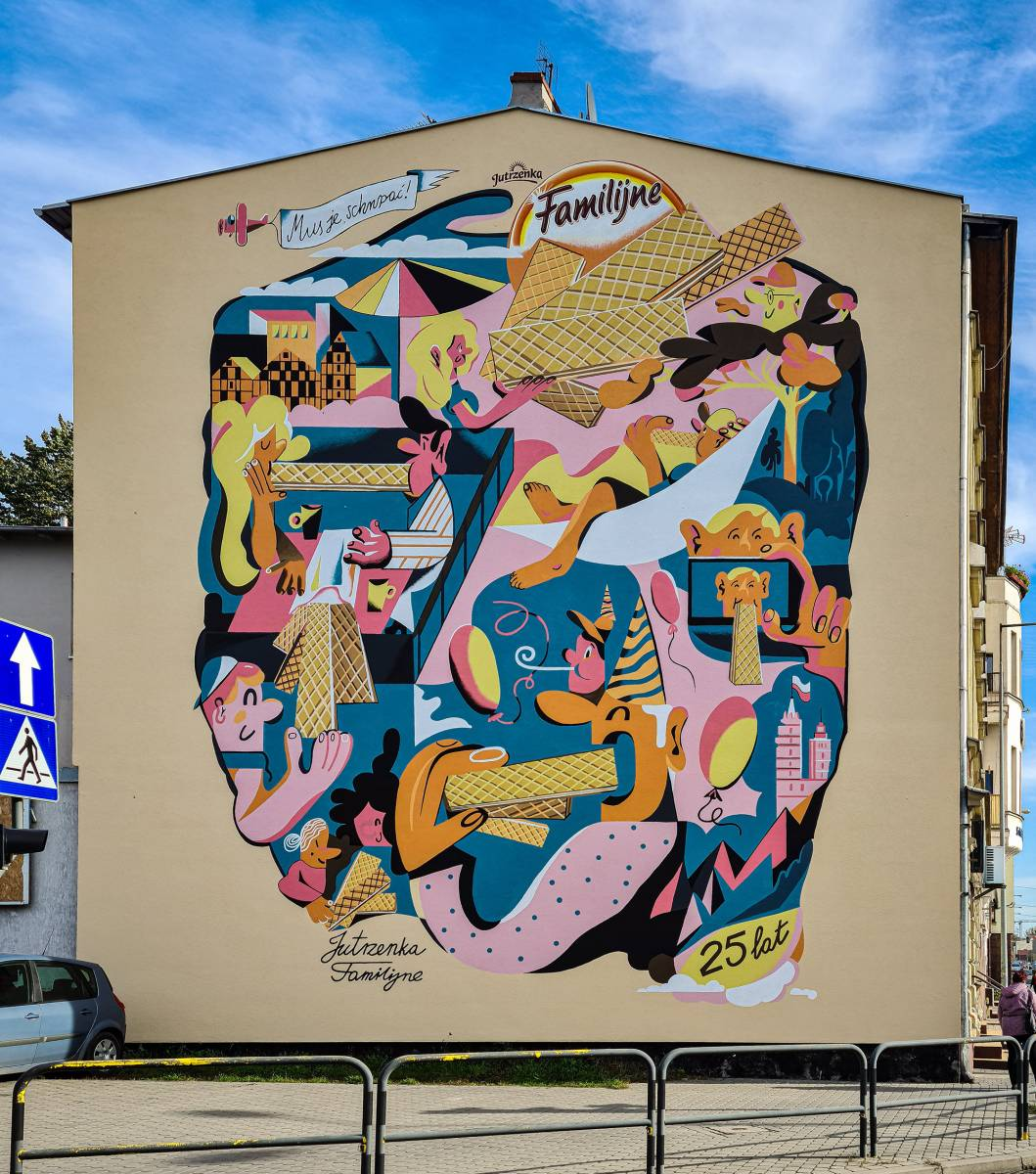
Mural "Jutrzenka" at 51 Jagiellońska Street

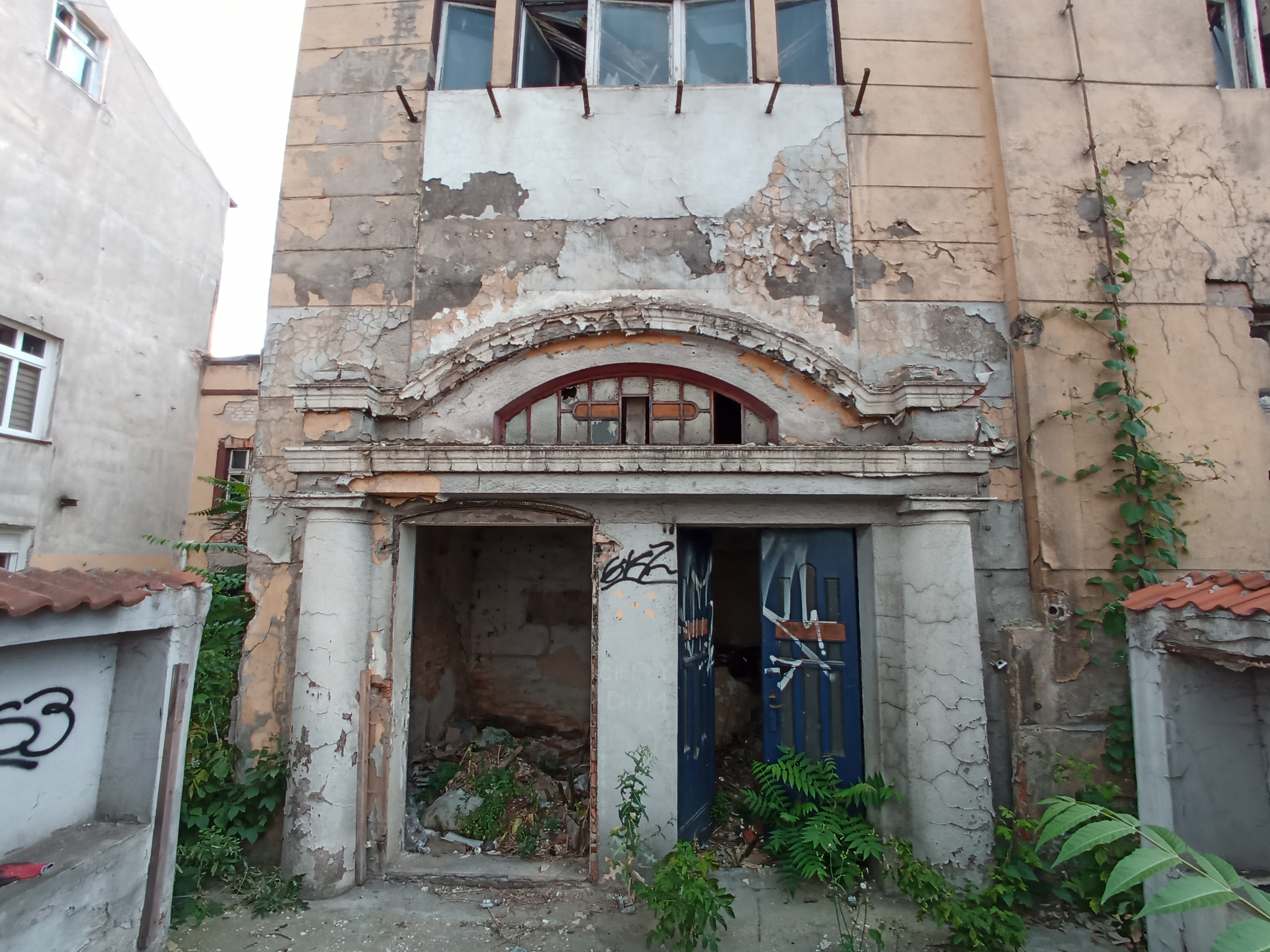
Portal of the former plant Nr 2 at Warminskiego street

== See also ==
- Bydgoszcz
- Colian Holding
- Elizabeth Shaw chocolates
- Pâtisserie

== Bibliography ==
- Długosz, Jerzy (1994). "Jutrzenka" -słodka uwodzicielka. Kalendarz Bydgoski ["Jutrzenka" – a sweet seductress. Bydgoszcz Calendar] (in Polish). Bydgoszcz: Towarzystwo Miłośników Miasta Bydgoszczy. pp. 81–86.
