= Skulski =

Skulski is a Polish and Jewish surname. It may refer to:

- Jarosław Skulski (1907–1977), Russian-born Polish film and theatre actor
- Leopold Skulski (1878–1940), prime minister of Poland for six months from 13 December 1919 until 9 June 1920

== See also ==
- Skulsk, a village in Konin County, Greater Poland Voivodeship, in west-central Poland
- Skulskie Lake, a lake in Gmina Skulsk, Konin County, Greater Poland Voivodeship, north-central Poland, near the village of Skulsk
