= Goplana =

Goplana may refer to:

- Goplana (confectionery), a confectionery factory in Poznań, Poland
- Goplana (fungus), a genus of rust fungi
- Goplana (opera), an 1896 opera by Władysław Żeleński
- Goplana, Konin County, Poland
- Goplana, a fictional being in the 1839 play Balladyna by Juliusz Słowacki
- Villa Goplana, home of Rajmund Jarosz in Truskavets (Truskawiec), now Ukraine

== See also ==
- Gopło, a lake in Kuyavia, Poland
- Goplania Inowrocław, men's football team in Inowrocław
