= Starostwo, Greater Poland Voivodeship =

Starostwo
- Settlement
- Location within Poland
- Coordinates: 52°28′24″N 18°19′52″E
- Country: Poland
- Voivodeship: Greater Poland
- County: Konin
- Gmina: Skulsk

Starostwo [staˈrɔstfɔ] is a settlement, a part of Lisewo-Parcele colony, in the administrative district of Gmina Skulsk, within Konin County, Greater Poland Voivodeship, in west-central Poland.
