= Skulsk Lake =

Lake in Poland

- Location within Greater Poland Voivodeship
- Location: Gmina Skulsk, Greater Poland Voivodeship
- Coordinates: 52°28′26″N 18°19′14″E
- Basin countries: Poland
- Max. length: 0.56 km (0.35 mi)
- Max. width: 0.8 km (0.50 mi)
- Surface area: 1.27 km^{2} (0.49 sq mi)
- Average depth: 6.7 m (22 ft)
- Max. depth: 17.6 m (58 ft)
- Settlements: Skulsk

Skulsk Lake (Polish: Jezioro Skulskie) is a lake in Gmina Skulsk, Konin County, Greater Poland Voivodeship, north-central Poland, near the village of Skulsk.
