= Czartowo =

Czartowo may refer to the following places:

- Czartowo, Greater Poland Voivodeship (west-central Poland)
- Czartowo, Lubusz Voivodeship (west Poland)
- Czartowo, West Pomeranian Voivodeship (north-west Poland)
