= Koszewo =

Koszewo may refer to the following places:

- Koszewo, Greater Poland Voivodeship (west-central Poland)
- Koszewo, Podlaskie Voivodeship (north-east Poland)
- Koszewo, West Pomeranian Voivodeship (north-west Poland)
