= Piastowo =

Piastowo may refer to the following places:

- Piastowo, Greater Poland Voivodeship (west-central Poland)
- Piastowo, Kuyavian-Pomeranian Voivodeship (north-central Poland)
- Piastowo, Subcarpathian Voivodeship (south-east Poland)
- Piastowo, Lubusz Voivodeship (west Poland)
- Piastowo, Warmian-Masurian Voivodeship (north Poland)
- Piastowo, Przasnysz County (north Poland)
