= Przyłubie, Greater Poland Voivodeship =

Przyłubie
- Village
- Location within Poland
- Coordinates: 52°27′15″N 18°20′37″E
- Country: Poland
- Voivodeship: Greater Poland
- County: Konin
- Gmina: Skulsk

Przyłubie [pʂɨˈwubjɛ] is a village in the administrative district of Gmina Skulsk, within Konin County, Greater Poland Voivodeship, in west-central Poland.
