= Czartówek =

- Village
- Location within Poland
- Coordinates: 52°27′03″N 18°18′44″E
- Country: Poland
- Voivodeship: Greater Poland
- County: Konin
- Gmina: Skulsk

Czartówek [t͡ʂarˈtuvɛk] is a village in the administrative district of Gmina Skulsk, within Konin County, Greater Poland Voivodeship, in west-central Poland.
