= Nói Síríus =

Icelandic chocolate manufacturer

- Company type: Privately held company
- Industry: Confectionery production
- Founded: 1920
- Founders: Eiríkur Bech, Gísli Guðmundsson, Loftur Guðmundsson, Þorgils Ingvarsson and Hallur Þorleifsson
- Headquarters: Reykjavík, Iceland
- Area served: Iceland; Scandinavia
- Key people: Lasse Ruud-Hansen (managing director)
- Products: Chocolates
- Revenue: ▲ISK 4.15 billion (2022); ISK 3.72 billion (2021)
- Operating income: ▼ISK 157 million (2022); ISK 173 million (2021)
- Net income: ▼ISK 15.1 million (2022); ISK 61.8 million (2021)
- Number of employees: 130
- Parent: Orkla ASA
- Website: noi.is

Nói Síríus (Icelandic pronunciation: [ˈnouːɪ ˈsiːriːʏs]) is an Icelandic chocolate and confection manufacturer founded in 1920. The company is a wholly owned subsidiary of the Norwegian Orkla conglomerate. Hallgrímur Benediktsson took over as main owner in the 1920s, and his grandson, Finnur Geirsson, was the company's president up until late 2021 when Lasse Ruud-Hansen took over after Orkla had Bought the rest of the shares in early 2021. Nói Síríus is Iceland's biggest candy producer and its candies have been a traditional part of camping trips since 1933, along with stockfish.

The company produces Tópas and Opal, "fresh breath products" known for being somewhat bitter and soothing a sore throat with menthol and eucalyptus, as well as pastilles, sugar twists, assorted chocolates (a Christmas tradition) and Easter eggs. The chocolates come in dark and milk chocolate varieties as well as bars with nuts and raisins, whole hazelnuts, raisins and liquorice chips. The company also produces a "Little Imps" lines for children that includes "candy covered chocolate drops, hot and spicy pepper drops, fruity jellies with a candy shell or colourful little gum drops".

Nói Síríus candies are sold domestically in Iceland and exported, primarily to Russia and the United States. Smaller quantities are shipped to Denmark and the Netherlands under the Oxydent and Fakta brands.

Nói Síríus has also been publicly accused of using artwork created by independent artists for their opal packaging without permission.

== International expansion ==
In the late 1990s the company purchased a stake in Laima, Latvia's largest candy manufacturer, but sold it in 2004. In March 2006 the company bought English chocolate company, Elizabeth Shaw, but sold it in May 2009 and focused on its own brands.

== Acquisition by Orkla ==
In August 2019, Orkla acquired a 20% minority stake in Nói Siríus. In May 2021, the Norwegian conglomerate completed the acquisition of an additional 80% ownership share in the company, securing full ownership approval from the Icelandic Competition Authority, thereby increasing their stake in the company to 100%.

== Candy culture ==
Chocolate is a mainstay of Icelandic culture. Nói Síríus produces 300,000 chocolate Easter eggs in a nation of 340,000 people. The Easter eggs are made at the company's Reykjavík plant, and a note with a saying is put into each egg. Icelandic liqueurs bearing the Tópas and Opal name have also been introduced, achieving some acclaim, with filmmaker Quentin Tarantino's description of them as "the worst drink on earth" after an evening imbibing them.

The company also made news in 2007 for a controversial marketing campaign and promotion stunt that had people join a Labor Day demonstration with signs labeled with Nói-Síríus-produced Tópas candy while shouting advertising slogans.
