= Lisewo, Konin County =

Lisewo
- Village
- Location within Poland
- Coordinates: 52°27′32″N 18°20′13″E
- Country: Poland
- Voivodeship: Greater Poland
- County: Konin
- Gmina: Skulsk
- Population: 370

Lisewo [liˈsɛvɔ] is a village in the administrative district of Gmina Skulsk, within Konin County, Greater Poland Voivodeship, in west-central Poland.
