= Zygmuntowo, Gmina Skulsk =

Zygmuntowo
- Village
- Location within Poland
- Coordinates: 52°27′54″N 18°21′47″E
- Country: Poland
- Voivodeship: Greater Poland
- County: Konin
- Gmina: Skulsk

Zygmuntowo [zɨɡmunˈtɔvɔ] is a village in the administrative district of Gmina Skulsk, within Konin County, Greater Poland Voivodeship, in west-central Poland.
