= Elizabeth Shaw (confectionery company) =

Confectionery company in Bristol, United Kingdom

Coordinates: 51°28′1″N 2°33′16.2″W

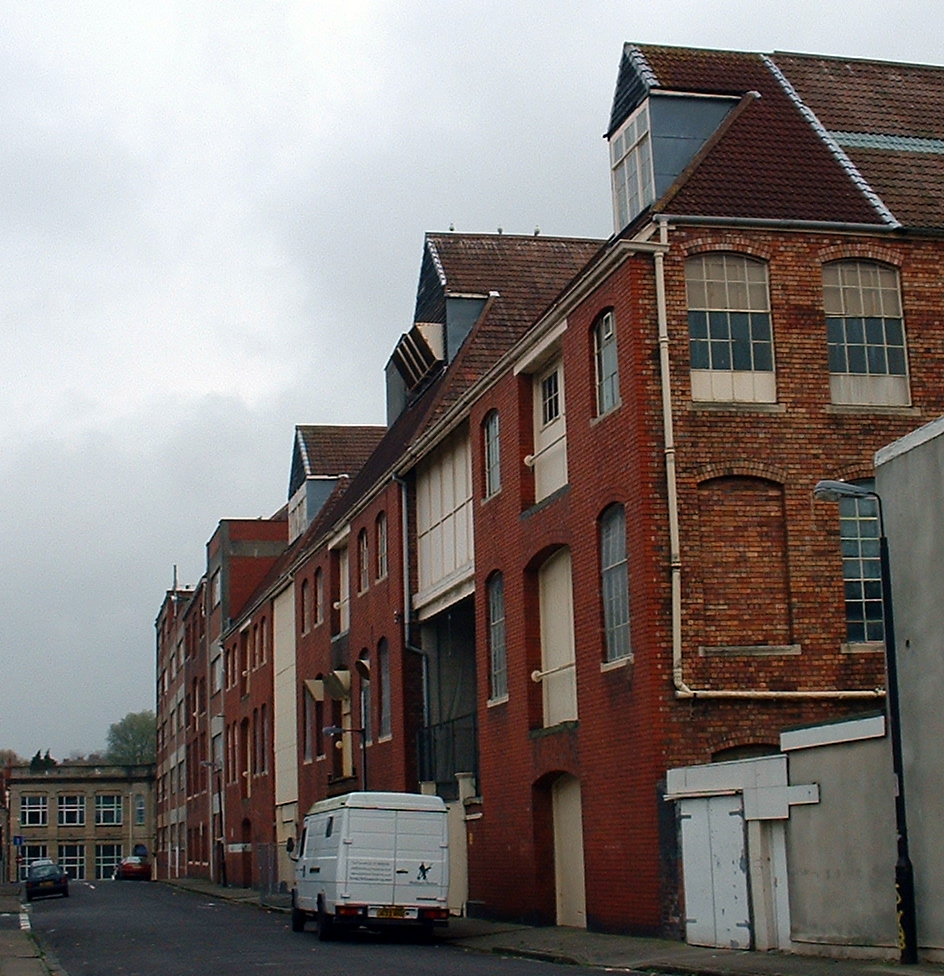
- The Elizabeth Shaw chocolate factory on Co-operation Road
- Type: Private
- Industry: Confectionery
- Founded: 1810 (Ewbanks)
- Headquarters: Bristol, United Kingdom
- Key people: James Goldsmith, (chairman)
- Products: Famous Brands & Elizabeth Shaw
- Parent: Colian Holding

Elizabeth Shaw Ltd is a Bristol-based company owned by Colian Holding that markets chocolate-based confectionery, including the brands Famous Names liqueur chocolates and Elizabeth Shaw Mint chocolates. The modern company was formed from several mergers of well established confectionery companies, first by J A & P Holland and then by James Goldsmith in the 1960s as part of his creation of his food conglomerate Cavenham Foods.

== History of Ewbanks ==
In 1810, the business was founded by Thomas Firth as Firth Confectioners and was Pontefract's second liquorice factory, making Pontefract cakes. The business changed hands first to David Longstaffe, before coming under the partnership of Robert Ewbank and W. F. Horsell. The company moved to the larger Eagle Liquorice Works in 1887, but the partnership broke up in 1892 leaving Ewbanks solely in charge. The company became incorporated in 1912. The factory was damaged by incendiary bombs during World War II, with a replacement being opened in 1948. The business was purchased by Hollands of Southport in January 1961 for £72,600. The Eagle Liquorice Works were closed in 1965 after becoming part of Cavenham Confectionery.

== History of S. Parkinson & Sons ==
Doncaster's famous product was butterscotch, which is reputedly invented by Parkinsons in 1848. The company was founded by Samuel Parkinson, a grocer located on the High Street in Doncaster. The company first moved production to Station Road in 1905. The company advertised the butterscotch as Royal Doncaster Butterscotch or the Queen's Sweetmeat. The company was purchased from the Parkinson family by Samuel Balmforth in 1892, before the business was incorporated in 1912 and moved to new premises in Wheatley. At the time the company produced baking powder in addition to its liquorice products. By 1956 the company employed over 500 people and had expanded their range to Parkinsons Boiled Sweets. In 1961 the company was purchased by Hollands of Southport.

== History of Yeatman & Co ==
Israel Edward Woolf established Yeatman & Co from 119 New Bond Street, Stepney in 1857 selling Yeast powder, later opening a factory in Denmark Street and by 1884 they had diversified into Baking Powders; different flours; Callsayme Bitters; Lime-juice Cordial; Custard Powder; Egg Powders; Curry Powder; Flavouring Essences; Disinfecting Powder and Insect Powder. In 1899, Nursing Record & Hospital World stated that Yeatman's ginger marmalade and coffee extract tasted more of coffee than rivals' products. In 1898 the company was incorporated and had added further products to its range including soups, jams, jellies and sweets. Yeatman's Delicious Jelly Tablets were exported to Australasia, and the company produced the first sweets for Marks & Spencer. Their factories in Stepney were destroyed by fire during the Blitz, and with government assistance, Yeatman's opened a new factory in Watford, where they made a more restricted line of canned and bottled fruit, fruit squashes, sweets (under the Goodies and Selesta brands), and their best-remembered product, Sunny Spread. The business was sold to James Goldsmith's newly acquired business Carsons Ltd in 1964, and subsequently integrated into his Cavenham Foods business, with production being transferred and the factory being sold to Goldsmith's former company, Mothercare.

== History of H J Packer & Carsons ==
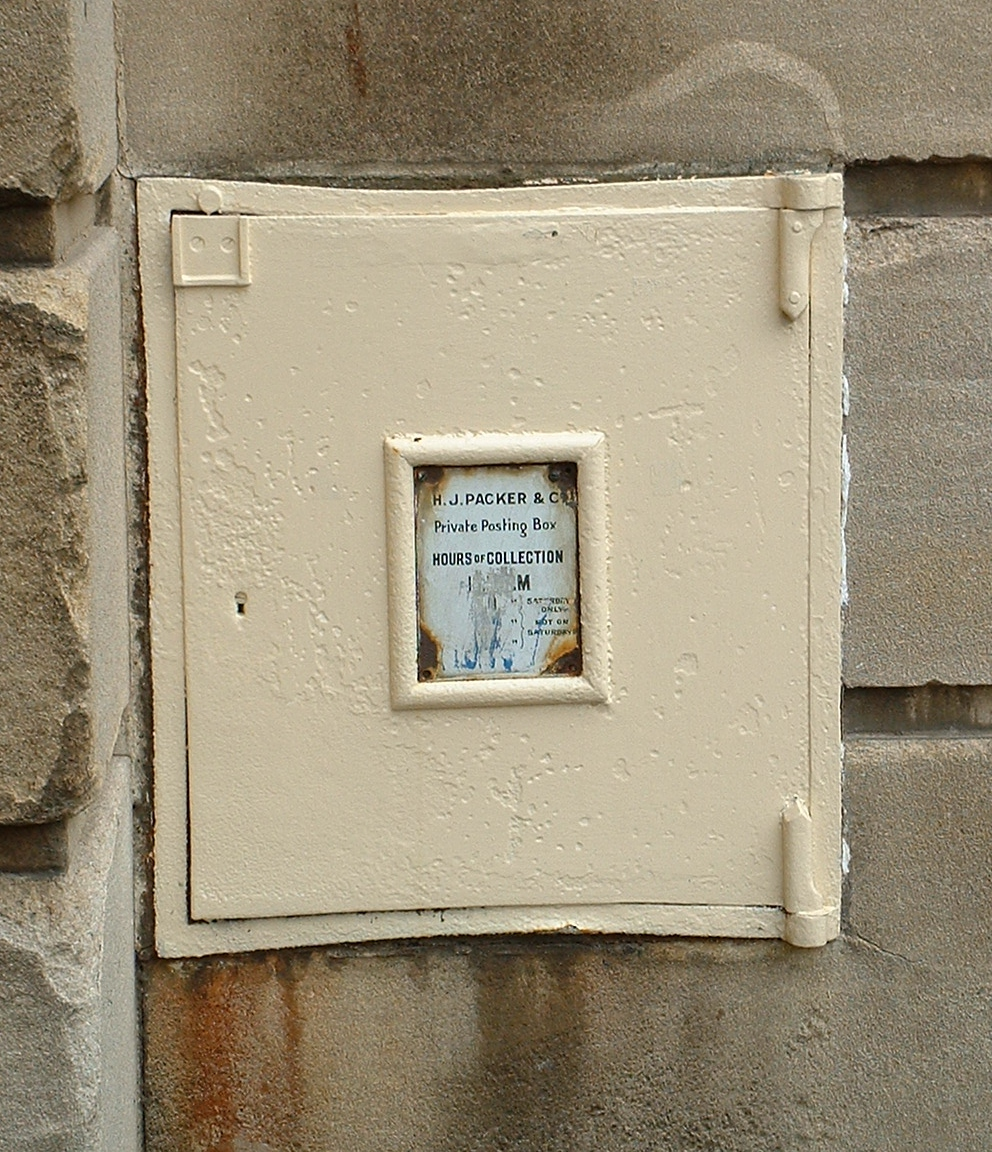
H J Packer postbox at Greenbank

The business was founded in 1881 by Edward Packer, in Armoury Square, Bristol. Packer was joined by his sister and brother. In 1884, the family took on, H. J. Burrows, thus becoming H. J. Packer & Co but a year later the partnership was dissolved, and Burrows became the sole owner of the business. However, within a year Burrows had sold the business for £950 to Caleb Bruce Cole.

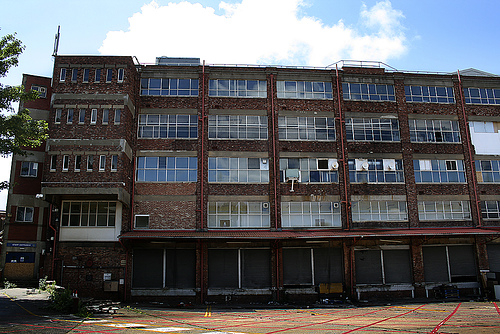
The Greenbank factory

The business sales increased greatly from 1894; so in 1901, the company moved to a new purposefully designed factory in Greenbank. The move coincided with continued growth and between 1903 and 1912, sales had grown by 250%, helped by Two ounces per penny quality chocolates aimed at children and popular lines like Packers Chocolate Mixers. In 1908 the company expanded by buying Glasgow-based high-end chocolate manufacturer Carsons, as well as the creation of the new brand Bonds of Bristol to sell luxury chocolate products made at Greenbank. Carsons Glasgow factory was closed, and production was moved to a new factory in Shortwood, near Mangotsfield, Gloucestershire. The company by the early 1920s was Britain's 4th largest chocolate manufacturer and employed over 2000 employees, introducing new lines like Milk Crispets. Carsons Chocolate was taken by Sir Ernest Shackleton and his team on their expeditions.

However the company's fortunes declined by the start of World War II, and by 1955 the company relaunched the Packers brand, bringing out new products including Summit chocolate bars and penny sweets like White Mice and Sweet cigarettes. By 1961, Carsons' production was moved to Greenbank. Carsons was the biggest British manufacturer of chocolate liqueurs sold under the Famous Brands name, and in 1962 H J Packer was renamed under Carsons Ltd. However the company was still not profitable and by 1963 it lost £39,000.

The company fell prey of James Goldsmith, and became one of the founding businesses of his conglomerate Cavenham Foods in 1964.

== History of Walters Palm Toffee ==
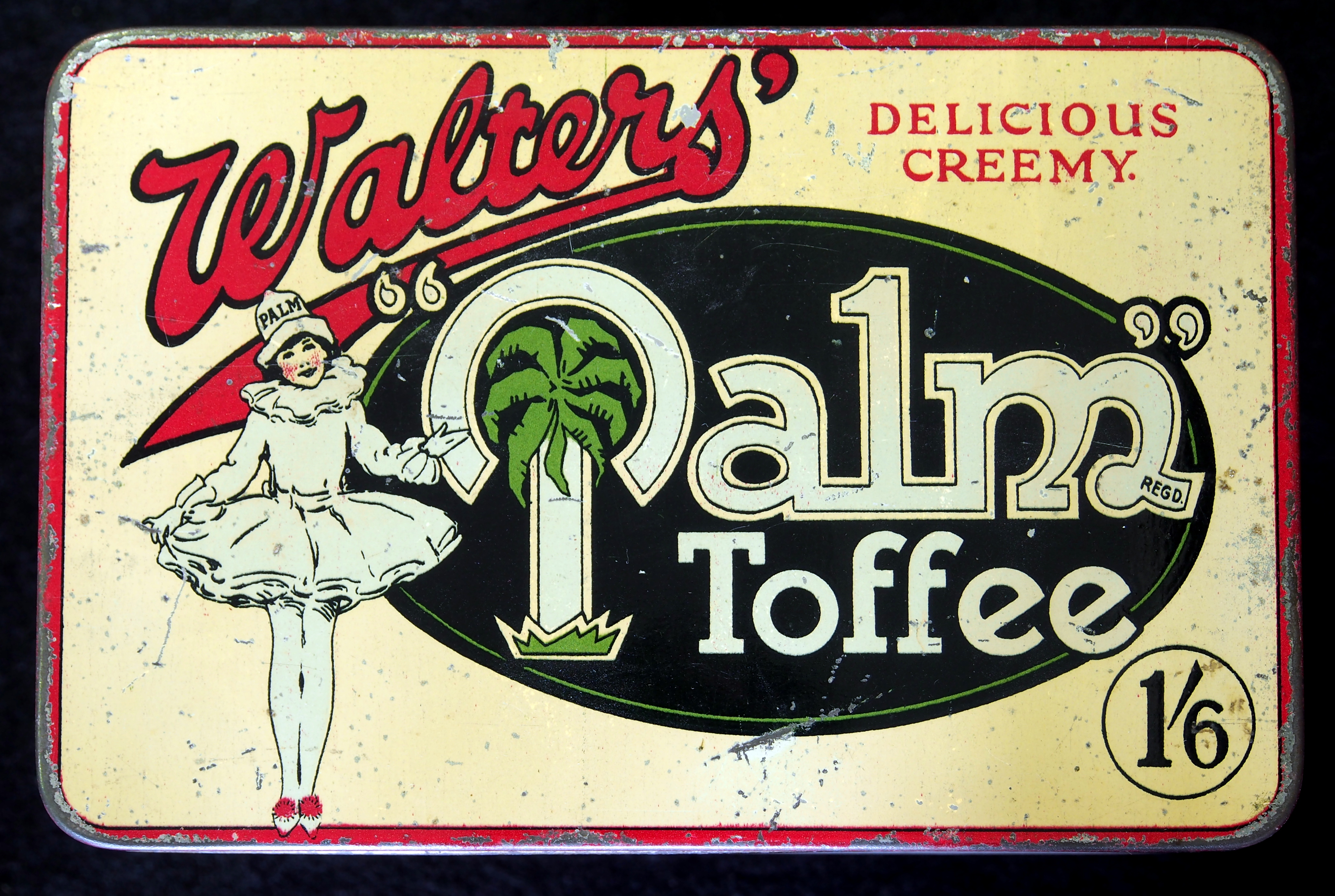
Walters Palm Toffee tin

Walters Palm Toffee was established by Nathan Baraf Walters, a naturalised Romanian immigrant, as a toffee factory in Poplar, London in 1887. The company's main product was so named as such as it used Palm butter in its manufacturing. The company moved to a larger factory in Acton, London during 1926, and was incorporated in 1928. By 1935 the company employed around 800 people, but the factory was destroyed by fire later that year but was rebuilt. In 1957, Nathan Walters died and left the business to four Jewish charities, a will that his four sons contested unsuccessfully. By 1960 the company was losing money, and a friendly takeover by J A & P Holland was secured.

== History of Fillerys Toffees ==
Fillerys Toffees was founded at Warwick Road, Birmingham by a consortium in 1923. The site expanded to four acres by 1927 and had moved to 24-hour production by 1930. The company was incorporated in 1934 and employed around 300 people. During World War II the factory moved over to munitions, with the company's products manufactured by Rowntree's under license. The company's factory was very efficient and earned contracts for own brand products with Woolworths and Marks & Spencer. The company saw a boom after sugar rationing was dropped in 1954, but later in the decade sales declined in the toffee market, and in 1960 Fillerys were bought by J A & P Holland.

== History of the original Elizabeth Shaw company ==
Elizabeth Joice and her husband Patrick, started a cottage confectionery business making honeycomb mint-flavoured crisps in 1937, named after Elizabeth and taking Shaw from her former employer Page & Shaw. They were soon marketed as Mint Crisps and by 1939 a new factory in Brentford was opened called Mint House. The business continued to grow offering new products including Mint Creams. However the business was damaged by fire in 1953, and the Joice's had to sell the company and production was moved to a factory in Camberley. However the new factory also fell to a devastating fire in 1968, and the business was purchased by Cavenham Foods and production moved to Greenbank.

== History of Hollands of Southport ==
In the 1890s John Holland developed a new way to produce creamy toffee from premises at 23a Cross Street, Southport that had been given to him by his uncle James Ford. Holland had completed an apprenticeship with Ford, a confectioner in Ormskirk. Holland's best-selling product was Everton Toffee. The company opened a new factory at Virginia Street during World War I, and in 1927 John Arthur Holland became manager at the factory, with the business trading as John Holland & Son from 1932. John Arthur Holland took charge of the business from 1936, introducing the brand promise Best on Earth. A fire damaged the doctors in 1940, but after World War II the company expanded, exporting to the United States for the first time in 1953. A year before in 1952 John Arthur's sons, John Arthur Junior and Peter took charge of the business and the company changed its name J A & P Holland.

The company floated on the Liverpool Stock Exchange in 1953, and a year later an extension was added to the Virginia Street factory. The toffee market had started to decline, and the brothers believed they should expand by purchasing rivals. Their first major purchase was Coq D'or Chocolates in 1959. This was followed up by Fillerys Toffees in 1960, a high-end toffee manufacturer who had contracts with Marks & Spencer, which was closely followed by Casket Confectionery and London based Walters Palm Toffee for £385,000. Later that year the company was listed on the London Stock Exchange and the company had taken over 20 firms. The company continued to expand during 1961, purchasing S. Parkinson & Son, Harper Paper for £1.25 million, Mackay Brothers (Confectioners) of Edinburgh and George & Son (confectioners and wholesalers) of Southend-on-Sea amongst other. The Daily Mail called Holland the world's biggest toffee manufacturer, and by 1965 it controlled 33 wholesaling warehouses.

John Arthur Holland Junior invented a soft toffee in 1963, which was launched as Chewzits (later relaunched by Cavenham as Chewits). However the company did not pay out a dividend in 1963 or 1964, with many of its subsidiaries struggling. The company's independent shareholders were in disagreement with the Holland family, and in 1965 James Goldsmith's Cavenham Foods staged a takeover bid which the Holland family fought but lost.

== Cavenham Confectionery Ltd ==
Carsons was joined by Yeatmans, makers of sweet brands Goodies and Selesta, J A & P Holland, Britain's biggest toffee manufacturer, and Paramount Laboratories, makers of Cadet Sweet sweet cigarettes, to form the Cavenham Confectionery arm of Cavenham Foods. As well as Famous Names, the new company's other products included Chewits, Hollands Toffee, Fillery's Toffee, Walters Palm Toffee, Ewbanks Liquorice, Dr Who & The Daleks Sweet Cigarettes, Royal Doncaster Butterscotch and Parkinsons Boiled Sweets. The new company closed many of the factories of its subsidiaries, concentrating production at Carsons' Greenbank site, Holland's Southport location and Parkinsons' Doncaster factory.

In 1967, with Cavenham Foods in financial difficulty, James Goldsmith merged Cavenham Confectionery into a 50/50 partnership with Perrier's confectionery business which included the brands Menier and Lindt. The business exported $750,000 of goods to America in 1968 and purchased the brand and recipes of Elizabeth Shaw. The partnership with Perrier was dissolved in 1969, and Cavenham Confectionery was sold to Conwood SA for £1.2 million, a company owned 50/50 by Cavenham Foods and Conwood Corporation, but was soon sold back to Cavenham Foods. In 1981, the management of Cavenham Confectionery purchased the business as part of James Goldsmith's breakup of Cavenham Foods for £8 million. The business name was changed to Famous Names Ltd.

== Famous Names Ltd to Elizabeth Shaw Ltd ==
The business at the time of its purchase by the management team had 44% of the UK's chocolate liqueurs market and 50% of the chocolate mint trade. The business was purchased by conglomerate Imperial Group in 1985 but was again purchased by its management in 1988, after divestment of business by new owners Hanson Trust plc, and they renamed the business Elizabeth Shaw Ltd with the Famous Brands name dropped. The business was again sold in 1990 to Finnish confectionery business Leaf.

In March 2006 Elizabeth Shaw's chocolate business was purchased by Nói Síríus, the largest confectionery manufacturer in Iceland. In 2006, faced with the high costs associated with the 330,000 sq feet building, the company relocated its manufacturing to factories in the UK and in mainland Europe, and closed the then 105-year-old factory. The business was subsequently purchased by a Norwegian company, Imagine Capital in 2009. In 2016, Colian Holding, Poland's largest confectionery manufacturer, acquired Elizabeth Shaw from Imagine Capital.

== Greenbank factory site ==
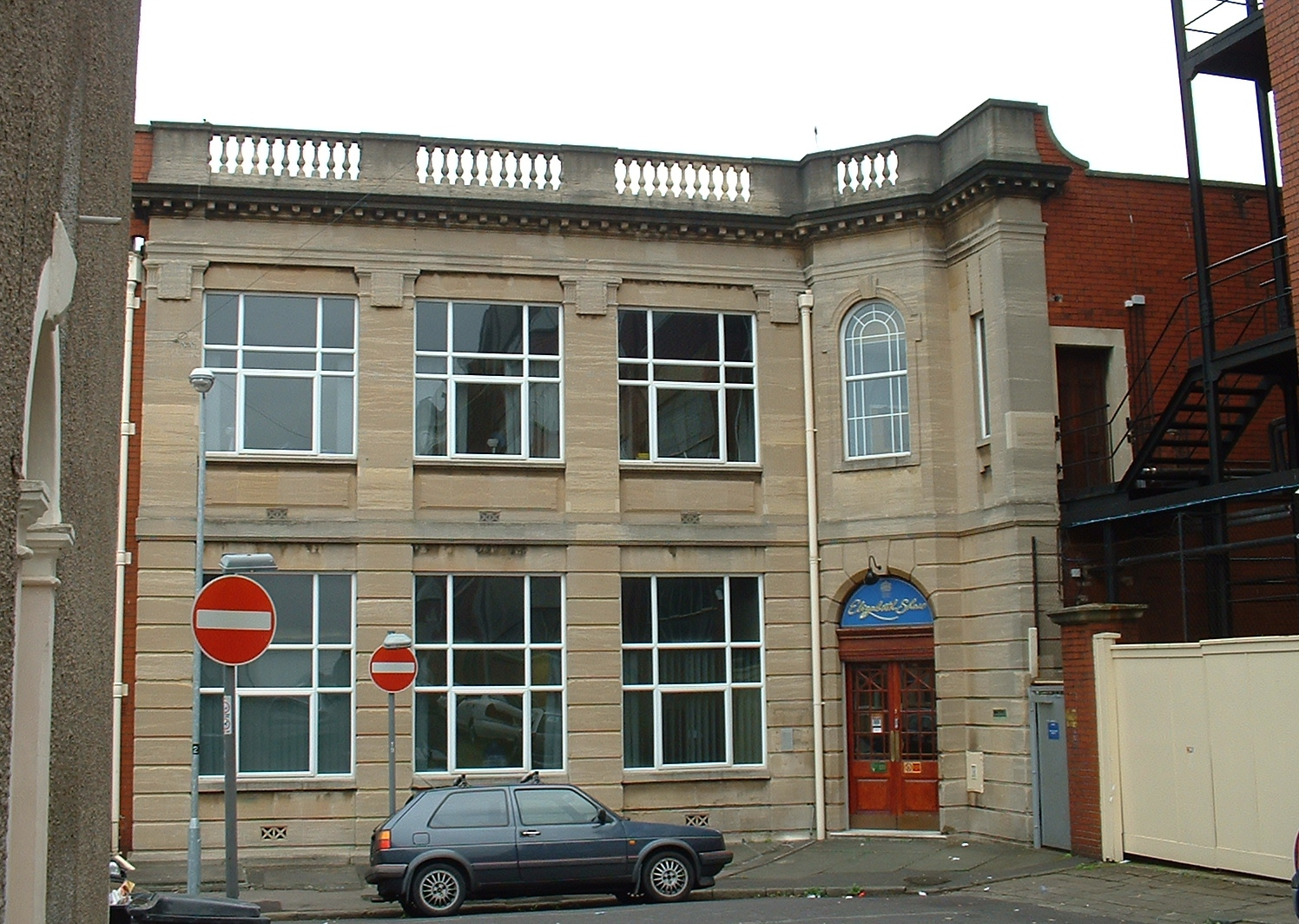
Elizabeth Shaw office alongside the factory in 2004

After the factory closed in 2006 successfully argued against the initial developer's plan for redevelopment of into flats and houses. The building, in the eyes of local residents, represented part of the industrial heritage of Bristol. The opposition to this redevelopment was supported by George Ferguson, whose vision had earlier turned a defunct tobacco factory in Bedminster into one of Bristol's leading artistic and creative venues, called the Tobacco Factory. However, as of 2012, the building was still standing empty, following the failure of all the parties involved in the plan to deliver a second, acceptable and workable solution for the future use of the building and site. More information is held on an archived community group website for the chocolate factory. By late 2013 the building had reverted to the Clydesdale Bank and developments were being planned by the Generator Group. In August 2014, Generator South West submitted a plan for open spaces around a development of flats and housing.

As of 2016 there had been many problems surrounding the development of this site, namely that developers Generator South West "have asked to be excused from the legal obligation that between 30 and 40 per cent of any development be social housing, on the basis that the extra costs of restoring old, historic buildings makes the plan economically unviable."

Community action group ACORN were one of the groups campaigning against this back-tracking on the provision of social housing due to the continuing housing crisis in Bristol and severe lack of social or affordable housing being built. Developers Generator Group worked with Bristol City Council to ensure that 36 shared ownership homes were created alongside the private housing. The first homes to be built for occupation in 2021 were shared ownership. Information about the plan for the 1950s factory block that remains undeveloped, can be found by searching the documents on the city council planning archive

== Archives ==
Records of Elizabeth Shaw Limited, primarily relating to the Greenbank factory, are held at Bristol Archives. The collection also includes some records of HJ Packers, Carsons Ltd, Cavenham Confectionery Ltd, United Biscuits, Hollands Toffees, and Huhtamäki amongst others which are linked with Elizabeth Shaw Limited (Ref. 43258) (online catalogue).
