= Mielnica Mała =

- Village
- Location within Poland
- Coordinates: 52°28′N 18°22′E
- Country: Poland
- Voivodeship: Greater Poland
- County: Konin
- Gmina: Skulsk

Mielnica Mała [mjɛlˈnit͡sa ˈmawa] is a village in the administrative district of Gmina Skulsk, within Konin County, Greater Poland Voivodeship, in west-central Poland.
