= Paniewo, Greater Poland Voivodeship =

Paniewo
- Village
- Location within Poland
- Coordinates: 52°27′55″N 18°19′9″E
- Country: Poland
- Voivodeship: Greater Poland
- County: Konin
- Gmina: Skulsk
- Population: 120

Paniewo [paˈɲɛvɔ] is a village in the administrative district of Gmina Skulsk, within Konin County, Greater Poland Voivodeship, in west-central Poland.
