= Dzierżysław, Greater Poland Voivodeship =

Dzierżysław
- Village
- Location within Poland
- Coordinates: 52°28′45″N 18°15′27″E
- Country: Poland
- Voivodeship: Greater Poland
- County: Konin
- Gmina: Skulsk

Dzierżysław [d͡ʑɛrˈʐɨswaf] is a village in the administrative district of Gmina Skulsk, within Konin County, Greater Poland Voivodeship, in west-central Poland.
