= Celinowo, Greater Poland Voivodeship =

Celinowo
- Village
- Location within Poland
- Coordinates: 52°26′16″N 18°19′33″E
- Country: Poland
- Voivodeship: Greater Poland
- County: Konin
- Gmina: Skulsk

Celinowo [t͡sɛliˈnɔvɔ] is a village in the administrative district of Gmina Skulsk, within Konin County, Greater Poland Voivodeship, in west-central Poland.
