= Zalesie, Gmina Skulsk =

Zalesie
- Settlement
- Location within Poland
- Coordinates: 52°26′32″N 18°16′37″E
- Country: Poland
- Voivodeship: Greater Poland
- County: Konin
- Gmina: Skulsk

Zalesie [zaˈlɛɕɛ] is a settlement in the administrative district of Gmina Skulsk, within Konin County, Greater Poland Voivodeship, in west-central Poland.
