= Mielnica Duża =

- Village
- Location within Poland
- Coordinates: 52°29′N 18°22′E
- Country: Poland
- Voivodeship: Greater Poland
- County: Konin
- Gmina: Skulsk
- Time zone: UTC+1 (Central European Time)
- ISO 3166 code: POL

Mielnica Duża [mjɛlˈnit͡sa ˈduʐa] is a village in the administrative district of Gmina Skulsk, within Konin County, Greater Poland Voivodeship, in west-central Poland.
