= Radwańczewo =

- Village
- Location within Poland
- Coordinates: 52°28′53″N 18°16′9″E
- Country: Poland
- Voivodeship: Greater Poland
- County: Konin
- Gmina: Skulsk

Radwańczewo [radvaɲˈt͡ʂɛvɔ] is a village in the administrative district of Gmina Skulsk, within Konin County, Greater Poland Voivodeship, in west-central Poland.
