= Nowa Wieś, Gmina Skulsk =

Nowa Wieś
- Settlement
- Location within Poland
- Coordinates: 52°25′48″N 18°17′02″E
- Country: Poland
- Voivodeship: Greater Poland
- County: Konin
- Gmina: Skulsk

Nowa Wieś [ˈnɔva ˈvjɛɕ] is a settlement in the administrative district of Gmina Skulsk, within Konin County, Greater Poland Voivodeship, in west-central Poland.
