= Rakowo, Konin County =

Rakowo
- Village
- Location within Poland
- Coordinates: 52°29′N 18°17′E
- Country: Poland
- Voivodeship: Greater Poland
- County: Konin
- Gmina: Skulsk

Rakowo [raˈkɔvɔ] is a village in the administrative district of Gmina Skulsk, within Konin County, Greater Poland Voivodeship, in west-central Poland.
