= Kobylanki, Greater Poland Voivodeship =

Kobylanki
- Village
- Location within Poland
- Coordinates: 52°26′N 18°17′E
- Country: Poland
- Voivodeship: Greater Poland
- County: Konin
- Gmina: Skulsk

Kobylanki [kɔbɨˈlanki] is a village in the administrative district Gmina Skulsk, within Konin County, Greater Poland Voivodeship, in west-central Poland.
