= Wandowo, Greater Poland Voivodeship =

Wandowo
- Village
- Location within Poland
- Coordinates: 52°26′12″N 18°18′16″E
- Country: Poland
- Voivodeship: Greater Poland
- County: Konin
- Gmina: Skulsk
- Population: 50

Wandowo [vanˈdɔvɔ] is a village in the administrative district of Gmina Skulsk, within Konin County, Greater Poland Voivodeship, in west-central Poland.
