= Chewits =

Brand of candy

The former logo of Chewits used from 2009 to 2019

Chewits is the brand name of a cuboid-shaped, soft chewy candy manufactured by Cloetta.

== History ==
The sweets were first produced in 1963 as "Chewzits", manufactured by J A & P Holland in Southport. In 1965, J A & P Holland were acquired by James Goldsmith and amalgamated into Cavenham Foods along with several other confectionery companies, forming Cavenham Confectionery. Following the merger the name was changed to "Chewits". In 2006, the UK manufacturing facility closed and the production was moved to Slovakia.

Chewits has greatly expanded its line of flavours; however, the original flavours consisted of Strawberry, Blackcurrant, Orange and Banana. Over the years, more exotic flavors such as Ice Cream, Cola, Rhubarb & Custard, and Blue Mint were introduced as limited edition flavours. In 2000, the sour flavours Apple and Tutti Frutti were launched, and other fizzy and hot flavours were available for a limited time. New Chewits pack designs, formats, and flavours were launched in 2009. Currently, Chewits’ core flavour range includes Strawberry, Blackcurrant, Fruit Salad, Lemon Xtreme, Cola, Blue Raspberry and Cherry.

Ice Cream Chewits, originally released in 1989, were re-introduced in 2009 following an online petition and demand expressed on Facebook and Bebo.

== Television advertising ==
The new-look Chewie the Chewitsaurus, introduced in 2009.

Chewits was first advertised on television in 1976. The original advertisements featured Chewie the Chewitsaurus, a Godzilla-resembling mascot on the hunt for something chewy to eat. The first ad featuring Chewie threatening New York was made by French Gold Abbott and created by John Clive and Ian Whapshot. The first ad was successful, but the sequel was delayed. Chewie chomps and tramples humorously local and well-known international landmarks such as Barrow-in-Furness Bus Depot, a London block of flats, London Bridge, the Taj Mahal, the Leaning Tower of Pisa, and the Empire State Building. Chewie could only be quelled by a pack of Chewits.

A spin-off computer game, The Muncher, was released for the ZX Spectrum in 1988.

The original adverts used Claymation special effects, similar in style to those made famous in the movies of Ray Harryhausen. They also included a voiceover style reminiscent of a 1950s radio serial.

A subsequent advertisement, which originally aired in 1995, plays on the over-the-top advertising style of the post-war era. To the tune of bright 1950s-era orchestration, a sales narrator exhorts viewers to try a variety of chewy consumer items in the essential guide to a chewier chew. The ad shows Chewie sampling items such as Wellington boots, a rubber boat and a rubber plant to be ready for the chewiest of chews - Chewits.

In the late 1990s, Chewits experimented with ads showing multiple newscasting dinosaur puppets. The catchphrase advice at the close of each 'broadcast' was to "do it before you chew it". This style of ads was relatively short-lived for Chewits.

With a change of advertising agencies, the puppets were replaced by colourful 2D animations. Chewie the Chewitsaurus was re-introduced in two popular adverts from this time. In the first, which aired in 1999, Chewie roller skates on two buses through a busy city scene. The second, which went out a year later in 2001, shows Chewie waterskiing at a popular seaside resort. The ads included a rendition of the 1994 hit song 'I Like to Move It' by Reel 2 Real, with the chorus, "I Like to Chewit Chewit."

In 2003, after a further shift in advertising agencies, a new ad was aired showing a wide range of animals auditioning to be the new faces of Chewits. The ad announced the return of the iconic dinosaur Chewie mascot, now dubbed 'Chewie the Chewitsaurus'.

In 2009, Chewits introduced the new Chewie the Chewitsaurus look, showing a contemporary, computer-game-style slick design. Chewie the Chewitsaurus features on all Chewits packaging and sponsorship activity.

In late 2019, a new design was introduced for Chewie, with a mottled paint effect on the colours, and more exaggerated mouth and teeth.

== Social media ==
In 2009, Chewits launched a social media campaign with the new-look Chewie the Chewitsaurus. The Facebook page titled “Chewie the Chewitsaurus” and has established over 400,000 ‘likes’ in its lifetime. Copyrighting on the Facebook page is derived from, and reminiscent of the 1950s radio serial narrator style from the previous TV advertising campaigns.

== Former advertising slogans ==
- “I like to Chewit Chewit, I like to… CHEWIT”
- "Chewits, even chewier than a 15-storey block of flats"
- "No fruit chew chews chewier"
- "No fruit chews chewier"
- "Chew for victory"
- "Chews flash"
- "Do it before you Chewit"
- "Chew Chewits coz' Chewits do it"
- "He likes to Chewit"
- "He likes to share them"
- "For monster chewers only"
- "There's no escaping the chew hit"
- "Chewier than Barrow-in-Furness bus depot"
- “Chew it like Newport County Football Club”
- “Chewitlicious, definition: make them boys go chewing”

== Current advertising slogans ==
- "Born to be chewie"
- "Unleash the taste adventure"
- "Can you handle it?"
- "For xtreme chewers only"

== Promotion and sponsorship ==
Chewits have been involved in a range of promotional activity over the years including the Chewits log flume at Pleasureland in Southport. More recently, Chewits have sponsored several sport and activity-related programmes for children in the UK.

Chewits Sports Courses, in partnership with children's coaching organisation Premier Sport, run daily during school holidays and provide sporting activity courses to approximately 125,000 children in the UK. The sponsorship is supported by sporting ambassadors Lawrence Dallaglio, Duncan Goodhew and Paul Sculthorpe.

Chewits began sponsoring the Lancashire County Cricket's junior membership club, the Lancashire Thunderbolts, in February 2009.

In 2009, Chewits launched a programme to help young sporting hopefuls ahead of the London Olympics in 2012. The Chewits Young Sporting Ambassador programme provides financial support and coaching to sponsored athletes.

In 2011, Chewits partnered with Team Extreme and held an extreme sports road show to promote the Xtreme range of products.

== Dietary restrictions ==
Chewits subscribes to the Betreatwise program, a UK program that encourages people to think about the treats they eat as a part of a healthy and well balanced diet, and to use the Guideline Daily Amounts (GDAs) on the back of packs for nutritional guidance.

Most flavours of Chewits are approved (but not supervised) for those who keep kosher, as per the London Beth Din's list.

== Current products ==
- Blackcurrant, Blue Raspberry, Fruit Salad, Strawberry, Cola and Cherry individual packs
- Fruit Multipack
- Xtreme Sour Apple
- Xtreme Tutti Frutti
