= Butterscotch =

Type of confectionery

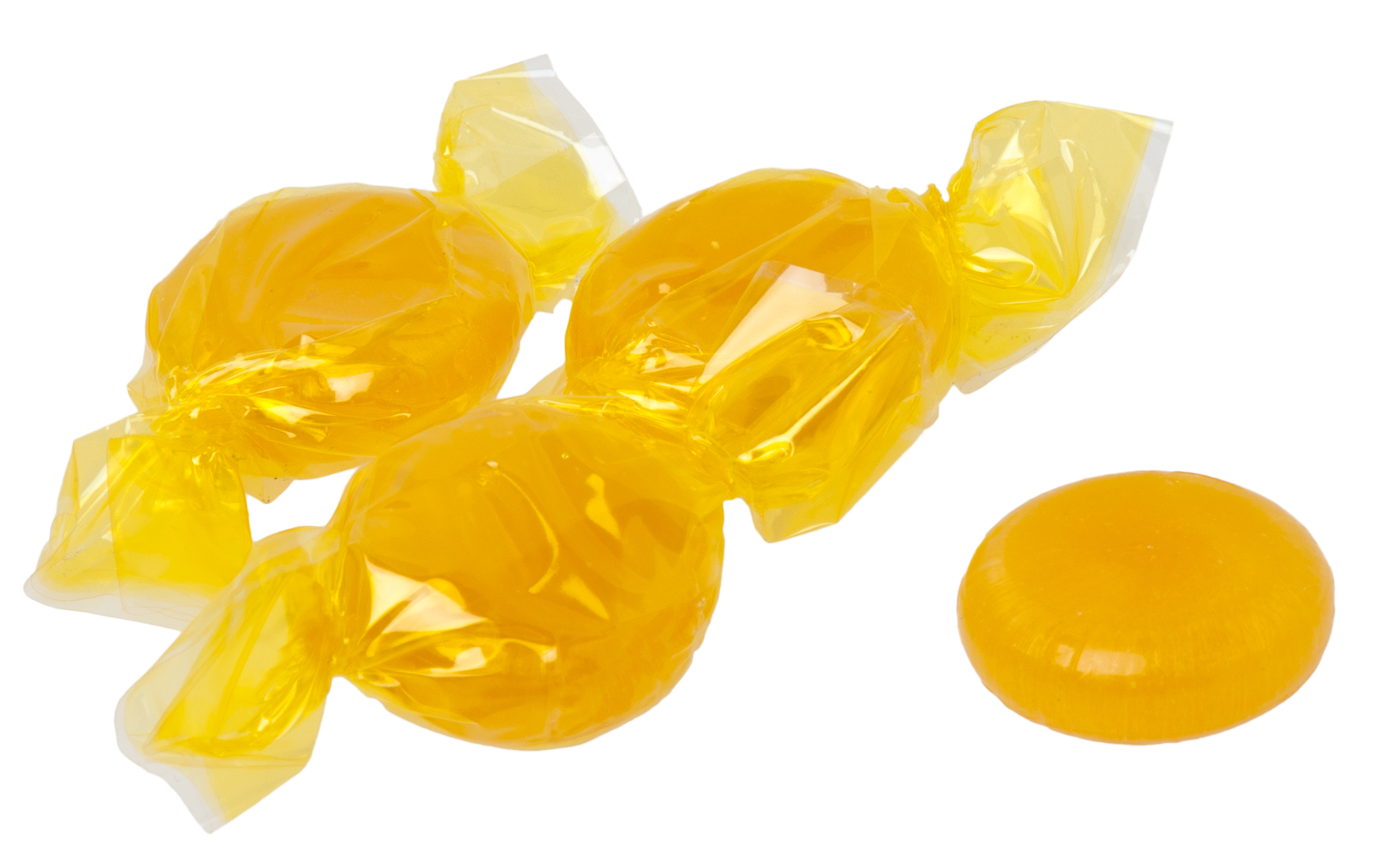
- Butterscotch sweets
- Type: Confectionery
- Place of origin: England
- Region or state: Doncaster, Yorkshire
- Main ingredients: Brown sugar, butter

Butterscotch is a type of confection whose primary ingredients are brown sugar and butter. Some recipes include cream, vanilla, and salt. The earliest known recipes, in mid-19th century Yorkshire, used treacle (molasses) in place of, or in addition to, sugar.

Butterscotch is similar to toffee, but the sugar is boiled to the soft crack stage, not hard crack. Often credited with their invention, S. Parkinson & Sons of Doncaster made butterscotch boiled sweets and sold them in tins, which became one of the town's best-known exports. They became famous in 1851 after Queen Victoria was presented with a tin when she visited the town.

The term "butterscotch" is also often used more specifically for the flavour of brown sugar and butter together, even if the actual confection butterscotch is not involved, such as in butterscotch pudding (a type of custard).

== Etymology ==
Food historians have several theories regarding the name and origin of this confectionery, but none are conclusive. One explanation is the meaning "to cut or score" for the word "scotch", as the confection must be cut into pieces, or "scotched", before hardening. Alternatively, the "scotch" may derive from the word "scorch". In 1855, F. K. Robinson's Glossary of Yorkshire Words explained Butterscotch as "a treacle ball with an amalgamation of butter in it".

== History ==
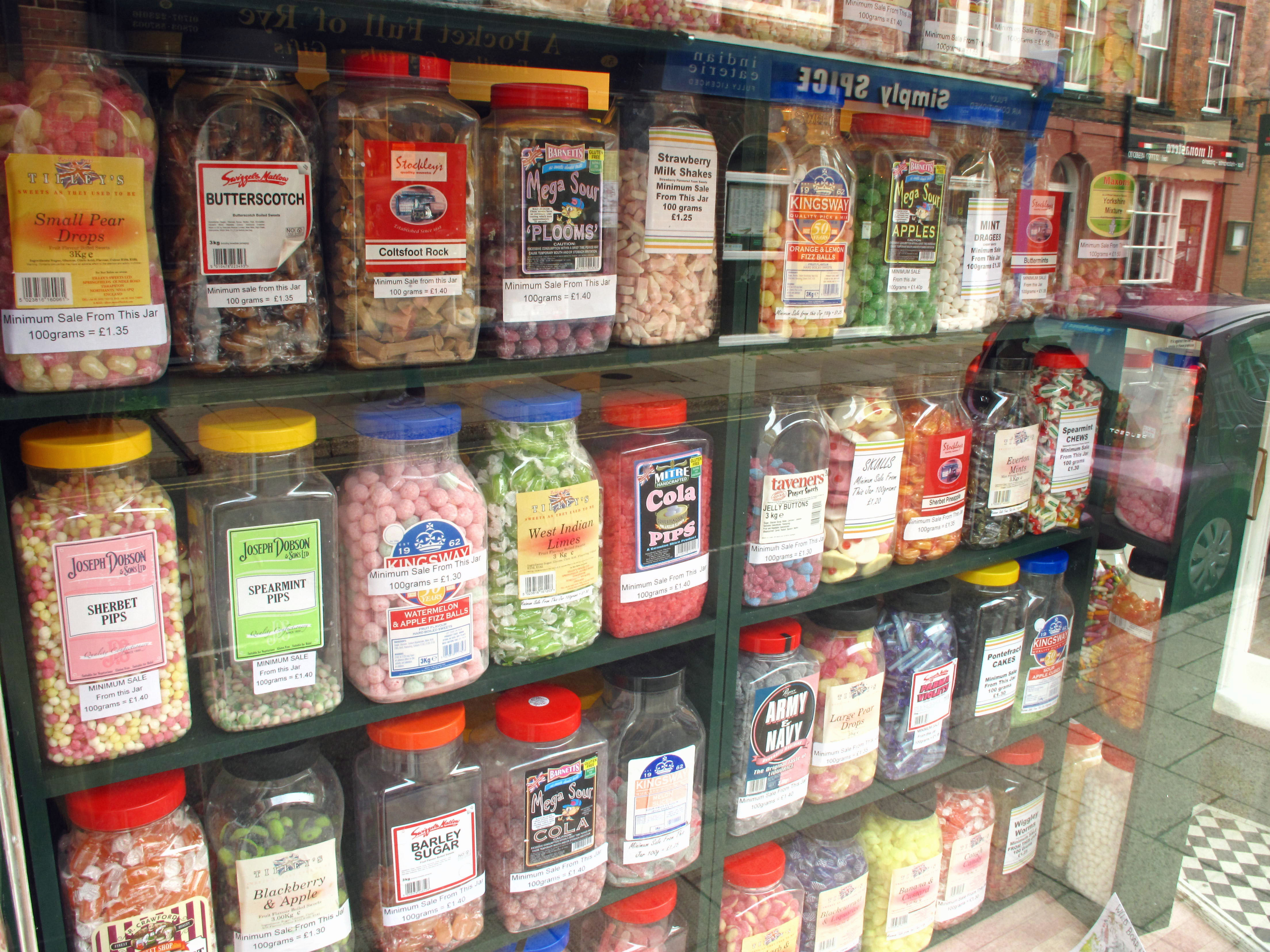
Butterscotch sweets (top row second from left) sold in a shop in Rye, East Sussex, England

Early mentions of butterscotch associate the confection with Doncaster in Yorkshire. An 1848 issue of the Liverpool Mercury gave a recipe for "Doncaster butterscotch" as "one pound of butter, one pound of sugar and a quarter of a pound of treacle, boiled together" (500 g each of butter and sugar and 125 g treacle).

By 1851, Doncaster butterscotch was sold commercially by rival confectioners S. Parkinson & Sons (the original Parkinson recipe is still made today), Henry Hall, and Booth's via agents elsewhere in Yorkshire. Parkinson's started to use and advertise the Doncaster Church as their trademark. It was advertised as "Royal Doncaster Butterscotch", or "The Queen's Sweetmeat", and said to be "the best emollient for the chest in the winter season". Parkinson's Butterscotch was by appointment to the royal household and was presented to the Princess Elizabeth, then the Duchess of Edinburgh, in 1948 and to Anne, Princess Royal in 2007. In the late 19th and early 20th centuries, the British sweet became popular in the U.S.

== Packaging and products ==
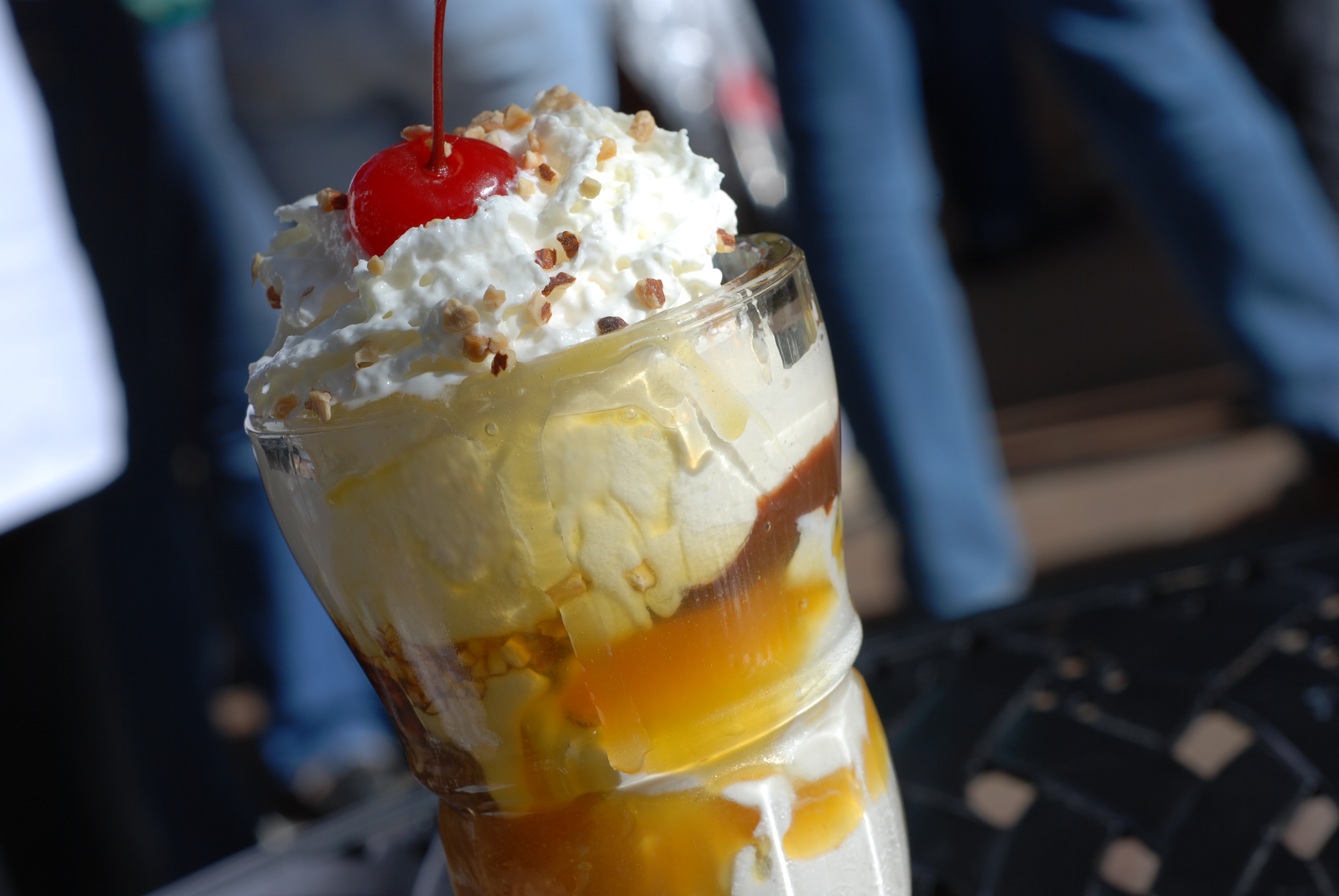
A butterscotch sundae

Butterscotch is often used as a flavour for items such as dessert sauce, ice-cream, pudding, and biscuits (cookies). To that end, it can be bought in "butterscotch chips" made with hydrogenated (solid) fats to be similar for baking use to chocolate chips. Also, individually wrapped, translucent yellow hard candies (butterscotch disks) are made with an artificial butterscotch flavour. In addition, butterscotch-flavoured liqueur is in production.

== Sauce ==
Butterscotch sauce is made of brown sugar cooked to 240 °F (116 °C) mixed with butter and cream.

== See also ==
- Blondie (confection)
- Caramel
- Werther's Original
