= Gmina Skulsk =

Gmina Skulsk Skulsk Commune
- Gmina
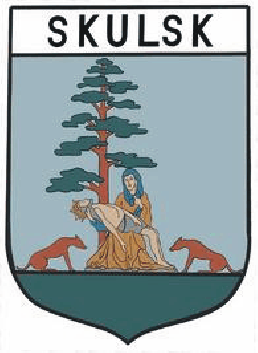
- Coat of arms

- Coordinates (Skulsk): 52°29′N 18°20′E
- Country: Poland
- Voivodeship: Greater Poland
- County: Konin County
- Seat: Skulsk

Area
  - Total: 84.86 km^{2} (32.76 sq mi)

Population (2006)
  - Total: 6,145
  - Density: 72.41/km^{2} (187.5/sq mi)
- Website: http://www.gmina-skulsk.pl

Gmina Skulsk is a rural gmina (administrative district) in Konin County, Greater Poland Voivodeship, in west-central Poland. Its seat is the village of Skulsk, which lies approximately 30 kilometres (19 mi) north of Konin and 97 km (60 mi) east of the regional capital Poznań.

The gmina covers an area of 84.86 square kilometres (32.8 sq mi), and as of 2006 its total population is 6,145.

== Villages ==
Gmina Skulsk contains the villages and settlements of Buszkowo, Buszkowo-Parcele, Celinowo, Czartówek, Czartowo, Dąb, Dzierżysław, Galiszewo, Gawrony, Goplana, Kobylanki, Kolonia Warzymowska, Koszewo, Lisewo, Lisewo-Parcele, Łuszczewo, Mielnica Duża, Mielnica Mała, Mniszki B, Nowa Wieś, Paniewo, Piastowo, Pilich, Popielewo, Przyłubie, Radwańczewo, Rakowo, Skulsk, Skulska Wieś, Starostwo, Wandowo, Warzymowo, Włodzimiera, Zalesie and Zygmuntowo.

== Neighbouring gminas ==
Gmina Skulsk is bordered by the gminas of Jeziora Wielkie, Kruszwica, Piotrków Kujawski, Ślesin, Wierzbinek and Wilczyn.
