= Goplana (confectionery) =

Confectionery company, 1912, Poznań, Poland

Coordinates: 52°25′01″N 16°54′07″E

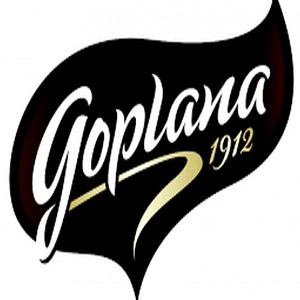
- Goplana logo
- Company type: Joint-stock company
- Industry: Confectionery
- Founded: 1912 in Poznań, Kingdom of Prussia
- Founder: Janusz and Wiesław Wilkoński, Tadeusz Prądzyński
- Headquarters: Poznań, Poland
- Products: Sugar confections
- Owner: Colian Holding
- Website: www.goplana.pl

Goplana is a confectionery factory and brand in Poznań, currently belonging to the Colian Holding, seated in Opatówek in the Greater Poland Voivodeship.

== History ==
=== German Empire ===
On 22 April 1911, Janusz and Wiesław Wilkoński established the Poznań Chocolate Factory "Luna" (Polish: Poznańska Fabryka Czekolady „Luna). Registered under the number 147, it was a Private limited company with a share capital of 80,000 marks. On 6 December, the firm name was changed to Poznańska Fabryka Czekolady "Gonda".

On 17 July 1913, with Tadeusz Prądzyński entering the company capital, the name was modified as Poznańska Fabryka Czekolady "Goplana". This new appellation was intended to emphasize the regional and national character of the factory and tease Polish customers.

At that time, the plant occupied a one-storey building at 9/10 Warschauerstrasse in Poznań (where the Śródka roundabout is currently located). First productions were hard chocolate tablets, chocolate lozenges, and sweets made of chocolate and marzipan. The company employed about thirty workers (mostly women) and the annual output was around one hundred tons.

The First World War conflict limited the operations because cocoa was an expensive import raw material. However, some items were manufactured such as "Fondants" and "Chocolate accessories" with a fondant kernel, thanks to the purchase in 1916 of a special machine.

=== Second Polish Republic ===
On 29 July 1921, the company was dissolved, but a month earlier (16 June) had been set up "Goplana", Poznańska Fabryka Czekolady, a joint-stock company registered with a capital of 15 million Polish marks. The name Goplana referred to a water nymph from the Lake Gopło.

That same year, three plots of land -13,174 square metres (3.255 acres)- were bought at 28 Św. Wawrzyńca street in the district of Jeżyce. Production devices were moved from Warszawska street to the former stables of the new premises.

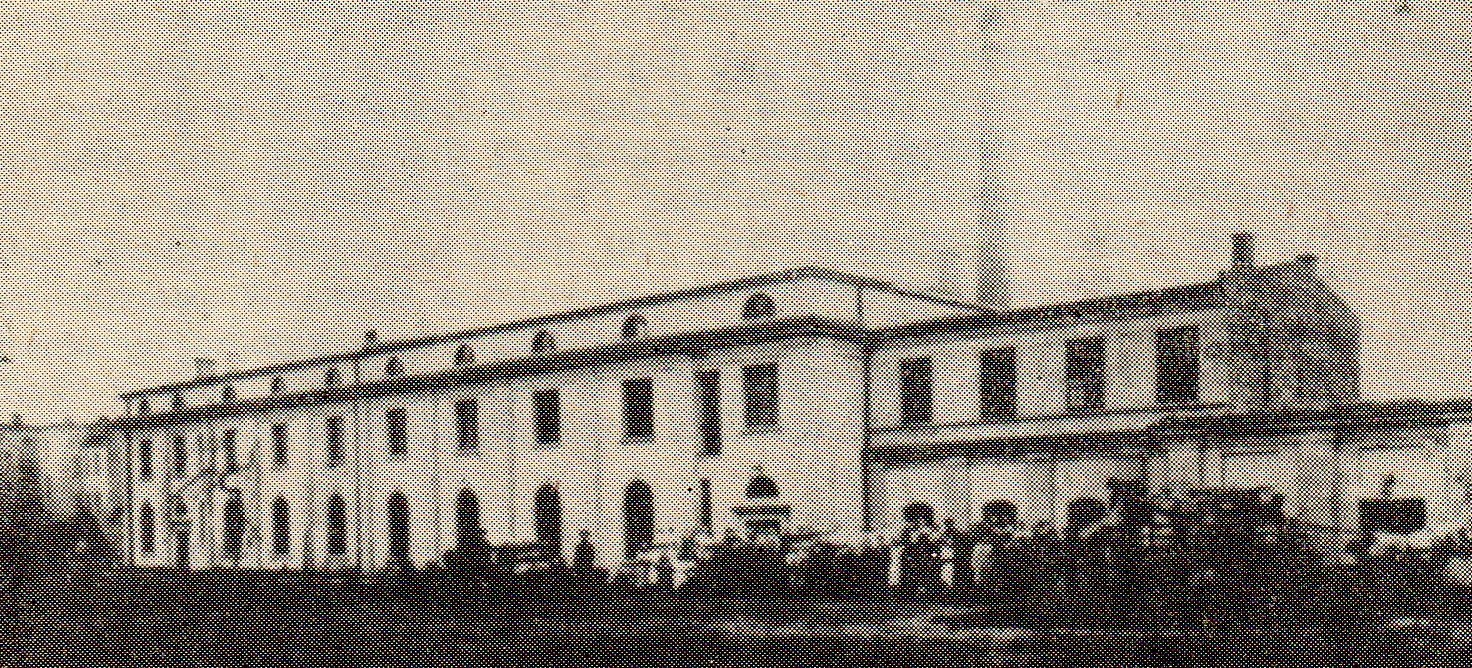
Goplana factory on Św. Wawrzyńca street ca. 1922

In 1922, the neighboring house was purchased and by 1925 a new and larger factory was completed on the site. Concurrently, major purchases were carried out, including 42 machines for the production of chocolate and chocolate accessories. On 19 June 1926, a new own boiler room was installed, comprising two generators with a power of 115 and 85 kW, covering the energy needs of the plant.

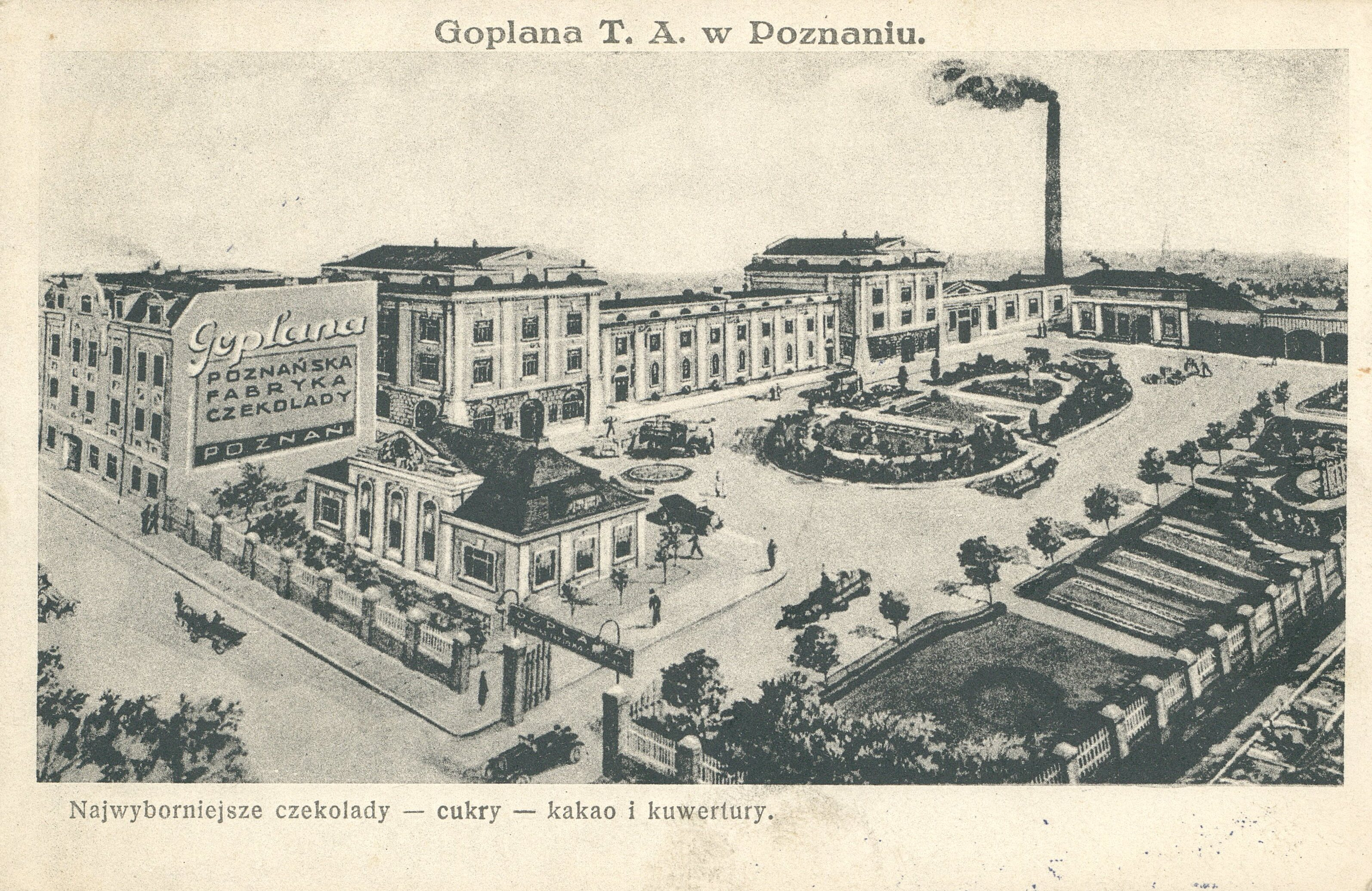
Goplana premises in 1927

In 1931, a small production line of long-lasting bread was launched. that same year, a factory store opened at Wolności square 10 in Poznań, which survived there until the 1990s. Poznań's craftsman Ludwik Bręczewski built for the occasion a two-chamber oven. In 1935, two additional cooking ovens were built: one for confectionery and another for waffle. Between 1934 and 1936, new production lines were launched: dragées and biscuits. At that time, although machines were pervasive, some of the work was still done manually, e.g. wrapping and packaging. From 1928 on, trucks gradually replaced horse-drawn transport.

In the first years under the Polish flag, Goplana focused mainly on the production of chocolate and chocolate accessories. However, from 1928 onwards, the catalogue expanded:

- pastilles, sweets, caramels and toffee candies (1928);
- biscuits, sponge cakes and gingerbread (1931);
- dragées (1934);
- wafers, home-made confiture and marmalades (1935).

The Great Depression deeply affected the operations and despite investments the plant did not bring the expected profits. Improvements simmered in 1936-1937, and in 1938 the company was again profitable.

=== German occupation ===
During the September 1939 invasion, the plant did not suffer major damage from the German forces. On 9 October 1939, the facility was taken over by the occupying authorities and handed over to the Treuhandstelle Ost.

It was then managed by the German merchant Frido Kleiss. On 2 September 1940, the factory was sold to Kaisers Kaffeegeschäft (English: Coffee shop) from Viersen, for over 626,000 marks: it was re-named "Gotana" Schokoladenfabrik G.m.b.H..

Between 1940 and 1942, the activity was limited to products for the frontline war needs: (candies with vitamin C, stuffed caramels, drinking chocolate, biscuits and sugar coated products). The factory also centralized items from other German manufacturers in order to pack and ship them to the military. Until 1942, marmalade was also produced for local customers, made from cultivated carrots, beetroots and saccharin.

From 1943 on, pieces for gas masks were produced on the first floor of the plant. Management positions were filled by Germans while Poles worked in production lines (about 150 people).

=== PRL Period (1946–1989) ===
At the end of WWII, the factory only assessed 10% of destruction. However, most of the machines had been taken away and stocks were at a very low level (dyes, essences, fruit purees and packaging).

On 2 February 1945, during the Battle of Poznań, a group of former employees took over and secured the facility. Just a few days later, the production of caramels resumed without electricity using cauldrons on open fires. Initially, employees were paid with sugar (given from the Soviet troops) and later with bread or marmalade. At the end of February 1945, Russians troops started baking bread in the repaired bakery. In March, the boiler room was restored: it first enabled the production of marmalade and later gingerbread and biscuits (in November). On 28 March 1945, Mieczysław Konieczny was appointed as director of the factory, now under state management. In the years 1946-1949, any war damage was entirely removed.

Nationalization occurred on 1 January 1946: the facility was renamed Fabryka Czekolady, Cukrów i Keksów Nr 1 „Goplana” (English: Chocolate, Sugar and Fruit Cake Factory No. 1 "Goplana") and was subordinated to the State Union of Confectionery Industry based in Poznań.

In 1949, the authorities established the Poznańskie Zjednoczone Fabryki Cukrów i Czekolady (English: Poznań United Sugar and Chocolate Factory) which not only supervised "Goplana", but also factories from Kargowa and Poznań's "Ira" in Święty Wojciech street. As part of the Three-Year Plan, it was decided to expand the factory, with works beginning in 1950. Several plots in the same street were acquired in this perspective:

- on 4 May 1950, the adjacent vodka factory of Józef Strzelczykto;
- on 20 September 1951, the city of Poznań offered another strip of land;
- in 1952, a nearby expropriated area was handed over.

Altogether, these plots were fitted with plants and equipped with modernized machinery: subsequently the production processes were all but mechanized (manual packaging for biscuits was eliminated in 1956, for caramels in 1960).

In early January 1951, this management structure was discontinued and "Goplana" became an independent unit, under the name Zakład Przemysłu Cukierniczy "Goplana".

On April 1, 1966, "Goplana" was merged with Sugar Factory "Rywal" from Leszno, giving birth to the Wielkopolskie Zakłady Przemysłu Cukierniczy. In 1967, the plant in Kargowa was anew incorporated in the structure which took the naming Wielkopolsko-Lubuskie Zakłady Przemysłu Cukierniczy. During all these changes, the seat of the holding stayed located at Święty Wojciech street in Poznań.

Between 1964 and 1966, a completely new manufacturing building was erected and part of the old one was razed, giving room for a social house to be constructed. At the end of the 1960s, over 200 assortments of products were prepared, including biscuits "Deserowe", "Angielskie", "Domowe", "Maczki", "Tureckie", "Koreanki", "Serwetkowe", "Goplanki" and the very popular "Bé-Bé" or "Apricot" and "Cytrynki" caramels.

At the end of 1969, "Goplana" workforce reached 1,530 people. At the beginning of the 1970s, Goplana produced 150 types of sweets and managed a network of 70 retailing shops in Poland.

=== Modern period (1989-present day) ===
After the political transformation in 1989, the company was privatized and bought by Nestlé.

In 2004, Goplana brand was purchased by Jutrzenka Colian Sp. z o. o. (now Colian Holding), established in 2008 and based in Opatówek, Greater Poland Voivodeship.

At the end of 2017, the historical site at Św. Wawrzyńca street closed its doors. With time, operating a factory located nearly in the city center became a challenge: nuisance to the neighborhood, complicated access for trucks and high city taxes were among the main reasons for this move.

On the premises, the company developed the "Goplana Estate". The place still refers to the 100-year tradition of chocolate production, thanks to the presence of educational and commemorative plaques describing the history of the factory and the people who created it.

== Bibliography ==
- (in Polish) Perzyna, Jadwiga (1970). "Zakłady Przemysłu Cukierniczego Goplana (1911-1969). Kronika Miasta Poznania, nr 3/1970" [Goplana Confectionery Industry Plant (1911-1969). Chronicle of the City of Poznań, No. 3/1970]. Wydawnictwo Miejskie W Poznaniu (in Polish). Poznań: Księgarnia Naukowa w Poznaniu: 21–46.
- Kienzler, Iwona (2015). Dwudziestoleci przedwojenne. Tom 48. Kultowe marki [The pre-war twenty years. Volume 48. Cult brands] (in Polish). Edipresse Polska. pp. 47–48. ISBN 978-83-7945-029-9.
