= Colian Holding =

Food industry company in Poland

Colian Holding S.A.
- Company type: Joint-stock company
- Industry: Food
- Predecessor: Jutrzenka Holding S.A.
- Founded: 2008; 18 years ago
- Headquarters: Opatówek, Poland
- Area served: Poland
- Key people: Jan Kolański
- Products: Confectionery, spice, juice, soft drinks, dried fruit
- Revenue: PLN 538.81 million (2008)
- Net income: PLN 76.41 million (2007)
- Total assets: PLN 871.156 million
- Number of employees: 2,000
- Website: www.colian.pl

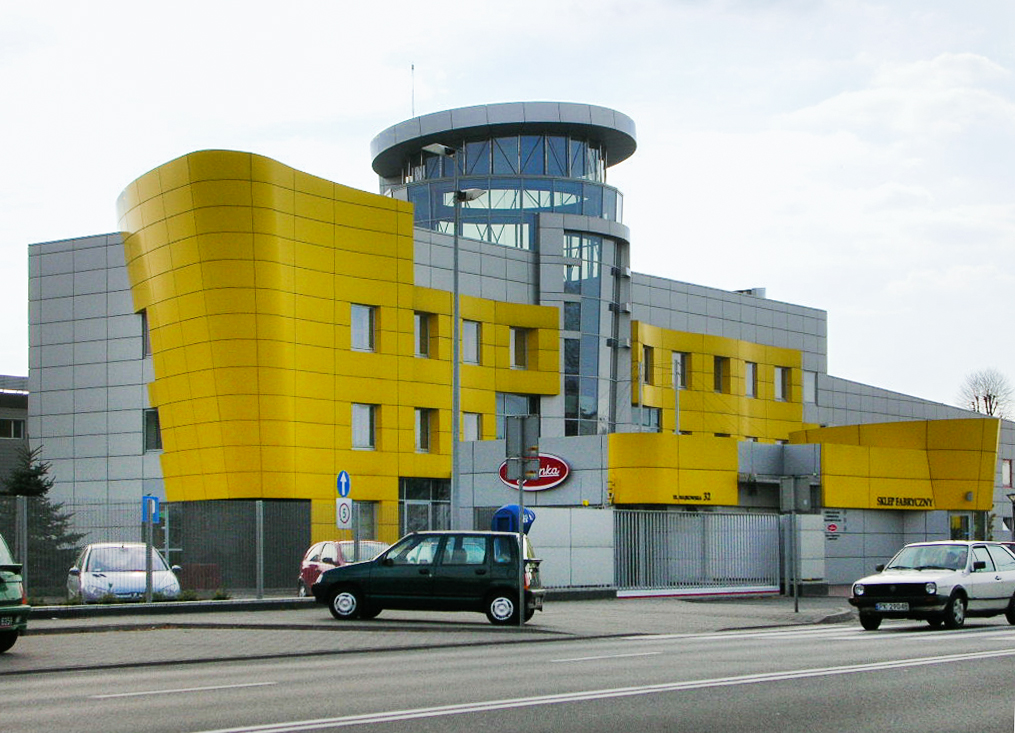
"Kaliszanka" Confectionery Factory, Kalisz

Colian Holding S.A. (from 2014), (until 2011, Jutrzenka Holding S.A.) is a corporate group of enterprises specialised in the food industry controlled by Jan Kolański. The headquarters of the dominating corporate unit is located in Opatówek near Kalisz, Poland.

== Structure ==
Colian Holding is a corporate group with Polish capital in the confectionery market, in competition with international syndicates. The Holding specialises in the production, distribution and sale of food stuffs in the sphere of confectionery, soft drinks and spices. The corporate group is divided in: Colian Sp. z o.o., the producer of branded food stuffs, and Colian Logistic Sp. z o.o., dealing with the storage and distribution of corporate products. The corporation holds a distribution centre in Kostrzyn. In 2016, Colian purchased British confectionery brand Elizabeth Shaw from Imagine Capital.

Colian Holding introduced the following regulations to structure is quality of produce: ISO 9001, ISO 14001, HACCP, International Food Standard, British Retail Consortium, as well as certificates to for Eastern European markets in Ukraine, Belarus and Russia.

Colian Holding holds production plants in:

- Bydgoszcz– formerly Zakłady Przemysłu Cukierniczego „Jutrzenka”,
- Kalisz – formerly Fabryka Pieczywa Cukierniczego „Kaliszanka”
- Lublin – formerly Fabryka Cukiernicza „Solidarność”
- Opatówek – formerly Fabryka Napojów „Hellena”
- Poznań – formerly Zakłady Przemysłu Cukierniczego „Goplana”
- Wykroty – spice factory

The Colian Holding's Commercial Bureau is located in Warsaw. Over 13% of the Holding's national production is exported to over 60 countries worldwide. The Holding's annual income reaches 900 million zlotys, and employs around 2,000 people.

== Brands and products ==
=== Confectionery ===
- Jutrzenka – Familijne biscuits and waffles, Petit Beurre and Be Be biscuits, Elitki butter cookies, Miśki and Akuku ! jelly beans, dried fruit, raisins, cherries, nuts, almonds in chocolate, peanut pebbles (kamyki orzechowe), waffles in a variety of flavours.
- Goplana – Grześki waffle chocolate bars, Jeżyki chocolate biscuits, chocolates, Mella chocolates with jelly, Rajskie Mleczko, Toffino chocolates, gateaus in a variety of flavours, pastilles, mint-flavoured "bubble" chocolate.
- Solidarność – Familijne biscuits, bonbonnieres, chocolates, jelly with filling, pralines, chocolate truffles, chocolate jellies and sweets.
- Elizabeth Shaw Mint Crisps
- Famous Brands Chocolate Liqueurs

=== Soft drinks ===
- Hellena – oranżada, tonic water, soft drinks.

=== Culinary ===
- Appetita – spices, stock, spiced bread crumbs, sugar additives, barbecue grill additives.
- Siesta – dried fruit, drupes, nuts, snacks, popcorn.
