= Czartowo, Greater Poland Voivodeship =

Czartowo
- Village
- Location within Poland
- Coordinates: 52°28′N 18°19′E
- Country: Poland
- Voivodeship: Greater Poland
- County: Konin
- Gmina: Skulsk

Czartowo [t͡ʂarˈtɔvɔ] is a village in the administrative district of Gmina Skulsk, within Konin County, Greater Poland Voivodeship, in west-central Poland.
