= Piastowo, Greater Poland Voivodeship =

Piastowo
- Village
- Location within Poland
- Coordinates: 52°27′18″N 18°21′22″E
- Country: Poland
- Voivodeship: Greater Poland
- County: Konin
- Gmina: Skulsk
- Population: 70

Piastowo [pjasˈtɔvɔ] is a village in the administrative district of Gmina Skulsk, within Konin County, Greater Poland Voivodeship, in west-central Poland.
