= Lisewo-Parcele =

- Village
- Location within Poland
- Coordinates: 52°28′11″N 18°19′58″E
- Country: Poland
- Voivodeship: Greater Poland
- County: Konin
- Gmina: Skulsk

Lisewo-Parcele [liˈsɛvɔ parˈt͡sɛlɛ] is a settlement (colony) in Greater Poland Voivodeship, Poland located in the Gmina Skulsk, Konin County.
