= Skulsk =

- Village
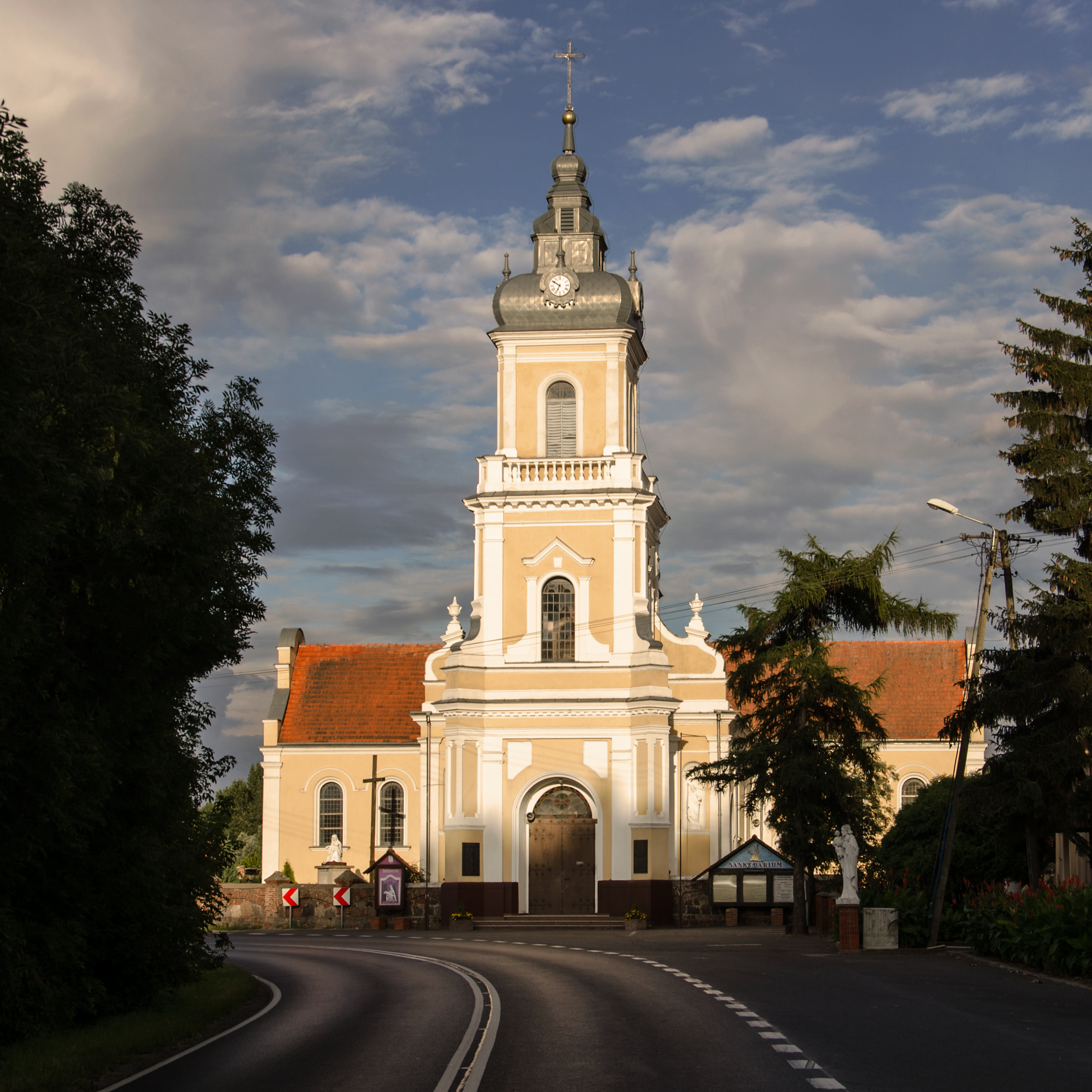
- Church of the Nativity of the Virgin Mary in Skulsk

- Location within Poland
- Coordinates: 52°29′N 18°20′E
- Country: Poland
- Voivodeship: Greater Poland
- County: Konin
- Gmina: Skulsk

Population
  - Total: 1,400
- Time zone: UTC+1 (CET)
  - Summer (DST): UTC+2 (CEST)
- Vehicle registration: PKN
- Website: http://www.skulsk.pl/

Skulsk [skulsk] is a village in Konin County, Greater Poland Voivodeship, in central Poland. It is the seat of the gmina (administrative district) called Gmina Skulsk.

Skulsk was a royal town of the Kingdom of Poland, administratively located in the Kruszwica County in the Brześć Kujawski Voivodeship in the Greater Poland Province.
