= Jón Ásgeir Jóhannesson =

Icelandic businessman

Jón Ásgeir Jóhannesson (born 27 January 1968 in Reykjavík) is an Icelandic businessman and former CEO of Baugur Group.

== Early career ==
Jón Ásgeir's parents were Jóhannes Jónsson (1940–2013) and Ása Karen Ásgeirsdóttir (1942-), who both worked at the Sláturfélag Suðurlands in Reykjavík. Jón Ásgeir was later to marry Ingibjörg Stefanía (1961-), the daughter of Pálmi Jónsson. Jón Ásgeir has three children with his former wife Linda Margrét Stefánsdóttir: Ása Karen, Anton Felix and Stefán Franz Jónsson (and Ingibjörg has three children: Sigurður Pálmi, Júlíana Sól and Melkorka Katrín). Jón Ásgeir given the following thumbnail portrait by Ármann Þorvaldsson:

The man who was to become the face of the Icelandic business community abroad was Jon Asgeir Johannesson ... With his rugged good looks, he would soon be portrayed in the foreign press as the seductive playboy from the north with glacier eyes ... He was already wearing his trademark leather jackets and had a slight 'bad boy' aura about him that followed him wherever he went. Jon Asgeir is a complex character; you could ask ten different people who know him to describe him and they would all give you different answers. To people that didn’t know him, he came across as a very timid person ... If he didn’t know people, he could grow very quiet, but as soon as the conversation shifted to business and deals, he got very animated. Most of the people who did business with him in the UK found him very charming.

Jón Ásgeir's father, Jóhannes Jónsson, managed a shop, and Jón Ásgeir worked there as a child; starting at the age of thirteen, he rented out supermarket amusement rides; 'during his school years, he always had his own business going on the side, selling popcorn through special stands he set up in shopping malls'. Jón Ásgeir attended the Commercial College of Iceland but in 1989 left before graduating in order to join his recently unemployed father in founding Iceland's first low-price supermarket, Bónus, the first shop being a four-hundred square-metre establishment in Skútuvogur. Within a few years, Bónus was the second largest retailer in Iceland.

== Business empire during the Icelandic boom ==
In August 1992, Bónus's main competitor, Hagkaup, bought a 50% share in Bónus; Hagkaup was owned by the children of its founder, Pálmi Jónsson, one of whom, Ingibjörg Stefanía Pálmadóttir, Jón would later marry. Baugur Group was created to co-ordinate purchases by the two chains in 1993; following at times acrimonious negotiations between Jón Ásgeir and Pálmi's children, Baugur succeeded in acquiring Hagkaup in 1998, with Jón Ásgeir as CEO, making him 'one of the most powerful businessmen in Iceland'. Following expansion of Bónus into the Faroe Islands in 1994, Baugur acquired a number of Icelandic retailers and expanded abroad: Nýkaup, Aðföng, Útilíf by 1998; and in 2001 Bill's Dollar Stores and Bonus Dollar Stores in the USA along with Topshop and a significant share in Arcadia Group in the UK. Baugur went on to buy and trade significant shares in the Big Food Group, at that time owner of Iceland Foods and Booker, House of Fraser, Somerfield, and Mothercare by 2003 and by 2008 French Connection, Oasis, Karen Millen, Whistles, Debenhams, Goldsmiths, Woolworths, and Moss Bros.

Jón Ásgeir has served as a board member in Iceland Foods Plc (chairman), Booker Plc, House of Fraser Plc, Hamleys, Magasin Du Nord (chairman), Oasis/Karen Millen, Whistles and All Saints.

In 1999, Jón Ásgeir took a major role in forming the consortium Orca with a view to acquiring the first Icelandic bank to be privatised, the investment bank Fjarfestingarbanki Atvinnulifsinns (FBA). FBA merged with Iceland's previous private bank, Íslandsbanki, in 2000; renamed Glitnir, Baugur's holdings in this bank gave Jón Ásgeir a key place in the Icelandic banking sector. He retired as CEO of Baugur Group in May 2002 and became chairman of the company, and then took back the CEO's chair in November the same year.

Meanwhile, in 2002, Jón Ásgeir acquired one of Iceland's two main newspapers, Fréttablaðið (via Gunnar Smari Egilsson), increasing his political influence.

At the end of 2003, Baugur Group had grown so much under the leadership of Jon Asgeir that no other Icelandic companies had equal activity abroad, and it was the largest company in Iceland. At the height of his success, 'Jon Asgeir and his wife, Ingibjörg Pálmadottir—owner of the boutique hotel 101 in Reykjavik and daughter of a retail magnate—owned a 145-foot yacht ... and a seven-thousand-square-foot apartment, complete with bulletproof panic room, on Gramercy Park in New York'. By autumn 2007, Baugur's holdings within Iceland, by its own reckoning, were worth around 100 billion krónur; and these accounted for only 35% of its activities.

Jón Ásgeir's career was marked by a mutual dislike between him and his critic Davíð Oddsson, one of the most powerful politicians in Iceland. While it is not clear to precisely what extent Davíð Oddsson's personal dislike of Jón Ásgeir was the cause of interventions by the state and judiciary in Jón Ásgeir's activities, there is little doubt that there was some relationship. In the analysis of Davíð's close associate Hannes Hólmsteinn Gissurarson,

Jón Ásgeir Jóhannesson ... became the most powerful man in Iceland ... after his critic, Davíð Oddsson, stepped down as Prime Minister. The market capitalism of 1991–2004 was transformed into the crony capitalism of 2004–2008. Not only did Jón Ásgeir and his cronies control two-thirds of the retail business, they also owned almost all the private media and one of the three banks, while having good access to the other two banks. It did not seem to make any difference to opinion-makers that Jón Ásgeir was investigated, indicted and convicted for breaking the law on business practices, being given a three months suspended prison sentence.

== Role in the 2008–11 Icelandic financial crisis ==
At the end of September 2008, the bank Glitnir status became increasingly strained resulting in the government acquiring it by buying a 75% stake for 84 billion. Even so, it collapsed, and the government revoked its purchase. According to The Report of the Investigation Commission of Althing into the 2008 crash, 'the company which was most extensively in business with the Icelandic banks was Baugur Group and related parties. He borrowed in total, more than a billion dollars from all three national Icelandic banks: Glitnir, Kaupþing, and Landsbanki' After attempts to keep Baugur Group afloat, the Reykjavík District Court declared Baugur Group bankrupt on 11 March 2009. Ímmediately after the crash, Jón Ásgeir Jóhannesson and his companies alone owed more than a thousand billion ISK, between 70 and 80 per cent of the country's GDP'.

== Criminal charges and convictions ==
- On 17 August 2005 Jón Ásgeir and others were charged with 40 violations of the law regarding accounting. Most offenses regards transfers between himself and the company. The Supreme Court referred the case back to the District Court of Reykjavík in autumn 2005 because of procedural errors.
- On 3 May 2007, Johannesson was found guilty on a single charge of a breach of book-keeping rules, with the conviction being upheld on appeal on 6 June 2008. Johannesson was given a 3-month suspended prison sentence. It also left his position as chairman uncertain under Icelandic law because the conviction meant that he could not serve on any company board for 3 years. As a consequence of this, and the fact that much of Baugur's portfolio was now based in the UK, in July 2008 Baugur considered relocating to the UK, where Johannesson could keep his board position.
- In February 2013, he was sentenced in a tax fraud case to 12 months in prison, suspended, and fined for ISK62m, €400.000. This ruling was overruled by The European Court of Human Rights in May 2017.

Jón Ásgeir has also been charged by the Office of the Special Prosecutor in connection with his role in the financial crisis, but as of June 2017 he has been cleared two times in the same case. That case is waiting for Supreme Court for final decision.

=== Violation of Jon Asgeir´s human rights ===
On 18 May 2017 The European Court of Human Rights found the Icelandic government guilty of violating Jon Asgeir's human rights by punishing him twice for the same act. That violated 7th Protocol of The European Convention on Human Rights.

== Appearances in popular culture ==
Jón Ásgeir is the main protagonist of Óttar M. Norðfjörð's satirical 2007 book Jón Ásgeir & afmælisveislan ([Reykjavík]: Sögur, 2007) and appears in Þráinn Bertelsson's satirical crime novel Valkyrjur as the owner of the supermarket chain Mínus, himself called Magús Mínus (Reykjavík: JPV, 2005). In 2010, Time magazine named him as one of their hundred most influential people in the world for his role in the Icelandic crash.

Jóhannesson was mentioned at the beginning of the 2010 documentary film Inside Job.

In 2020 Einar Kárason published a book Málsvörn Jóns Ásgeirs Jóhannessonar (Jon Asgeir's defense) about how Jón Ásgeir built up his business empire and his struggle with the authorities in Iceland.

== See also ==
- Baugur Group
- Glitnir
