= List of supermarket chains in Iceland =

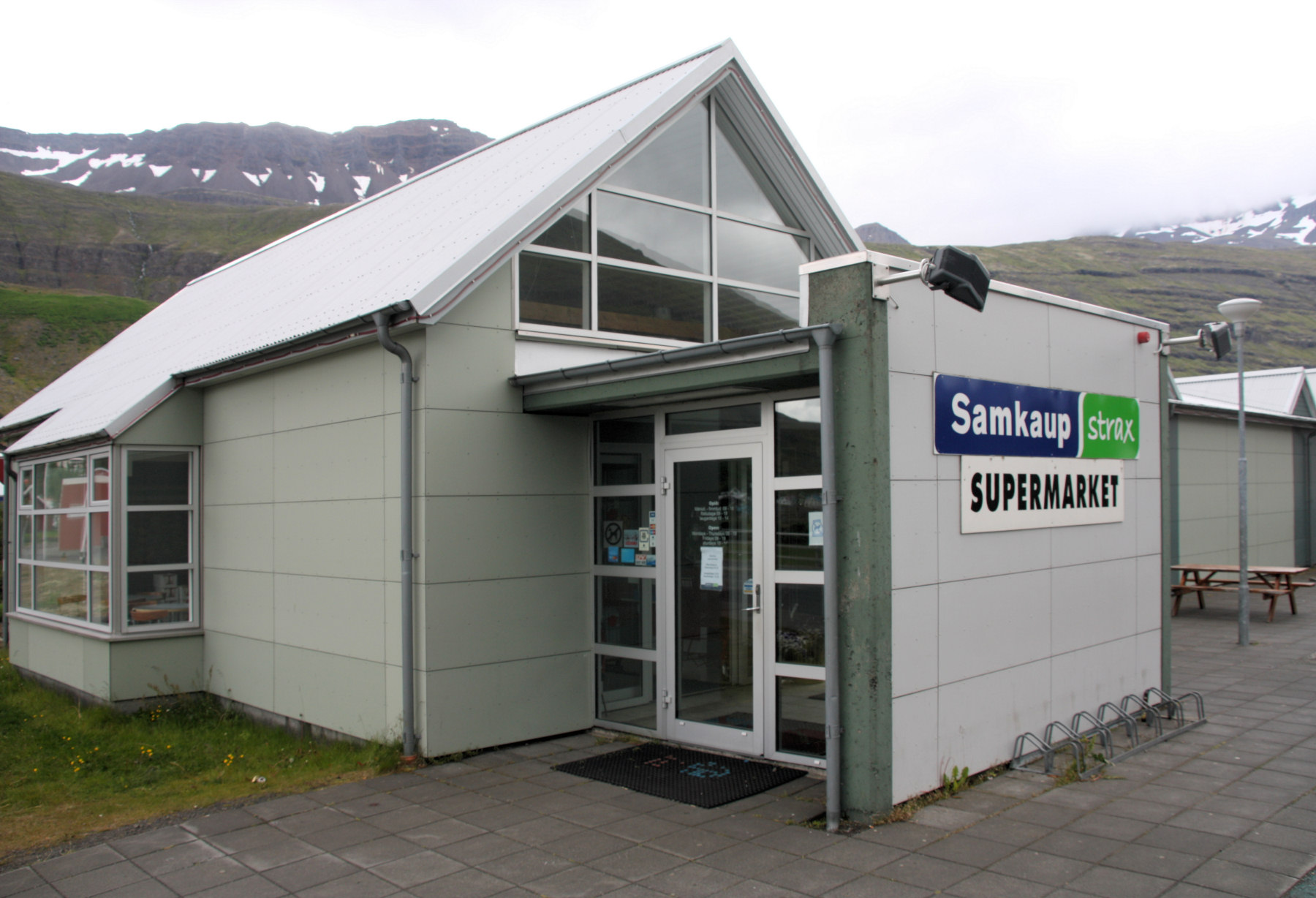
Samkaup Strax in Seyðisfjörður

Name	Stores	Type of store	Parent
10-11	3	convenience	SKEL ehf.
Bónus	33	discount	Hagar hf.
Costco	1	hypermarket	Costco Wholesale
Euro-Market	3	convenience	none
Hagkaup	8	department store	Hagar hf.
Krónan	26	discount	FESTI hf.
Kjarval	2	convenience	FESTI hf.
Stórkaup	1	big box store	Hagar hf
Iceland	6	convenience	Samkaup ehf.
PRIS.	2	convenience	SKEL ehf.
Mini Market	3	convenience	none
Krambúðin	21	convenience	SKEL ehf.
Nettó	15	discount	SKEL ehf.
Samkaup Strax	1	convenience	SKEL.
Kjörbúðin	15	convenience	SKEL ehf.
Extra	3	convenience	SKEL ehf.
