= Baugur Group =

Icelandic company founded in 1989

Baugur Group hf
- Type: Private
- Industry: Retailer, Real estate
- Founded: Reykjavík, Iceland (1998)
- Fate: Administration
- Headquarters: Reykjavík, Iceland
- Key people: Jón Ásgeir Jóhannesson, CEO
- Products: Retailer, Investment company
- Website: www.baugur.is

Baugur Group (/ˈbaʊɡər/; Icelandic: [ˈpœyːɣʏr̥]) was an Icelandic investment company. The group began as a supermarket and general retail company in Iceland, before diversifying to own a number of businesses at its peak, primarily in the United Kingdom.

Baugur was heavily affected by the Icelandic financial crisis that began in 2008, and applied for bankruptcy protection in February 2009. Its largest creditor Landsbanki applied to place Baugur's UK arm, BG Holdings, into administration that month. The group filed for bankruptcy in March 2009.

== History ==
In 1989, the Baugur Group was started by the opening of a single 'Bónus' supermarket in Reykjavík by Jón Ásgeir Jóhannesson and his father, Jóhannes Jónsson. The company grew quickly and within three years was operating several supermarkets in Iceland. In 1992, Hagkaup, the leading domestic retailer, acquired 50% of shares in Bonus. In 1993, they merged and formed a joint purchasing company named Baugur.

Hagkaup was established over 50 years ago and, as a retailing pioneer, opened both supermarkets and department stores in Iceland. Hagkaup and Bonus merged as Baugur in 1998 and Jón Ásgeir Jóhannesson became the company's President and CEO. Baugur was listed on Iceland Stock Exchange the same year.

In 1999, Baugur signed franchise agreements with the Arcadia Group and Debenhams for Scandinavia and today Hagar, (formerly Baugur-Iceland) runs several Topshop and Miss Selfridge stores in Iceland and Sweden as well as three Debenhams stores.

=== Baugur changes to Baugur Group ===
In 2002, proposals were approved concerning a change in the name of Baugur hf. to Baugur Group hf. and changes to the company's organizational structure.

Baugur hf. was divided into three independent profit centres: Baugur-Iceland, Bonus Stores Inc., and Baugur-ID. Baugur hf. changed its name to Baugur Group hf. and became a holding company.

=== Baugur Group delisted from ICEX ===
In May 2003, a redemption offer worth 10.85 Icelandic krónur (£0.09) was made by Mundur, for the outstanding stock—Mundur holding company is backed by Gaumur, KB Banki, an Icelandic investment bank; and two private investors—and in July 2003, Baugur Group was delisted from the Iceland Stock Exchange.

The year 2003 was a milestone in Baugur Group's foreign operations. At the beginning of the year, Baugur Group held shares in a few listed companies in Britain, whereas, at the end of the year, it was the most internationally extensive Icelandic company.

Briefly, it can be said that Baugur Group's investment activities in Britain can be split into two categories. On one hand, Baugur Group continued to invest in listed companies that are regarded to have better futures, either because their current management is in the process of improving the company's operation, or because new shareholders are expected to step in to instigate improvement. Among the companies, which Baugur Group has invested in on these premises are the Big Food Group, House of Fraser, and Somerfield.

On the other hand, Baugur Group has formed a strategy to take part in management takeovers. These companies control strong brand names and are considered to have substantial opportunities for growth, show a net profit, and management has shown and proven its ability to succeed. During the year 2003, Baugur Group acquired three such companies: Hamleys, Oasis, and Julian Graves.

In May 2004, Baugur Group, along with other investors, acquired the majority in the British jewellery chain Goldsmiths, in cooperation with the company's management, for the amount of ISK 14.4 billion. Goldsmiths, which was established in Newcastle upon Tyne in the year 1778, operates 165 jewellery stores in Britain and is the second largest in the country in its sector.

In June 2004, the founders of Karen Millen agreed to sell the business to the Oasis Group (controlled by Baugur Group) in a deal valued at £120 million, creating a leading womenswear retailer with four strong brands—Oasis, Coast, Karen Millen, and Whistles; creating a group with over £350 million in sales in 550 stores.

Oasis is aimed at independent, fashion-conscious 18- to 30-year-old women and operates from 281 outlets across 14 countries, including the Republic of Ireland, the UK and France; Coast is a destination brand for women's special occasion clothes with 135 outlets; Karen Millen has a niche position away from the mass market, bordering on the designer brands; and Whistles has more-grown-up styling and quirkier taste than the rest of the high street. Later, the Oasis Group changed its name to Mosaic, listed on the ICEX.

=== Accounting irregularities ===
In 2002 Baugur's headquarters were the subject of a police raid. In July 2005 company founders Jón Ásgeir Jóhannesson and Jóhannes Jónsson were charged on 40 counts including tax and accounting irregularities, fraud and embezzlement. Jón Ásgeir Jóhannesson has accused the then prime minister, Davíð Oddsson of orchestrating a vendetta against him. The case became known in Icelandic as the 'Baugsmálið' ('Baugur case').

On 3 May 2007, Jón Ásgeir was found guilty on a single charge of a breach of book-keeping rules, with the conviction being upheld on appeal on 6 June 2008. Jón Ásgeir was given a 3-month suspended prison sentence. It also left his position as chairman uncertain under Icelandic law because the conviction meant that he could not serve on any company board for 3 years. As a consequence of this, and the fact that much of Baugur's portfolio was now based in the UK, in July 2008 Baugur considered relocating to the UK, where Jón Ásgeir could keep his board position.

=== Demise and collapse ===
It emerged in October 2008 that BDO Stoy Hayward was advising Baugur on restructuring and that Philip Green, the owner of Bhs and the Arcadia Group had travelled to Iceland for negotiations regarding him making an investment in Baugur, amid reports the group was on the brink of collapse

On 4 February 2009, Baugur applied for protection from its creditors after restructuring negotiations with Landsbanki broke down. The bank also applied for Baugur's UK arm to be put into administration.

== Ownership and links to Russia ==
In December 2002 Gaumur Holding acquired a 30.97% stake in Baugur Group.

Luxembourg-registered Gaumur Holding was originally Compagnie Financiere pour l'Atlantique du Nord. The company was registered on 22 June 1998. In March 2000 changed its name to Gaumur Holding.

Official records show that Gaumur Group had three shareholders:

- Starbook International Limited (P.O. Box 3186 Road Town, Tortola, British Virgin Islands)
- Waverton Group Limited (P.O. Box 3186 Road Town, Tortola, British Virgin Islands)
- Birefield Holdings Limited (P.O. Box 3186 Road Town, Tortola, British Virgin Islands)

In 2005 Danish media reported that behind Starbook, Waverton and Birefield is Shapburg Limited (registered in the same mailbox 3186) and Quenon Investments Limited (registered in the same mailbox 3186). It was discovered that:

- Both companies owned a stake in Baugur Group.
- Both companies owned a stake in the Luxembourg-registered Compagnie Financiere Scandinave. A month after incorporation it was renamed the Scandinavian Holding and later Meidur S.A. (later Exista).
- Both companies owned a stake in Alrosa Finance in Luxembourg. Another shareholder was Russian state-owned diamond company ALROSA.
- Shapburg Limited owned a stake in Alfa Finance Holdings. Another shareholder was Alfa-Bank of Russia.

Icelandic businessmen Björgólfur Thor Björgólfsson, Björgólfur Guðmundsson and Magnús Þorsteinsson all came to London from Saint Petersburg, Russia where they did business in the beverage sector together.

== Former assets ==
- 365 - sold April 2008
- Arcticgroup
- Aurum
  - Goldsmiths
  - Mappin & Webb
  - Watches of Switzerland
- Booker Group - sold June 2008.
- Scandinavian Design & Retail
- Steinunn
- Matthew Williamson
- Day Birger et Mikkelsen
- Souk
- eCommera
- Saks
- French Connection
- Iceland supermarket
- Wyevale Garden Centres
- Hamleys
- Magasin du Nord department store (83% with Straumur Investment Bank and B2B Holdings)
- Visual Communications Group
- Illum department store
- Jane Norman - bought 29 July 2007 for £117m; filed for bankruptcy administration 27 June 2011
- Julian Graves - sold to Holland & Barrett in September 2008.
- All Saints
- Debenhams (13%)
- Hagar - sold back to Johannesson family in July 2008.
- House of Fraser - (35%)
- FL Group - sold April 2008
- Hjálmur - sold April 2008
- Humac - sold April 2008
- Merlin - sold to Árdegi in June 2007.
- MK One - sold to restructuring specialist Hilco in May 2008.
- Moss Bros - Baugur sold its 28.5% shareholding sold to Arcadia Group in November 2008
- Mosaic Fashions (49%) (entered administration on 2 March 2009)
- Newsedge - sold April 2008
- Saga Film - sold April 2008
- Somerfield (3%) - The Co-operative Group bought the entire Somerfield chain in July 2008. Baugur made an unsuccessful attempt to buy Somerfield in 2005
- Teymi - sold April 2008
- Woolworths Group plc (12.4%). Share trading suspended 26 November 2008, with retail chain Woolworths and distribution arm Entertainment UK being placed into administration.
- Whistles - Sold to Jane Shepherdson in January 2008
- Whittard of Chelsea - Placed into administration on 23 December 2008, and subsequently sold to EPIC private equity.
- Woodward Foodservice - Sold to Brake Bros Ltd in August 2008
- Wyndeham Press Group - Sold to Walstead Investments Limited in December 2008.

== Board of directors ==
- Hans Christian Hustad
- Hreinn Loftsson (Chairman)
- Gudrún Pétursdóttir (Alternate Board Member)
- Kristín Jóhannesdóttir
- Þórður Bogason (Secretary of the Board)
- Ingibjörg Stefanía Pálmadóttir
- Jóhannes Jónsson
- Einar Thór Sverrisson - Alternate Board Member
