= Troubadour Goods =

- Industry: Fashion accessory
- Founder: Samuel Bail and Abel Samet
- Headquarters: London, United Kingdom
- Key people: Samuel Bail
- Website: troubadourgoods.com

Troubadour Goods is a London-based sustainable company that designs and produces bags and accessories.

== History ==
Troubadour Goods was founded by Samuel Bail and Abel Samet in 2011. Creative director Samantha Jacob joined the company in 2015 after previously working with Whistles and Anya Hindmarch. Initially focused on accessories for men, the company launched its first women's collection in spring 2019.

== Sustainability ==
As a B Corp certified company, Troubadour uses fluorocarbon-free waterproofing and DriTan leather tanning technology to reduce water and chemical use in the manufacturing process. In 2023, the company launched the "Orbis Circular Collection," a line crafted with 100% recycled materials.

== Reception ==
In 2013, The Wall Street Journal described Troubadour’s bags as "discreet and stylish." In a review, Wirecutter wrote, "The Apex 3.0 Backpack stands out with its handsome styling, ergonomic design, and thoughtful details." The Apex Backpack from Troubadour was named the "best laptop backpack" by The New York Times' Wirecutter in December 2022. The Daily Telegraph called Troubadour's Apex 3.0 the Best City Backpack in its review. Forbes praised the Orbis Circular Collection for its approach to sustainability.

== Awards ==
- In 2023, Troubadour Goods won Marie Claire UK Award for sustainability
- In 2023, Troubadour won the ISPO Award at the ISPO sports trade fair organized by Messe München.
- In 2024, Troubadour was named a finalist in the Drapers Sustainable Fashion Awards.
- In 2024, Troubadour Goods received the Glossy Award for the "Breakthrough Product Innovation" category
- In 2024, Troubadour received the Red Dot Design Award for its user-friendly product-line .
