= Grape Tree =

British health store chain

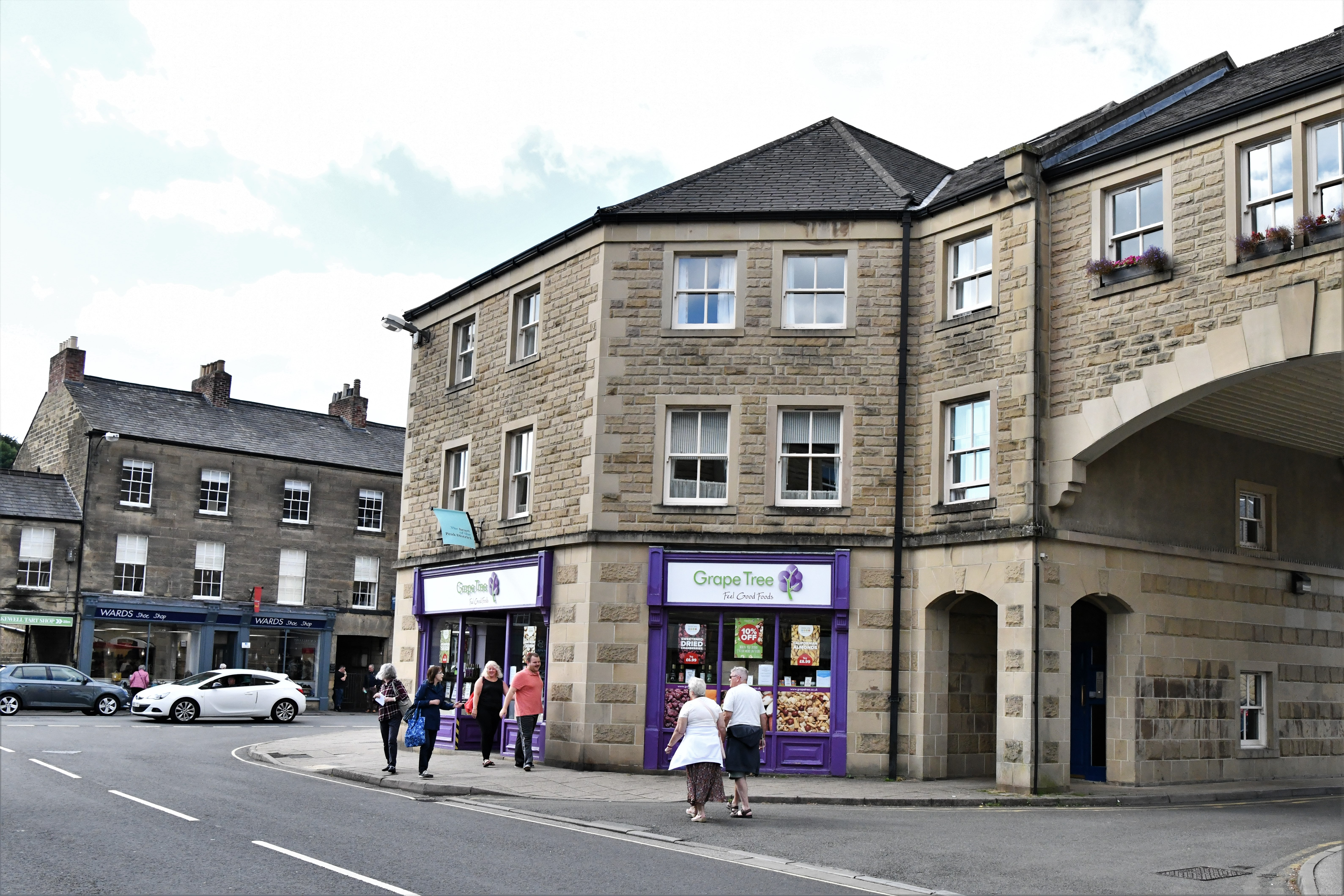
Grape Tree in Bakewell in 2021

Grape Tree is a chain of British health and wholefoods stores.

== History ==
Grape Tree was founded in 2013 by Nick Shutts, after he sold the Julian Graves health store brand, Julian Graves, to the parent company of Holland & Barrett. As of September 2026, the chain operated approximately 200 locations.

=== E. coli recall ===
In May 2025, Grape Tree recalled some macadamia nuts because of possible E. coli.
