= Maconie =

Maconie is a surname. Notable people with the surname include:

- Kat Maconie (born 1984), American footwear designer
- Robin Maconie (born 1942), New Zealand composer, pianist, and writer
- Stuart Maconie (born 1960), English radio DJ, television presenter, writer, music critic, and journalist
