= Jóhannes Jónsson =

Icelandic businessman (1940–2013)

- Born: 31 August 1940; Reykjavík
- Died: 27 July 2013 (aged 72)
- Occupation: Businessman
- Known for: Co-founder of Bónus stores and Baugur Group

Jóhannes Jónsson (31 August 1940 – 27 July 2013) was an Icelandic businessman and one of the founders of the investment company Baugur Group, which applied for bankruptcy protection in February 2009. His warm public personality and co-founding of the supermarket chain Bónus led him to be known as Jói í Bónus.

== Early life ==
Jóhannes's parents were Jón Elías Eyjólfsson, a store manager at the Sláturfélag Suðurlands in Reykjavík (1916-2001) and Kristín Fanney Jóhannesdóttir, a housewife and also an employee of the Sláturfélags Suðurlands (1918-2012). Jóhannes had a sister, Ester (1947-), who married Einar Vilhjálmsson (1947-). Jóhannes married Ása Karen Ásgeirsdóttir (1942-), who also worked at the Sláturfélag. They had two children: Kristín (1963-) and Jón Ásgeir (1968-). Subsequently he married Guðrún Þórsdóttir (1961-).

Jóhannes began working at a young age for his father in the food section of the Sláturfélag Suðurlands, later becoming the shop manager there for two decades. He had studied printing, but never worked in this profession. He 'was not part of the Reykjavik elite, having no prime minister in his bloodline, no link to one of the well-cushioned Octopus families. He had trained in a slaughterhouse and was a grocer in a supermarket chain'.

== Business empire ==
Made redundant in 1987, he founded the Bónus stores in Iceland in 1989 with his son and president of Baugur Group, Jón Ásgeir Jóhannesson.

In 2012, he opened an Iceland branch of the UK supermarket chain Iceland in collaboration with the company's founder Malcolm Walker.

He died of cancer on 27 July 2013.
