= Shepherdson =

Shepherdson is a surname. Notable people with the surname include:

- Arunah Shepherdson Abell (1806–1888), American publisher
- Ella Shepherdson, missionary in Australia whose name was given to Shepherdson College on Elcho Island, Northern Territory
- Guy Shepherdson (born 1982), Australian rugby player
- Harold Shepherdson (1918–1995), English football player and coach
- Jane Shepherdson (born 1961), British businesswoman
- John Shepherdson (1926–2015), British logician
