= Watches of Switzerland =

British retailer of Swiss watches

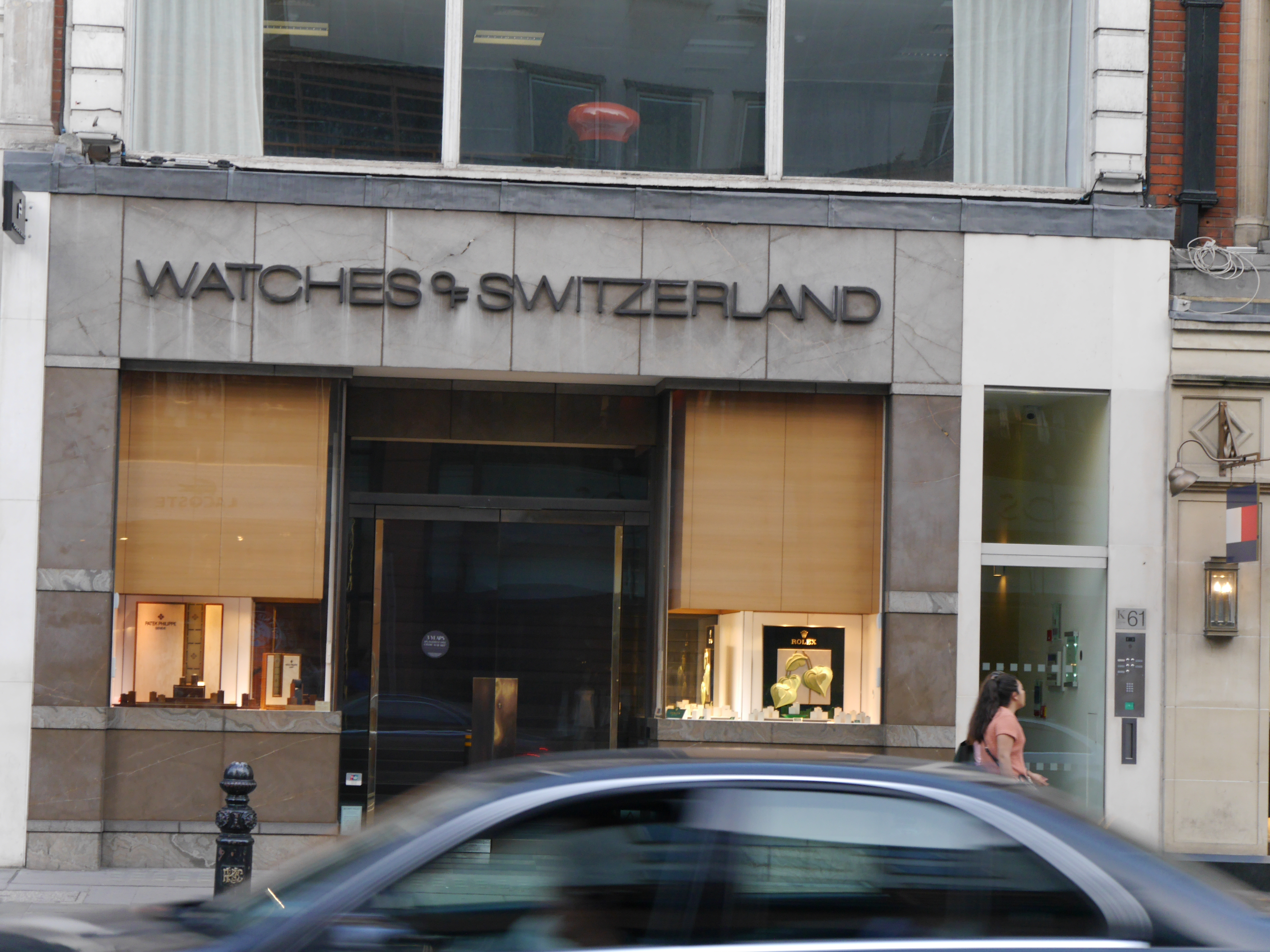
- Watches of Switzerland store in Brompton Road, London
- Type: Public limited company
- Traded as: LSE: WOSG; FTSE 250 component
- Industry: Watches and jewellery
- Founded: 1924
- Headquarters: Braunstone, England, UK
- Key people: Ian Carter, (Chairman); Brian Duffy, (CEO)
- Revenue: ▲£1,827.9 million (2026)
- Operating income: ▲£170.0 million (2026)
- Net income: ▲£99.0 million (2026)
- Website: www.thewosgroupplc.com

Watches of Switzerland is a British retailer of watches. The company headquarters is in Braunstone, England. It is listed on the London Stock Exchange and is a constituent of the FTSE 250 Index.

== History ==
Watches of Switzerland was founded in Ludgate Hill in 1924. During the late 1970s Theo Paphitis, the entrepreneur, worked as a sales assistant at the Bond Street Watches of Switzerland store in London.

The business was acquired by Ratners in 1988 and then sold on to Asprey in 1992. In December 1998, Mappin & Webb managing director, Judith Pilkington, acquired Watches of Switzerland from Asprey, together with Mappin & Webb. Both companies were acquired by Baugur Group in November 2005. Baugur grouped both companies with fellow British jeweller Goldsmiths under the Aurum Group.

Baugur became insolvent and went into administration in early 2009 and the group was under the control of Landsbanki before coming under the control of Apollo Global Management in 2013. The group was briefly known as Aurum Holdings before re-branding itself as Watches of Switzerland Group in advance of an initial public offering on the London Stock Exchange in May 2019.

The company has expanded through a series of acquisitions including the purchase of Roberto Coin in the U.S. in May 2024, and the purchase of U.S. based retailer Deutsch & Deutsch. The company will continue to operate those stores under the Deutsch & Deutsch brand.

== Operations ==
The company operates 221 stores in the UK, US and Europe, spread across the Watches of Switzerland, Mappin & Webb, Goldsmiths, Mayors and Betteridge brands. This includes 96 dedicated mono-brand boutiques in partnership with Rolex, Omega, TAG Heuer, Breitling, Tudor, Audemars Piguet, Seiko, Bulgari and Fope.

== Awards and recognition ==
Watches of Switzerland secured its first Fair Tax Mark certification from the Fair Tax Foundation in 2022.
