= Whittard of Chelsea =

British chain of shops selling coffee, tea and related products

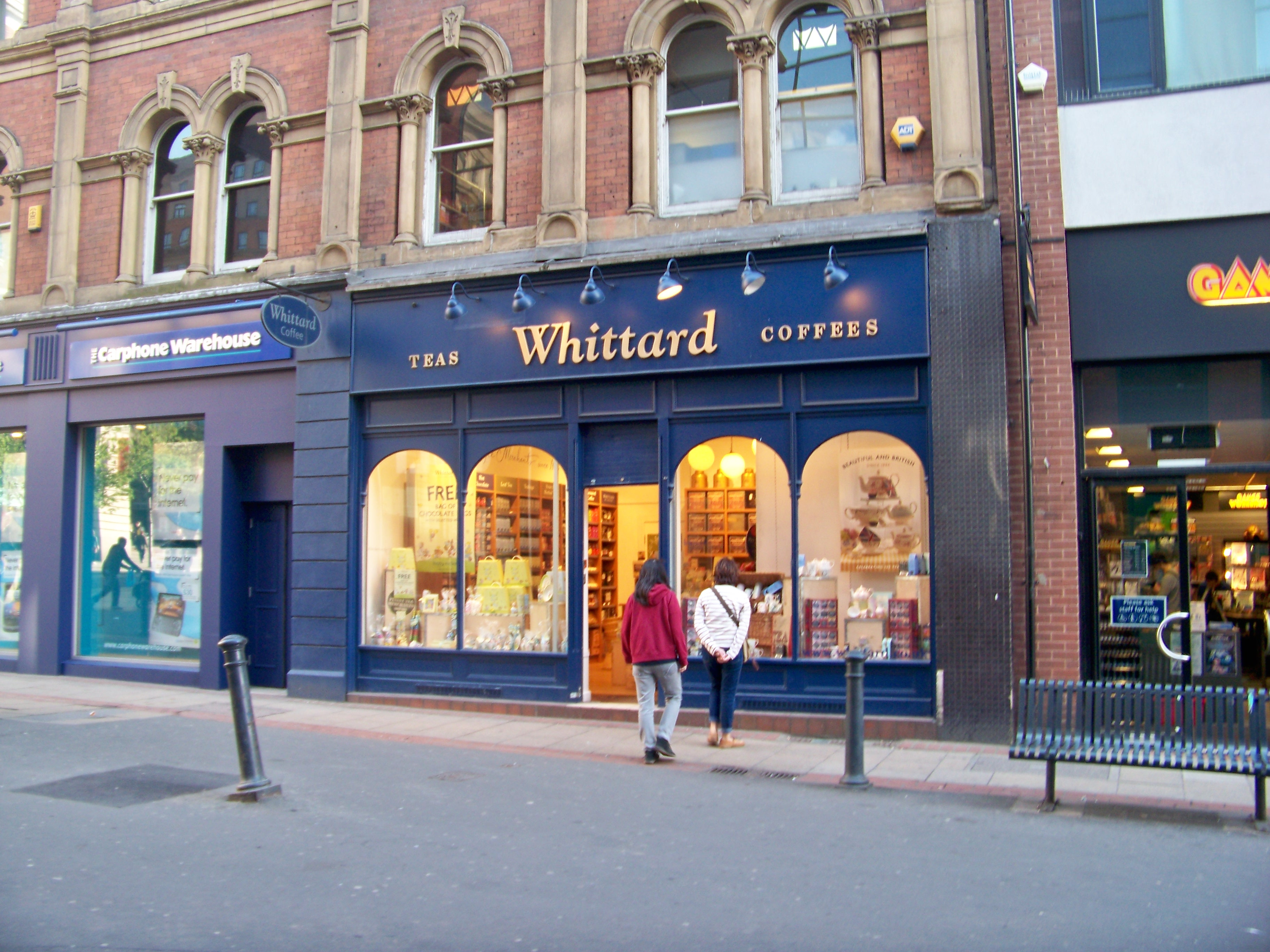
- A Whittard store on Lands Lane in Leeds
- Industry: Retail
- Founded: 1886; 140 years ago
- Founder: Walter Whittard
- Headquarters: Abingdon, Oxfordshire, England
- Number of locations: 41 locations (UK, 2025)
- Area served: 26 countries (Note: As of February 2026.): Australia; Austria; Belgium; Canada; Denmark; Finland; France; Germany; Greece; Hong Kong; Hungary; Republic of Ireland; Italy; Japan; South Korea; Malaysia; Netherlands; Norway; Portugal; Saudi Arabia; Spain; Switzerland; Taiwan; United Arab Emirates; United Kingdom; United States
- Products: tea, coffee, related products
- Owner: Epic Private Equity
- Website: whittard.co.uk

Whittard Trading Limited, trading as Whittard of Chelsea or simply Whittard, is a British chain of shops selling coffee, tea and related products. It was started by Walter Whittard in 1886, and remained in his family until 1973. In 1996 it was floated on the Alternative Investment Market, and expanded rapidly, building a chain of about 120 shops and several tea rooms. It went bankrupt in 2008; more than fifty of the shops were closed, and the company was restructured into private equity ownership. As of February 2026, Whittard has stores in 26 countries worldwide. The chain has more than fifty shops in the United Kingdom, and one in Taiwan.

== History ==
The company was started by Walter Whittard, who opened a tea shop in Fleet Street in 1886, and remained in his family until 1973. In 1996 it was floated on the Alternative Investment Market, and used some of the proceeds of the float to expand rapidly, building a chain of about 120 shops and several tea rooms. It made heavy losses in an attempt to establish an internet sales business, which was closed down in about 2001. After further financial difficulties, it was sold to the Baugur Group, an Icelandic investment company, in 2005 for about £21 million. In the year to the end of March 2007, Whittard reported a loss of £3.2 million. Baugur went bankrupt in the 2008–2011 Icelandic financial crisis, and Whittards also went into receivership. It was sold to Epic Private Equity for £600,000. More than fifty of the shops were closed, and the company was restructured.

In 2016 Whittard opened a tea-bar in its Covent Garden shop. As of February 2026, Whittard has stores in 26 countries, including: Australia, Austria, Belgium, Canada, Denmark, Finland, France, Germany, Greece, Hong Kong, Hungary, the Republic of Ireland, Italy, Japan, South Korea, Malaysia, the Netherlands, Norway, Portugal, Saudi Arabia, Spain, Switzerland, Taiwan, the United Arab Emirates, the United Kingdom, and the United States.
