= Iceland (supermarket) =

British supermarket chain

Iceland Foods Limited

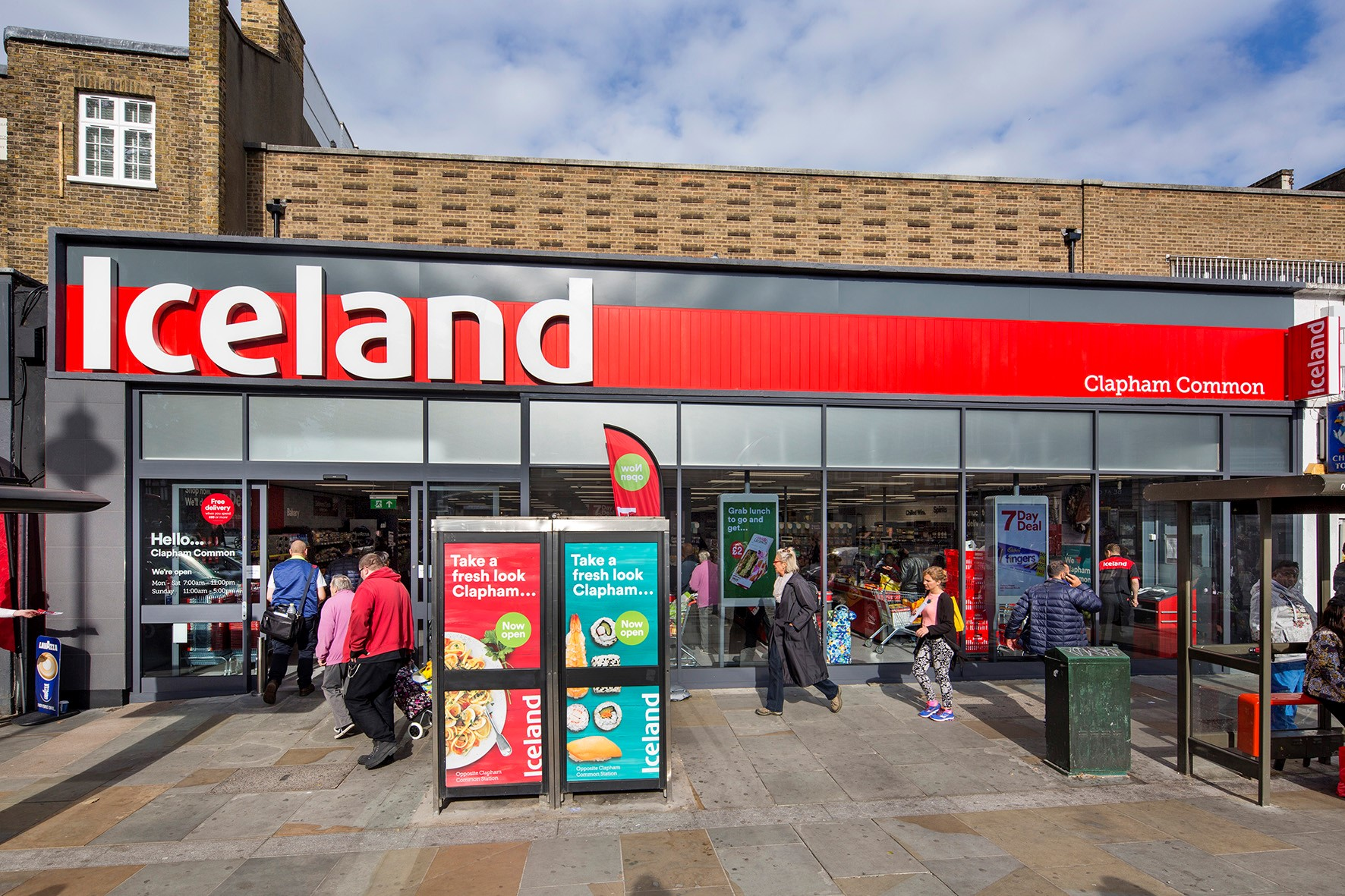
- An Iceland store in Clapham Common, London
- Trade name: Iceland
- Formerly: Iceland Frozen Foods plc (1973–2000); Iceland Foods plc (2000–2005)
- Type: Private
- Industry: Retailing
- Founded: 18 November 1970; 56 years ago in Oswestry, England
- Founder: Sir Malcolm Walker; Peter Hinchcliffe
- Headquarters: Deeside, Wales
- Number of locations: 1000+ (2020)
- Key people: Richard Walker; (Executive Chairman); Tarsem Dhaliwal; (Chief Executive Officer)
- Products: Frozen foods Groceries
- Revenue: ▼£3.555 billion (2022)
- Operating income: ▼£36.9 million (2022)
- Net income: ▼ —£3.6 million (2022)
- Number of employees: 28,853 (2022); 18,315 FTE (2022)
- Website: iceland.co.uk

Iceland Foods Limited, trading under both the Iceland and The Food Warehouse names, is a British supermarket chain headquartered in Deeside, Wales. Iceland was started as a frozen food retailer in 1970, before growing greatly during the 1980s, by purchasing smaller rivals before acquiring larger rival Bejam in 1989. After initially specialising in frozen goods, Iceland now sells a range of grocery products, with frozen accounting for approximately one third of their volume. Specialising in own label and exclusive brands, Iceland sells these through both their Iceland-branded stores and the larger format Food Warehouse stores.

== History ==
Iceland Foods began business in 1970, when Malcolm Walker opened the first store in Leg Street, Oswestry, Shropshire, England, with his business partner Peter Hinchcliffe. Together, they invested £60 for one month's rent at the store. They were still employees of Woolworths at the time, and their employment was terminated once their employer discovered their other roles. Iceland Foods initially specialised in loose frozen food. In 1977, they opened a store in Manchester selling own-labelled packaged food, and by 1978 the company had 28 stores.

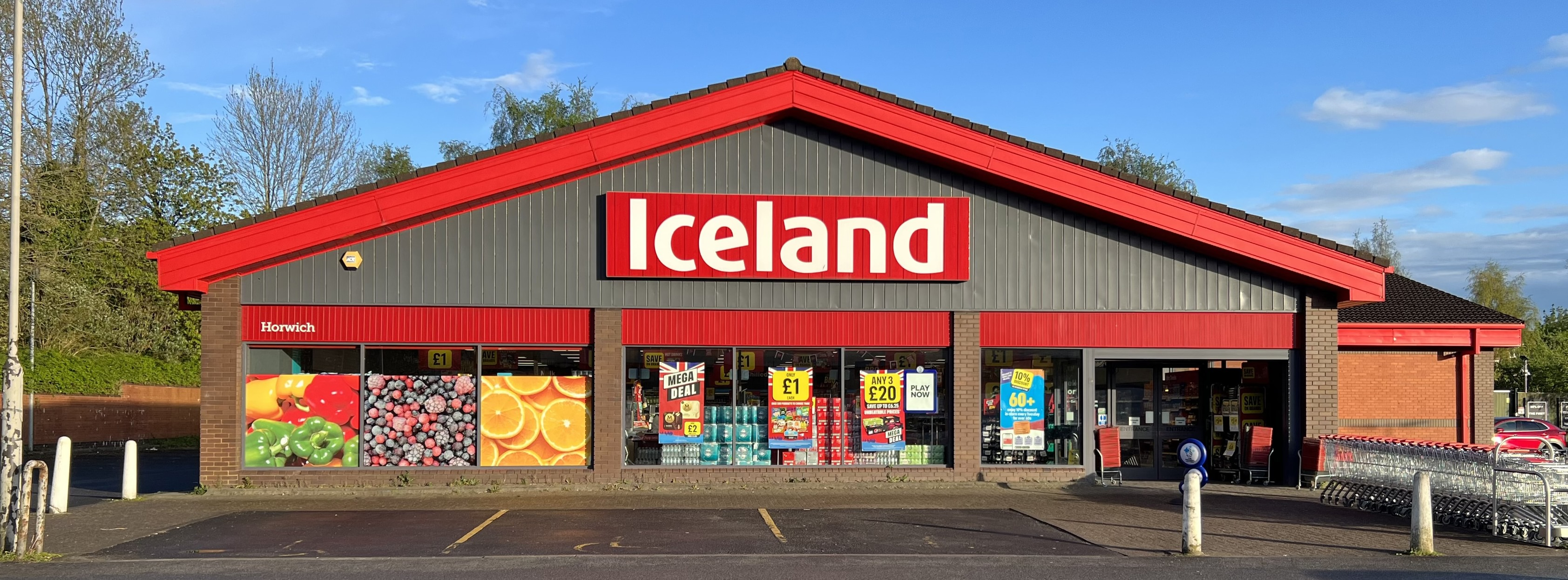
Iceland Horwich, Greater Manchester

In 1983, the business grew by purchasing the 18 stores of Bristol-based St. Catherine's Freezer Centres, and in 1984 the business went public for the first time. The cash investment was used to purchase 12 stores of South East-based Orchard Frozen Foods (who had gone into administration), AJ & M Freezer Foods, Fulham Freezer Foods and Igloo. The business purchased larger rival Bejam in 1989 after a hostile takeover bid. In 1993, the firm took over the food halls of the Littlewoods department store and also acquired the French Au Gel chain. This last move proved unsuccessful and the stores were dropped within a year.

Around 2000, the company attempted ties with British Home Stores. In May 2000, Iceland Foods merged with Booker plc, and Booker's Stuart Rose took the role of CEO of the merged company. He left for the Arcadia Group in November 2000 and was replaced by Bill Grimsey in January 2001.

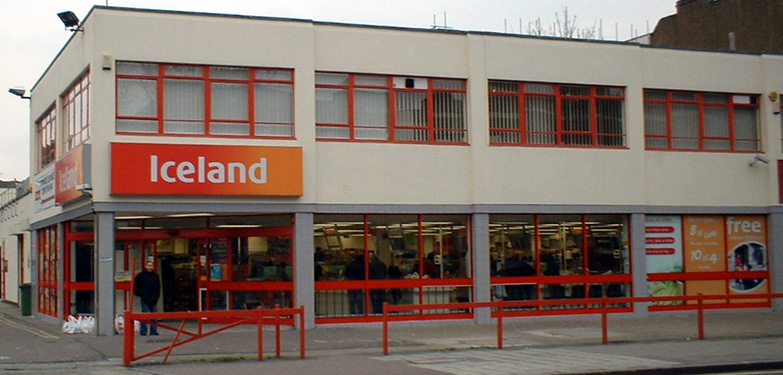
Iceland store on Camberwell Road, south London

Soon after Grimsey's appointment, Malcolm Walker, Iceland Foods's founder and chairman, was forced to stand down, as it was revealed that he had sold £13.5 million of Iceland Foods shares just five weeks before the company released the first of several profits warnings.

Iceland Foods' holding company was renamed the Big Food Group in February 2002, and attempted a refocus on the convenience sector with a bid for Londis. Grimsey remained until the takeover and demerger of the Big Food Group by a consortium led by the Icelandic company Baugur Group in February 2005. Walker subsequently returned to his previous role at Iceland Foods. Iceland Foods's website has a page critical of Grimsey's period in control.

After Baugur went into administration in 2009, a 77% stake in the firm came into the ownership of the Icelandic banks Landsbanki and Glitnir. In 2012 the stake was purchased by a consortium including Malcolm Walker and Graham Kirkham.

After Walker's return to the company, Iceland Foods reduced the workforce at the Deeside head office by 500, with approximately 300 jobs moved as a result of relocation of a distribution warehouse to Warrington.

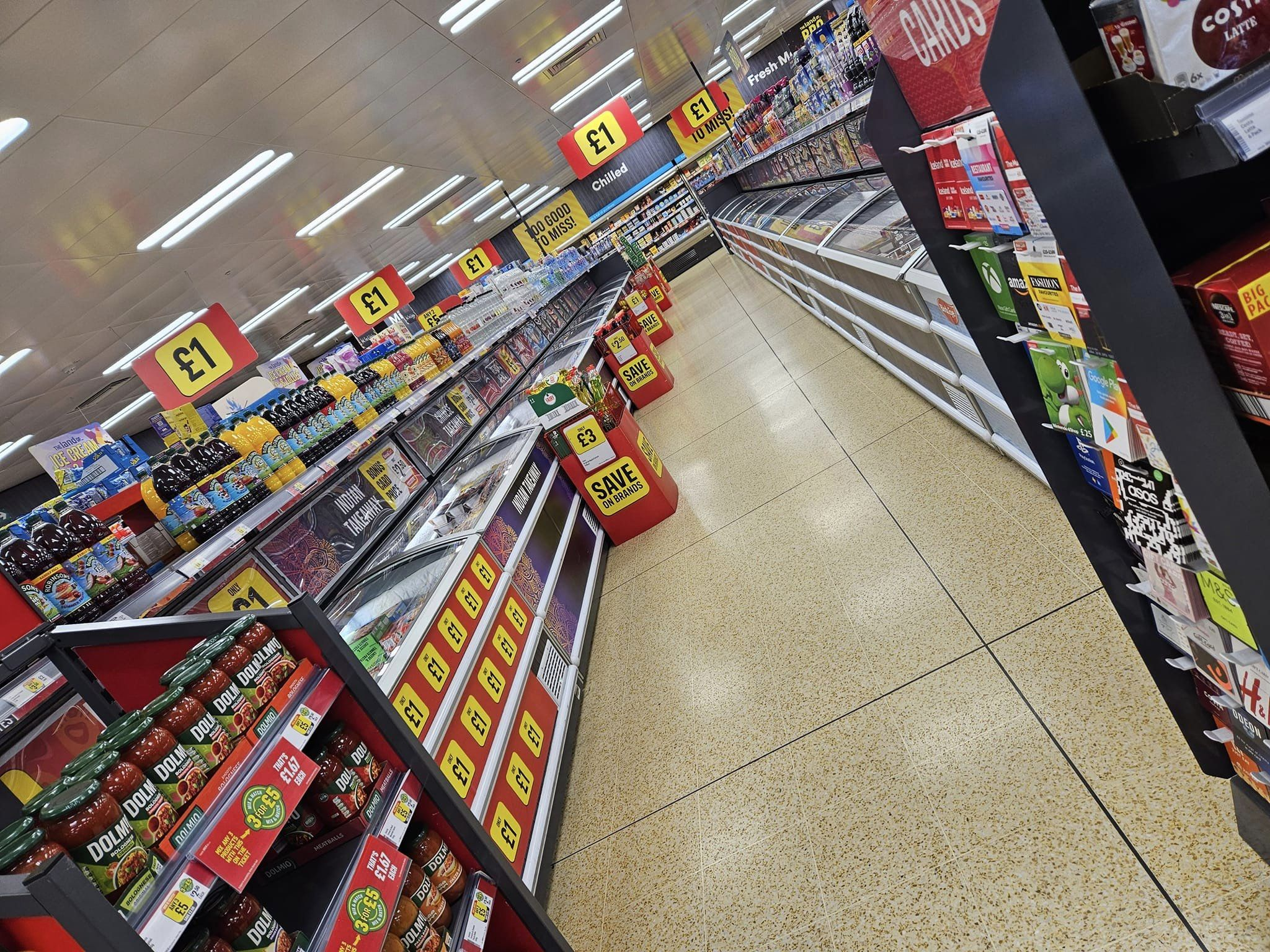
Interior of an Iceland supermarket in Horwich, Greater Manchester

In January 2009, Iceland Foods announced that it would buy 51 stores in the UK from the failed Woolworths chain, three days after the final 200 Woolworths stores closed their doors. In April 2009, Iceland Foods announced plans to close its appliance showrooms by September 2009 to concentrate on food retailing. Iceland Foods's sales for the year ended 27 March 2009 were £2.08 billion, a 16% increase on the previous year, with net profits of £113.7 million. An additional Iceland Foods store opened in Dudley town centre on 2 December 2010 in part of the former Beatties department store, 21 years after their initial departure from the town.

In 2013, two labs, one in Ireland and another in Germany, on behalf of the Irish state agency FSAI, identified 0.1% equine DNA in some Iceland Foods products. The Iceland chief executive, Malcolm Walker, was criticised by the FSAI for comments he made on a BBC Panorama programme in February 2013. He was asked why the products had passed British tests but failed the Irish ones. He replied, "Well, that's the Irish, isn't it?" He later apologised, stating he was deeply sorry if he caused offence.

In November 2013, the firm began selling appliances online again in partnership with DRL Limited. In May 2014, the firm reintroduced online shopping, which had been dropped in 2007.

In January 2018, Iceland Foods announced that it would end the use of plastic for all of its own-brand products by the end of 2023.

In 2019, Iceland Foods opened 45 new stores in the UK (including 31 larger stores under The Food Warehouse fascia) but had also closed eight, increasing the number of UK stores to 942. The company has a strategic alliance with The Range, where Iceland's food offer has been introduced to nine of the home and garden retailer's stores. In 2019 it also expanded its warehousing locations, adding five multi-temperature regional distribution centres at Livingston, Warrington, Deeside, Enfield and Swindon.

=== Dispute over the trademark "Iceland" ===
Iceland Foods Ltd has been accused by the government of Iceland of engaging in abusive behaviour by trademarking the name of the country, and of "harass[ing] Icelandic companies and even the Icelandic tourism board" by pursuing legal action against Icelandic companies which use the name of their country in their trading names. In November 2016, the Icelandic government filed a legal challenge at the European Union Intellectual Property Office (EUIPO) to have the company's trademark invalidated "on the basis that the term 'Iceland' is exceptionally broad and ambiguous in definition, often rendering the country's firms unable to describe their products as Icelandic". The Iceland Magazine noted that:

Iceland Foods was founded in 1970, but only acquired the Europe-wide trademark registration of "Iceland" in 2005. According to the Sagas Iceland, the nation was established in 874. It is an insult to common sense to maintain that the supermarket chain has a stronger claim to the trademark than the country.

In April 2019, the EUIPO invalidated the Iceland trademark. The EU's general court struck down an appeal in 2025, and this was welcomed by Þorgerður Katrín Gunnarsdóttir, Iceland's minister for foreign affairs.

== Domestic operations ==
Iceland has over 970 stores in the UK.

In 2006, a policy of "round sum pricing" was introduced, with many products priced in multiples of 25p.

2006 also saw a surge in home delivery promotion, which is now one of the main focuses of the company. When a customer spends £40 or more whilst shopping in-store, they have the option of free same-day home delivery, choosing from available timeslots. Customers can also shop online and receive free same-day or next-day home delivery when they spend more than £40.

In October 2008, Iceland Foods launched the Bonus Card, a loyalty card and replacement for the original home delivery card. It allows customers to save money onto the card, with the firm putting £1 onto the card each time a customer saves £20, and gives occasional discounts, offers, and entry to competitions—including their main competition, in which each month one Bonus Card holder from every store wins the entire cost of their shop.

=== The Food Warehouse ===
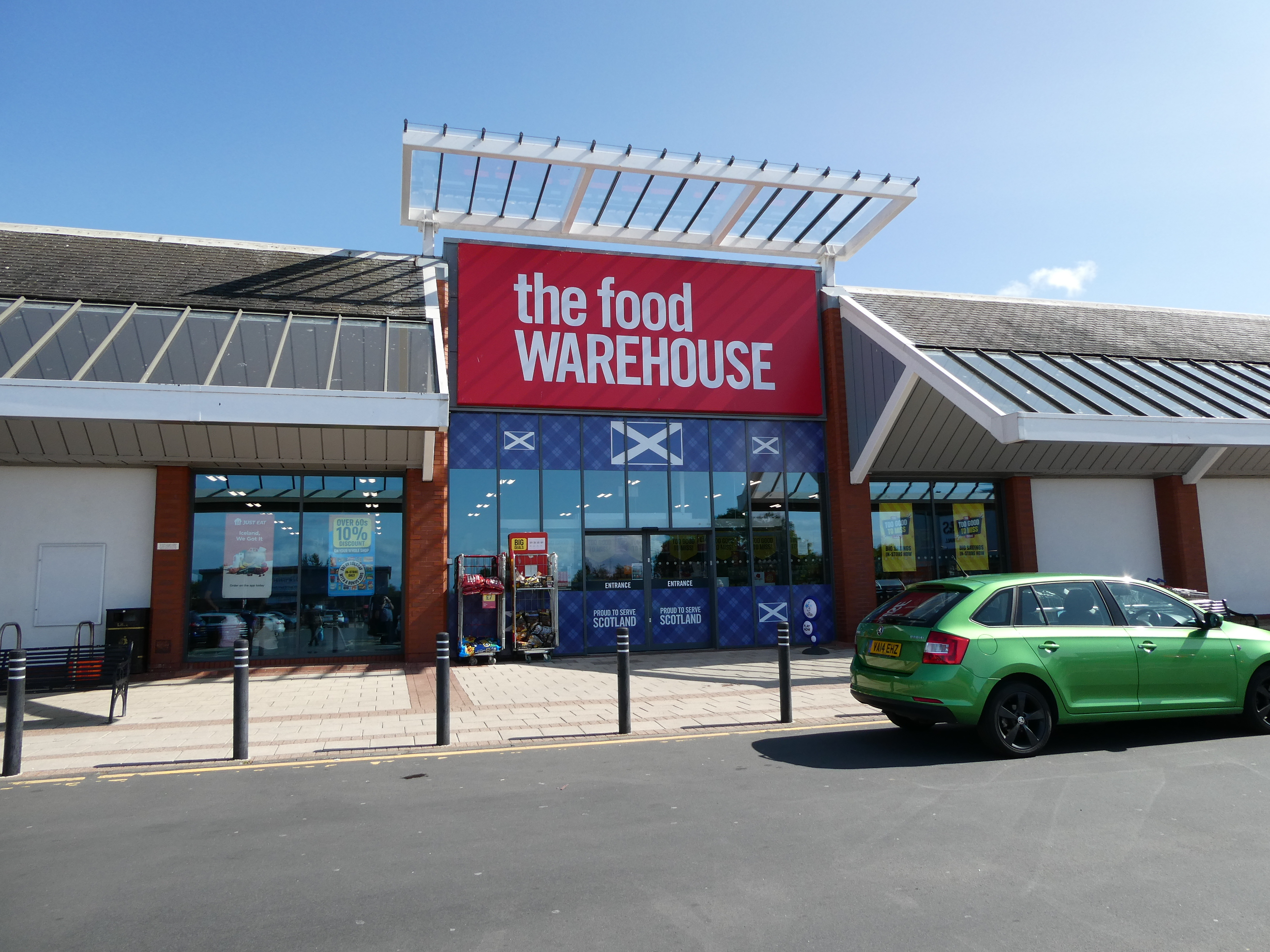
The Food Warehouse in Ayr, Scotland

In 2014, Iceland launched The Food Warehouse. These stores are typically larger than the main Iceland stores, sell bulk buying products and are usually in retail parks. In 2021, there were 140 locations of The Food Warehouse. In that year, The Food Warehouse was a priority in the Iceland Foods group because their stores had outperformed the Iceland stores.

At first, The Food Warehouse was the brand for Iceland's larger-format stores but by 2025 they had become a separate chain within the Iceland Foods group. A substantial and profitable part of The Food Warehouse is the home delivery service, with stores typically having several vans each and multiple delivery windows throughout the day for customers to choose from.

=== Swift ===
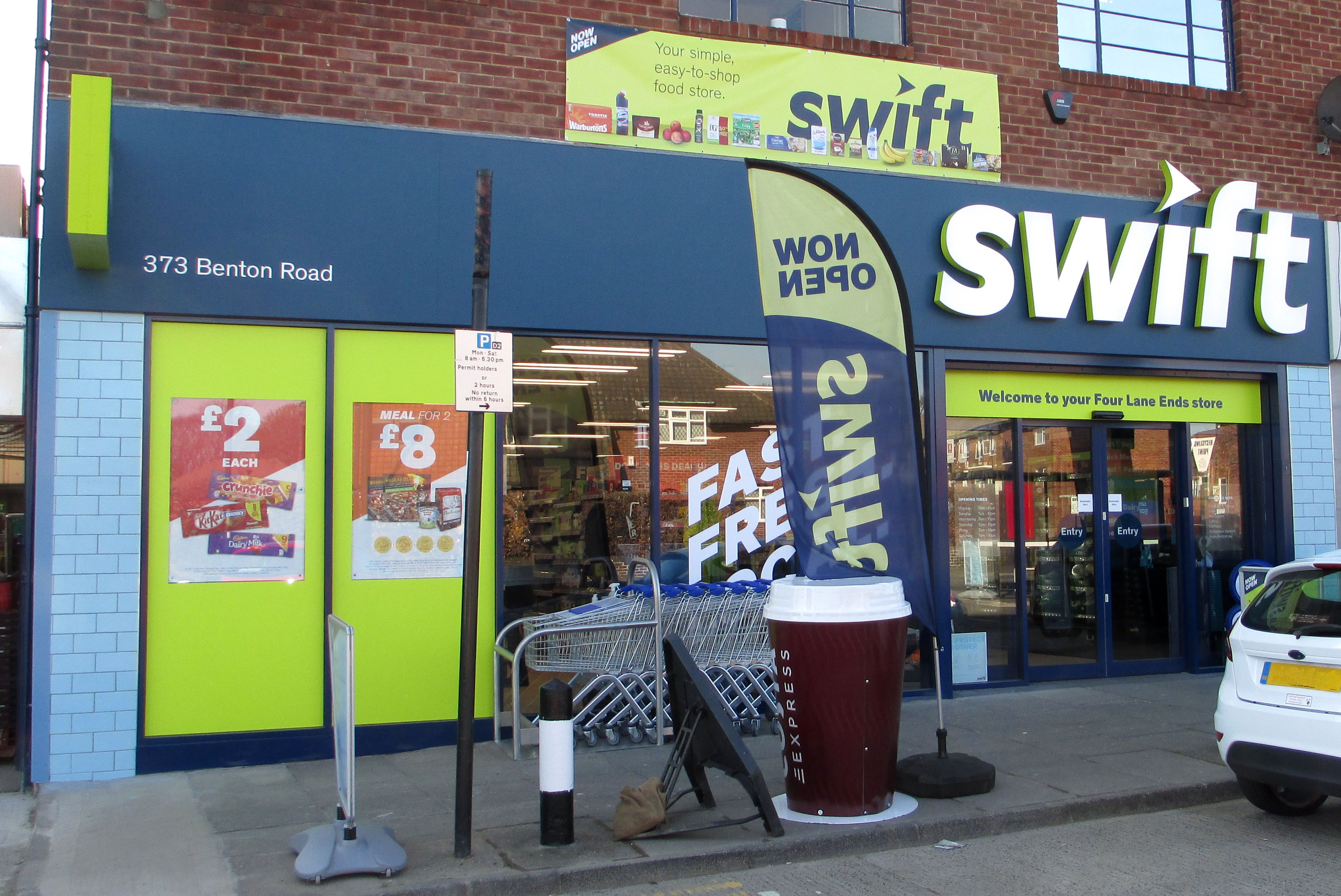
The first Swift store in Longbenton, Newcastle upon Tyne (2021)

In April 2021, Iceland launched Swift, their brand of convenience stores. Five stores were opened under the Swift brand, the first converted from a former Iceland store in Newcastle-upon-Tyne and the other four in the London area. Soon after introducing an Iceland Local format for petrol forecourt stores, Iceland announced in July 2023 that the Swift-branded stores would be scrapped, with four of the stores closed entirely, their staff transferred to other nearby Iceland stores, and one reformatted to the Iceland identity.

== International operations ==
=== Current ===
==== Channel Islands ====
Sandpiper CI previously operated six Iceland Foods franchise supermarkets in Jersey and four in Guernsey. In May 2024, Sandpiper sold all its supermarket operations, including the Iceland stores, to Morrisons; all were converted under their name shortly afterward.

In November 2024, Iceland signed a new franchise agreement with Alliance Supermarkets and opened the first Food Warehouse store outside the UK in Guernsey in January 2025, with new Iceland stores opening from March. On 15 July 2025, Iceland Foods launched an online service for shoppers in Jersey in partnership with local delivery platform Order It.

==== Iceland ====
In July 2012, in a joint venture with Jóhannes Jónsson, co-founder of Bónus and former Iceland owners Baugur Group, the firm opened a store in Kópavogur, Iceland, and subsequently in the capital, Reykjavík.

==== Ireland ====
In 1996, Iceland opened its first store outside the United Kingdom, in the Republic of Ireland. Later, eight stores operated, all in Dublin aside from one in Letterkenny. On 17 August 2005, Iceland announced it would close all its Irish locations amid the company's financial difficulties. The company stated that the Irish stores had been losing money for a while and they had seen no prospect of them becoming profitable in the future.

In November 2008, Iceland Foods re-entered the Irish market and opened a store in Ballyfermot in Dublin after agreeing a franchise deal with an Irish cash and carry company, AIM. In November 2009, a second Dublin store reopened in Finglas. In November 2013, Iceland acquired AIM's franchise stake in the Irish operations.

In February 2023, Iceland sold its Irish chain to The Project Point Technologies, who were expected to continue using the Iceland brand name under a franchise agreement. In June 2023, Metron Stores, trading as Iceland, was ordered to recall all imported meat products by the Food Safety Authority of Ireland, due to traceability concerns. On the 21st, Metron announced that they were unable to pay debts of up to €36m and the company was placed into examinership; several stores were closed on that day. On 8 September, Metron declared liquidation and closed all remaining stores with immediate effect.

Iceland returned to the Republic of Ireland in October 2024 under a partnership with retailer Dunnes Stores.

==== Iberia ====
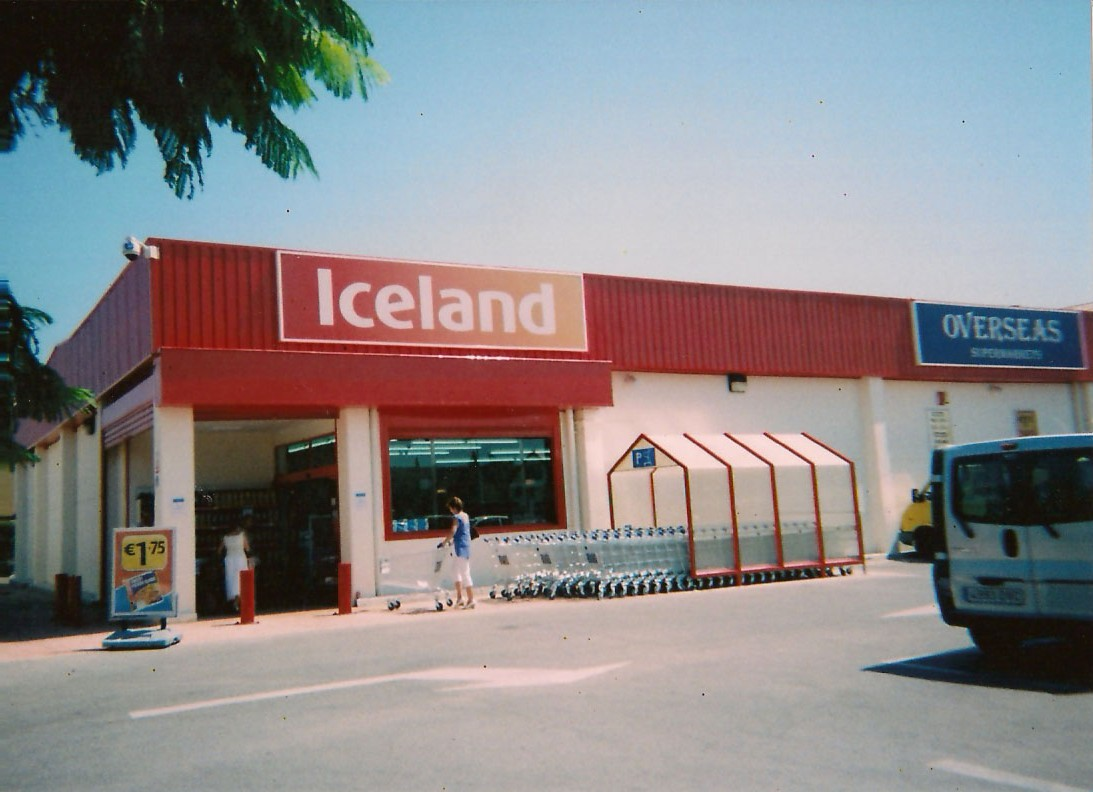
An Iceland store in Torrevieja, Spain

Iceland pre-sells food and products in Spain, Portugal and the Canary Islands to the Tenerife-based company Overseas Imports, which operates stores under the name The Food Co. (formerly Overseas Supermercados). These stores are in areas with substantial British communities.

The partnership between Iceland and Overseas began in 1997, with their first store opening in Las Chafiras the following year. While operating under the Iceland name, these stores operate as wholesalers rather than standard supermarkets. Overseas began a supply partnership with Waitrose in 2006, and in 2007 expanded to mainland Spain with a store in Mijas. The chain further expanded in 2011 to Portugal, opening a store in Guia.

By 2019, all Iceland stores began operating under the Overseas Supermercados brand, but continuing to supply Iceland food as before. In 2019, Overseas opened a new supermarket chain called The Food Co. in partnership with Tesco. As of 2026, all Overseas Supermercados stores operate as The Food Co., with food supplied from Iceland, Waitrose, and Tesco.

==== Malta ====
Via a franchise agreement with a local food importer and distributor, Iceland Foods operates in Malta. Initially, in 1998, it supplied only Iceland Foods-branded products to supermarkets, but in 2015 it opened stores in Birkirkara, followed by Mosta, Qawra and Marsascala in 2018. The Malta stores differ from those in the UK: there is a greater emphasis on non-frozen items, and stores feature fresh fruit, vegetables and bakery sections.

==== Scandinavia ====
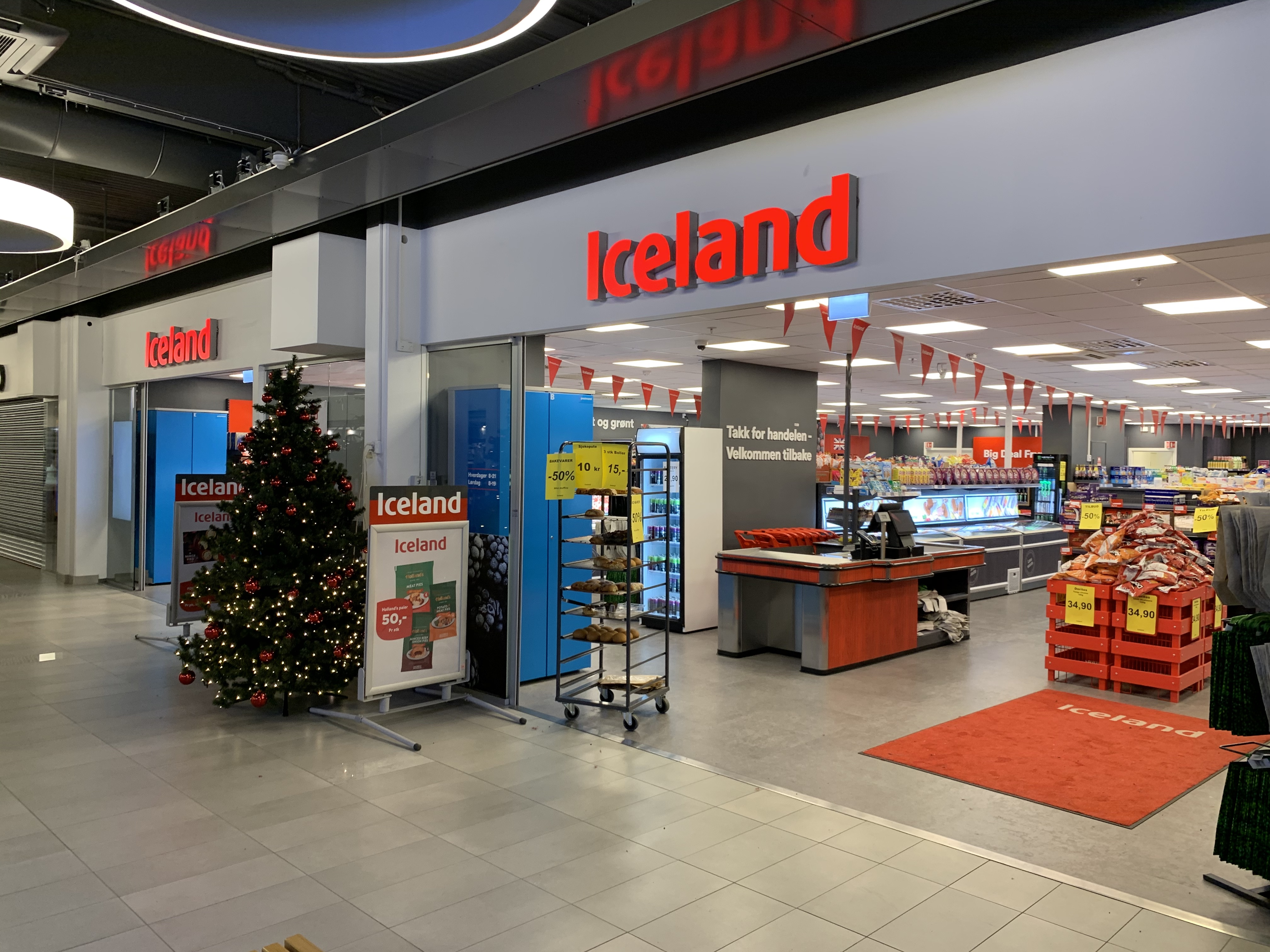
An Iceland store in Oslo, Norway

In May 2018, Iceland expanded to Norway by opening a store in Oslo, under a venture called Iceland Mat. The chain operated six stores until closing them between 2023 and 2024, deciding to focus on the distribution of Iceland products to retailers instead. In October 2024, Iceland Mat filed for bankruptcy after failing to pay its NOK 32.4 million debt.

In December 2024, Iceland entered into a joint-venture partnership with Iceland-based business Skel known as ICE JV EHF, which distributes Iceland's food products to retailers in Denmark, Finland, Norway, and Sweden.

==== South Korea ====
Iceland products were previously available in South Korea at Homeplus stores. In August 2026, the chain announced a new partnership with Lotte Mart to open Iceland-branded concessions.

=== Former ===
==== Czech Republic ====
Iceland entered the Czech Republic in January 2012 under a franchise deal with ICL Czech. 11 stores were operated under the brand.

In April 2022, reports were made of stores closing without prior notice, as well as the store's website going offline. In May, the chain declared bankruptcy and shuttered all remaining stores. ICL Czech blamed the COVID-19 pandemic and Brexit for the closure, stating that the pandemic harmed profitability while Brexit caused difficulty in importing products from the United Kingdom.

=== Planned Expansions ===
==== Alderney ====
In October 2026, Alliance will open the first Iceland store in Alderney.

==== Falkland Islands ====
In September 2026, Iceland announced a partnership with Falkland Islander retailer Kelper Stores Ltd, part of the Fortuna group, to open a store in the capital of Stanley in December 2026. This would make Iceland the first UK high street retailer to have a physical presence on the Falkland Islands.

== Advertising ==
Iceland Foods historically advertised with the slogan "Mums Love It", which was changed to "Are we doing a deal or are we doing a deal?" and "Feel the deal" in the early 2000s. From the mid-2000s ads featuring Kerry Katona saw a return to a slogan more traditionally associated with Iceland Foods – "So that's why mums go to Iceland!" Katona was dropped as the face of Iceland Foods in 2009 after a tabloid newspaper published pictures allegedly showing her taking cocaine. She was succeeded by Coleen Nolan, Ellie Taylor, Stacey Solomon and Jason Donovan, who has also frequently appeared in the company's Christmas advertisement campaigns. Peter Andre became face of the firm in 2014.

The current main tagline is the truncated "That's why mums go to Iceland". Storefronts also bear the tagline "food you can trust", and carrier bags in stores bear the tagline "the frozen food experts". From May 2015, the TV adverts used the tagline and hashtag of "Power Of Frozen" which were fronted and voiced over by Andre. In 2024, a new advertising campaign was launched featuring TV personality Josie Gibson, and the new tagline "That's why we go to Iceland", which is described as a modern update of their original tagline.

When the chain bought rival Bejam in 1989, they launched the TV-advertising campaign "Use Our Imagination," which included a song. The campaign was launched so quickly after the takeover that they had no time to convert all Bejam stores to the "Iceland" fascia. Therefore, the song for the commercial featured the line "We're at Bejam's too...".

In 2013, Iceland Foods stores appeared in a BBC documentary called Iceland Foods: Life in The Freezer Cabinet. The firm was the main sponsor of the ITV reality TV show I'm a Celebrity...Get Me Out of Here! from its sixth series in 2006 until its fourteenth series in 2014.

In 2018, Iceland announced they would end the use of palm oil in all their own brand products due to concern over environmental impact of palm oil. It was the first major UK supermarket to ban palm oil.

In January 2020 and January 2021, Iceland Foods stores appeared in two Channel 5 series called Inside Iceland: Britain’s Budget Supermarket.

=== Rang-tan advert ===
In November 2018, Iceland Foods submitted a version of an animated short starring a fictional orangutan named Rang-tan (originally released by Greenpeace) to Clearcast, but the submission was denied. Iceland Foods originally planned to utilise the short as the television advertisement that Christmas season, as an extension of their earlier palm oil reduction campaign.

== Animal welfare ==
Iceland states that all of its own-label products meet internal animal welfare standards, which are based on the Five Freedoms developed by the Farm Animal Welfare Council. According to company statements, Iceland requires that animals and poultry be stunned before slaughter in accordance with EU Directive 119/1993, and mandates the use of CCTV in slaughter and shackling areas. These systems must be regularly reviewed by trained personnel, with any breaches reported to the company’s technical manager. Iceland also prohibits the prophylactic use of antibiotics in its supply chain and supports the Agriculture and Horticulture Development Board’s Dairy Calf Strategy.

In 2016, Iceland stated that it would stop sourcing eggs from chickens confined in battery cages by 2025. In March 2025, The Humane League UK ranked Iceland last among UK supermarkets for adherence to cage-free egg commitments, citing that 71% of eggs sold by Iceland continued to come from caged hens. In May 2025, Iceland removed references to its cage-free commitment from its corporate website, a move that it attributed to cost concerns. In July 2025, following pressure by animal welfare organizations including The Humane League, Iceland recommitted to sourcing only cage-free eggs by 2027.

In 2025, Iceland faced a pressure campaign and protest over its sourcing of prawns whose eyestalks were crushed or removed and which were slaughtered without first being rendered unconscious by electrical stunning. In July 2025, it adopted a prawn welfare policy to eliminate the use of eyestalk ablation by 2026 and require stunning for Iceland-label prawns by the end of 2027.
