= Krónan =

Icelandic discount supermarket chain

- Founded: 2000
- Headquarters: Reykjavík, Iceland
- Area served: Iceland
- Products: Groceries
- Parent: Festi
- Website: kronan.is

Krónan is a discount supermarket chain in Iceland. Krónan has been operating since 2000, and is a subsidiary of the holding company Festi.

There are a total of 26 Krónan stores in Iceland.

== See also ==
List of supermarket chains in Iceland
