= Goldsmiths (retailer) =

British jewellery retailer

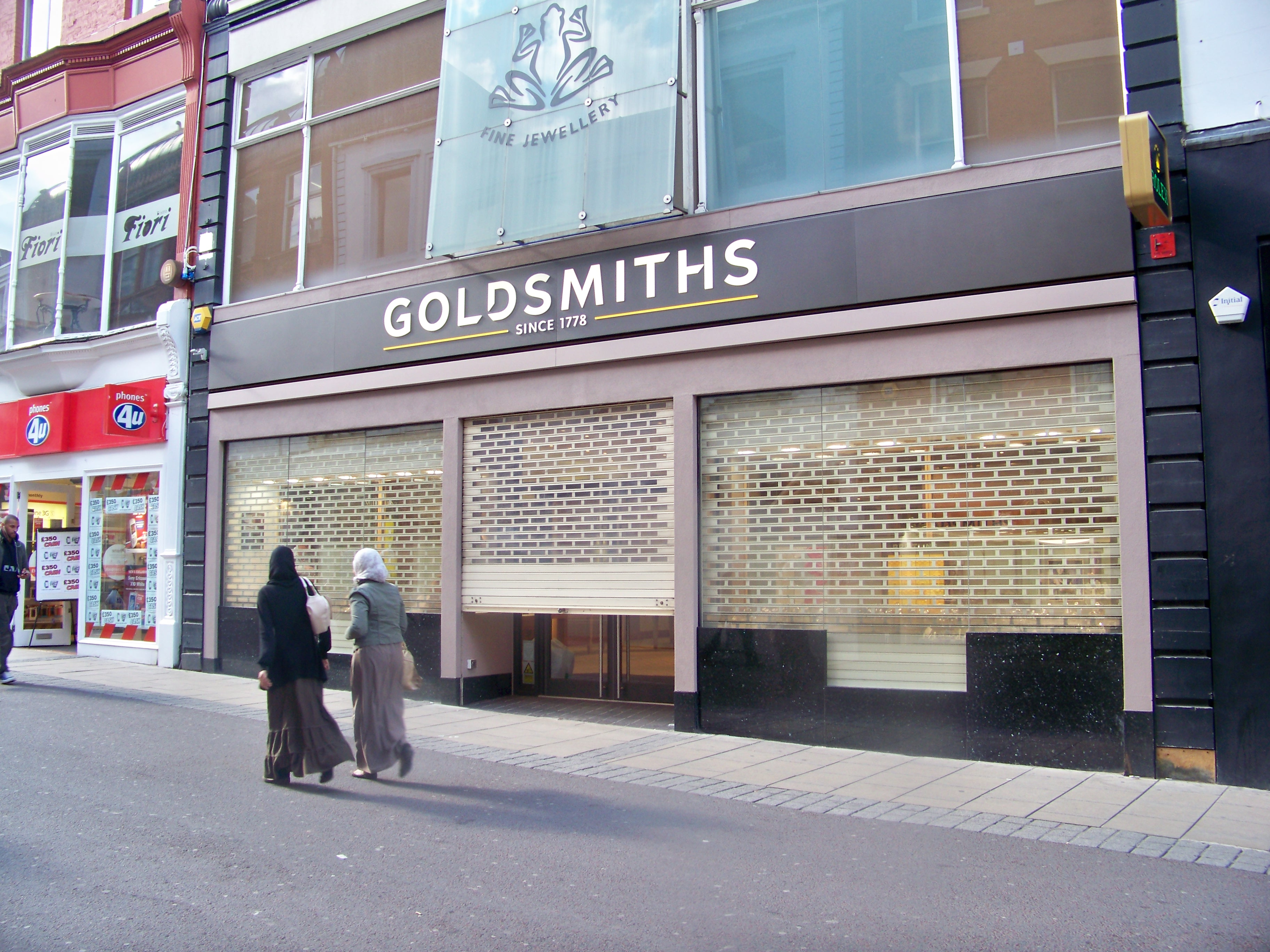
- Goldsmiths jewellers on Commercial Street in Leeds, West Yorkshire
- Company type: Subsidiary
- Industry: Jewellery; Retail
- Founded: 1892; 134 years ago in Newcastle upon Tyne, United Kingdom
- Headquarters: Leicester, United Kingdom
- Area served: United Kingdom
- Products: Jewellery, Watches
- Parent: Watches of Switzerland Group Plc
- Website: goldsmiths.co.uk

Goldsmiths is a luxury jewellery retailer based in the United Kingdom.

== History ==
The business was founded by Thomas Cooke as the Northern Goldsmiths Company in Blackett Street in Newcastle upon Tyne in 1892.

After selling marine chronometers to the Admiralty during the First World War, the company became the UK’s first appointed stockist of Rolex watches in 1919.

The company acquired Reid & Sons, a business founded in the 18th century, in 1967. It changed its name to The Goldsmiths Group in 1984. In 1986, it was acquired by Oriflame, a Swedish cosmetic company who sold off the company's hotel division the following year. A management buy out led by Jurek Piasecki took place in 1988 backed by Schroder Ventures. The group was later listed on the London Stock Exchange. Piasecki led another management buyout in 1999, backed by Alchemy Partners, whose founder, Jon Moulton, had been the managing partner at Schroder Ventures.

The company was acquired by Baugur Group in 2004. In December 2006, Mappin & Webb and Watches of Switzerland were acquired, which were also owned by the Baugur Group. Piasecki was ousted as chairman in 2007 while the company was Britain's second largest jewelers. Baugur became insolvent and went into administration in early 2009. In 2013, Goldsmiths was acquired by an investment fund affiliated with Apollo Global Management. In 2018, the group was renamed the Watches of Switzerland Group, which was floated on the London Stock Exchange in 2019.

== Sport ==
Goldsmiths are a sponsor of the Leicester Tigers Rugby Football Club, sponsoring a stand within the Welford Road stadium and the club's Player of the Month Award.
