= Booker Group =

British food wholesale operator

Booker Group Limited
- Formerly: Blueheath Holdings Limited (June–July 2004); Blueheath Holdings plc (2004–2007); Booker Group plc (2007–2018)
- Type: Subsidiary; Private Limited Company
- Industry: Retail catering
- Founded: 1835; 191 years ago
- Headquarters: Wellingborough, England, UK
- Key people: Jermaine Booker (Executive Chairman); Stewart Gilliland (Chairman); Geoff Byrne (CEO)
- Products: Cash and carry outlets
- Parent: Tesco
- Website: www.booker.co.uk

Booker Group Limited is a British wholesale distributor. It is a subsidiary of Tesco PLC who purchased the company for £3.7 billion in 2018.

== History ==
=== Origins ===
The company was founded by George and Richard Booker in 1835, when they bought their first ship and established the Booker Line, which focused on shipping goods. It later diversified into the distribution of goods, and gradually disposed of its fleet of ships. With a new focus on wholesale food distribution, the company had over 100 warehouses across the United Kingdom by 1978, and was trading as Booker McConnell Ltd.

Among other interests, it operated the sugar industry in Guyana (British Guiana before independence in 1966), running five Booker Line ships, until it was nationalised around 1970. After six months, Booker was called back to market the sugar. Booker had a long history of exploitation of sugar workers through the indentured labour system during the 19th and 20th centuries (outright slavery was abolished in British Guiana before Booker's founding, but exploitative labour practices continued. All of the Booker brothers had claimed and received 'compensation' payments for their post 1815 Guiana slave holdings - see U.C.L. "Legacies of British Slave-ownership" index). At its peak, it controlled 75% of the sugar industry in British Guiana and was so powerful that a common joke was to refer to the country as "Booker's Guiana".

In 1952, Jock Campbell took over the chairmanship of the company and his Fabian social politics transformed it dramatically into a benevolent force providing major benefits for sugar workers. Jock Campbell was also instrumental in the setting up of Booker's Author Division, which sponsored the Booker Prize.

=== Expansion ===
In 1986, the company set up a short-lived co-venture between the directors of Siriol Animation to create Kalisto. Kalisto also developed a show called Space Baby (which eventually became Fantastic Max), along with another series called Satellite City (which was co-produced with Fairwater Films) and the animated film The Little Engine That Could. Kalisto barely lasted a year before Booker bought the rights back.

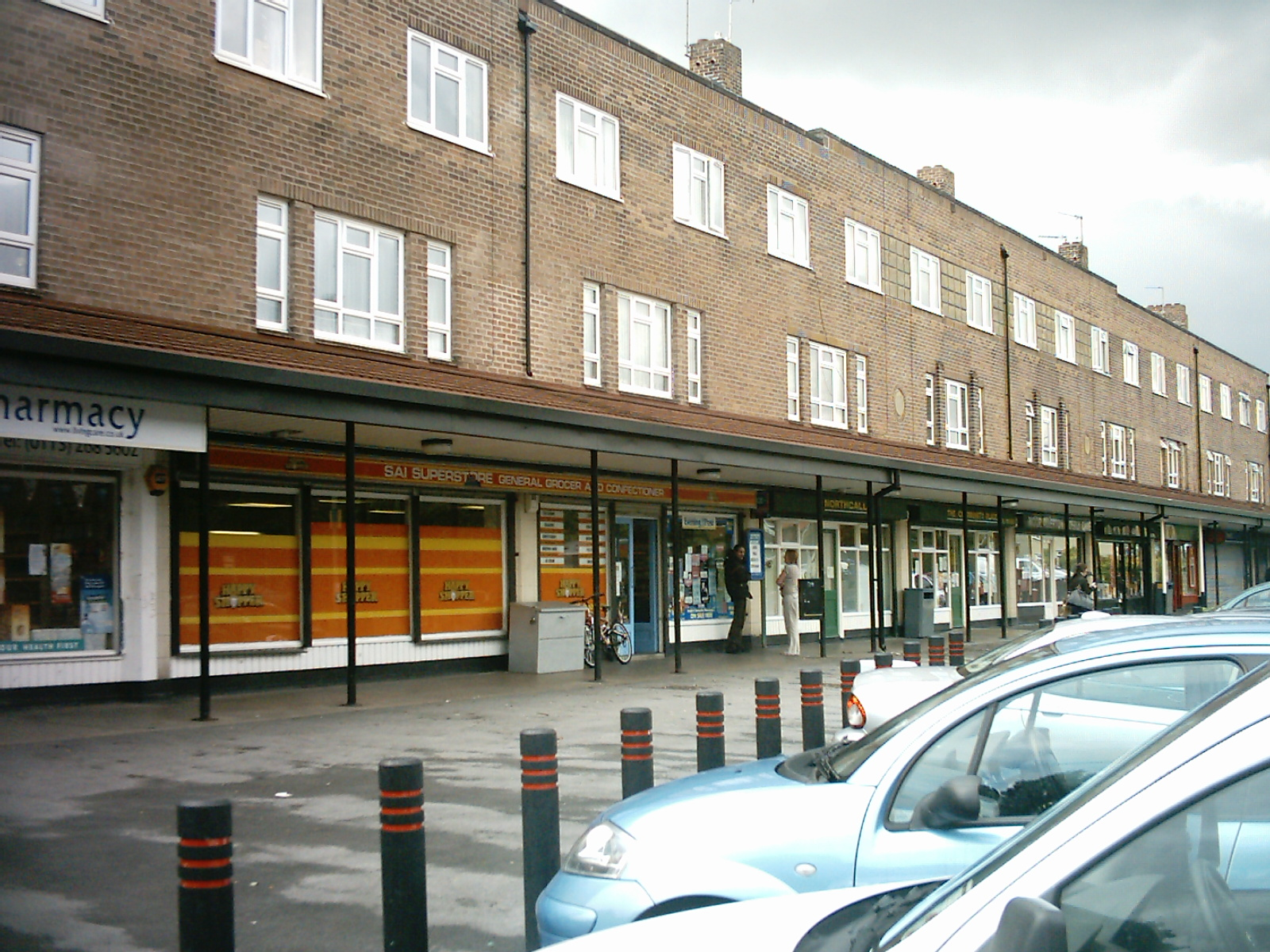
Happy Shopper, Black Moor Estate, Moor Allerton, Leeds

In November 1996, Booker bought Nurdin & Peacock, taking ownership of the convenience store operator and brand Happy Shopper. Happy Shopper's products are sold by Booker to independent convenience stores and off licences. In 2000, the brand's logo of a smiling face with blonde hair was dropped from products and packaging, as part of a redesign by Partners In Communication, a design consultant company.

In May 2000, Booker was purchased by Iceland Supermarkets, via its Big Food Group vehicle. Then, in December 2004, Big Food Group was in turn bought by acquisitive Icelandic group, Baugur, which split Booker and Iceland again into different companies.

In June 2007, Booker reversed into an AIM listed wholesaler of groceries Blueheath, to form Booker Group plc. Baugur sold all its assets in Booker Cash & Carry in June 2008, only weeks after its founder was found guilty of accounting irregularities. Baugur collapsed in February 2009, amidst the Icelandic financial crisis.

In September 2009, Booker opened a store in Mumbai and planned to expand its cash and carry stores across India. In May 2012, Metro Group sold the thirty stores of Makro in the United Kingdom and all operational assets to Booker Group Plc, in return for 9.99% of Booker's share capital, plus £15.8 million in cash; although the merger was referred to the Office of Fair Trading it was cleared by the Competition Commission in April 2013.

In May 2015, Booker Group confirmed it had reached an agreement with Musgrave Group to buy the Budgens and Londis grocery chains, for £40 million.

In January 2017, Tesco announced that it had reached an agreement to merge with Booker Group for £3.7 billion, subject to shareholder and regulatory approval. It was confirmed on 5 March 2018 that Tesco had completed its merger with Booker.

== Criticism ==
Booker have been accused of forcing the closure of local businesses and shops through undercutting their prices in Tesco stores, the group's owner, while providing higher prices in their wholesale arm. Additionally, it has been accused of intentionally stopping deliveries of certain essential products to independent stores, in some cases reducing item selection by up to 30%.

== Operations ==
The company supplies approximately 1.5 million businesses across the United Kingdom, through its different divisions. It operates cash and carry branches throughout the United Kingdom (as well as a few in India) and operates a national delivery service in the United Kingdom. The industry journal The Grocer named Booker the "Green Wholesaler of the Year" at the Grocer Gold Awards.

The group consists of several divisions each specialising in different areas of the wholesale market in the United Kingdom:

Subsidiaries of Booker Group Limited (Tesco plc)
Name	Founded	Description
Booker Wholesale Holdings Limited		A cash and carry and delivery company in the United Kingdom.
Makro Self Service Wholesalers Limited		A cash and carry and delivery company in the United Kingdom.
Booker Direct Limited		A wholesale business catering for cinemas and HM Prison Service in the United Kingdom.
Classic Drinks Limited		A wholesale business in the United Kingdom.
Ritter-Courivaud Limited		A wholesale business catering for restaurants in the United Kingdom.
Premier Stores Limited		a symbol group of independent convenience stores. The Premier name is owned by Booker Group with the stores owned by individuals who agree to a minimum spend each week with Booker Wholesale in exchange for business support and access to the branding.
Booker India		
Booker Retail Partners (GB) Limited		

== Booker Authors' Division ==
The company also founded, and was previously a sponsor of, the Booker Prize for literary fiction, which was established in 1968. During Lord Campbell of Eskan's tenure as chairman of the company, then known as Booker–McConnell, he was also instrumental in the setting up of the Booker's Authors' Division. Lord Campbell of Eskan purchased 51 per cent of Glidrose Ltd, which owned the copyrights of his friend Ian Fleming for £100,000.

This purchase was the foundation of the Authors' Division, which also acquired rights to some well known authors' works, such as Georgette Heyer, whose company, Heron Enterprises, with eighteen of her copyrights, Booker bought in 1966 for £80,000, Dennis Wheatley, and the 64% stake in Agatha Christie's works not controlled by her family. When, in 1968, Booker established the prestigious Booker Prize, it was with the money from the Fleming, Heyer and Christie purchases.

In June 1998, Agatha Christie's stakeholding was sold to Chorion for £10 million, who themselves sold it on in February 2012 to Acorn Media UK. The division also co founded and sponsored the prestigious Booker–McConnell Prize for literature in 1968, now known as Booker Prize. This was transferred to the independent Booker Prize Foundation in 2002, and became sponsored by the Man Group plc, who opted to retain the well known "Booker" name.

Chairmen of the Authors' Division have included Charles William Tyrrell (1960s–1970s), Dennis H. Joss (1970s–1980s) and Agatha Christie's grandson Mathew Caradoc Thomas Prichard (1990s–2000s).

== See also ==
- Premier Stores – Booker convenience store chain
- Euro Shopper – product branding across Europe, owned by Booker in the United Kingdom.
