= Pálmi Jónsson =

Icelandic businessman

Pálmi Jónsson (June 3, 1923 – April 4, 1991) was an Icelandic businessman and entrepreneur born in Hofsós, Iceland who founded the large Icelandic supermarket chain Hagkaup, and pioneered the inception of Kringlan the first indoor shopping mall in Iceland. He was the father of Sigurður Gísli, Jón, Ingibjörg Stefanía Pálmadóttir, and Lilja Sigurlína, who collectively inherited Hagkaup when he died.
