= Richard Walker, Baron Walker of Broxton =

Director of Iceland supermarkets (born 1980)

The Right Honourable The Lord Walker of Broxton OBE

Member of the House of Lords
- Lord Temporal
- Life peerage 20 January 2026

Personal details
- Born: 5 August 1980 (age 46)
- Party: Labour

Richard Malcolm Walker, Baron Walker of Broxton OBE (born 5 August 1980) is a British businessman who is the executive chairman of the privately held British Iceland supermarket chain of predominately frozen food retailers. He is the son of the company's founder Malcolm Walker and qualified as a Chartered Surveyor, prior to joining Iceland. In 2023 he expressed an interest in standing for Parliament as a Conservative, but later left the party to join Labour.

In January 2026 he was raised to the peerage, becoming Baron Walker of Broxton, taking his seat in the House of Lords on the Labour benches.

== Personal life ==
Walker was born on 5 August 1980 and is the son of Sir Malcolm Walker, who founded Iceland in 1970. He graduated in geography from Durham University in 2001, and qualified as a Chartered Surveyor. He is married with two children.

He was chair of trustees of the environmental campaign group Surfers Against Sewage until 2022.

When invited by New Scientist in 2021 to choose one of the "best popular science books" he nominated Enric Sala's The Nature of Nature.

He has said that the best advice he has been given was from his father, who said "Never, ever, ever, ever give up".

== Education ==
Walker was educated at The Grange School, Northwich and holds a BA (Hons) in Geography from Durham University (St Aidan's College), where he served as Social Committee Chair in 2000. He later completed a Postgraduate Diploma in Real Estate Management at London South Bank University while working at Jones Lang LaSalle. In 2022, he was awarded an Honorary Doctorate of Science from the University of Bedfordshire and became an Honorary Fellow of University College London.

== Career ==
Walker co-founded the property company Bywater in 2006, naming it after the street where he lived at the time. As of 2022 he is still its chair though he stepped back from day-to-day involvement in 2013.

He joined Iceland, which his father Malcolm Walker had founded in 1970, after his father regained control of the company in 2012. He worked on the shop floor and in store management before becoming managing director.

In March 2019, Walker became one of 127 new members to join the World Economic Forum Young Global Leaders program.

In 2021 he published The Green Grocer, which recounted his career and his ideas about business and the environment. Chris Packham described it as "A remarkable insight: honest, pragmatic, hopeful and realistic", and the Financial Times' reviewer called it "an honest and positive book".

In January 2023, Walker was appointed as executive chairman of Iceland as his father Malcolm Walker was due to step down, during this time Richard Walker also stated he will be taking over as chair of the Iceland Foods Charitable Foundation.

== Politics ==
In 2023, he revealed he was a Conservative Party candidate to stand for election to the House of Commons. He later quit the party after failing to be selected for a Parliamentary seat, despite writing a letter to Rishi Sunak ‘begging’ to be allowed one, and labelled it 'out of touch’. He also withdrew from the list of potential MPs. In January 2024, Walker announced that he would be supporting Labour leader Keir Starmer to be the next Prime Minister of the United Kingdom.

He was appointed to the House of Lords by Prime Minister, Keir Starmer in January 2026. He became Lord Walker of Broxton. In February 2026, Keir Starmer directly appointed Walker to be the Government's expert Cost of Living Champion.The voluntary role will focus on providing ideas, advice and expertise across the whole of government to deliver on easing the cost of living for families.

In June 2026, Walker delivered an interim report to the Government in his role as Cost of Living Champion. The report considered household costs including energy, debt and recurring bills, as well as wider issues relating to welfare and youth unemployment.

== Charity fundraising ==
In May 2023, Richard Walker successfully summited Everest with the aim of raising £1 million for The National Brain Appeal. His efforts were directed towards establishing the world's first Rare Dementia Support Centre. Walker was accompanied by renowned mountaineer Kenton Cool, who has now achieved a record 17 ascents of Everest.

Walker embarked on this expedition in honour of his mother, Lady Walker, who was diagnosed with young-onset Alzheimer's over ten years earlier.

The funds raised from this endeavour were allocated to the development of a pioneering center dedicated to supporting individuals and families affected by inherited, atypical, and young-onset dementias.

This climb also commemorated the 50th anniversary of the Iceland Food Charitable Foundation. The Foundation is integral to Iceland Foods' commitment to philanthropy, encapsulated in their 'Doing it Right' philosophy. As of 2025 the Foundation focuses on dementia, the environment, wellbeing, and children. As of July 2024 it had raised over £37 million to advance dementia diagnosis, improve treatments, and ultimately find a cure.

In 2024 Richard Walker ran the London Marathon to raise money for Alzheimer's Research UK. He collapsed near Mile 25 with heatstroke and almost died, but was saved by volunteer paramedics from St John Ambulance whom he credited with saving his life.

Walker has helped raise over £10 million for dementia research, including a £10 million gift from the IFCF to support the creation of a world-first Rare Dementia Support Centre at UCL. He continues to support Alzheimer's Research UK and CALM (Campaign Against Living Miserably) through public awareness and funding.

== Expeditions ==
A passionate mountaineer, Walker has undertaken climbs around the world. In 2011, he joined his father Sir Malcolm Walker in a charity expedition to the North Col of Everest, raising over £1 million for Alzheimer's Research UK. In 2023, he summited Mount Everest. In 2018, he completed first ascents in the Tien Shan mountains of Kyrgyzstan, including one peak named “Rhianydd” in honour of his late mother. The expedition was documented in the American Alpine Journal.

== Charities and Committees ==
Walker chairs the Iceland Foods Charitable Foundation (IFCF), which has donated over £38 million to health, education, environmental and dementia-related causes. He is also:

- Vice President of Fauna & Flora International
- Patron of Cheshire Wildlife Trust
- Ambassador for Alzheimer's Research UK and The Wildlife Trusts
- Founding member of DEFRA's Council for Sustainable Business
- Former member of the Prime Minister's Business Council

In 2022, he was named a World Economic Forum Young Global Leader.

== Campaigning ==
Walker has led several high-profile environmental and social campaigns during his leadership at Iceland Foods

- Plastic-free packaging: In 2018, Iceland became the first UK supermarket to commit to eliminating plastic from its own-label packaging.
- Palm oil removal: The business removed palm oil from all own-brand products to highlight the impact of deforestation.
- Second Chance programme: Iceland provides employment to ex-offenders through a structured rehabilitation scheme, including a dedicated training academy at HMP Oakwood.
- Infant formula access: He has campaigned for regulatory reform to make infant formula more affordable for struggling families.
- Cost of living advocacy: Through partnerships with ethical lender Fair for You, the Iceland Food Club has helped tens of thousands of families access interest-free credit for essentials.

== Controversy ==
Walker has been the subject of criticism for espousing environmental values while engaging in practices such as using a company helicopter for travel purposes.

== Recognition ==
In 2021, Walker was made an honorary fellow of University College London.

Walker was appointed Officer of the Order of the British Empire (OBE) in the 2022 Birthday Honours for services to business and the environment.

In December 2025, Walker was nominated for a peerage as part of the 2025 Political Peerages to sit in the House of Lords as a Labour peer; he was created Baron Walker of Broxton, of Broxton in the County of Cheshire on 20 January 2026.

== Selected publications ==
- The Green Grocer: One Man's Manifesto for Corporate Activism. DK. 1 April 2021. ISBN 978-0241492239.
- The Prime Minister's Cost of Living Champion: Interim Report. May 2026.
- Our Moral and Economic Duty to Make the Labour Party the Party of Work: A Report by Lord Walker of Broxton
