= Kat Maconie =

Designer

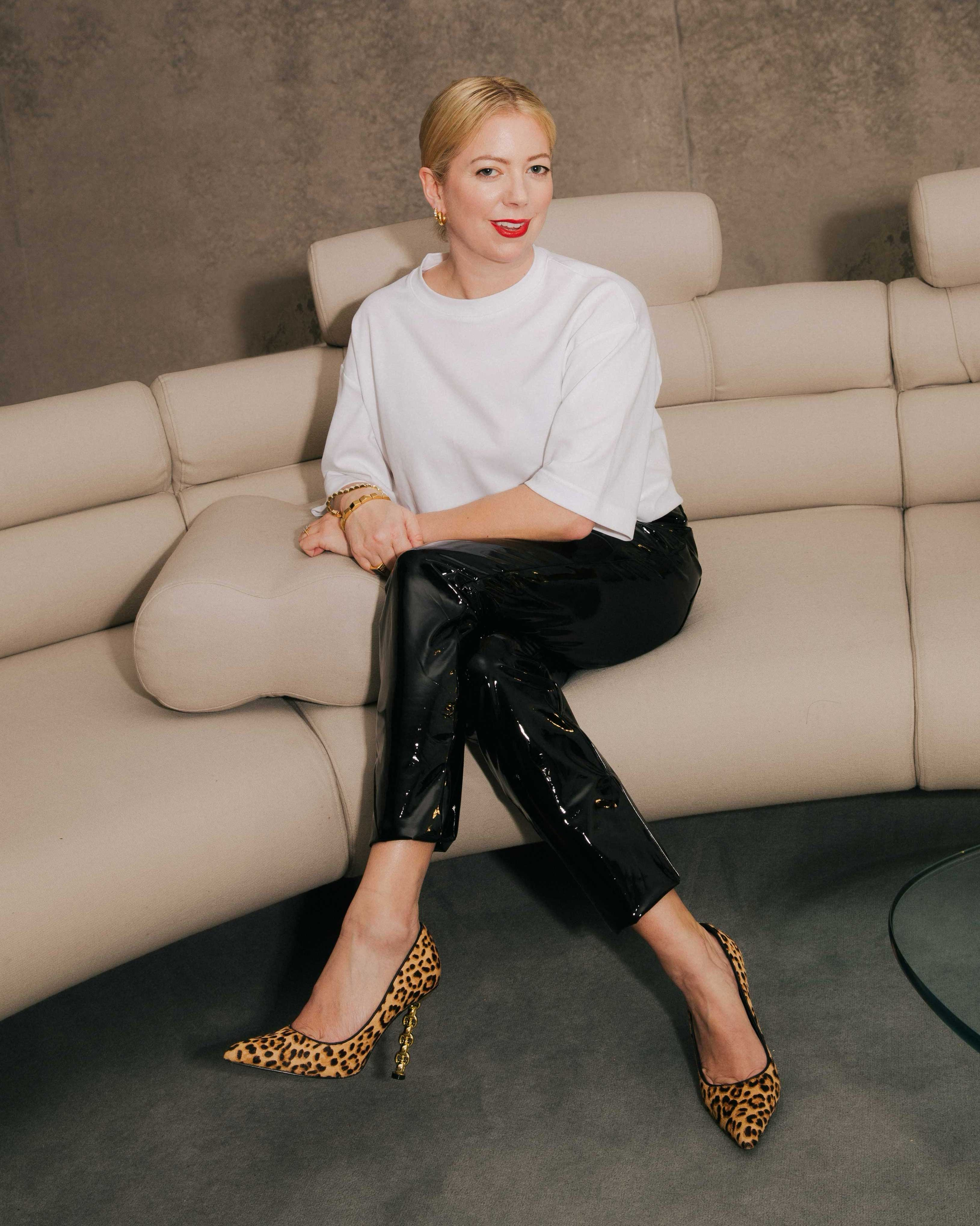

Kat Maconie (born 5 February 1984) is a London-based footwear designer who started her own label, which also produces handbags and jewellery, in 2009. She has partnered with other organisations for projects including limited-edition pieces and pop-up cocktail bars.

== Life ==
Maconie was born in London and she attended the London College of Fashion.

After two years at Whistles, working on buying and product development, Maconie moved into fashion recruitment and began creating her label part-time. She has collaborated with high street brands including Dune, and fashion designers including Felder Felder and Fyodor Golan, making shoes for their catwalk shows at London Fashion Week Her shoes are sold in twenty countries and in online stores including Nordstrom and Level Shoes. She won Drapers Shoe Designer of the Year award in 2013.

In 2013 the brand secured an investment from venture capital trust Pembroke.

== Stores ==
In January 2019, the company opened its first UK store, in Bermondsey Street.
