= Bónus =

Icelandic supermarket chain

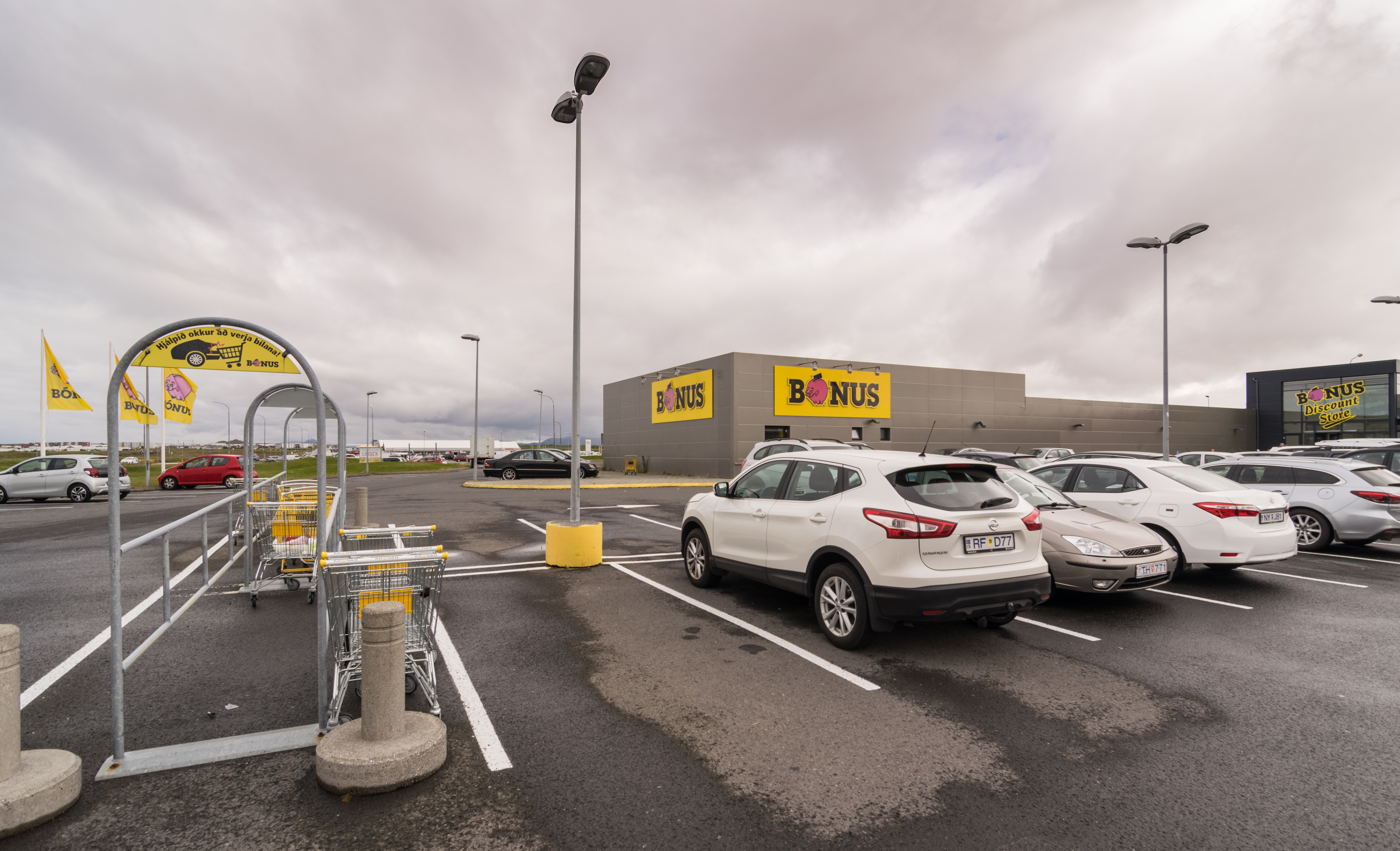
- Bónus store in Keflavík
- Type: Subsidiary
- Industry: Retail
- Founded: April 1989; 37 years ago
- Founder: Jón Ásgeir Jóhannesson; Jóhannes Jónsson
- Headquarters: Reykjavík, Iceland
- Number of locations: 41 (2024)
- Area served: Iceland; Faroe Islands
- Products: Discount store
- Number of employees: 1,000 (2019)
- Parent: Hagar
- Website: bonus.is

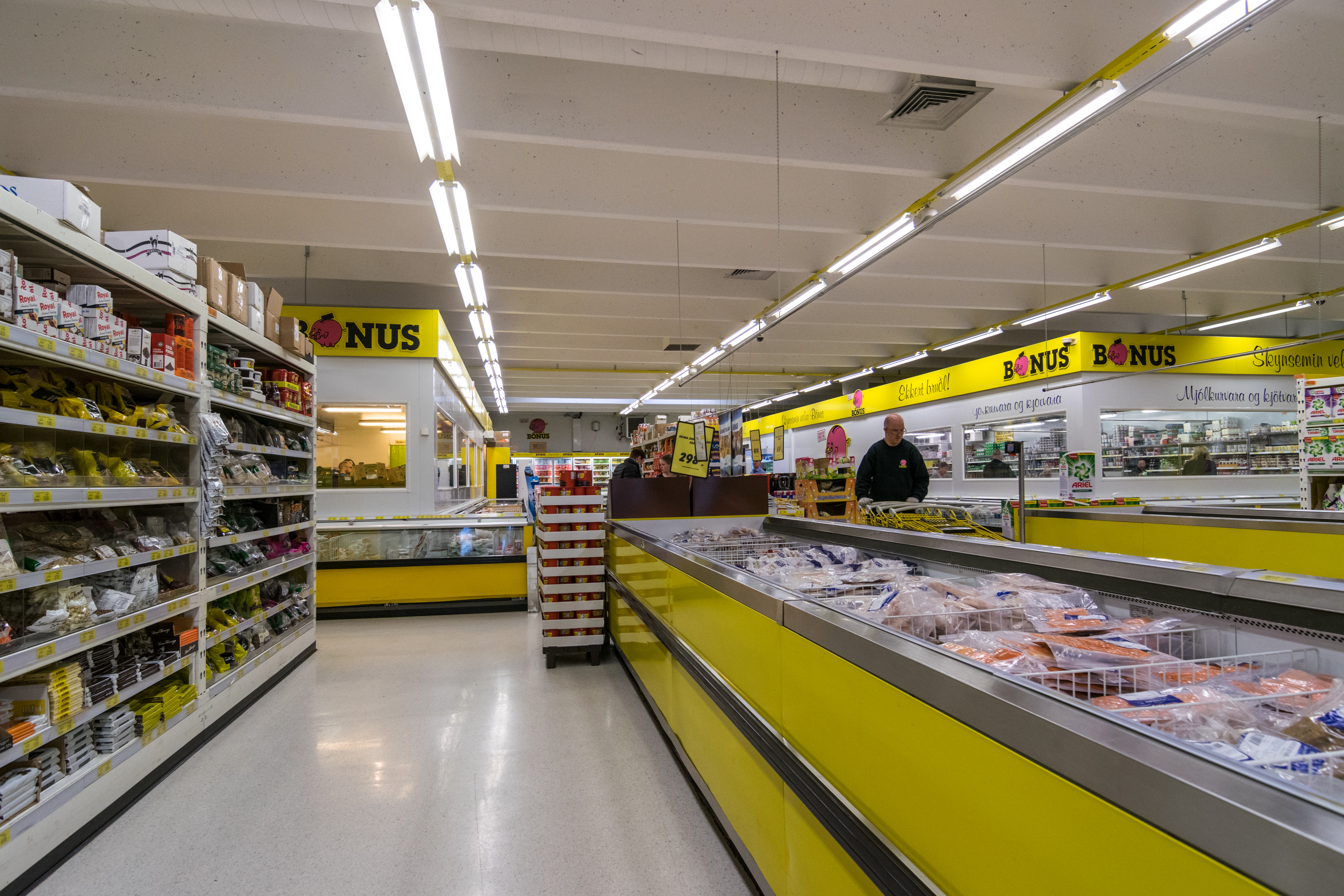
Interior of a Bónus location

Bónus (Icelandic pronunciation: [ˈpouːnʏs]) is an Icelandic no-frills supermarket chain owned by Hagar. Bónus operates thirty-three stores in Iceland and eight stores in the Faroe Islands. It follows the no-frills format of limited hours, simple shelves, and having a giant fridge instead of chiller cabinets.

== History ==
Bónus was started by Jón Ásgeir Jóhannesson and his father, Jóhannes Jónsson, with the first store in Skútuvogur street in Reykjavík in April, 1989. Within just a few years, the chain became the biggest supermarket chain in Iceland. In 1992, another Icelandic supermarket, Hagkaup, bought a 50% stake, and in 1993, Hagkaup and Bónus established a joint purchasing company named Baugur. In 1994, the company began expanding into the Faroe Islands.

Bónus and Hagkaup are now both owned by Baugur Group's subdivision Hagar.
