= Julian Graves =

Health food retailer in the United Kingdom

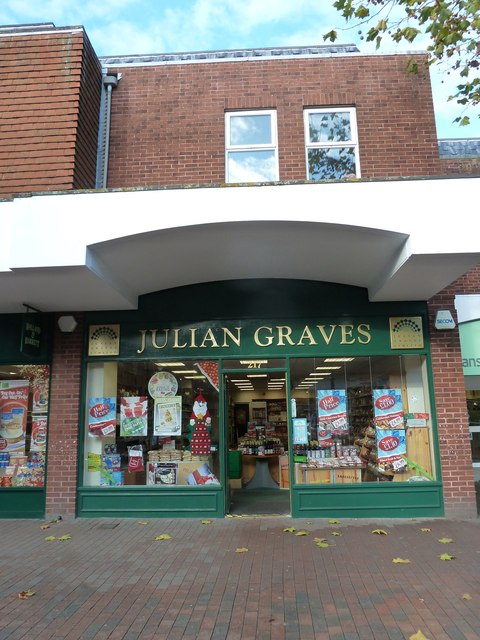
Julian Graves, Lewes in 2011

Julian Graves was a health food retailer, with 189 stores in the United Kingdom and Ireland, selling health foods, a limited range of kitchenware, baking ingredients and confectionery items. NBTY (which also owned Holland and Barrett) acquired the company in September 2008 from Baugur Group, with the merger approved in August 2009. On 2 July 2012, Julian Graves went into administration after failing to make a profit in the previous four years.
