= Ingibjörg Stefanía Pálmadóttir =

Icelandic businesswoman

Ingibjörg Stefanía Pálmadóttir (born 1961) is an Icelandic businesswoman, daughter of Pálmi Jónsson and so, with her three siblings, one of the inheritors of Pálmi's Hagkaup business.

== Career ==
She attended the Parsons The New School for Design.

Ingibjörg is noted for running a range of businesses, sometimes associated with the 'Reykjavík 101' brand popularised by Hallgrímur Helgason's novel 101 Reykjavík, prominently including the Reykjavík 101 Hotel, an expensive boutique hotel, and 101 Capital. 101 Capital was declared bankrupt in January 2012.

Alongside her husband Jón Ásgeir, Ingibjörg was a prominent figure in the Icelandic banking boom and subsequent 2008–11 Icelandic financial crisis. She is credited with advising Jón Ásgeir on his acquisitions in the clothing and fashion sectors, and was a leading figure in Icelandic celebrity life. She was elected as Jón Ásgeir's replacement as chairman of FL Group in June 2008, shortly before its bankruptcy in September of that year.

Ingibjörg is the main owner of the 'A' part of Iceland's biggest media conglomerate, 365, who owns an 89,7% share both directly and through the companies Moon Capital S.á.r.l., ML 102 ehf. and IP Studium ehf. She is also the main owner of the 'B' part, with a 99,99% through the company Moon Capital S.á.r.l. In 2010 she supported Jón Ásgeir in trying to sack a journalist who had mocked him on the Internet.

== Personal life ==
She has three children: Sigurður Pálmi, Júlíana Sól and Melkorka Katrín. In addition, she is stepmother to the children of her husband, Jón Ásgeir Jóhannesson: Ása Karen, Anton Felix and Stefán Franz.
