= Hagar (company) =

Icelandic holding company

Hagar hf
- Type: Hlutafélag
- Traded as: Nasdaq Iceland: HAGA
- Industry: Retail
- Founded: 2003
- Headquarters: Kópavogur, Iceland
- Key people: Finnur Oddsson (CEO); Eiríkur S. Jóhannsson (chairman)
- Number of employees: 3,500
- Website: hagar.is

Hagar hf. is an Icelandic holding company based in Reykjavík that owns a number of retail and wholesale companies in Iceland, Faroe Islands, and Netherlands. Each of Hagar's companies are run individually. As of 2014, Hagar's subsidiaries had a combined 48% market share in the Icelandic food retail market.

== Operations ==
- Hagkaup
- Bónus
- Olís ehf
- Eldum rétt
- Aðföng
- SMS
- Bananar ehf
- Stórkaup
- Mylnan

Hagar also used to operate stores in Iceland under franchise agreements for Debenhams, Topshop, Zara, Warehouse, Evans, Dorothy Perkins and Karen Millen. As of the beginning of 2018, Zara is the only remaining franchise still in operation.
