= Steinunn =

Steinunn may refer to:

- Ragnhildur Steinunn Jónsdóttir (born 1981), Icelandic television personality, actress, and former Ms. Iceland
- Steinunn Ólína Þorsteinsdóttir, Icelandic actress, writer and producer
- Steinunn Finnsdóttir (c. 1640 – c. 1710), Icelandic poet
- Steinunn Kristín Þórðardóttir (born 1972), Managing Director of Glitnir Bank in London, UK
- Steinunn Refsdóttir, Icelandic skaldic poetic active at the end of the 10th century
- Steinunn Sigurðardóttir (born 1950), Icelandic author
- Steinunn Sigurðardóttir (fatahönnuður), Icelandic fashion designer
- Steinunn Valdís Óskarsdóttir (born 1965), Icelandic politician, and a former mayor of Reykjavík
