= Malcolm Walker (businessman) =

English businessman

Sir Malcolm Walker CBE
- Born: 11 February 1946 (age 80); Grange Moor, West Yorkshire, England
- Occupation: Businessman
- Known for: Founder, Iceland supermarket chain
- Term: 1970–2023
- Spouse: Rhianydd Walker (died 2021) Natalie Walker (2022)
- Children: 3, includes Richard Walker

Sir Malcolm Conrad Walker CBE (born 11 February 1946) is an English businessman who is the founder of Iceland Foods Ltd.

== Early life ==
Malcolm Conrad Walker was born in Grange Moor, West Yorkshire, the son of a poultry farmer, and was educated at Mirfield Grammar School. He originally co-founded Iceland Foods in 1970 with Peter Hinchcliffe and considered naming it "Penguin"; he credited his first wife with coming up with the Iceland brand name. The company had a national presence by the late 1980s.

== Personal life ==
Walker was married for over 50 years to Rhianydd, until her death in 2021 and founded the Lady Walker Fund for Dementia in her memory. His Grade II listed family home is near Chester, Cheshire. The couple had three children. Their only son, Richard, is the current managing director of Iceland.

Walker remarried to Natalie in 2022, and they live together on the family estate.

In May 2017, Walker donated £50,000 to the Conservative Party. His knighthood was announced the following month.

In January 2023, Walker was the subject of Desert Island Discs on BBC Radio 4 and chose "Quando me'n vo'" from Puccini's La bohème (sung by Natalie Walker), Robinson Crusoe by Daniel Defoe, and a giant cooking pot as his favourite record, book and luxury item respectively.

== Wealth ==
In 2019, The Sunday Times Rich List estimated Walker's wealth at £265 million.

== Controversy ==
In 2013, during the horse meat food contamination scandal, Walker attracted criticism for making negative comments about Irish people and the Food Safety Authority of Ireland.

== Recognition ==
Walker was appointed Commander of the Order of the British Empire (CBE), in the 1995 New Year Honours "for services to the frozen food industry", and was knighted in the 2017 Birthday Honours, for services to retailing, entrepreneurship and charity. He has been awarded honorary degrees by Bangor University, Liverpool John Moores University, Wrexham Glyndŵr University, the University of Huddersfield and the University of Chester, and is an Honorary Fellow of University College London.
