= The Big Food Group =

Former British food retail and wholesale holding company

- Industry: Food retail and wholesale
- Predecessors: Iceland; Booker Cash & Carry plc
- Founded: 2000; 26 years ago
- Defunct: 2005
- Fate: Acquired by Baugur Group and split up
- Successors: Iceland; Booker Cash & Carry; Woodward Foodservice; Expert Logistics; PropCo

The Big Food Group was a food retail and wholesale company based in the UK. It was created in 2000 when the supermarket chain Iceland merged with Booker Cash & Carry plc.

The company was purchased by Icelandic retail consortium Baugur Group in 2005, and split into:

- Retail: Iceland
- Wholesale: Booker Cash & Carry
- Foodservices: Woodward Foodservice
- Logistics: Expert Logistics

The property portfolio was spun out into a separate company called PropCo, for £213 million, and then leased back.
