= Jane Shepherdson =

English businesswoman (born 1961)

Jane Shepherdson CBE
- Born: Jane Elizabeth Shepherdson; August 23, 1961 (age 64); Kingston upon Hull, Yorkshire, England
- Education: Clifton High School, Bristol
- Alma mater: University of North London (Business Studies)
- Occupation: Businesswoman
- Years active: 1980s–present
- Employer(s): Whistles; Arcadia Group
- Known for: Brand director of Topshop; chief executive of Whistles
- Awards: Commander of the Order of the British Empire (2015)

Jane Elizabeth Shepherdson CBE (born 23 August 1961 in Kingston upon Hull, Yorkshire) is an English businesswoman. As of 2016 she was the chief executive of UK clothing brand Whistles, and had been the brand director for high-street women's wear store TopShop.

She grew up in Bristol where her father was head of the mathematics department at the university, and her mother was a biochemist. She was educated at Clifton High School, where she began customising her clothes. She studied Business Studies at the University of North London, joining the Burton Group (now the Arcadia Group), after being inspired by her mother's story of a fashion buyer friend.

Shepherdson started as a warehouse picker sending stock to stores, and was then promoted to become a buyer in the jersey department. She ordered a shipment of tank tops, of which 500,000 were sold in a week. Her initiatives at TopShop included:

- TopShop Freshers' Week party - to attract teenaged customers
- TopShop To Go - delivering items from a list of 100
- TopShop Express - fast online motor scooter delivery

The Times quoted her views on the need for speed in introducing fashion in 2006, at TopShop.

A week after TopShop owner Philip Green announced that supermodel Kate Moss had signed a deal to design clothes to be launched in 2007, Shepherdson resigned from Topshop, and was producing, unpaid, a fashion chain for Oxfam, aimed at "ethically conscious shoppers". She has hit out at "cheap, cheap" clothes that exploit workers in developing countries, possibly referring to Kate Moss's range.

In January 2008, Shepherdson bought a 20 per cent share in Whistles and was appointed chief executive. In September 2016, she left the company and later took up the position of chair at My Wardrobe HQ.

Shepherdson is married to a criminal defence lawyer, and cycles from their flat in South London to work. She lists her hobbies as running, horse riding, skiing, and shopping.

Already a Member of the Order of the British Empire (MBE), she was appointed Commander of the Order of the British Empire (CBE) in the 2015 New Year Honours for services to UK retail business.
