= Whistles (company) =

English clothing store chain

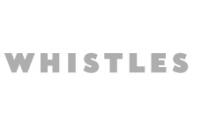
- Company type: Subsidiary
- Industry: Fashion
- Founded: 1976
- Headquarters: London, England
- Number of locations: 40+ stand-alone stores(August 2022)
- Products: Clothing, Accessories
- Services: Personal Styling
- Number of employees: 501-1000(August 2022)
- Parent: Foschini Group
- Website: www.whistles.co.uk

Whistles is a women's contemporary fashion brand with more than 40 stores and 60 concessions in the UK, USA, Europe, Hong Kong, and Australia. It was founded in 1976 by Lucille and Richard Lewin.

In January 2008, Jane Shepherdson, former Topshop director, signed a deal to purchase a 20 per cent stake in Whistles and was appointed as chief executive.

The brand was scheduled to unveil its relaunch days before Lehman Brothers collapsed. It survived the subsequent global economic recession of 2008-2009, during which one of its largest backers, Baugur, went bankrupt.

In March 2016, Whistles and its then-46 shops were bought by the South African retailer, Foschini Group. In September of that year, Shepherdson left her position as chief executive.

== Product ==
In the past, the style of Whistles was described as having "a pretty but decidedly yummy mummy-ish air". Since Shepherdson's appointment as chief executive, the clothes were said to have cleaner silhouettes with a more sophisticated palette; "baby pinks and lilacs have made way for olives, camel, china blue, tea rose and yes, plenty of black – and the detailing has a quirky vintage feel rather than being fussy."

After this successful rebranding, Whistles had effectively shifted directions from boho-chic, which Shepherdson felt was outdated, to "effortless" and minimalist. Having attracted loyal and therefore older customers for some time, their goal was to target younger customers, "between 25 and 45," who are "confident about fashion, has their own innate style, knows what she wants to look like, quite independent, works in creative industries like media, fashion, the arts."

Unlike a number of brands at parent company Topshop, Whistles is not considered to be fast fashion, citing the needs of older customers in professional careers who want more expensive clothes that last longer while still retaining "the excitement of trends". The clothing and accessories can also be bought through Bloomingdale's in the United States.

At retailers that sell Whistles products, customers can expect to pay anywhere within the contemporary or popular fashion price point.

== Sustainability ==
In 2019, Whistles's Head of CSR and Sustainability, Francesca Mangano, outlined the brand's efforts to increase sustainability and decrease impact on the environment. In 2021, 55% of the corresponding year's collection "incorporated elements of responsible and lower impact materials," with 47% of the spring and summer and 53% of the autumn and winter collections incorporating "responsible materials".

The sustainability efforts outlined include reducing the impact made on the planet's environment, protecting human rights and fair labour standards, increasing inclusivity among employees, replacing fabrics with "more responsible fibres and lower impact alternatives", increasing responsible waste and chemical management, and collaborating with their suppliers to decrease environmental footprints left by transportation.

Whistles is a signatory to the UK Government Modern Slavery Pledge, the End Uyghur Forced Labour Coalition, and participated in the UN Global Compact addressing the more than 400,000 seafarers stranded at sea due to the ongoing Covid-19 pandemic.
