= Hagkaup =

Icelandic hypermarket chain

- Type: Private
- Industry: Retail
- Genre: Supermarket
- Founded: 1959
- Headquarters: Reykjavík, Iceland
- Area served: Iceland
- Number of employees: 700
- Parent: Hagar
- Website: www.hagkaup.is

Hagkaup (Icelandic pronunciation: [ˈhaːɣˌkʰœyːp]) is an Icelandic hypermarket chain owned by retail company Hagar. Its concept is wide selection of food and non-food products including clothing, electronics, entertainment, seasonal goods and toys.

== History ==
Founded in 1959 by Pálmi (1923–91) in an old barn as a mail-order company, it found success as a cheaper choice than most other retailers in Reykjavík. The company soon expanded and opened up its first store in the barn. In 1967 Hagkaup opened the first supermarket in Iceland in an old warehouse in Skeifan, Reykjavík, which continues to enjoy great popularity among its customers to this day. The Hagkaup head office is located in Holtagarðar, Reykjavík.

In 1998 the children of Pálmi Jónsson—Sigurður Gísli, Jón, Ingibjörg and Lilja—sold the company and their 50% stake in Bónus, Hagkaup's main rival in the food retail sector, to a group of investors led by Bónus' founders. This transaction was the foundation of Baugur Group, an international retail and real estate investment company.
