= Baron Sainsbury =

Baron Sainsbury was created in 1962 for Alan Sainsbury in the Peerage of the United Kingdom.

There have been two other peers with the surname "Sainsbury" who included their surname as part of their titles; all are from the Sainsbury family, namesake of the supermarket chain Sainsbury's.

The three peers, in order of when they received their title, are:

- Alan Sainsbury, Baron Sainsbury, of Drury Lane in the Borough of Holborn (1902–1998) — John James's grandson (Labour from 1962 to 1981, SDP from 1981 to 1988, 'continuing' SDP from 1988 to 1990, crossbencher from 1990 to 1998)
- John Sainsbury, Baron Sainsbury of Preston Candover, of Preston Candover in the County of Hampshire (1927–2022) — Alan's eldest son (Conservative from 1989 to 2022)
- David Sainsbury, Baron Sainsbury of Turville, of Turville in the County of Buckinghamshire (b. 1940) — only son of Alan's only brother Robert (Labour from 1997)

The original Sainsbury's Supermarkets founder, John James Sainsbury, never officially received or held any Queen's honours.

== Alan Sainsbury, Baron Sainsbury ==
The title "Baron Sainsbury" was created on 3 May 1962 for Alan Sainsbury, a member of the third generation of the supermarket Sainsbury family. He was the first member of the Sainsbury family to be raised to the peerage, and chose the territorial designation of Drury Lane in his title, as Sainsbury's first shop was opened there in 1869. Alan Sainsbury initially took the Labour whip in the House of Lords, and died on 21 October 1998.

== John Sainsbury, Baron Sainsbury of Preston Candover ==
John Davan "JD" Sainsbury was the eldest son of Alan Sainsbury who was the first Lord Sainsbury. John, Lord Sainsbury was a member of the fourth generation of the Sainsbury family, who received his peerage on 31 July 1989 and chose the territorial designation of Preston Candover, where he lived. He took the Conservative whip in the House of Lords.

== David Sainsbury, Baron Sainsbury of Turville ==
David Sainsbury, also of the fourth generation, received his peerage on 3 October 1997, and chose the territorial designation of Turville, which is where he lives. He took the Labour whip in the House of Lords. David Sainsbury's father is Alan Sainsbury's brother Robert Sainsbury.

== Media usage of title ==
"Baron Sainsbury" or "Lord Sainsbury" properly refers to the first alone. However, these days, when people refer to "Lord Sainsbury", they usually refer to David, Lord Sainsbury of Turville (Labour) as opposed to his cousin John, Lord Sainsbury of Preston Candover (Conservative). In The Sunday Times Rich List ratings, "Lord Sainsbury" in "Lord Sainsbury and family", refers to Lord Sainsbury of Turville as he holds the largest family shareholding in the supermarket chain Sainsbury's, and not Lord Sainsbury of Preston Candover.
