= John Sainsbury =

John Sainsbury may refer to:

- John James Sainsbury (1844–1928), co-founder of the major UK supermarket chain Sainsbury's
- John Benjamin Sainsbury (1871–1956), eldest son of John James Sainsbury and Sainsbury's chairman 1928–1956
- John Sainsbury, Baron Sainsbury of Preston Candover (1927–2022), great-grandson of John James Sainsbury and Sainsbury's chairman 1969–1992
- John Sainsbury (cricketer) (1927–2004), cricketer for Somerset
