= Tim Sainsbury =

British politician and businessman

The Right Honourable Sir Timothy Sainsbury

Minister of State for Industry
- In office 14 April 1992 – 20 July 1994
- Prime Minister: John Major
- Preceded by: Alexander Hesketh

Minister of State for Trade
- In office 23 July 1990 – 14 April 1992
- Prime Minister: Margaret Thatcher; John Major
- Preceded by: David Trefgarne
- Succeeded by: Richard Needham

Parliamentary Under-Secretary of State for Foreign and Commonwealth Affairs
- In office 24 July 1989 – 23 July 1990
- Prime Minister: Margaret Thatcher
- Preceded by: Timothy Eggar
- Succeeded by: Mark Lennox-Boyd

Member of Parliament for Hove
- In office 8 November 1973 – 8 April 1997
- Preceded by: Martin Maddan
- Succeeded by: Ivor Caplin

Personal details
- Born: Timothy Alan Davan Sainsbury; 11 June 1932 (age 94)
- Party: Conservative
- Education: Worcester College, Oxford

Sir Timothy Alan Davan Sainsbury (born 11 June 1932) is a Conservative politician and businessman in the United Kingdom.

== Early life ==
Sainsbury is the youngest son of Alan Sainsbury, Baron Sainsbury, and his wife Doreen. His elder brothers are the late Lord Sainsbury of Preston Candover, a former chairman of Sainsbury's, and the late Simon Sainsbury. Lord Sainsbury of Turville, a former Labour Minister for Science, is a cousin.

His great-grandparents, John James Sainsbury and Mary Ann Staples, established a grocer's at 173 Drury Lane in 1869, which became the British supermarket chain Sainsbury's.

== Education ==
Sainsbury was educated at Sandroyd School, Eton College, and Worcester College, Oxford.

== Business career ==
Tim Sainsbury joined Sainsbury's in 1956. In 1959 he became deputy to Fred Salisbury (the first non-Sainsbury director of the company). He was appointed Director of Estates, Architects and Engineers in 1962. In this role he was in charge of converting all the remaining counter service shops to self-service, and modernising the earlier self-service shops.

When the Company listed on the London Stock Exchange on 12 July 1973, as J Sainsbury plc, his family at the time kept control with an 85% stake. Whilst his cousin, David Sainsbury, inherited his father Robert Sainsbury's entire 18% shareholding, Tim Sainsbury had to split his father Alan Sainsbury's 18% stake with his brothers JD Sainsbury and Simon Sainsbury, and so they held 6% each. It is believed that Sir Robert Sainsbury gave David Sainsbury his entire shareholding (rather than split it between David and his three daughters) so that David would have more votes at the table, considering John Davan Sainsbury, who became chairman in 1969 on Sir Robert Sainsbury's retirement, had a forceful, autocratic style of leadership, whereas David was always more cautious.

Tim Sainsbury stepped down from the board in 1983 to further pursue his career in politics. In 1992 his brother JD Sainsbury retired and was succeeded as chairman and chief executive by his cousin, David Sainsbury. Tesco overtook Sainsbury's to become the UK's largest supermarket chain in 1995. As a result, it is believed that JD Sainsbury asked Tim to re-join Sainsbury's as a non-executive director in 1995 to support David.

David stepped down in 1998 to pursue a career in politics, and in 1999, Tim stepped down as non-executive director, meaning no member of the Sainsbury family now works for the Company. At the time he vowed "to remain a major and committed shareholder."

On 13 January 2006, the company was notified that Sir Timothy Sainsbury no longer has a notifiable interest in the company's issued share capital, such interest now being below 3%. His wife, who had held the other half of his 6% stake, dropped her interest in Sainsbury's below 3% the previous week.

As of August 2009, Tim Sainsbury together with his wife were still thought to own just under 3% of the retailer. The Sainsbury family as a whole control approximately 15% of Sainsbury's.

In the Sunday Times Rich List 2008 his family fortune was estimated at £1.3 billion.

== Political career ==
Sainsbury was Conservative Member of Parliament for Hove from 1973 to 1997, and served as a junior minister, holding a number of Ministerial posts in the previous Conservative administration including those of Minister of State for Trade (1990–92) and Minister for Industry (1992–94). He was president of the Hove Conservative Association from 1998 until 2002 and was President of the Conservative Friends of Israel from 1997 until 2005. He is a Patron of the Tory Reform Group. In 2019 he announced his intention to vote Liberal Democrat at the general election.

== Charitable works ==
Sainsbury and his two brothers funded an extension to the National Gallery at a cost of around £50 million, which opened in 1991 as the Sainsbury Wing.

He was Chairman of the Somerset House Trust from 1997 until 2002, and was president of a £25m campaign for Worcester College, Oxford.

He was appointed as a trustee of the Victoria and Albert Museum on 17 December 2003 and was re-appointed on 17 December 2007. Tim Sainsbury is Chairman of the V&A's International Council, which aims to secure major donations for the FuturePlan.

== Family ==
He has two daughters, Camilla (born 1962) and Jessica (born 1970), and two sons, James (born 1962) and Alexander (born 1968). Camilla was married until late 2015 to Shaun Woodward (an MP who defected from the Conservative Party to Labour).

== Honours ==
- In 1992 he was appointed a member of the Privy Council of the United Kingdom, giving him the honorific title "The Right Honourable".
- In the 1995 New Year Honours list he was awarded a knighthood. This entitles him to be referred to as "Sir Timothy Sainsbury".

Parliament of the United Kingdom
Preceded by Martin Maddan	Member of Parliament for Hove; 1973–1997	Succeeded by Ivor Caplin
