= Sainsbury family =

Founding family of the UK supermarket chain, Sainsbury's

The Sainsbury family founded Sainsbury's, the UK's second-largest supermarket chain. Today, the family has many interests, including business, politics, philanthropy, arts, and sciences.

== Principal members of the Sainsbury family ==
Principal members of the founding family of the UK supermarket chain Sainsbury's are:

- John James Sainsbury (1844–1928), co-founder of the Sainsbury's supermarket chain
- Mary Ann Sainsbury née Staples (c1849–1927), wife of John James Sainsbury and co-founder of the Sainsbury's supermarket chain
  - John Benjamin Sainsbury (1871–1956), eldest son of John James and Mary Ann Sainsbury
    - Alan John Sainsbury, Baron Sainsbury (1902–1998), eldest son of John Benjamin Sainsbury, a Labour life peer 1962 as Lord Sainsbury, later joined the SDP.
      - John Davan Sainsbury, Baron Sainsbury of Preston Candover KG (1927–2022), eldest son of Alan Sainsbury, a Conservative life peer (Baron Sainsbury of Preston Candover), married to former ballerina Anya Linden
        - The Hon. Sarah Sainsbury, daughter of John Davan Sainsbury, married to the Hon. Robert Butler-Sloss, son of Elizabeth Butler-Sloss, Baroness Butler-Sloss
        - The Hon. John Julian Sainsbury, son of John Davan Sainsbury
        - The Hon. Mark Sainsbury, son of John Davan Sainsbury
      - The Hon. Simon Sainsbury (1930–2006), second son of Alan Sainsbury, quiet philanthropist who gave away £100 million. Entered into a civil partnership with Stewart Grimshaw shortly before his death.
      - The Right Honourable Sir Timothy Sainsbury (1932–), third son of Alan Sainsbury, former Tory MP and Minister, married to Susan Mary Sainsbury (formerly Mitchell) (b. 1939)
        - Camilla Sainsbury, daughter of Timothy Sainsbury, married to Conservative, later Labour, MP the Rt Hon. Shaun Woodward
        - James Sainsbury, son of Timothy Sainsbury
        - Alexander Sainsbury, son of Timothy Sainsbury
        - Jessica de Frankopan, daughter of Timothy Sainsbury and married to Peter de Frankopan Subic Zrinski (né Doimi de Lupis)
      - Paulette Sainsbury, only daughter of Alan Sainsbury (1946–); known by married name Paulette Anderson
        - Cairistiona Anderson, daughter of Paulette Anderson
        - Lindsey Anderson, daughter of Paulette Anderson
    - Sir Robert Sainsbury (1907–2000), son of John Benjamin Sainsbury, who, with his wife, Lisa (née Van den Bergh; 1912–2014), began the collection of modern and tribal art housed at the Sainsbury Centre for Visual Arts in Norwich had issue:
      - Elizabeth Sainsbury (Elizabeth Clark 19 July 1938 – 14 August 1977), daughter of Robert Sainsbury
        - James Jackson Clark (b. 23 February 1964), son of Elizabeth Clark
        - Alexander Simon Clark (b. 25 February 1966), son of Elizabeth Clark
      - David Sainsbury, Baron Sainsbury of Turville (1940–), son of Robert Sainsbury, Labour life peer (Baron Sainsbury of Turville), who with his wife, Susan Carroll, has issue:
        - The Hon. Clare Sainsbury, daughter of David Sainsbury, wrote Martian in the Playground, to help people understand Asperger syndrome
        - The Hon. Anya Lucy Sainsbury, daughter of David Sainsbury
        - The Hon. Francesca Sainsbury, daughter of David Sainsbury
      - Celia Sainsbury, daughter of Robert Sainsbury, married name Celia Blakey, had issue:
        - Simon Blakey, son of Celia Blakey
        - Michael Robert Blakey, son of Celia Blakey
      - Annabel Sainsbury, daughter of Robert Sainsbury, married name Annabel Kanabus, former director of the HIV/AIDS charity AVERT and later director of the charity GHE, has issue:
        - Jason Kanabus (1976–2006), son of Annabel Sainsbury, left fortune to Prince's Trust to help young people become established in farming
        - Adrian Kanabus, son of Annabel Sainsbury
  - Arthur Sainsbury (1880–1962)
    - James Sainsbury (1909–1984)

== Family involvement in Sainsbury's ==
No family member works for the company, although John Davan Sainsbury was the Life President of the firm at his death in 2022.

The last family member to work for the company was Tim Sainsbury who retired as a non-executive director in 1999.

The last family chairman was David Sainsbury who retired as chairman of the company in 1998. This brought to an end 129 years of management of the group by the Sainsbury family. As a government minister since 1998, his shares were held in a blind trust until 2007.

=== Family shareholding in Sainsbury's ===
The equity interest in Sainsbury's held by the family as of May 2011 is 15%. The family sold down their stake from 35% in 2005. The largest family shareholders are Lord Sainsbury of Turville with 4.99% and Lord Sainsbury of Preston Candover, who controls just under 3% of the company, and benefits from 1.6% of the equity included in the above. The Sunday Times reported in September 2006 that "The Sainsbury family continues to [sell] shares in the £6.2 billion retailer... and for the first time their combined holding has fallen below 20%.”

The largest shareholder is the Qatar Investment Authority, the investment vehicle of the Qatari royal family of the Gulf Kingdom, who as of May 2011 holds 25.999% of the company.

Lord Sainsbury of Preston Candover's decision to split his 3.89% holding in Sainsbury's between other members of his family in December 2006 suggests that the family may not have sold as many shares as previously thought. The other theory could be that the most senior members of the family, with previous stakes of over 3% (the reportable stock exchange shareholding threshold), could have simply transferred some of their shares to their children (who previously held few shares), rather than having sold shares onto the open market. However, some shares which have been sold were definitely sold to the open market (according to Miss Judith Portrait, the trustee for many Sainsbury family settlements).

This fall from around 35% increases the possibility of any takeover attempt succeeding. However, the Sainsbury family have managed to use their remaining stake to block takeover bids in the past, as demonstrated by the two failed takeover bids in 2007. A hostile bid for the company may encounter difficulties, without the full support of the Sainsbury family. The halving of the generous dividend yield in recent years may have been a significant factor regarding the family's decision to reduce their shareholdings.

== Buildings set up by the Sainsbury family ==
The Sainsbury family has also set up a number of buildings, to house their various interests. These are:

- Sainsbury Centre for Visual Arts Arts Centre
- Sainsbury Laboratory Science Laboratory
- Sainsbury Laboratory Cambridge University
- Sainsbury Wing Wing of the National Gallery (London)
- Sainsbury Library in the Saïd Business School at the University of Oxford
- Sainsbury African Galleries at the British Museum
- Sainsbury Exhibitions Gallery at the British Museum
- The Timothy Sainsbury Gallery at the Victoria and Albert Museum
- The Robert and Lisa Sainsbury Wing of Hammersmith Hospital
- Sainsbury-Wellcome Centre
- Linbury Galleries at Tate Britain
- Linbury Gallery at the Museum of London
- Linbury Gallery at the Royal Welsh College of Music & Drama in Cardiff
- Linbury Studio Theatre at the Royal Opera House, Covent Garden
- Linbury Studio at the London Academy of Music and Dramatic Art
- Headley Lecture Theatre in the Ashmolean Museum of Art and Archaeology at the University of Oxford
- Raven Row Art Gallery in Spitalfields
- Centre for Mental Health Centre to improve the quality of lives for people with mental health problems
- National STEM Centre
- Centre for Justice Innovation
- Astor Community Theatre in Deal, Kent

== The Sainsbury family charitable interests ==
Eighteen of the grant-making trusts set up by members of the Sainsbury family, are known collectively as the Sainsbury Family Charitable Trusts. Institutions whose creation they fostered include the following:

- Ashden
- Sainsbury Institute for Art at the University of East Anglia, comprising:
  - Sainsbury Centre for Visual Arts Arts Centre
    - The Robert and Lisa Sainsbury Collection
    - Sainsbury Research Unit for the Arts of Africa, Oceania and the Americas
  - Sainsbury Institute for the Study of Japanese Arts and Cultures
    - Lisa Sainsbury Library
  - School of Art History and World Art Studies
  - South Asian Decorative Arts and Crafts Collection Trust
- Sainsbury Laboratory Science Laboratory
- Sainsbury Management Fellowship A scheme to develop UK engineers into leaders in industry
- Institute for Government A cross-party independent charity to improve government effectiveness
- Centre for Mental Health Centre to improve the quality of lives for people with mental health problems
- Gatsby Charitable Foundation

Annabel Sainsbury (married name Annabel Kanabus) set up, with her husband, the international AIDS charity AVERT, and the charity GHE. Adrian Kanabus has set up Adrians Charity.

Celia Sainsbury (married name Celia Blakey) set up the Celia Blakey Charitable Trust which makes grants to various other charities.

The Sainsbury family are also major benefactors to English Heritage and the National Trust for Places of Historic Interest or Natural Beauty.

In 2021 The Sunday Times named the Sainsbury family among the most charitable people for the last 20 years with donations of £3.625 billion.

== Sainsbury family interests in politics ==
The Sainsbury family also has varying political interests.

- Alan Sainsbury, Baron Sainsbury was originally a Liberal, but joined the Labour Party in 1945 and sat on the party benches when appointed to the House of Lords in 1962. He defected to become a founder member of the Social Democratic Party (SDP) in 1981, and remained with the 'continuing' SDP faction, led by David Owen, following the creation of the Liberal Democrats in 1988.
- John Sainsbury, Baron Sainsbury of Preston Candover took the Conservative whip
- David Sainsbury, Baron Sainsbury of Turville also supported the SDP, but has taken the Labour whip since 1997, and was Science and Innovation Minister in the Blair government (1998–2006)
- Tim Sainsbury was Conservative MP for Hove, 1973–97
- Camilla Sainsbury, daughter of Tim, is married to former MP Shaun Woodward, who started as a Conservative but defected to Labour in 1999.
