= Territorial designation =

Geographical addendum to a British peerage title

In the United Kingdom, a territorial designation follows modern peerage titles, linking them to a specific place or places. It is also an integral part of all baronetcies. Within Scotland, a territorial designation proclaims a relationship with a particular area of land.

== English and British peerages ==
A territorial designation is an aspect of the creation of modern peerages that links them to a specific place or places, at least one of which is almost always in the United Kingdom. It is given in the patent of creation after the actual peerage title itself, of which it is not considered a part.

=== Life peerages ===
With the exception of royal peerages, which are often created without them, territorial designations are used with the creation of almost all baronies and viscountcies. For instance, the life peerage conferred (in 1992) on the former Prime Minister Margaret Thatcher was created as:

Baroness Thatcher, of Kesteven in the County of Lincolnshire.

The life peerage for former Prime Minister James Callaghan (in 1987) was created as:

Baron Callaghan of Cardiff, of the City of Cardiff in the County of South Glamorgan.

The part of the peerage before the comma is the actual title, and the part after the comma is the territorial designation. These peers should therefore be referred to as "The Baroness Thatcher" and "The Lord Callaghan of Cardiff": it is incorrect both to use part of the territorial designation as part of the title and to leave out part of the actual title; thus The Baroness Thatcher of Kesteven and The Lord Callaghan are incorrect, although the latter may be used informally.

The place of the comma can be particularly important when dealing with peers with the same names. For instance, Baron Sainsbury refers to Alan Sainsbury who was Baron Sainsbury, of Drury Lane in the Borough of Holborn (created in 1962). This life peerage of Baron Sainsbury had been created and anyone else wanting to use this title would need to add a territorial designation in order to create a different peerage. Hence his son, John Sainsbury, was created (in 1989) as Baron Sainsbury of Preston Candover, of Preston Candover in the County of Hampshire, while his nephew, David Sainsbury, was created (in 1997) as Baron Sainsbury of Turville, of Turville in the County of Buckinghamshire.

Hence the distinction needs to be made between different peers with similar or the same surnames so that there can be no confusion. This can be especially important if peers with similar names sit in the House of Lords at the same time, as seen in the distinction made between Baron Hunt (1966–98), Baron Hunt of Fawley (1973–87), Baron Hunt of Tanworth (1980-2008), Baron Hunt of Wirral (created in 1997), Baron Hunt of Kings Heath (created in 1997), and Baron Hunt of Chesterton (created in 2000).

=== Baronies and viscountcies ===
Until the 19th century, it was possible to create a different peerage title merely by altering the location of the comma. Thus the title Baron Stanley, of Bickerstaffe in the County Palatine of Lancaster (created in 1832) differs in format from Baron Stanley of Alderley, in the County of Chester (created in 1839) only by the placement of the comma. The former title is Baron Stanley whilst the latter is Baron Stanley of Alderley.

However, this format is now no longer used: if a peerage title in the format "Baron Surname of Place" is wanted, the full territorial designation must be used. Thus if the Barony of Stanley of Alderley were created today, it would be created as Baron Stanley of Alderley, of Alderley in the County of Chester. This dual usage of the same term in the title and in the territorial designation may appear peculiar, but is a regular occurrence, with one recent example being Adair Turner, who was (in 2005) created Baron Turner of Ecchinswell, of Ecchinswell in the County of Hampshire. Though this dual usage (or repetition) in both title and territorial designation is not a requirement to create a title in the form of "Baron Surname of Place" as illustrated in the example of Gerry Grimstone who was created (in 2020) as Baron Grimstone of Boscobel, of Belgravia in the City of Westminster.

=== Earldoms, marquessates and dukedoms ===
Creations of the higher ranks of the peerage (earl, marquess and duke) often used to include territorial designations, but this has varied and such creations now rarely do. For example: the Duke of Wellington, in the County of Somerset (created in 1814) and the Duke of Gordon, of Gordon Castle in Scotland (created in 1876) were created with territorial designations but the Duke of Fife (created in 1899) was not.

The Marquess of Cholmondeley, in the County Palatine of Chester (created in 1815) and Marquess of Ailsa, of the Isle of Ailsa in the County of Ayr (created in 1831) were accorded territorial designations but the Marquess of Zetland (created in 1892) was not. Likewise, the Earl of Craven, in the County of York (created in 1801) and the Earl Nelson, of Trafalgar and of Merton in the County of Surrey (created in 1805) differ in this respect to the Earl of Stockton (created in 1984).

=== Multiple designations ===
Some territorial designations name more than one place, and the format used depends on whether such places are in the same county or other administrative division. For instance, the life peerage conferred on Margaret McDonagh was created (in 2004) as Baroness McDonagh, of Mitcham and of Morden in the London Borough of Merton.

The life peerage conferred on John Morris was created (in 2001) as Baron Morris of Aberavon, of Aberavon in the County of West Glamorgan and of Ceredigion in the County of Dyfed. This also extends to naming two places, such as in the life peerage conferred on William McCrea who was created (in 2018) as Baron McCrea of Magherafelt and Cookstown, of Magherafelt in the County of Londonderry and of Cookstown in the County of Tyrone.

=== Overseas and victory designations ===
Occasionally, a place outside the United Kingdom can be named. For instance, the life peerage conferred on Howard Florey was created (in 1965) as Baron Florey, of Adelaide in the Commonwealth of Australia and of Marston in the County of Oxford; and that conferred on Sue Ryder was created (in 1979) as Baroness Ryder of Warsaw, of Warsaw in Poland and of Cavendish in the County of Suffolk. Another, more recent example is the life peerage conferred on Martha Osamor was created (in 2018) as Baroness Osamor, of Tottenham in the London Borough of Haringey and of Asaba in the Republic of Nigeria.

In the case of a victory title, at least one term usually refers to the site of the grantee's triumph, usually outside the United Kingdom. For example, the famous admiral Horatio Nelson was created (in 1801) as Viscount Nelson, of the Nile and of Burnham Thorpe in the County of Norfolk, the Nile being the site of his victory against the French in the Battle of the Nile, and Burnham Thorpe being his place of birth.

== English and British baronetcies ==
Provision of a territorial designation is also an integral part of all baronetcies.

== Scotland ==
Recognition of a territorial designation may also be granted in Scotland by the Lord Lyon to Scottish armigers who own (or were born in or were associated with) named land, generally outside a town (i.e. a rural location). The Lord Lyon advises that for a territorial designation to be recognised, there must be 'ownership of a substantial area of land to which a well-attested name attaches, that is to say, ownership of an “estate”, or farm or, at the very least, a house with policies extending to five acres or thereby'. The territorial designation in this case is considered to be an indivisible part of the name, though not necessarily an indicator of ancestral or feudal nobility, though recognition of a territorial designation is usually accorded alongside the grant or matriculation of a coat of arms, which confers 'noblesse' status. A substantive territorial designation holder is understood to be the "Head of the Territorial House of [designation]". For example a John Smith of Abercrombie is the head of the territorial house of Smith of Abercrombie.

A person bearing a Scottish territorial designation is either a baron, chief or chieftain or a laird, the latter denoting 'landowner', or is a descendant of one of the same. The Lord Lyon is the ultimate arbiter as to determining entitlement to a territorial designation, and his right of discretion in recognising these, and their status as a name, dignity or title, has been confirmed in the Scottish courts.

According to Debrett's and other references, a John Smith of Abercrombie is addressed as simply Abercrombie. If he is a clan chief, he may be addressed by either the place name or the surname of his clan.

== See also ==
- Nobiliary particle
- Toponymic surname
