= Simon Sainsbury =

British philanthropist

The Honourable Simon Sainsbury

Personal details
- Born: Simon David Davan Sainsbury; 1 March 1930 London, England
- Died: 27 September 2006 (aged 76)
- Domestic partner: Stewart Grimshaw
- Relations: Sir Robert Sainsbury (uncle)
- Parent: Alan Sainsbury, Baron Sainsbury
- Education: Sandroyd School; Eton College
- Alma mater: Trinity College, Cambridge
- Occupation: Businessman and philanthropist

Simon David Davan Sainsbury (1 March 1930 – 27 September 2006) was a British businessman, philanthropist and art collector.

== Early life ==
Sainsbury was born in London, the middle son of Alan Sainsbury and his wife Doreen. His brothers are John; Timothy, former Conservative Minister of Trade. David Sainsbury, Labour life peer and Minister for Science, is a cousin. His great-grandfather, John James Sainsbury, established a grocer's at 173 Drury Lane in 1869 which became the British supermarket chain Sainsbury's.

Sainsbury was educated at Sandroyd School, Eton College, where he became head of his house and President of the Eton Society ("Pop"). A keen sportsman, he was selected for the Eton-Harrow match at Lord's in 1947 as a bowler; sent in as a nightwatchman, he scored a century. After National Service as "sports officer" in the Life Guards, he studied history at Trinity College, Cambridge.

== Career ==
Sainsbury trained as a chartered accountant after leaving university. He joined the finance department of the family company, then known as J. Sainsbury, in 1956 and became a director in 1959, responsible for finance. When his brother John became chairman of Sainsbury's in 1969, Simon was given the deputy chairmanship. In 1973, it was Simon who steered the company through what became the largest ever floatation on the London Stock Exchange.

=== Charitable works ===
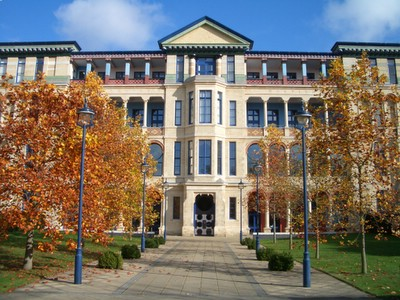
The Judge Business School, established using Sainsbury funds

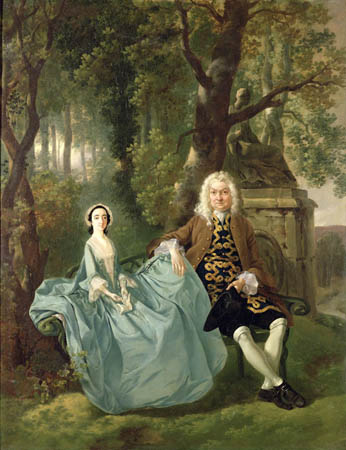
Mr and Mrs Carter of Bullingdon House, Bulmer, Essex by Thomas Gainsborough, one of the older paintings in the bequest

He established The Monument Trust in 1965, which gave grants of more than £100 million over the following 40 years. The Trust supported the Georgian Society. In 1990, he made a donation via The Monument Trust of £5 million to his alma mater, Cambridge University, which used the money to convert the old Addenbrooke's Hospital building on Trumpington Street in Cambridge into what was to become Cambridge Judge Business School. Following riots in 1991, the Trust was also involved in renovations of the Meadow Well housing estate in North Tyneside. More recently, it funded an extension of the Pallant House Gallery in Chichester to house the large art collection of Sir Colin St John Wilson. Simon Sainsbury also personally supported research into HIV and AIDS. He and his brothers funded an extension to the National Gallery, London at a cost of around £50 million, which opened in 1991 as the Sainsbury Wing. The Trust also supported the British Museum, the Royal Academy, the Campaign to Protect Rural England, the Landmark Trust, the Tate Gallery, the Victoria and Albert Museum, the Fitzwilliam Museum in Cambridge, and the restoration of Christ Church Spitalfields. The Daylit Gallery at the Victoria and Albert Museum is named in his honour. He was a trustee of the Wallace Collection from 1977 to 1997, and a trustee of the National Gallery from 1991 to 1998. He also supported the National Theatre and the Royal Opera House. He refused all public honours, and declined an entry in Who's Who.

== Personal life ==
Near the end of his life, Sainsbury entered into a civil partnership with his partner of 40 years, Stewart Grimshaw, a restaurateur and bookseller. He suffered from Parkinson's disease in his later years, and ultimately suffered a fall which caused his death.

Upon his death in 2006, Sainsbury bequeathed the cream of his art collection to the National Gallery and the Tate. The combined value of the paintings in the bequest has been estimated at £100 million. In 2008, the National Gallery received five works, by Claude Monet, Edgar Degas, Paul Gauguin, and Henri Rousseau, and the Tate thirteen, including works by Balthus and Lucian Freud. Sir Nicholas Serota, the director of the latter institution, called the bequest "one of the most important gifts in the history of Tate".
