= Flowers Wood =

Community in England

- Location within Warwickshire
- Interactive map of Flowers Wood

Geography
- Location: Warwickshire, England
- OS grid: SP223426
- Coordinates: 52.0813°N 1.6754°W
- Area: 1.67 hectares (4.13 acres)

Administration
- Authority: Woodland Trust

Flowers Wood is a community woodland near Ilmington in Warwickshire, England. It covers a total area of 1.67 hectares (4.13 acres). It is owned and managed by the Woodland Trust. It was one of 200 "Woods on Your Doorstep" created by the Woodland Trust to mark the year 2000 in conjunction with the Millennium Commission, the Forestry Commission and the Sainsbury Family Charitable Trusts.
