= David Sainsbury, Baron Sainsbury of Turville =

British businessman and philanthropist

The Right Honourable The Lord Sainsbury of Turville HonFRS HonFREng
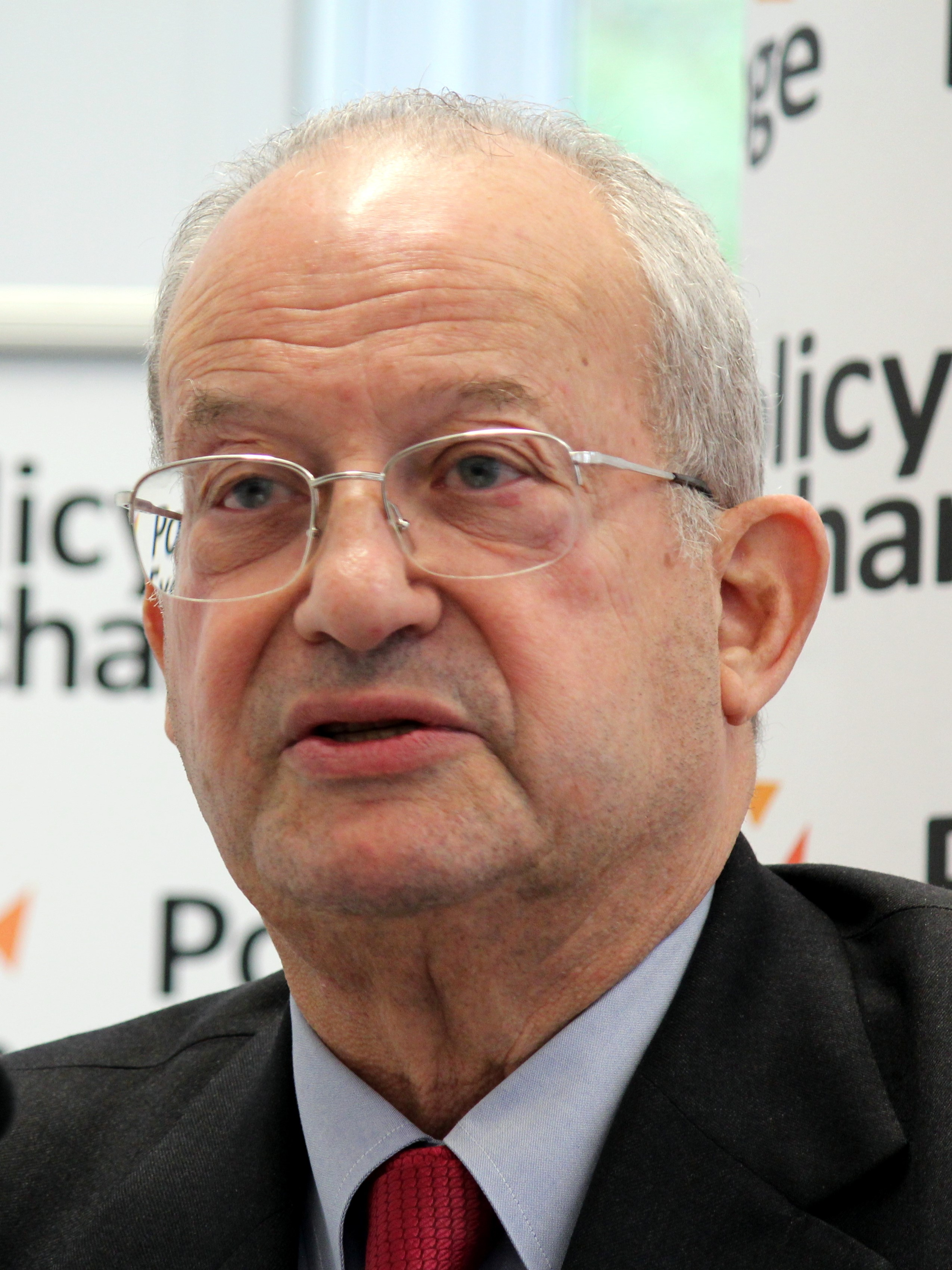
- Sainsbury in 2013

Chancellor of the University of Cambridge
- In office 16 October 2011 – 24 July 2025
- Preceded by: The Duke of Edinburgh
- Succeeded by: The Lord Smith of Finsbury

Parliamentary Under-Secretary of State for Science and Innovation
- In office 27 July 1998 – 10 November 2006
- Prime Minister: Tony Blair
- Preceded by: John Battle
- Succeeded by: Malcolm Wicks

Member of the House of Lords
- Lord Temporal
- Life peerage 3 October 1997 – 1 July 2021

Personal details
- Born: David John Sainsbury; 24 October 1940 (age 86)
- Party: Labour (1960s–81; since 1996); SDP (1981–88) 'Continuing' SDP (1988–90)
- Spouse(s): Susan Carroll, Lady Sainsbury, DBE
- Relations: Alan Sainsbury (uncle)
- Parent(s): Robert Sainsbury (father); Lisa van den Bergh (mother)
- Education: King's College, Cambridge (BA); Columbia University (MBA)
- Occupation: Politician
- Profession: Businessman, philanthropist

David John Sainsbury, Baron Sainsbury of Turville (born 24 October 1940) is a British politician, businessman and philanthropist. From 1992 to 1997, he served as chairman of Sainsbury's, the supermarket chain established by his great-grandfather John James Sainsbury in 1869.

He was made a life peer in 1997 as a member of the Labour Party, and was on a leave of absence from the House of Lords from 15 July 2013 to his retirement in 2021. He served in the government as Parliamentary Under-Secretary of State for Science and Innovation from 1998 and 2006.

He is a major donor to the University of Cambridge and, in 2011, was elected Chancellor of the University of Cambridge. He also made the largest real-terms donation in British political history, giving £8 million (equivalent to £11.6 million in 2025) to the Liberal Democrats in 2019, only surpassed in nominal-terms by the £9 million donation made by Christopher Harborne to Reform UK in 2025.

== Early life and business career ==
The son of Sir Robert Sainsbury (1906–2000) and Lisa Ingeborg (née van den Bergh; 1912–2014), Sainsbury attended Eton College before going on to earn a degree in History and Psychology at King's College, Cambridge. He then completed an MBA at Columbia Business School in the United States.

Sainsbury joined the family firm, then known as J. Sainsbury Ltd., in 1963, working in the personnel department. He became a director in 1966. He was Financial Controller from 1971 to 1973, just before the company's flotation.

When the company listed on the London Stock Exchange on 12 July 1973, at the time the largest flotation ever, his family retained control with an 85% stake. His father, Sir Robert Sainsbury, gave almost his entire stake in the company to David Sainsbury, his only son, whereas his uncle Alan Sainsbury split his stake in the business between his sons John Davan Sainsbury, Simon Sainsbury, and Tim Sainsbury. John Davan Sainsbury became chairman in 1969 on Sir Robert Sainsbury's retirement.

He was the group's Finance Director from 1973 to 1990, during which time the company grew rapidly. He was chairman of Savacentre from 1984 to 1993, during which time the hypermarkets business grew slowly. He was deputy chairman from 1988 to 1992. On JD Sainsbury's retirement as chairman and chief executive on 2 November 1992, David Sainsbury became chairman.

In 1996, Sainsbury's announced its first drop in profits in 22 years, and the first of three profits warnings during his chairmanship was issued. Although there were senior management changes, which included David relinquishing the chief executive's role to Dino Adriano and becoming non-executive chairman, there were no new directors or outsiders appointed to the senior management team. Profits fell the next year, but rose in 1998. At this point, David Sainsbury, who had wanted to step down at the end of 1997, made a surprise announcement of his retirement as chairman to pursue his long-held ambition to have a career in politics, after "32 enjoyable and fulfilling years" working for Sainsbury's. Sainsbury's share price increased on the day of this announcement.

On his retirement as chairman, to avoid any conflict of interest, David Sainsbury placed his then 23% stake in Sainsbury's into a "blind" trust, to be administered by lawyer Judith Portrait. When David Sainsbury announced his intention to give away £1 billion to charity in 2005, his 23% stake was sold down, eventually to 12.9% by early 2007. His beneficial holding became just 7.75% when he regained control of his shares in February 2007 following his decision to step down as Parliamentary Under-Secretary of State for Science and Innovation in November 2006. During the private equity takeover bid in the first half of 2007, David indicated he was willing to let the Sainsbury's board open its books for due diligence if someone offered him a price of 600 pence per share or more.

David Sainsbury retains a sizeable shareholding in his family's supermarket chain (around 5.85%). To further his philanthropy interests, he placed 92million of his shares (representing 5.28% of the company's share capital), into his investment vehicle, Innotech Advisers Ltd (which donates all its dividends to charity), meaning his beneficial stake is just 0.57% (lower than JD's 1.6% beneficial interest). The Sainsbury family as a whole control approximately 15% of Sainsbury's. In the Sunday Times Rich List 2008 his family fortune was estimated at £1.3 billion.

== Political career ==
Sainsbury joined the Labour Party in the 1960s, but was one of the 100 signatories of the 'Limehouse Declaration' in an advertisement in The Guardian on 5 February 1981; he went on to be a member of the Social Democratic Party (SDP) formed by the authors of the Declaration. Following the 1983 election, he prompted the party to give more priority to recruiting members and finding a firm financial base; he was by far the biggest donor to the party, and a trustee, giving about £750,000 between 1981 and 1987. His donations were typically earmarked to specific projects rather than general day-to-day operations.

Along with David Owen, Sainsbury opposed merging the SDP with the Liberal Party following the 1987 election, and provided office space for Owen to help him re-establish a separate political party, which was created in 1988. The 'continuing' SDP was wound up in 1990, and Sainsbury changed allegiance back to the Labour Party, rejoining them in 1996. A year later, following the Labour Party's election victory, he entered the House of Lords as a Labour peer, being created Baron Sainsbury of Turville, of Turville in the County of Buckinghamshire, on 3 October 1997.

Between 1996, the year he rejoined Labour, and 2006, when he stood down as a government minister, Sainsbury donated £16 million to the Labour Party, usually in batches of £1 million or £2 million each year. He donated a further £2 million on 7 September 2007, stating that he was impressed by Gordon Brown's leadership and believed "that Labour is the only party which is committed to delivering both social justice and economic prosperity". He gave another £500,000 on 15 December 2008, making a total of £18.5 million. He is associated with the Labour Friends of Israel.

In April 2006, it was reported Sainsbury "faced a possible probe into an alleged breach of the ministerial code after admitting he had failed to disclose a £2 million loan he had made to the Labour Party – despite publicly stating that he had." He subsequently apologised for "unintentionally" misleading the public, blaming a mix-up between the £2 million loan and a £2 million donation he had made earlier.

In July 2006, he became the first government minister to be questioned by police in the "Cash for Peerages" inquiry. On 10 November 2006, he resigned as Science Minister, stating that he wanted to focus on business and charity work. He categorically denied that his resignation had anything to do with the "Cash for Peerages" affair, although this was contradicted by subsequent press reports attributed to "Labour insiders" which suggested that his resignation was indeed a direct consequence of the affair.

From July 1998 to November 2006, he held the office of Parliamentary Under-Secretary of State for Science and Innovation at the Department of Trade and Industry, serving in the House of Lords and accepting no salary.

Because of his importance to the Labour Party as a donor, contemporary press reports described him as "unsackable". He has argued that there are "far too many reshuffles", and that there were considerable benefits to his remaining in post for so long.

Sainsbury has also been associated with the Institute for Public Policy Research and Progress. Between 2001 and 2011 he provided £2 million of funding for Progress. In 2009, he created the Institute for Government with £15 million of funding through the Gatsby Charitable Foundation to help government and opposition politicians to prepare for political transitions and government. He donated £390,000 to Progress and the Movement for Change between December 2011 and April 2013, while he was not on a UK electoral register, which is contrary to electoral law, leading to Progress and the Movement for Change being fined by the Electoral Commission.

Sainsbury funded the "Remain" side of the 2016 European Union membership referendum campaign, giving £2,150,000 to the Labour and £2,125,000 to the Liberal Democrats "Remain" campaigns.

After the 2017 general election, Sainsbury announced he would no longer provide financial backing to party political causes, but will donate to charitable causes. During 2016 he had donated £260,000 to Progress in addition to backing "Remain" organisations. However, in late 2018 he donated £25,000 to Scottish Conservatives MP Luke Graham.

In 2018, Sainsbury provided core funding for the centre-left think tank Policy Network.

During the 2019 United Kingdom general election campaign Sainsbury donated £8 million to the Liberal Democrats, over half the party's election funding, making its election donations larger than the Labour Party's.

Sainsbury has been a long-time patron of the socialist society Scientists for Labour.

He ranked 14 out of 50 on the Top 50 Influential Lib Dems of 2020 list – the only non-Lib Dem member to feature.

== Charitable works ==
Sainsbury founded the Gatsby Charitable Foundation in 1967. In 1993, he donated £200 million of Sainsbury's shares to the Foundation's assets. By 2009 the foundation had given £660 million to a range of charitable causes. In 2009, he allocated a further £465 million to the foundation, making him the first Briton to donate more than £1 billion to charity. He set up the Sainsbury Management Fellowship scheme in 1987 to develop UK engineers into leaders in industry.

In 2003 Sainsbury was granted the Andrew Carnegie Medal for Philanthropy.

Sainsbury has donated £127 million of the Gatsby Charitable Foundation's money to the University of Cambridge in the last decade: he gave £45 million to the Cambridge University Botanic Garden in 2005. In 2011, Cambridge's Sainsbury Laboratory opened, paid for by an £82 million donation from the Gatsby Foundation made in 2008. It was said by the Financial Times to be "one of the biggest donations ever made to a British university ... surpassed only by a 2000 gift to the university by the Bill and Melinda Gates Foundation."

In 2013, together with his wife Susie, he joined the Giving Pledge, the group started by Warren Buffett and Bill and Melinda Gates, pledging to donate half his fortune to charitable trusts during his lifetime.

== Chancellor of the University of Cambridge ==
In 2011, Sainsbury was formally proposed by the Nominations Board of Cambridge University to succeed the Duke of Edinburgh as Chancellor of the University of Cambridge. If his election had not been contested by 17 June, he would have assumed office on 1 July. However, his nomination became the first in 163 years to be contested by another candidate when, on 29 May, local shopkeeper Abdul Arain stood in protest at a planning application for a Sainsbury's Local branch in Cambridge's Mill Road district, triggering a contest that would have to wait until an October ballot. Four days later, a group of Cambridge University alumni successfully drafted actor Brian Blessed as an alternative candidate. On 20 June, socialist barrister Michael Mansfield became the third candidate to oppose Sainsbury. An election took place on 14 and 15 October 2011 in which Sainsbury won with 52% of the votes (2893 votes out of 5558) on a 2.5% turnout and he was confirmed to the position on 16 October 2011.

On 2 February 2024, the university announced that Sainsbury had advised of his intention to step down later in the year from his role as Chancellor.

== Personal life ==
Sainsbury and his wife, Susan Carroll (née Reid), a former teacher, have three daughters. Lady Sainsbury is a Trustee of the Royal Academy of Music. She was appointed DBE in the 2022 Birthday Honours, for "services to the Arts, particularly during Covid-19", described in the list as "Philanthropist". The family live in the Manor of Turville in Turville, Buckinghamshire. The Manor once belonged to the abbey at St Albans, but was seized by the Crown in the Dissolution of the Monasteries in 1547. The manor house has since been rebuilt as Turville Park, a fine stately home in the village.

Sainsbury's elder sister was Mrs Elizabeth Clark (19 July 1938 – 14 August 1977), and his younger sisters are Celia and Annabel. He is the nephew of Alan Sainsbury. His cousins have included Simon Sainsbury, Conservative peer John Sainsbury, Baron Sainsbury of Preston Candover, KG, and former Conservative MP Sir Tim Sainsbury. His great-grandparents, John James Sainsbury and Mary Ann Staples, established a grocer's at 173 Drury Lane in 1869 which became the British supermarket chain Sainsbury's.

== Academic titles ==
- In 1994, Sainsbury was appointed as an Honorary Fellow of the Royal Academy of Engineering.
- In 2001, he was elected an international member of the American Philosophical Society.
- In 2003, he was elected to the American Academy of Arts and Sciences.
- In 2007, he was awarded an honorary degree in science by University College London.
- In 2007, he was awarded an honorary doctorate from Heriot-Watt University.
- In 2008, he was awarded an honorary degree in science by the University of Bath.
- In 2008, he was made an honorary fellow of the Royal Society.

== See also ==
- List of billionaires

Academic offices
Preceded by The Duke of Edinburgh	Chancellor of the University of Cambridge; 2011–2025	Succeeded by The Lord Smith of Finsbury
Orders of precedence in the United Kingdom
Preceded by The Lord Blackwell	Gentlemen; Baron Sainsbury of Turville	Followed by The Lord Cope of Berkeley
