= John Benjamin Sainsbury =

Son of John James Sainsbury (1871–1956)

- Born: 1871; London, England
- Died: 23 May 1956 (aged 84–85)
- Known for: businessman, eldest son of Sainsbury's supermarket chain founder John James Sainsbury
- Spouse: Mabel Van den Bergh
- Parent(s): John James Sainsbury, Mary Ann Sainsbury

John Benjamin Sainsbury (1871 – 23 May 1956) was the eldest son of John James Sainsbury, the founder of the Sainsbury's supermarket chain, and his wife, Mary Ann Sainsbury.

== Early and private life ==
John Benjamin Sainsbury was the second child of John James and Mary Ann Sainsbury and was born in 1871 above the Drury Lane shop and from an early age was trained to take over from his father at the head of the firm.

John Benjamin Sainsbury married Mabel Van den Bergh, an heiress from a Dutch Jewish family whose fortune was made in margarine. They had two sons, Alan Sainsbury and Robert Sainsbury. Alan Sainsbury joined the family firm in the same year as his youngest uncle (John Benjamin Sainsbury's youngest brother, Paul Sainsbury), who was almost 20 years younger than John Benjamin Sainsbury. Both Alan Sainsbury and Paul Sainsbury joined Sainsbury's in 1921. John Benjamin Sainsbury's sons, Alan and Robert, built the reputation of the business for quality and innovation. Having inherited both Victorian and Jewish traditions of philanthropy, they also set the tone of the family's prevailing left-liberal social conscience.

== Business career ==
John Benjamin Sainsbury ran the business in partnership with his father from 1915, and became a director of the newly formed Company 'J. Sainsbury Ltd.' in 1922 and chairman in 1928 after his father's death.

‘Mr John’ as he became known was the keenest of the brothers and took on a range of responsibilities within Sainsbury’s: the bacon and ham departments and the buying of lamb and Ostend rabbits, the development of new shops and the maintenance of existing ones, recruiting staff and managing vehicles and stables.

John Benjamin maintained high standards and received weekly reports on each branch from a network of inspectors. Sainsbury’s Branch Management department changed its name to the Shop Services department overnight after Mr John pointed out that he was the branch management department. Even during the uncertain times of rapidly rising prices at the outbreak of war in 1914 he insisted that all food be clearly labelled.

He also played a key role in Sainsbury’s expansion during the 1920s and 1930s, visiting potential new store sites with his family at weekends and conducting his own market research. He expanded it into a chain of 250 grocery outlets throughout the south of England, East Anglia and the Midlands.

He died in office on 23 May 1956.
