= Alan Sainsbury, Baron Sainsbury =

British business executive (1902–1998)

The Right Honourable The Lord Sainsbury

Member of the House of Lords Lord Temporal
- In office 3 May 1962 – 21 October 1998 as a life peer

Personal details
- Born: Alan John Sainsbury; 13 August 1902
- Died: 21 October 1998 (aged 96)
- Party: Liberal (1929–45); Labour (1945–81); SDP (1981–88) 'Continuing' SDP (1988–90)
- Spouses: Doreen Davan Adams (m. 1925; div. 1939) Anne Lewy (m. 1944; died 1988)
- Relations: Sir Robert Sainsbury (brother)
- Parent: John Benjamin Sainsbury
- Occupation: Businessman, politician and peer

Alan John Sainsbury, Baron Sainsbury (13 August 1902 – 21 October 1998), was a British business executive and a leading member of the Sainsbury retail dynasty.

== Early and private life ==
Sainsbury was the son of Mabel Miriam (née Van den Bergh) and John Benjamin Sainsbury. His paternal grandparents, John James Sainsbury and Mary Ann Staples, established a grocer's at 173 Drury Lane in 1869 which became the British supermarket chain Sainsbury's. His father was John Benjamin Sainsbury, while his mother, the daughter of Jacob Van den Bergh, was from a Dutch Jewish family.

He and his first wife, Doreen, with whom he married in 1925 had three sons:

- John Sainsbury, Baron Sainsbury of Preston Candover
- Simon David Davan Sainsbury
- Timothy, later Sir Timothy Alan Davan Sainsbury

He later remarried in 1944 and had a daughter, Paulette. As he was divorced from his first wife, he spent little time with his sons John Davan, Simon and Timothy, and so they only got to know their father when they joined the family firm.

On 3 May 1962, he was the first of three members of the Sainsbury family to receive a life peerage. He took the title Baron Sainsbury, of Drury Lane in the Borough of Holborn. As the first peerage using the family name, the territorial designation – referencing the location of the family's first shop – did not form part of the title. When Alan's son John became a peer in 1989, he took the title Baron Sainsbury of Preston Candover to differentiate between them. In the same way, when Alan's nephew David was ennobled in 1997 he was made Baron Sainsbury of Turville.

== Business career ==
Educated at Haileybury College, Alan joined Sainsbury's in 1921 aged 17, the same year his youngest uncle, Paul Sainsbury, joined the family firm. He began his career working alongside his uncles as a buyer. He became a director of the Company, then known as J. Sainsbury Ltd., in 1933 and became joint managing director of Sainsbury's with his brother Robert Sainsbury in 1938 after his father, John Benjamin Sainsbury (the eldest son of Sainsbury's founder John James Sainsbury), had a minor heart attack. He was always known to the Sainsbury's workforce as 'Mr Alan'.

Alan Sainsbury was instrumental in bringing the self-service supermarket to Britain and shaping many of the conditions by which we shop for food today. On a trip to America he saw the experience of self-service supermarkets, and John James Sainsbury's show-piece Croydon branch of Sainsbury's was converted to self-service in 1950. On handing out wire baskets on opening day, one customer was so annoyed she threw a basket in Alan Sainsbury's face, and one member of staff refused to be an assistant in a self-service supermarket. When the original shop at 173 Drury Lane later closed, the manager, Mr Pawsey, handed Alan Sainsbury the key, saying, 'Your grandfather opened this shop, and I think it's only right that you should close it'.

In 1956, Sainsbury became chairman after the death of his father, John Benjamin. As chairman, he pioneered fresh and frozen foods, and increased Sainsbury's own label range. He introduced oven-ready frozen chickens and the simple but powerful slogan "Good Food Costs Less at Sainsbury's" in 1959. Sainsbury's also released its first public relations video in 1964. He retired as chairman in 1967 to be replaced by his brother Sir Robert, and became Life President. Upon Sir Robert's retirement in 1969, Alan's son John became chairman. Sir Robert was then appointed Joint Life President of the retailer along with his brother.

By this time Sainsbury's boasted 244 UK grocery stores (162 self-service shops and 82 counter service stores). The average size of new supermarkets was 8,120 sq ft (754 m^{2}). The range of products had increased from 350 to 4,000 (including 1,500 own brand products). In 1969 sales reached £166m and profit before tax was £4.3m. The Company also boasted the highest sales per square foot in the food retailing industry and the market share of the UK supermarket business was 2.5%, turning Sainsbury's into a medium-sized, regional business in London and the South-East. When the company was listed on the London Stock Exchange on 12 July 1973, as J Sainsbury plc. (which was at the time the largest flotation ever), his family retained control with an 85% stake. Alan Sainsbury split his 18% stake in the business between his sons John, Simon and Tim, each holding 6%, while his brother Sir Robert gave his entire 18% stake to his only son, David.

== Political career ==
Alan Sainsbury first entered politics by standing as a Liberal parliamentary candidate at Sudbury in the 1929, 1931 and 1935 general elections, before joining the Labour Party in 1945. A supporter of Hugh Gaitskell, he was one of a trio of wealthy benefactors (the others were Henry Walston and Charles Forte) who provided covert funding for both the short-lived socialist newspaper Forward and the Gaitskellite pressure group the Campaign for Democratic Socialism. Upon being made a life peer in 1962 he sat on the Labour benches.

In February 1981, he was one of 100 prominent supporters of the 'Gang of Four', who had broken away from Labour to form the Social Democratic Party (SDP). When the SDP split in 1988, Sainsbury was among those who joined David Owen in forming a new 'continuing' SDP, where he remained until that party's dissolution in 1990. Although his nephew David also became a member of the 'continuing' SDP, his son John elected to take the Conservative whip when made a peer in 1989, thereby sitting in opposition to his father.

== Sources ==
- Alan Sainsbury, Lord Sainsbury of Drury Lane, Sainsburyarchive.org.uk. Accessed 7 September 2022.
