= John Sainsbury, Baron Sainsbury of Preston Candover =

British businessman and politician (1927–2022)

The Right Honourable The Lord Sainsbury of Preston Candover KG
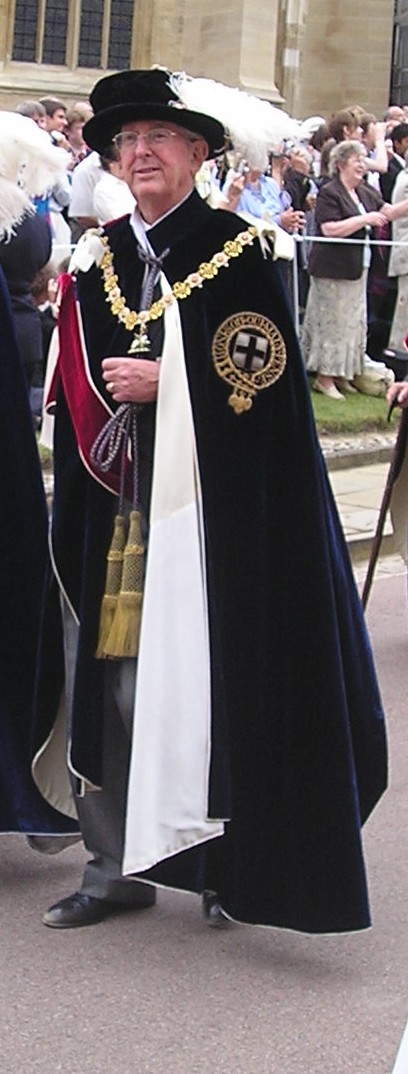
- Lord Sainsbury in the robes of a Knight Companion of the Garter

Member of the House of Lords
- Lord Temporal
- Life peerage 31 January 1989 – 14 January 2022

Personal details
- Born: John Davan Sainsbury; 2 November 1927 Chelsea, London, England
- Died: 14 January 2022 (aged 94) Preston Candover, Hampshire, England
- Party: Conservative
- Spouse: Anya Linden
- Parent: Alan Sainsbury
- Relatives: Robert Sainsbury (uncle)
- Education: Worcester College, Oxford
- Known for: Businessman, politician and peer

John Davan Sainsbury, Baron Sainsbury of Preston Candover (2 November 1927 – 14 January 2022) was a British businessman and politician. He served as the President of Sainsbury's, and sat in the House of Lords as a life peer and member of the Conservative Party.

== Early life and education ==
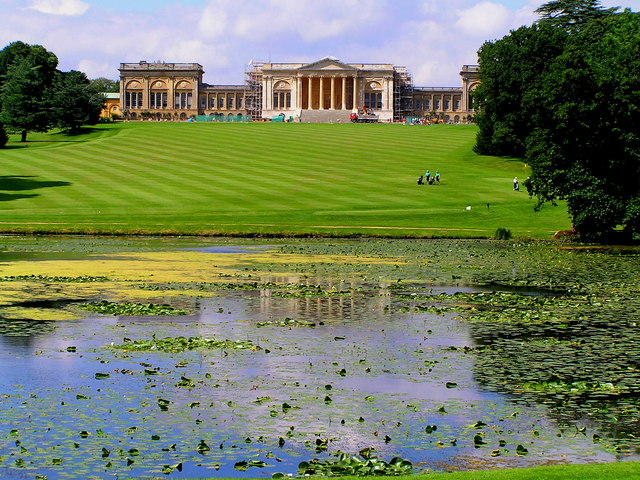
Stowe School

John Davan Sainsbury was born in Chelsea, London, on 2 November 1927, the son of Alan Sainsbury, Baron Sainsbury, and the nephew of Sir Robert Sainsbury. His younger brothers were Simon and Timothy, former Conservative Minister of Trade; David Sainsbury, former Labour Minister for Science, was a cousin. His great-grandparents, John James Sainsbury and Mary Ann Staples, established a grocer's at 173 Drury Lane in 1869 which became the British supermarket chain Sainsbury's. When working for Sainsbury's he was sometimes referred to as "Mr JD Sainsbury".

Sainsbury was Head Boy of Sandroyd School, before heading to Stowe School and then Worcester College, Oxford, where he studied History.

== Business career ==
Sainsbury joined Sainsbury's in 1950 (the year the first self-service store opened in Croydon), working in the grocery department. The next year he became a buyer. He later became in charge of many other aspects of the business, including bacon buying in 1956. He became a director of the company, then known as J. Sainsbury Ltd., in 1958, becoming deputy chairman in 1967 following his father Alan Sainsbury's retirement.

He took over from his uncle Sir Robert Sainsbury as chairman and chief executive in 1969. At the time, although Sainsbury's had always been the largest UK grocery retailer by market share since 1922, Tesco's profits were double those of Sainsbury's, and Marks & Spencer's were nine times those of Sainsbury's.

Sainsbury led the company on to the London Stock Exchange on 12 July 1973, which was at the time the largest flotation ever. Dubbed "the sale of the century" by the press, his family at the time retained control with an 85% stake. While his cousin David Sainsbury inherited his father Robert Sainsbury's entire 18% shareholding, Sainsbury had to split his father Alan Sainsbury's 18% stake with his younger brothers the Hon. Simon Sainsbury and the Rt Hon. Sir Timothy Sainsbury, and so they held 6% each.

During his 23 years as chairman, Sainsbury's replaced all its 82 counter service stores with modern supermarkets, and the number of UK grocery stores increased from 244 stores (including 162 self-service shops) to 313 supermarkets, while the average size of new supermarkets increased from 8,120 sq ft (754 m^{2}) to 34,980 sq ft (3,250 m^{2}). The range of products increased from 4,000 (including 1,500 own brand products) to 16,000 (including 8,000 own brand products). He was said personally to taste own brand products himself to make sure he was satisfied with its quality control, and personally approved every own brand product packaging design himself before the official launch of each new own brand product. He was said to turn up unannounced at stores by helicopter to patrol the aisles and highlight deficiencies.

He led Sainsbury's into the United States through the purchase of Shaw's, a US supermarket chain, and started both the Homebase and Savacentre ventures. Shaw's and Homebase have since been sold, while Savacentre has been re-branded under the core Sainsbury's brand.

Between 1973 and 1992, the company's market capitalisation increased from £117m to £8.115bn owing to an increase in the share price from 9p to 464p (on 15 May 1992). Between 1969 and 1992, sales increased from £166m to £9.202bn and profit before tax increased from £4.3m to £628m. The company also boasted the highest sales per square foot in the food retailing industry and the market share of the UK supermarket business increased from 2.5% to 10.4%. Sainsbury's also overtook both Tesco and Marks & Spencer (the latter shortly before his retirement on his 65th birthday on 2 November 1992) to become the UK's largest and most successful supermarket chain. Following his retirement, his cousin and Labour supporter David Sainsbury (now Lord Sainsbury of Turville) became chairman. Tesco overtook Sainsbury's to become the UK's largest supermarket chain in 1995, and David Sainsbury stepped down as chairman in 1998 to pursue his long-held ambition to have a career in politics.

Although Sainsbury retired, he was life president of the retailer and continued to take an active interest in the business. He toured stores with then chief executive Mike Coupe as well as being the family member always attending J Sainsbury plc annual general meetings. He also served as a joint president of the Sainsbury's Veteran Association alongside former Sainsbury's CEO Dino Adriano.

Sainsbury was also the family member with a large shareholding that was most reluctant to sell down his stake. During the sell down of the family stake between 2005 and 2008 from 35% to 15%, it was Sainsbury who was the last major family shareholder to reduce his stake, in his case from 4% to 3.89%, the 0.11% sold having belonged to a non-beneficial trust held by him.

J Sainsbury plc was informed on 5 December 2006 by Sainsbury that he no longer held a reportable interest in the company following the transfer of shares within his family.

During the takeover bids for Sainsbury's during 2007, Sainsbury used N M Rothschild & Sons as his financial adviser and was said to be the major family shareholder most resistant to selling his stake. Indeed, during the private equity takeover bid during the first half of 2007, he was said to be refusing to sell his stake of just under 3% at any price.

As of August 2009, Sainsbury continued to control just under 3% of the company. Although David Sainsbury controlled the largest family shareholding of 5.85%, and Sainsbury controlled just under 3%, the beneficial holding of David Sainsbury was only 0.57%, compared with 1.6% for JD Sainsbury. The Sainsbury family as a whole controls approximately 15% of Sainsbury's. In the Sunday Times Rich List 2013, his family fortune was estimated at £1.97 billion.

He was a member of the Steering Committee of the Bilderberg Group.

== Charitable works ==
In 1985, he and his two brothers provided funds to construct a new wing of the National Gallery, London, at a cost of around £50 million, which opened in 1991 as the Sainsbury Wing. In 2024, during renovation of the wing, a letter written by Sainsbury was discovered inside of one of two false columns there. In the letter, he expressed his delight at the demolition of the false columns, which he had disliked. As he had placed the letter within the column while the wing was being constructed, he knew that it would only be discovered upon the event of the column's demolition.

With his wife, he also ran the Linbury Trust, which offers grants to various projects in the fields of the Arts, Education, Environment & Heritage, Medical, Social Welfare and Developing Countries. One of the most notable projects funded by the Linbury Trust was the 1990s redevelopment of the Royal Opera House in London. The Linbury Studio Theatre in the building was named in recognition of the substantial contribution made by the trust.

In 1987, Lady Sainsbury of Preston Candover founded the biennial Linbury Prize for Stage Design, which identifies and encourages talented newcomers to the field of theatre design; the prize continues to be funded solely by the Linbury Trust.

In 1993, he joined Lord Rothschild to set up the Butrint Foundation to record and conserve the archaeological site of Butrint in Albania.

In September 2010, he donated £25m to the British Museum, which the BBC reported as the biggest gift to the arts in two decades.

== Personal life and death ==
Sainsbury was married to the former ballerina Anya Linden, daughter of the physicist George C. Eltenton. They had three children.

He was knighted in 1980 for services to the food retailing industry, and was made a life peer on 31 January 1989 with the title Baron Sainsbury of Preston Candover, of Preston Candover in the County of Hampshire. He became a Knight Companion of the Garter in 1992.

Sainsbury died from complications of dementia at his home in Preston Candover, Hampshire, on 14 January 2022, at the age of 94.

== Arms ==
Coat of arms of John Sainsbury, Baron Sainsbury of Preston Candover
Notes Knight since 1980 Coronet A Coronet of a Baron Crest Out of a British mural crown Azure a leopard sejant Or seme of Torteau holding a column Or. Torse Mantling Or and Gules. Escutcheon Azure on a fess dancetty between three cornucopias Or three lyres Gules. Supporters Two leopards proper, standing with the interior foot resting on a Cornucopia Or. Compartment Vert Motto AD EXCELLENTIAM CONTENDERE; Latin: To maintain excellence Orders The Order of the Garter. Banner The banner of the Baron Sainsbury of Preston Candover's arms used as Knight Companion of the Garter depicted at St George's Chapel. Symbolism The cornucopia symbolises the family's grocery business. The "fess dancetty" (horizontal stripe with zig-zag edges) represents Lord Sainsbury of Preston Candover's links with ballet. The lyres symbolise his patronage of music. His interest in wines is represented by the leopards which were chosen because Bacchus, god of wine, is sometimes represented in a chariot drawn by leopards. The Corinthian column in the crest refers to the arts and architecture, towards which he has made contributions.

== Sources ==
- John Davan Sainsbury biography on The Sainsbury Archive website
- Sainsbury's Annual Report 1992
