= George C. Eltenton =

British physicist (1905–1991)

George C. Eltenton FInstP
- Born: George Charles Eltenton; 14 April 1905; Manchester, England
- Died: 26 April 1991 (aged 86); Heswall, Merseyside, England
- Education: University of Cambridge
- Spouse: Ada Dorothea Hamilton
- Children: 3, including Anya Linden
- Scientific career
- Fields: Chemical physics
- Workplaces: British Cotton Research Institute; Institute of Problems of Chemical Physics; Shell Petroleum; Stanlow Oil Refinery

George Charles Eltenton FInstP (14 April 1905 – 26 April 1991) was an English physicist, specialising in chemical physics and a pioneer of mass spectrometry. He was a Fellow of the Physical Society. He and his wife were suspected of being agents of the USSR looking for US atom bomb secrets. He was named by Robert Oppenheimer when interviewed by the Atomic Energy Commission which resulted in Oppenheimer being stripped of his security clearance, in the so-called Chevalier Incident.

== Personal life ==
Eltenton was born in Manchester on 14 April 1905. He attended Bedales School and studied physics at Trinity College, Cambridge, graduating with a first-class in Part I of the natural sciences tripos and a second in Part II. He married Ada Dorothea Hamilton (1904–2001) (known as Dorothea or Dolly) and they had three children: a son, Michael, and two daughters, Ann and Jane. Ann became a ballerina under the stage name Anya Linden, later becoming Baroness Sainsbury on marrying John Sainsbury, Baron Sainsbury of Preston Candover. Jane was born in Russia. Eltenton died on 26 April 1991 in Heswall, Merseyside.

== Professional life ==
Following university, Eltenton began work in 1930 at the British Cotton Research Institute. In the summer of 1931 however, Eltenton visited a friend he had known at Cambridge, Yulii Khariton, at the Institute of Problems of Chemical Physics in Leningrad. He was offered a post in there, and moved to the USSR to work from 1933 until 1938, only leaving because, with the Soviet Great Purge, there was suspicion of foreigners. Like many others, his visa was not renewed, so he returned to England.

The same year he published a paper in the prestigious journal Nature, showing the first identification of free radicals by mass spectrometer, and was invited to the research laboratories of Shell Development Corporation, California to build one of the first mass spectrometers in the US. Here he produced significant work on free radical mass spectrometry.

In 1947 he returned to England, joining the research laboratory of Shell plc at Ellesmere Port, later transferring to the physics laboratory of Stanlow Refinery and producing a number of patents.

== Political activity ==
=== USSR 1933–1938 ===
Dorothea Eltenton wrote a book describing the family's life in the USSR. This was a happy time, despite primitive conditions compared with England, and she writes admiringly of the socialist society they experienced as it developed, with its community spirit, sexual equality and people's local democratic participation in decisions relating to work and public services. In particular they appreciated the free education and free health service. Her experience of maternity and post-natal care was favourably compared with that in the UK (a decade before the introduction of the National Health Service).

On vacations George Eltenton was able to enjoy his passions for motorcycling and rock climbing.

=== US 1938–1947 ===
Eltenton was an open admirer of the USSR and its people. Both he and his wife gave lectures at the California Labor School on Russian life, and were active in the American Russian Institute. He was also a trade union activist for the Federation of Architects, Engineers, Chemists and Technicians at Shell, and was at a meeting where Robert Oppenheimer encouraged the formation of a section at the Lawrence Berkeley National Laboratory.

In 1939, with the beginning of the Second World War he contacted the British Embassy to volunteer, but was told his work for the oil company was better use of his talents. In 1941 the USSR was invaded by Germany, and he and his wife became active members of the Russian War Relief organization.

In May 1942, after the US had also joined the war and was therefore an ally of the USSR, the Eltentons had Piotr Ivanov, the vice consul of the Soviet consulate in San Francisco as a dinner guest. It was there that Ivanov raised the possibility of atomic research being shared between the US and the USSR, and suggested three scientists who might be prepared to do so, if discretion could be assured. Eltenton was doubtful, but agreed to ask a mutual friend Haakon Chevalier to suggest this to Oppenheimer. Chevalier reported back that Oppenheimer was not interested, but when the fact of the approach was revealed by Oppenheimer in 1946, Eltenton was interviewed by the FBI.

=== UK 1947–1991 ===
Shortly after being named in testimony before the House Un-American Activities Committee, the Eltentons returned to England. He first took a senior position at the Shell physics research laboratory, but after investigation by MI5 was moved to an area solely concerned with refinery operations.

== Publications ==
- Eltenton, G. C. (1938). "Direct Evidence for the N2H+ Ion in the Discharge Reaction between N2 and H2". Nature. 141 (3578): 975–976. Bibcode:1938Natur.141..975E. doi:10.1038/141975b0. S2CID 4041283.
- Eltenton, G. C. (1942). "The Detection of Free Radicals by Means of a Mass Spectrometer". Journal of Chemical Physics. 10 (6): 403. Bibcode:1942JChPh..10..403E. doi:10.1063/1.1723738.
- Eltenton, G. C. (1947). "The Study of Reaction Intermediates by Means of a Mass Spectrometer Part I. Apparatus and Method". Journal of Chemical Physics. 15 (7): 455–481. Bibcode:1947JChPh..15..455E. doi:10.1063/1.1746565.
- Eltenton, G. C. (1954). "Some instruments for quality control in petroleum refineries". Journal of Applied Chemistry. 4 (5): 245–256. doi:10.1002/jctb.5010040503.

== Patents ==
- Magnetic method of pipe-line inspection, (1950).
- Photoelectric colorimeter, (1950).
- Refractive index measurement of fluids, (1951).
- Process for the purification of spent sulphuric acid, (1952).
- Infrared gas analyzer, (1954).
- Improvements in and relating to the preparation of oil solutions of highly basic polyvalent metal salts of organic acids, (1956).
- Process for removing coal and carbonaceous material from used sulfuric acid, (1957).
- Improvements in or relating to apparatus for measuring vapour pressure, (1957).
- Improvements in and relating to the preparation of basic polyvalent metal salts of organic acids, (1958).
- Sulphonation of organic liquids, (1960).
- A method of and apparatus for separating liquid phases, (1965).
- Rotary separation of viscous pseudo-plastics, (1965).
