= John Sainsbury (cricketer) =

English cricketer

John Popham Sainsbury (8 January 1927 – September 2004) played first-class cricket for Somerset in two matches in the 1951 season. He was born at Weston-super-Mare, Somerset. The exact date of his death and where it happened are not known.

Educated at Clifton College, Sainsbury was a right-handed middle-order batsman. He played in two first-class matches at Weston-super Mare in a week and failed to score in any of his first three innings, then making 16 in his final outing in the match against Sussex. He also played county rugby union for Somerset.
