= Avert =

British charitable organization

- Founded: 1986
- Founder: Peter Kanabus and Annabel Kanabus, daughter of Robert Sainsbury
- Type: Charitable organisation
- Purpose: HIV, HIV/AIDS, Sexual and reproductive health
- Location: Brighton, UK
- Region served: Worldwide
- CEO: Sarah Hand
- Website: https://avert.info/
- Formerly called: AIDS Virus Education Research Trust

Avert is an international charity that uses digital communications to increase health literacy on HIV and sexual health, among those most affected in areas of greatest need, in order to reduce new infections and improve health and well-being. Between 1986 and 2024 Avert supported inclusive, non-judgemental information services, sponsored medical research that others refused to fund, and supported local organisations in the UK, Asia and Africa with funds to support key HIV prevention, care and treatment services.

During its last ten years, Avert focused primarily on digital communications to build health literacy on HIV and sexual health, thereby supporting global efforts to end AIDS and achieve the Sustainable Development Goal for Health.

In this period, Avert worked in partnership with organisations in countries most affected by HIV to develop and promote digital HIV and sexual health content and resources that are accurate, accessible, useful, and actionable.

In November 2023, work began to transition Avert's core brands to African-led and African-based organisations who could maintain and grow Avert's legacy into the future.

Avert was based in Brighton, UK, with staff members also based in Zimbabwe and South Africa.

== Transition strategy ==
In November 2023 Avert embarked on a new strategy to sustain the value and impact of the organisation's work into the future, by handing over Boost and Be in the KNOW brands to locally run organisations in East and Southern Africa. This strategy also aligned to the growing localisation agenda in the international development sector.

Avert completed the handover of its core brands to new owners in Kenya and Zimbabwe in early 2025.

The sexual health brand Be in the KNOW was handed over to Well Made Strategy's Kenya Comms Hub in Kenya (KCH).

The digital job aid for community health workers, Boost, was handed over to two organisations – OPHID in Zimbabwe and LVCT Health in Kenya.

OPHID in Zimbabwe took ownership of Boost in Zimbabwe and Southern Africa. LVCT Health in Kenya was also given ownership of the Boost product and rebranded under the name Himarika with content translated into Swahili.

The three organisations have also created a community of practice to collaborate, share and learn going forward.

== Key work ==
Project	Platforms	Description
Be in the KNOW	Website, Facebook, Instagram	Be in the KNOW is a digital brand that offers fresh, sex-positive content primarily for individuals in East and Southern Africa, and for the community health workers and primary practitioners that support them.
Boost	App, web app, Chatbot, Facebook and WhatsApp	Boost is a digital, mobile-first set of communication tools that aim to increase the knowledge, skills and confidence of community health workers in Southern Africa, so they can provide high quality care and support to their communities.
Youth Boost	App	Building on Avert's existing Boost platform, Youth Boost aims to increase the number of young people (aged 10-24) accessing HIV, sexual health, family planning, Female Genital Schistosomiasis (FGS) and mental health services in four provinces in Zimbabwe.
Be in the Know Zambia	App	Be in the Know Zambia is a story-driven mobile app co-created with young people in Zambia, to increase condom-related knowledge, communication about sexual health, and support healthier choices.
Young Voices	Videos and comic creator	Young Voices Africa is an interactive package of animations and information materials on sex and relationships – created by, and for, young people between 15 and 24 years old in Southern Africa.
Eagle	App	Eagle engages out-of-school, low literacy girls in Mozambique through a digital life skills and sexual health app called Yaya (Sister). It is part of VSO's Eagle project in Mozambique – Empowering Adolescent Girls to Learn and Earn.
Social media	Facebook, Instagram, Twitter, LinkedIn	Avert uses social media to share accurate, trusted and positive information on HIV and sexual health, encouraging conversations, and providing a space to share experiences.
Avert.org	Website	For over 27 years, the Avert.org website provided clear and trusted information about HIV and AIDS. The site changed many times as technology developed. In 2015, the Avert.org website had a major redesign, with a focus on mobile users. The website was divided into two main areas – public and professional. The public section of the site provided information for individual on sexual health, HIV and STIs, and relationships – including personal stories from the site's users. It offered reassurance to people newly diagnosed with HIV and dispelled dangerous myths about HIV and AIDS. The professional section of the site provided a thoroughly researched and referenced resource on the global epidemic, alongside an up-to-date news service to inform people working in HIV programming, policy or research, health workers, teachers and students. In line with the changing needs of the HIV epidemic, the Avert.org website was decommissioned in March 2022 with the learning and evidence it generated used to develop a new youth-focused sexual health brand, Be in the KNOW. During its lifetime, Avert.org reached over 215 million people.

== Endorsements and accreditations ==
Avert endorses the Principles for Digital Development and is a Gold standard endorser. Avert is also a signatory of the UK Patient Information Forum's Health and Digital Literacy Charter. It also endorses the Pleasure Project's 'Pleasure Principles', committing to a sex-positive approach to sexual health and rights.

In 2021, Avert was accredited by the Patient Information Forum (PIF). Avert has the 'PIF TICK' quality mark, ensuring the health information it produces is of the highest quality, clear and accurate.

In January 2015, Avert became a certified member of the Information Standard, a UK National Health Service (NHS) accreditation that recognises trustworthy health information.

== Awards ==
In 2012, Avert.org won the Nominet Internet Award under the 'Online Training and Education' category, in association with the British Library.

In 2005 the Avert.org website won the British Medical Association's Patient Information Award for Websites.

== History and early work ==
Avert was founded in 1986, by Peter Kanabus and his wife Annabel, daughter of former Sainsbury's chairman Robert Sainsbury. In its first fifteen years the charity focused on producing educational publications and funding HIV-related educational, social and medical research.

A number of Avert's publications, such as the AIDS: Working With Young People (1993) teaching pack were based on substantial educational research. In addition many thousands of AVERT's booklets were distributed in the UK each year, covering such topics as sex education, sexuality and HIV.

Medical research funded by Avert included the first ever study of the effect of pregnancy on the progression of HIV disease, and social research included studies of HIV and drug use in UK prisons.

The Avert.org website was launched in 1995 in order to provide education about prevention of HIV and support for individuals living with HIV and AIDS. In 2022 the website was replaced by Beintheknow.org offering a more tailored resource, primarily for individuals in East and Southern Africa, and for the community health workers and primary practitioners that support them.

In 2001 the charity decided to concentrate on two key areas of work: its information and education website Avert.org website, and its programme work outside of the UK in countries with a particularly high or rapidly increasing rate of HIV infection.

The charity's work made headlines in 2008 when South African doctor Colin Pfaff was suspended from his post for supplying HIV positive, pregnant women with the antiretroviral drug AZT, which had been paid for by Avert. At the time the South African government had not approved the use of AZT to prevent mother-to-child transmission of HIV, even though it was recommended by the World Health Organization and was widely used in other developing countries. Rural doctors, scientists, AIDS activists and organisations rallied in support of Pfaff, and the charges were subsequently dropped.

In 2014, outputs of research funded by Avert (the Care in the Home Study) exploring challenges facing caregivers in rural South Africa was published in the PLOS ONE journal.

Until 2020, Avert funded a range of projects in developing countries. Avert worked with a variety of organisations, including Sangram in southwest India, Tholulwazi Uzivikele in KwaZulu Natal. The Umunthu Foundation in Malawi, Sisonke in South Africa, Phelisanang Bophelong in Lesotho, and Bwafwano Integrated Services Organisation (BISO) in Zambia.
