= Anya Linden =

British ballet dancer

The Right Honourable The Lady Sainsbury of Preston Candover CBE
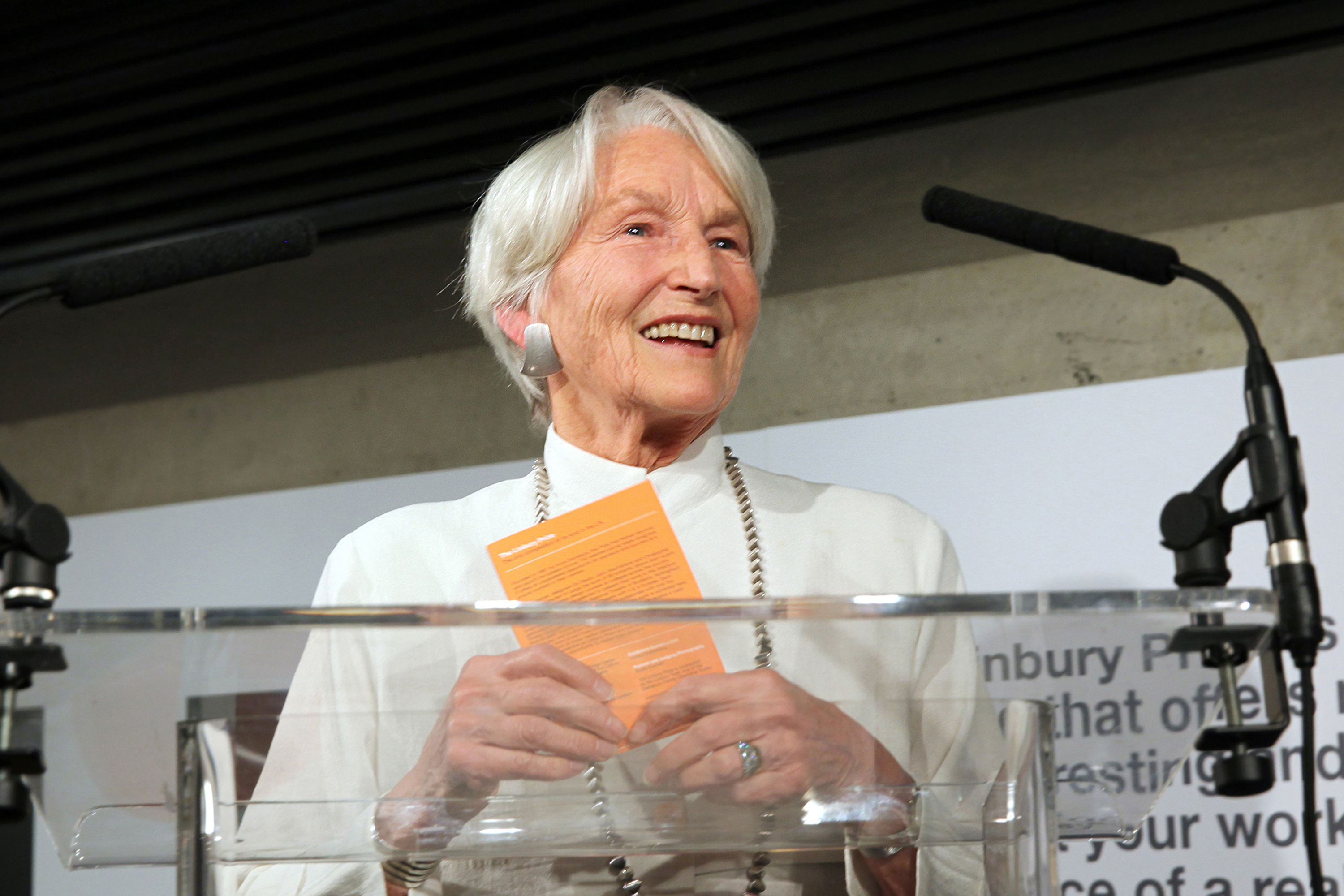
- Linden in 2013
- Born: Ann Eltenton; 3 January 1933 (age 93); Manchester, England
- Occupation: Ballet dancer
- Spouses: Igor Tamarin; John Sainsbury, Baron Sainsbury of Preston Candover (m. 1963; died 2022)
- Children: 3
- Parent(s): George C. Eltenton, Ada Dorothea Eltenton

Anya Linden, Baroness Sainsbury of Preston Candover CBE (née Ann Eltenton; 3 January 1933) is an English retired ballerina and patron of the arts.

== Early life and family ==
Linden was born Ann Eltenton in Manchester, the daughter of physicist George C. Eltenton and his wife, Dorothea. She moved with her family to Leningrad when she was six months old, where she was known by the Russian equivalent name Anya.

In 1938, the family moved to Berkeley, California, where her father worked for Shell Development Emeryville. Her parents, however, were suspected of being Soviet agents seeking atomic secrets. They gave public lectures on Soviet life and were active in the Soviet-American organisations. In 1942, her father was involved in the Chevalier Incident.

== Ballet career ==
Linden began ballet at 7 years old with Dorothy Pring of the Berkeley Opera Theater Ballet on Forest Avenue. Her teacher recalled her as a hard worker, stating that even at a young age, "her whole soul was immersed in dancing even then. She loved classical ballet and never liked to diverge from it. Never pushy, she didn't care where she stood in the line, just so long as she danced. When she was 12, she spent six weeks training in Hollywood with Russian teacher Theodore Kosloff, who had been Pring's teacher. He suggested she changed her name to Anya Linden.

She returned to England in 1947 and studied at the Sadler's Wells Ballet School, joining the company in 1951. She was promoted to soloist in 1954 and to prima ballerina in 1958.

She retired from dancing in 1965, subsequently becoming a director of the Ballet Rambert, Royal Ballet School and the Young Vic.

In 1987, she founded the biennial Linbury Prize for Stage Design to identify and encourage talented newcomers to the field of theatre design. Along with her husband, she founded the Linbury Trust, named from a combination of the names Linden and Sainsbury.

== Personal life ==
In 1958, Linden married Russian-American violinist Igor Tamarin in London. They lived together until 1960. She divorced him in 1962 on grounds of adultery.

She married John Sainsbury, Baron Sainsbury of Preston Candover in 1963.

The retailer Sainsbury's, formerly led by her husband, developed a potato variety in 1996 that was named 'Anya' in her honour. She was appointed a Commander of the Order of the British Empire (CBE) in the 2003 New Year Honours for services to Arts Education and Ballet.
