= Cairistìona =

- Gender: Feminine

Origin
- Origin: Scottish Gaelic
- Meaning: "a Christian"
- Region of origin: Scotland

Other names
- Related names: Christina, Kristina, Kristine, Christine, Christian, Chris

Cairistìona is a Scottish Gaelic female given name meaning Christian. The English equivalent is Christina. The name originates in the Scottish Highlands. There is a traditional song about Cairistiona, which is about a lost love. The name is rare, but usually used by Gaelic-speaking families. The equivalent in Irish is Crístíona.

== People ==
=== Cairistìona ===
- Cairistìona Nic Ruaidhrí, Scottish Noblewoman

== See also ==
- List of Scottish Gaelic given names
