= Sunday Times Rich List 2008 =

The Sunday Times Rich List 2008 was published on 27 April 2008.

Since 1989, the UK national Sunday newspaper The Sunday Times (sister paper to The Times) has published an annual magazine supplement to the newspaper called the Sunday Times Rich List. The list is based on an estimate of the minimum wealth of the richest 1,000 people or families in the United Kingdom as of January of that year, and is compiled by Dr Philip Beresford.

A separate section lists the 250 richest Irish, including both Northern Ireland and the Republic of Ireland.

The list was previewed on ITV1 on 24 April 2008 in Britain's Rich List: Giving It Away, presented by millionaire Duncan Bannatyne.

As in previous years, the List was widely covered in other UK media on the day of its publication; The Daily Telegraph, for example, noted that "Kirsty Bertarelli, a former Miss United Kingdom from Staffordshire, is the highest placed woman, appearing at number six on the list alongside her husband, the biotechnology tycoon Ernesto Bertarelli."

The top four places in the List were unchanged from the previous year. Only six of the top 20 were born in Britain.

Among the most notable changes were three new names on the List entering in the top 12: Alisher Usmanov, Leonard Blavatnik, both Russian entrepreneurs with homes in London, and Ernesto Bertarelli.

== Top 12 fortunes ==
2008		Name	Citizenship	Source of wealth	2007	
Rank	Net worth £ bn	Name	Citizenship	Source of wealth	Rank	Net worth £ bn
1	£27.70 ▲	Lakshmi Mittal	India	Steel	1	£19.25
2	£11.70 ▲	Roman Abramovich	Russia	Oil, industry	2	£10.80
3	£7.00	The Duke of Westminster	United Kingdom	Property	3	£7.00
4	£6.20	Srichand and Gopichand Hinduja		Industry and finance	4	£6.20
5 ▲	£5.73 ▲	Alisher Usmanov		Steel and mining	n/a	not listed
6 ▲	£5.65 ▲	Ernesto and Kirsty Bertarelli		Pharmaceuticals	n/a	not listed
7 ▼	£5.40	Hans Rausing		Food packaging	6	£5.40
8	£4.65 ▲	John Fredriksen		Shipping	8	£3.50
9 ▼	£4.33 ▼	Sir Philip Green	United Kingdom	Retailing	7	£4.90
10 ▼	£4.30 ▲	David and Simon Reuben		Property	8	£3.49
11 ▲	£3.97 ▲	Leonard Blavatnik		Industry	n/a	not listed
12	£3.73 ▲	Seán Quinn		Quarrying, property, insurance	12	£3.05

== See also ==
- Lists of billionaires
