= Robert Sainsbury =

Son of John Benjamin Sainsbury (1906–2000)

Sir Robert Sainsbury
- Born: Robert James Sainsbury; 24 October 1906
- Died: 2 April 2000 (aged 93)
- Education: Haileybury College
- Alma mater: Pembroke College, Cambridge
- Spouse: Lisa van den Bergh (m. 1937)
- Children: 4, including David
- Relatives: Sainsbury family

Sir Robert James Sainsbury (24 October 1906 – 2 April 2000) was a businessman, philanthropist, and patron of the arts. He was the son of John Benjamin Sainsbury and the grandson of the founder of Sainsbury's supermarkets John James Sainsbury. He read history at Pembroke College, Cambridge, then studied accountancy, later becoming a fellow of the Institute of Chartered Accountants. He and his elder brother Alan John Sainsbury became joint general managers of J. Sainsbury Ltd. in 1938. In 1967, he took over as chairman of the company and in the same year, he was knighted for his services to the arts.

== Early life and career ==
Sainsbury was born in Hampstead in 1906, and was the second son of John Benjamin Sainsbury and Mabel Miriam van den Burgh, the daughter of Jacob Van den Bergh, whose family were Dutch Jewish industrialists and manufactured margarine. Her grandfather was Simon van den Bergh. Robert's older brother Alan John Sainsbury was Baron Sainsbury and the first in the family to receive a life peerage.

Sainsbury was educated at Haileybury College (1919–1924) and read history at Pembroke College, Cambridge (1924–1927). He later studied accountancy and became a fellow of the Institute of Chartered Accountants. He enjoyed university, where he gained an upper second, but disliked being at boarding school.

His grandfather John James Sainsbury was the son of a picture-frame maker and his grandmother Mary Ann Sainsbury née Staples was the daughter of a St. Pancras wood carver who became a dairyman. They married in 1869 and opened a shop selling butter, eggs and milk at 173 Drury Lane. Robert's father John Benjamin, their oldest son, expanded the grocery into a chain of 250 store throughout the south of England, East Anglia and the Midlands. After a heart attack in 1938, John Benjamin handed over the day to day running of the store to Robert and Alan. Their father remained chairman, and the two brothers became co-managers of J Sainsbury Ltd . Robert became deputy chairman when his father died in 1956, and succeeded his brother as chairman in 1967. When Robert retired in 1969, Alan's son John became chairman and Robert was then appointed Joint Life President of the retailer along with his brother.

== Personal life ==
In 1937, Sainsbury married his second cousin Lisa Ingeborg Van den Bergh in a secret wedding ceremony. den Bergh was the daughter of Professor Simon van den Bergh and Sonia Pokrojski. They had four children:

- Elizabeth (19 July 1938 – 14 August 1977)
- David Sainsbury, Baron Sainsbury of Turville (born 24 October 1940)
- Celia (born 1945)
- Annabel (born 1948), married Peter Kanabus, with two children

== Politics ==
Robert James Sainsbury was a strong supporter of the Beveridge Report, which cradled the welfare state into being. By the end of the war, Robert Sainsbury had cut the long hours in which staff was under with men conscripted and women on war work.

== Philanthropy and service to the arts ==
Sainsbury was as an art collector and benefactor who gave his collection to the University of East Anglia. He was granted a knighthood in 1967 for his services to the arts. He was made an Honorary Fellow at Pembroke College in 1983.

In 1973, Sainsbury made a gift to the University of East Anglia and hundreds of paintings along with drawings and sculptures from around the world. He donated the bulk of his art collection to the £2.5 million Sainsbury Centre for Visual Arts at the University of East Anglia that he and his wife Lisa founded in 1978. The couple commissioned the then little-known architect Norman Foster to design an art gallery. After the initial gift they continued to acquire artworks for the university and to make endowments for running costs and for new departments specializing in non-Western arts.

He was an early supporter of artists Henry Moore, Francis Bacon, Pablo Picasso, Amedeo Modigliani and Charles Despiau, and later Giacometti. His own interest in art began when he was a student at Cambridge and started collecting private-press fine arts books and on weekends he would go into London and buy Jacob Epstein drawings. In 1933, he bought Henry Moore's major stone sculpture Mother and Child of 1932 for £158, who was at the time the little-known art teacher and with whom he would become a lifelong friend. In the same year, Sainsbury started his own printing venture, the Gemini Press, with the engraver Blair Hughes-Stanton.

Sainsbury served as a trustee of the Tate Gallery from 1959 to 1973, becoming vice-chairman in 1967 and chairman in 1969. He was also an early patron of the National Art Collections Fund. He served as honorary treasurer of the Institute of Medical Social Workers (1948–1971) and as a governor of St Thomas's Hospital (1939–1968), and made major donations to hospitals including gifting The Sainsbury Ward to Northwick Park Hospital in 1995.
