= Mary Ann Sainsbury =

British businesswoman (1849–1927)

- Born: Mary Ann Staples; 30 June 1849
- Died: 9 June 1927 (aged 77)
- Known for: Businesswoman
- Spouse: John James Sainsbury

Mary Ann Sainsbury (née Staples; 30 June 1849 – 9 June 1927) was the wife of John James Sainsbury, the founder of the Sainsbury's supermarket chain. The supermarket chain named their official brand typeface 'Mary-Ann', used in-store, online and in advertising after her.

== Early and private life ==
Staples was born on 30 June 1849 at 4 Little Charles Street (now St Joans House, Phoenix St.), Somers Town, London. Her father, Benjamin Staples, was originally a woodcarver, but in 1863 he opened a small dairy shop at 87 Chalton Street, Somers Town. Mary Ann and her two younger brothers probably helped out in this shop.

On 20 April 1869, during her marriage to John James Sainsbury, Mary Ann Staples was working in the dairy shop of a family friend, Tom Haile, at 32 Strutton Ground, Victoria.

In 1873, the family moved to live above their second shop at 159 Queen's Crescent, Kentish Town. The area in which this branch was located was newly developed and much less overcrowded than Drury Lane. Mary Ann continued to work in the shop, but her role diminished as the size of her family grew.

By the 1880s, the firm's success had made the Sainsbury family extremely prosperous. When the family moved again, in 1886, it was to a smart villa in the fashionable suburb of Highgate. Mary Ann was now devoting herself entirely to family life and none of her five daughters needed to enter the business.

== Business career ==
In 1869, John James and Mary Ann Sainsbury opened a dairy shop at 173 Drury Lane, Holborn, which became the first branch of the British supermarket chain Sainsbury's. It is said that Mary Ann ran the shop at 173 Drury Lane by herself for the first few weeks it was open. This was probably so that she and her husband could rely on his wages while they built up their own trade.

Meanwhile, her father, Benjamin Staples, continued to expand his chain of grocery stores. The Staples chain later grew to around six branches, many of which were later sold to Sainsbury's. A former Staples branch, at 68 Watney Street, Stepney, was sold to Sainsbury's in 1881 when John James Sainsbury purchased it from his brother in-law (Mary Ann's brother) Edward Staples. This store was the first Sainsbury's store to trial round-the-back deliveries, which was started so as to not upset an Irish competitor, Mike Drummond. The original Somers Town store was sold to Sainsbury's in 1882.

Mary Ann continued to take an interest in the business, however and accompanied John James on inspections of the shops almost until her death, on 9 June 1927, at Bishopsfield, Broadlands Road, Highgate, Middlesex.
