= John James Sainsbury =

British grocer and businessman (1844–1928)

James Sainsbury
- Born: 12 June 1844; Lambeth, London, England
- Died: 3 January 1928 (aged 83); London, England
- Occupation: Grocer
- Spouse: Mary Ann Staples (m. 1868)
- Relatives: Sainsbury family

John James Sainsbury (12 June 1844 – 3 January 1928) was an English grocer and founder of what is now called the Sainsbury's supermarket chain.

== Early and private life ==
John James Sainsbury was born on 12 June 1844 at 5 Oakley Street, Lambeth, (now Baylis Road) to John Sainsbury (baptised 1809, d. 1863), ornament and picture frame maker, and his wife Elizabeth Sarah, née Coombes (1817–1902).

During his childhood, his family moved frequently, often between rented rooms. The area in which they lived was close to the Thames wharves and to Waterloo station, which opened in 1848.

Sainsbury started work at the age of 14 years old. He may have stayed at school beyond the normal leaving age of 10 or 11, possibly helping out as a "monitor". His first job was with a grocer in the New Cut, Lambeth.

In 1863, Sainsbury's father died and John James took on the additional responsibility of helping to support his mother and two sisters.

At the age of 24, he married Mary Ann Staples and they set up a dairy shop together at 173 Drury Lane, Holborn. The couple had probably saved a few pounds with which to buy shop equipment but their circumstances were extremely modest. They shared the cramped accommodation above the little shop with three other families.

In 1872 John and Mary Ann opened their second shop at 159 Queen's Crescent. The following year the Sainsbury family moved to live above the shop.

== Business career ==
Throughout his life, Sainsbury avoided personal publicity and little evidence remains of his character. His business style was to offer competitive prices while simultaneously demonstrating higher standards of quality, service, and hygiene.

From one store in Holborn, London, opened at 173 Drury Lane in 1869, Sainsbury built a chain of grocery stores which numbered 128 when he died in 1928. Sainsbury's remained a family business during his whole life. At the time of the firm's incorporation in 1922, Sainsbury took on the title of Chairman and Governing Director, a position which he held until his death in 1928.
