= List of Bradley University people =

This list of Bradley University people includes alumni and faculty of Bradley University, a private, mid-sized university in Peoria, Illinois founded in 1897.

== Alumni ==
=== Government, public service, and public policy ===
- David Brant — former director of Naval Criminal Investigative Service
- Richard E. Carver — former Mayor of Peoria and 16th Assistant Secretary of the U.S. Air Force
- Brad Cohen — motivational speaker and teacher
- Tom Fink — former mayor of Anchorage, Alaska and Speaker of Alaska House of Representatives
- Joseph R. Holzapple — U.S. Air Force four-star general
- Laura Kelly — 48th Governor of Kansas
- Robin Kelly — U.S. Congresswoman from Illinois' 2nd District
- Morris Kleiner — AFL-CIO Professor of Public Policy, Humphrey School, University of Minnesota
- Ray LaHood — U.S. Congressman from Illinois' 18th District and former United States Secretary of Transportation
- Ali al-Marri — convicted 9/11 co-conspirator
- Judge Joe Billy McDade — Senior United States District Judge for the Central District of Illinois (BS '59, MS '60)
- Robert H. Michel — U.S. Congressman from Illinois' 18th District and longest serving Republican leader of the U.S. House of Representatives
- Nicholas Scoppetta — New York City Fire Commissioner
- James E. Shadid — former chief United States district judge for Central District of Illinois, now president of Bradley University
- General John M. Shalikashvili — retired chairman of the Joint Chiefs of Staff and former Supreme Allied Commander of NATO
- Jerald D. Slack — U.S. Air National Guard Major General, Adjutant General of Wisconsin
- Ryan Spain — Member of the Illinois House of Representatives from the 74th district
- Scott Randolph — Orange County Tax Collector and former member of the Florida House of Representatives
- Aaron Schock — former member of the US House of Representatives
- Rosemary Thomson — Member of the Iowa House of Representatives.
- Michael D Unes — Member of the Illinois House of Representatives from the 91st district and Assistant Minority Leader
- Chuck Weaver — Member of the Illinois Senate from the 37th District

=== Literature, arts, and media ===
- Cecil Baldwin — voice of Cecil Palmer, the narrator of the podcast Welcome to Night Vale
- Jill Bennett — actress
- Merle Boyer—jewelry designer
- Jack Brickhouse — Baseball Hall of Fame honoree, radio and TV announcer for the Chicago Cubs
- Cardon V. Burnham — musical composer, arranger, conductor, performer
- Hal Corley — five-time Emmy Award-winning TV writer, nationally produced and published playwright
- Philip José Farmer — author, known for science fiction and fantasy novels
- Neil Flynn — actor best known for his roles on Scrubs and The Middle
- Jerry Hadley — lyric tenor for the New York Metropolitan Opera
- Chick Hearn — Basketball Hall of Fame play-by-play announcer for the Los Angeles Lakers
- David Horowitz — consumer advocate
- Tami Lane — Academy Award winner (makeup, The Chronicles of Narnia: The Lion, the Witch and the Wardrobe)
- Ralph Lawler — TV and radio play-by-play announcer for the Los Angeles Clippers
- Jeff Mauro — television personality on Food Network
- Rude Osolnik (1915–2001) American woodturner and educator; class of 1937
- Lyall Smith — sportswriter, editor and Detroit Lions public-relations director
- Charley Steiner — sportscaster, ESPN's SportsCenter, radio announcer for New York Yankees and Los Angeles Dodgers
- Richard Thomas - author, known for his neo-noir and speculative fiction
- Timothy Treadwell — environmentalist and documentarian, star of Animal Planet's Grizzly Man Diaries
- Eric Petersen — actor, best known for role of Kevin in AMC's Kevin Can F**k Himself
- Michelle Young — American television personality best known for being the Runner up on The Bachelor season 25 and being the lead of The Bachelorette season 18

=== Business and science ===
- Dr. Lillian Glass — expert in body language, columnist, TV commentator
- Jerry Hayden — former President of Peacock Engineering
- John R. Horne (MS 1964) — former CEO of Navistar
- Howard Lance — chairman, president, and chief executive officer at Harris Corporation
- Major Robert Henry Lawrence, Jr. — became the first African American astronaut in 1967
- J.J. Liu — software engineer; one of the top women poker players in the world
- Timothy L. Mounts — agricultural chemist specializing in edible oilseed
- George T. Shaheen — former CEO of Siebel Systems, Andersen Consulting, and Webvan
- Louis Skidmore — architect and co-founder of Skidmore, Owings & Merrill

=== Athletics ===
- Alon Badat (born 1989) - Israeli soccer player
- Pat Brady — professional football player for Pittsburgh Steelers
- Gavin Glinton — professional soccer player for Nam Dinh FC and Turks and Caicos Islands national football team
- Curt Hasler — professional baseball player and current bullpen coach for Chicago White Sox
- Hersey Hawkins — professional basketball player for Chicago Bulls, Seattle SuperSonics, Charlotte Hornets and Philadelphia 76ers; also bronze medalist, 1988 Summer Olympics; all-time leading scorer for Bradley men's basketball
- Harry Jacobs — professional football player for Boston Patriots, Buffalo Bills and New Orleans Saints
- Scottie James (born 1996) - basketball player for Hapoel Haifa in the Israeli Basketball Premier League
- Jerry Krause — legendary General Manager for the Chicago Bulls; managed the Bulls to six NBA Championships and two-time recipient of the NBA's Executive of the Year award
- Walt Lemon Jr. (born 1992) - basketball player in the Israel Basketball Premier League
- Jim Les — professional basketball player for Utah Jazz, Los Angeles Clippers, Sacramento Kings and Atlanta Hawks; assistant coach for WNBA's Sacramento Monarchs; former head coach at Bradley
- Bobby Joe Mason — professional basketball player for Harlem Globetrotters
- Shellie McMillon — professional basketball player for Detroit Pistons
- Gene Melchiorre — basketball player, first overall pick in 1951 NBA Draft
- Steve Miller — coach, Kansas State athletic director, Nike and Professional Bowlers Association executive, University of Oregon faculty member
- Dennis Morgan — professional football player for Dallas Cowboys and Philadelphia Eagles
- Bryan Namoff — soccer player, defensive starter for Major League Soccer team D.C. United
- Patrick O'Bryant — professional basketball player drafted ninth overall in the 2006 NBA draft by Golden State Warriors
- Anthony Parker — professional basketball player for Toronto Raptors, Orlando Magic, Philadelphia 76ers, and Cleveland Cavaliers
- Marcus Pollard — professional football player for Detroit Lions, Indianapolis Colts and Seattle Seahawks
- Kirby Puckett — 1981 One of just six professional baseball players for Minnesota Twins inducted into Baseball Hall of Fame
- Ray Ramsey — professional football player for the Chicago Cardinals
- Bryan Rekar — professional baseball player for Colorado Rockies, Tampa Bay Devil Rays, and Kansas City Royals
- Bill Roehnelt — professional football player for Chicago Bears, Washington Redskins and Denver Broncos
- Matt Savoie — figure skater, U.S. bronze medalist, member of 2006 Winter Olympics U.S. team
- Rob Scahill — professional baseball player for Colorado Rockies and Pittsburgh Pirates
- Leo Schrall — baseball head coach from 1949 through 1972, led Bradley Braves to two College World Series appearances and five Missouri Valley Conference championships
- Brian Shouse — professional baseball player for Tampa Bay Rays
- Bill Stone — football player, halfback for Baltimore Colts, Chicago Bears ('51–'54), Bradley football head coach
- Levern Tart — professional basketball player for several ABA teams
- Mike Tauchman (born 1990) - outfielder for the Chicago Cubs of Major League Baseball
- David Thirdkill — professional basketball player, member of 1985–86 Boston Celtics championship team, also played for Detroit Pistons and Phoenix Suns, 1993 Israeli Basketball Premier League MVP
- Bill Tuttle — professional baseball player for Detroit Tigers, Kansas City Athletics, and Minnesota Twins
- John M. Veitch — Hall of Fame thoroughbred racehorse trainer
- Chet Walker — Naismith Memorial Basketball Hall of Fame inductee, professional basketball player for Syracuse Nationals, Philadelphia 76ers, and Chicago Bulls

== Faculty ==
People who did not attend Bradley as a student but were on the Bradley staff or faculty include:

- John R. Brazil — president of Bradley, 1992–2000
- Phil Crane — Member of the U.S. House of Representatives from Illinois's 13th district (1969-1973), 12th district (1973-1993), and 8th district (1993-2005)
- Romeo B. Garrett — He was the first black faculty member to be hired by the university. Professor of Sociology.
- Claire Etaugh — Dean of the College of Liberal Arts and Sciences
- Ernst Ising — German physicist: developed the Ising model in statistical mechanics
- Sibyl Moholy-Nagy - German-American architectural writer, in 1948
- David P. Schmitt — Personality psychologist, founder of the International Sexuality Description Project, (1995–present)
- Kevin Stein — Poet Laureate of Illinois (2003–present)
- Charles E. Tucker, Jr. — retired U.S. Air Force Major General and Executive Director of the World Engagement Institute
- Olive B. White — novelist, English professor, longtime Dean of Women
