= Nicholas de Scossa =

Swiss-based financier. de (born 1957)

Nicholas John Noel de Scossa (born December 1957) is a Swiss-based financier. de Scossa is a former chief executive and chairman of Bristol Rugby Club.

In 2000 de Scossa was involved in debates about top clubs separating from the Rugby Football Union and forming a new Premier League. He was banned from buying international match tickets after forging a letter purporting to be from a Rugby Football Union official.

In 2016 he was involved in negotiations for British Home Stores.
