= Borders (retailer) =

Defunct American bookseller and retailer

- Logo used since 2005

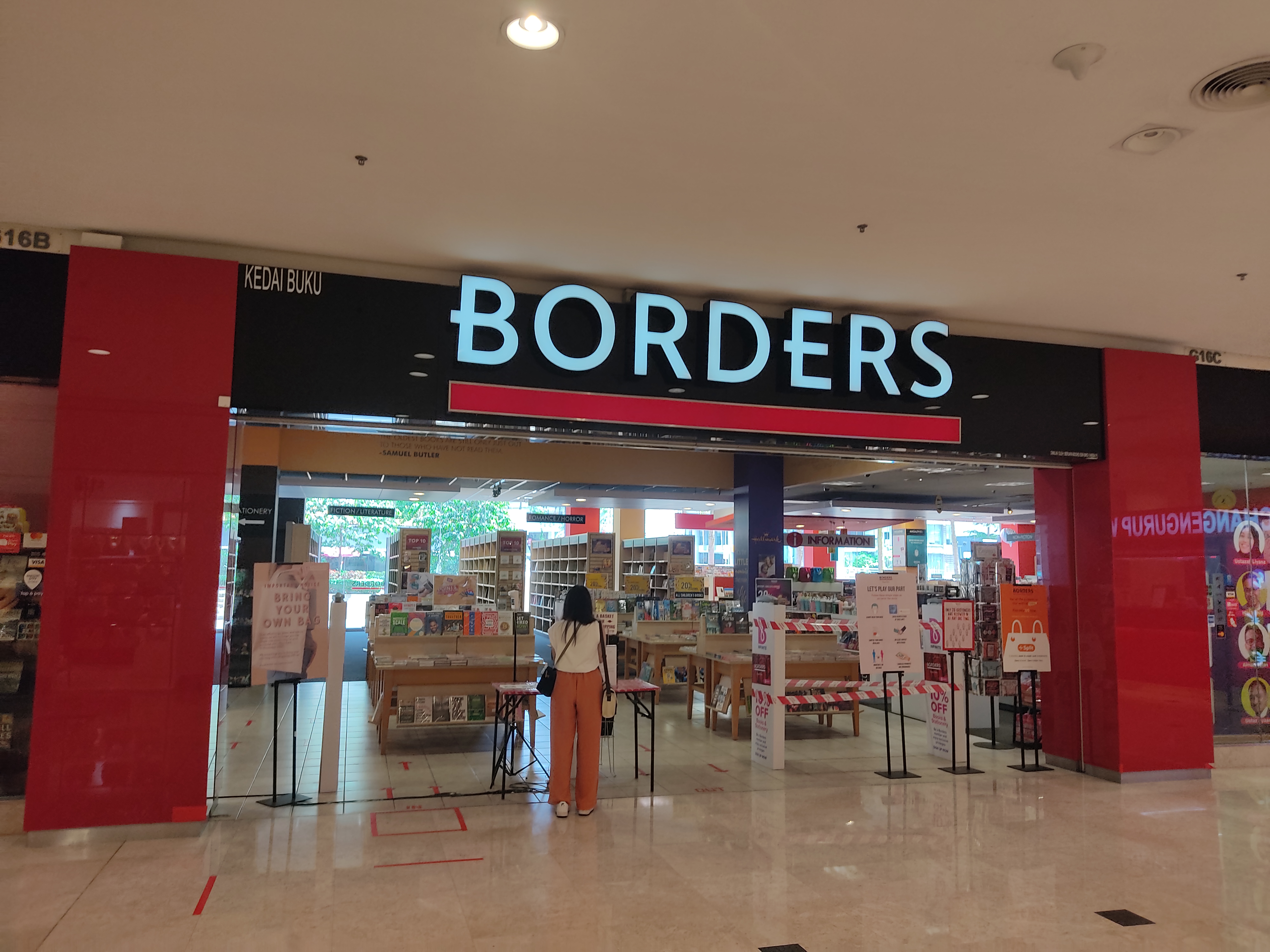
- A former Borders outlet in Malaysia
- Industry: Bookselling
- Founded: 1971; 55 years ago
- Headquarters: United States
- Area served: Kuwait; Oman; Qatar; United Arab Emirates; Australia (defunct); Ireland (defunct); Malaysia (defunct); New Zealand (defunct); Singapore (defunct); United Kingdom (defunct); United States (defunct)
- Products: Books; Stationery; Toys; CDs (formerly); DVDs (formerly); Magazines (formerly)
- Owner: Al Maya Group (Middle East); Barnes & Noble (rest of world, trademarks)
- Subsidiaries: Waldenbooks (former)

Borders was an American book and stationery retailer founded in 1971 in Ann Arbor, Michigan, by brothers Tom and Louis Borders. Today, Borders exists in multiple countries in the Middle East.

In October 1992, it was purchased by Kmart, and was then spun-off in 1995 as Borders Group, Inc. remaining headquartered in Ann Arbor, with Waldenbooks as its subsidiary. In 1997, Borders expanded into Singapore, and later Australia and New Zealand. In 1998, Borders expanded into the United Kingdom, and then later Ireland. In 2005, it opened in Malaysia, and in 2006, with Al Maya Group, it opened a location in the United Arab Emirates, and then further expanded across the Middle East.

In September 2007, Risk Capital Partners purchased the Borders stores in the United Kingdom and Ireland, alongside a license to use the Borders name. In June 2008, REDgroup Retail purchased the Borders stores in Singapore, Australia and New Zealand with a license to the Borders name.

In November 2009, Borders in the United Kingdom and Ireland collapsed into administration, with all stores closed by year end, resulting in around 1,150 job losses. In June 2011, Borders closed in Singapore, Australia and New Zealand after its franchisor went into administration. In July 2011, Borders in the United States was liquidated after failing to find a buyer. It employed about 19,500 people throughout America, including Waldenbooks stores. Its final U.S. stores closed in September 2011.

In September 2011, its rival Barnes & Noble acquired the Borders trademark and other intellectual property. The Malaysian and Middle East Borders operations continued to trade under renewed franchise deals with Barnes & Noble. A 2013 attempt to re-establish the brand in Singapore failed. In 2015, Al Maya Group purchased the regional Borders trademark rights outright from Barnes & Noble, and diversified it into a merchandise mix of books, toys and stationery. The Malaysian Borders franchises closed in August 2023.

== History ==
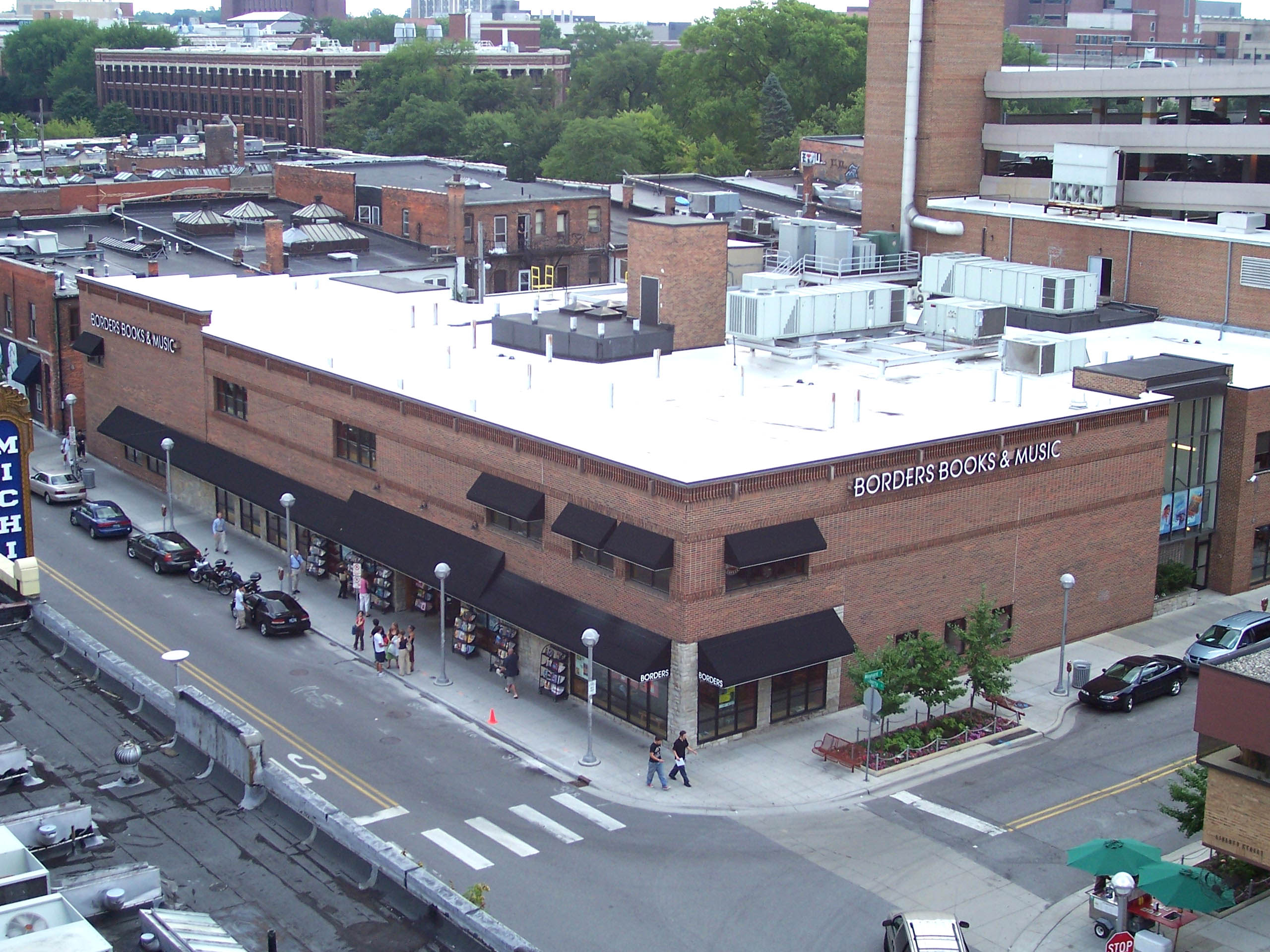
Borders No.1, downtown Ann Arbor, Michigan, 2005

The original Borders bookstore was established in 1971 at 209 South State Street, Ann Arbor, Michigan, United States; founded by brothers Tom and Louis Borders during their study at the University of Michigan.

In 1975, they bought out the stock of Wahr's, an 80-year-old bookstore that was ending business at 316 South State Street, hiring Michael Hildebrand and Harvey James Robin to manage and stock it with rare books. Hildebrand had managed Gibson's used and rare book department in East Lansing and Harvey Robin had restored rare books and moved his bindery upstairs. Wahr's was previously a textbook and school supplies vendor, but the brothers did not deal in textbooks. They moved the retail bookshop to larger quarters down the street at 303 South State, in the former Wagner and Son men's clothing store. The old shop was renamed Charing Cross Bookshop and Tom Frick was sent from the new bookshop to help.

In 1985, the company opened its second location, in Beverly Hills, Michigan.

The downtown Ann Arbor store moved across the street again in 1994 to 612 East Liberty Street, at the southwest corner of Liberty and State Streets, in the building once occupied by the defunct Jacobson's Department Store. Although not the original location, it was identified as "Borders #1" as the flagship store.

Former Hickory Farms president Robert F. DiRomualdo was hired in 1989 to expand the company.

=== Kmart and Waldenbooks ===
Borders was acquired in 1992 by Kmart, which had also acquired mall-based book chain Waldenbooks eight years earlier. Kmart had struggled with the book division, having tinkered with assortment and later discounting. In the Borders acquisition, Kmart merged the two companies in hopes that the experienced Borders senior management could bail out floundering Waldenbooks. Instead, many of the Borders senior management team left the company, leaving behind an even larger and more unwieldy division for Kmart executives to handle on the heels of aggressive expansions by rivals Barnes & Noble and Crown Books. Facing fiscal problems and pressure from stockholders, Kmart spun off Borders in 1995, in a structured stock-purchase plan. The new company was initially called Borders-Walden Group but renamed Borders Group by year end.

In 1994, Borders briefly operated All Wound Up, a mall-based toy and novelty store. Most All Wound Up stores were seasonal kiosks in shopping malls.

Borders was rumored to open stores in Canada, starting with a 50,000-square-foot (4,600 m^{2}) retail store in Toronto. However, this was rejected for failing to meet Canadian ownership regulations for book retailers.

At one point, the highest-grossing location in the U.S. was a remodeled and expanded store in Puerto Rico, generating $17 million in sales annually. Another notably large and successful location in the U.S. was located at 5 World Trade Center in New York City, but the store sustained damage and was closed following the September 11 attacks.

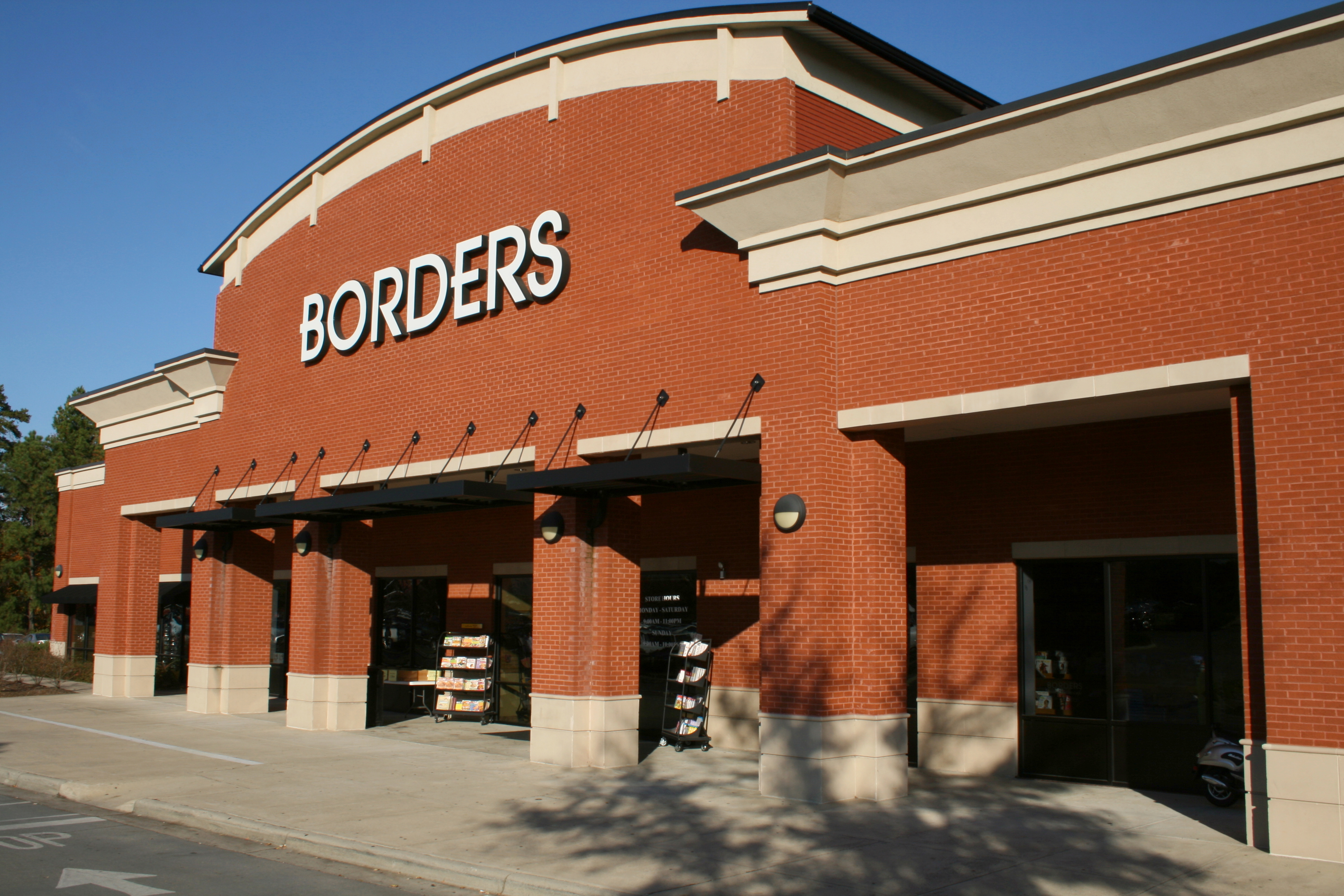
A Borders store in Chapel Hill, North Carolina

=== Changes in business plan ===
In 1998, Philip Pfeffer succeeded Robert DiRomualdo as chief executive.

In 2003, Borders had 1,249 stores using the Borders and Waldenbooks names.

In 2004, Borders arranged for Starbucks subsidiary Seattle's Best Coffee to operate cafes in its domestic superstores under the Seattle's Best brand name.

In March 2007, Borders Group announced it would halve the Waldenbooks outlets to about 300 over the next year.

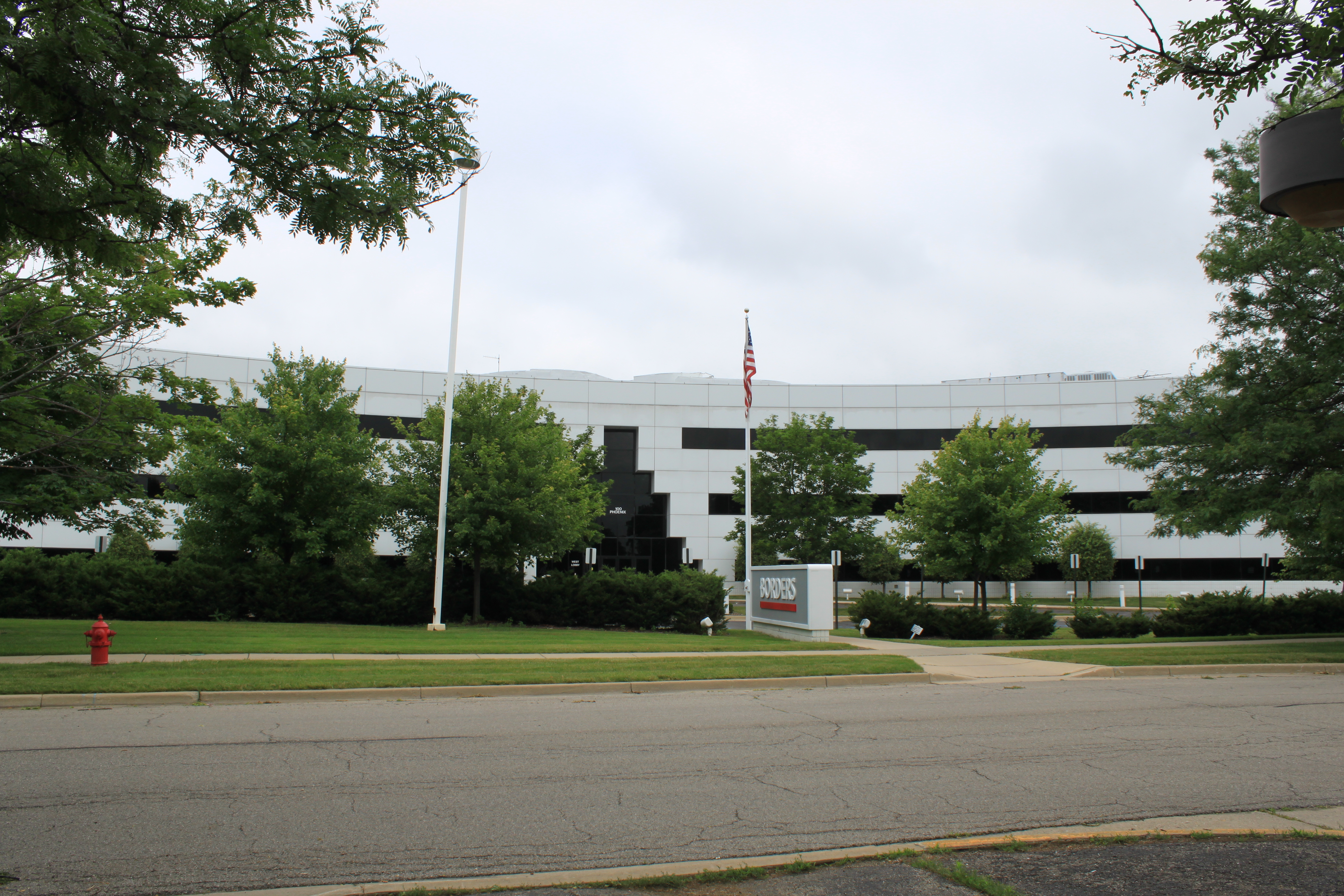
Borders headquarters building, Ann Arbor, Michigan

In 2008, Borders opened 14 concept stores nationwide, including a Digital Center, offering electronic devices such as MP3 players, digital photo frames, and the Sony Reader. The concept stores were located in Ann Arbor, Michigan; Denver, Colorado; Las Vegas, Nevada; Panama City Beach, Florida; Noblesville, Indiana; Monroeville, Pennsylvania; and Alameda, California. The latest Borders Digital Center opened in Alameda in January 2008.

In late 2007, Borders installed digital video monitors in some stores. The monitors displayed special programs, news, sports, and financial information through Ripple Networks, Inc., a California-based marketing service.

Borders Group also launched Borders Rewards, a free program including coupons and opportunities to earn store credit, unlike the Barnes & Noble paid membership discounts program. Following the lead of Barnes & Noble, the chain discontinued Wi-Fi fees in September 2009.

=== Declining profits ===
Borders last annual profit was in 2006, with yearly income dropping by $1 billion over the next four years.

In March 2007, the company ended its marketing alliance with Amazon begun six years earlier, and began plans to launch an online business in early 2008.

In March 2008, Borders Group announced the intention to sell the chain because of financial difficulties. Borders Books was rumored to have approached Barnes & Noble in hopes of a buyout. The chain was in debt, having increased its financial instability by borrowing US$42.5 million in March from Pershing Square Capital Management, the company's major stockholder, to keep the company running through the remainder of the fiscal year. The loan had a very high interest rate of 12.5%, which meant that the chain needed to post a significant profit to stay solvent. Following the announcement of the loan, Borders's shares dropped 28.6% to $5.07/share. The shares continued to drop over the year – on January 28, 2009 the share price was at a low of $0.53; the share price recovered somewhat during 2009, trading at $1.30 on the NYSE on December 11.

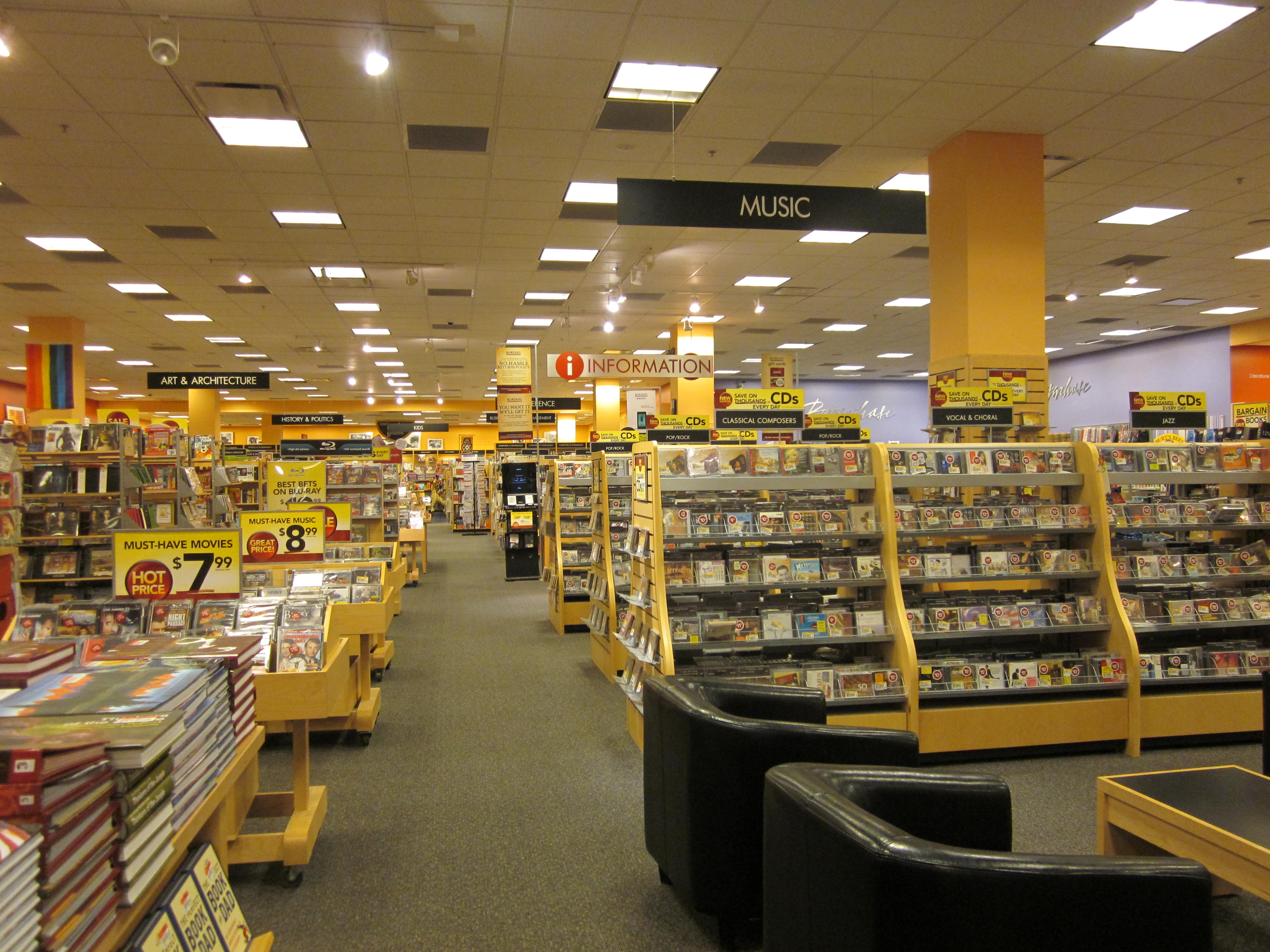
Borders store interior, San Francisco, California

On January 5, 2009, Ron Marshall took over as chief executive. Former CEO George L. Jones received a severance package of $2.09 million. Mark Bierley was promoted to chief financial officer, replacing Ed Wilhelm. The changes in management were due to Borders's holiday sales having fallen by 11.7% to $868.8 million. On January 13, Mick McGuire, a former partner at Pershing Square, became chairman of the board of directors.

On March 30, 2009, Marshall announced that the loan from Pershing Square would be extended for another year (coming due on April 1, 2010), at an interest rate of 9.8%. This, combined with layoffs and new promotional deals with major publishers, caused Borders stock to rise, topping the $1.00 mark within a week. By mid-April, it had approached $2.00. As a result, the company cancelled plans to ask shareholder permission for a reverse stock split.

On August 11, 2009, Borders revealed the replacements for five of the eight-member board of directors, who had previously announced their intentions to quit. The new members included Paul J. Brown of Hilton Hotels, Timothy V. Wolf of MillerCoors, and Dan Rose of Facebook.

On November 5, 2009, Borders announced that it would close some Waldenbooks stores to improve the profitability of its Specialty Retail operations. By January 2010, 182 stores had closed.

Holiday sales figures for 2009 were "disappointing", with total sales of $846.8 million, (~$1.23 billion in 2025) down 14.7% from the previous year. Employees reported major cuts were made in payroll hours.

At the beginning of 2010, the company operated 511 Borders superstores in the United States. The company also operated 175 stores in the Waldenbooks Specialty Retail segment, including Waldenbooks, Borders Express, Borders airport stores, and Borders Outlet stores.

On January 26, 2010, CEO Ron Marshall resigned to become president and CEO of The Great Atlantic & Pacific Tea Co. Following his announcement, Borders stock fell below one dollar per share. During his tenure at Borders, all top executive officers resigned (or were encouraged to leave), including some who had been with the company for over 20 years. Mike Edwards (vice president and chief merchandising officer) was appointed interim CEO.

On March 31, 2010, Borders announced that the Pershing Square loan had been paid in full. In early April, the company's stock rebounded to $2.45 per share.

On May 21, 2010, it was revealed that Bennett S. LeBow, chairman of Vector Group, was making a large private investment in Borders stock. As a result, both LeBow and Howard Lorber, president and CEO of Vector Group, joined the board of directors. Following chairman Mick McGuire's resignation, LeBow was elected chairman of the board. On June 3, LeBow became CEO of Borders Group. Mike Edwards became president of Borders Group and CEO of Borders, Inc., the company's principal subsidiary.

The company reported significant losses for the third quarter, compared to 2009. At the end of 2010, Business Week and BBC News reported that Borders would be delaying its payments to publishers for inventory already received, to preserve liquidity. This was prompted by problems in refinancing its credit facilities.

=== Bankruptcy and liquidation ===
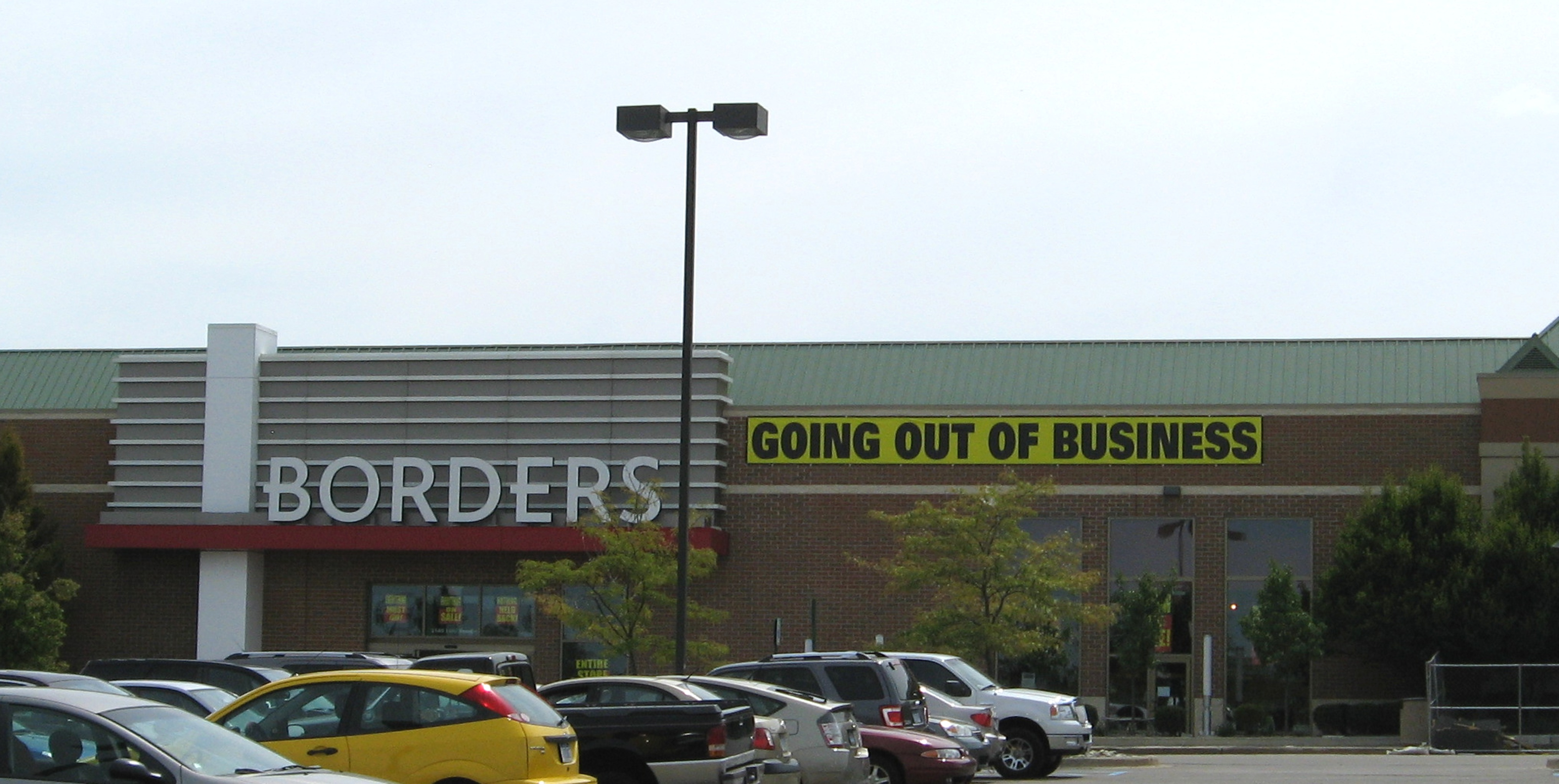
Borders store closing, Pittsfield Township, Michigan

On February 16, 2011, the company announced that it had filed for Chapter 11 bankruptcy protection, listing $1.275 billion in assets and $1.293 billion in debts in its filing. The company also announced the liquidation and closing of 226 stores. Two private-equity firms, The Gores Group and Najafi Companies, expressed interest in purchasing half of the remaining Borders Group stores.

Despite a purchase offer from the private equity firm Najafi Companies, Borders could not find a buyer acceptable to its creditors before its July bidding deadline, so it began liquidating its remaining 399 retail outlets, with the last remaining stores closing in September. Rival bookseller Barnes & Noble acquired Borders's trademarks and customer list.

Borders Group announced on July 1, 2011, that Direct Brands would acquire the assets for $215 million and assume of $220 million in debt.

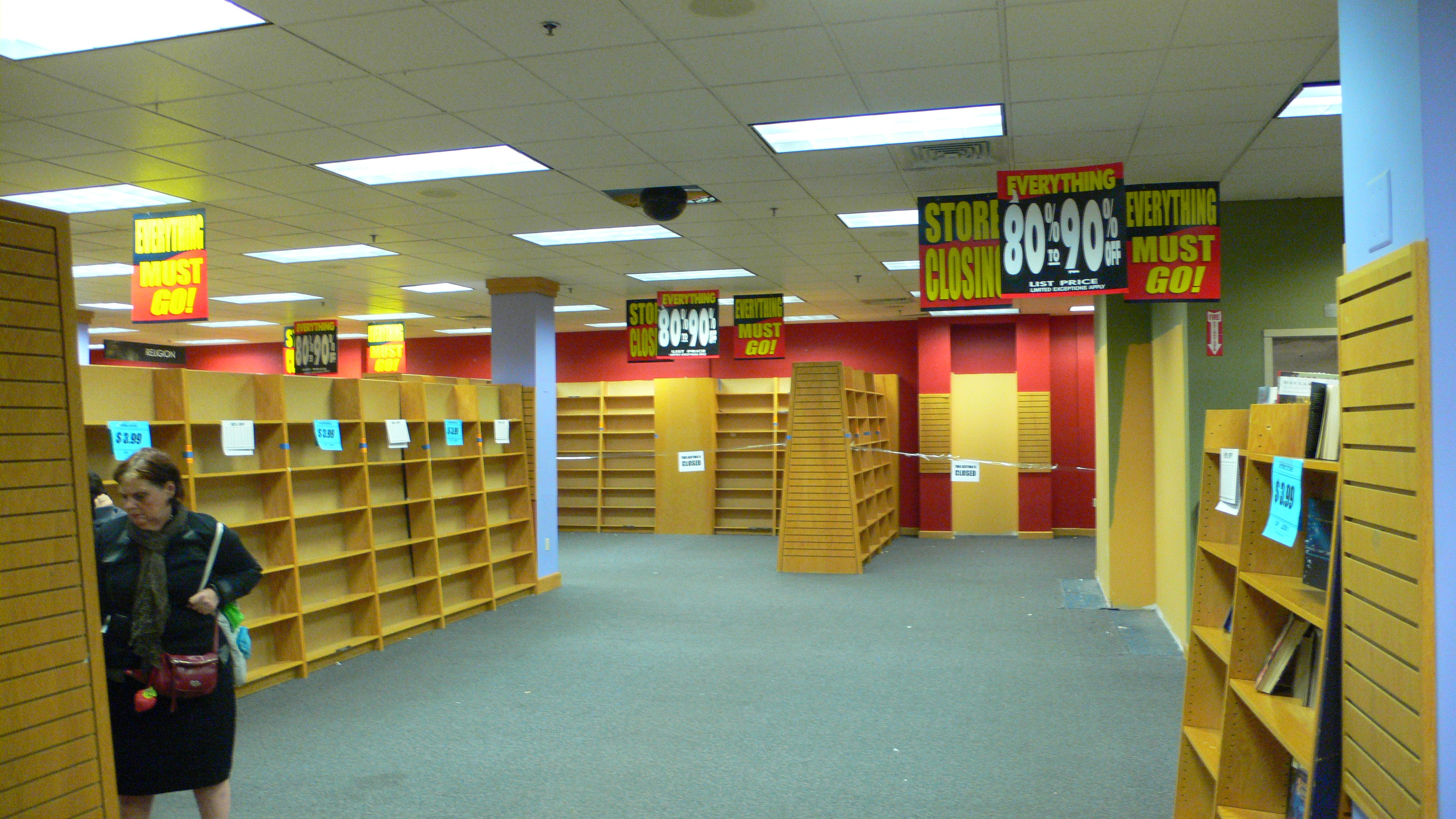
Empty shelves inside the Second Avenue (Manhattan) Borders store in New York City

A group of Borders creditors rejected the Direct Brands takeover bid in July 2011. Borders filed for an auction and the motion was approved; however, the bid deadline expired on July 17 without a bidder. A United States bankruptcy judge approved a petition to liquidate; resulting in the company converting their Chapter 11 case to Chapter 7. On July 22, 2011, Borders started closing its remaining 399 stores with a phased roll-out. Business operations ceased in September 2011. Former rival and the current second-largest chain of bookstores in the United States, Books-A-Million, bid to acquire 30 to 35 stores and their assets on July 19, 2011, the day liquidation was approved by the courts. However, the two sides were unable to come to an agreement.

Books-A-Million again offered to buy portions of Borders Group, purchasing the leases for 21 stores primarily in New England and Pennsylvania. Borders USA closed its remaining stores on Sunday, September 18, 2011.

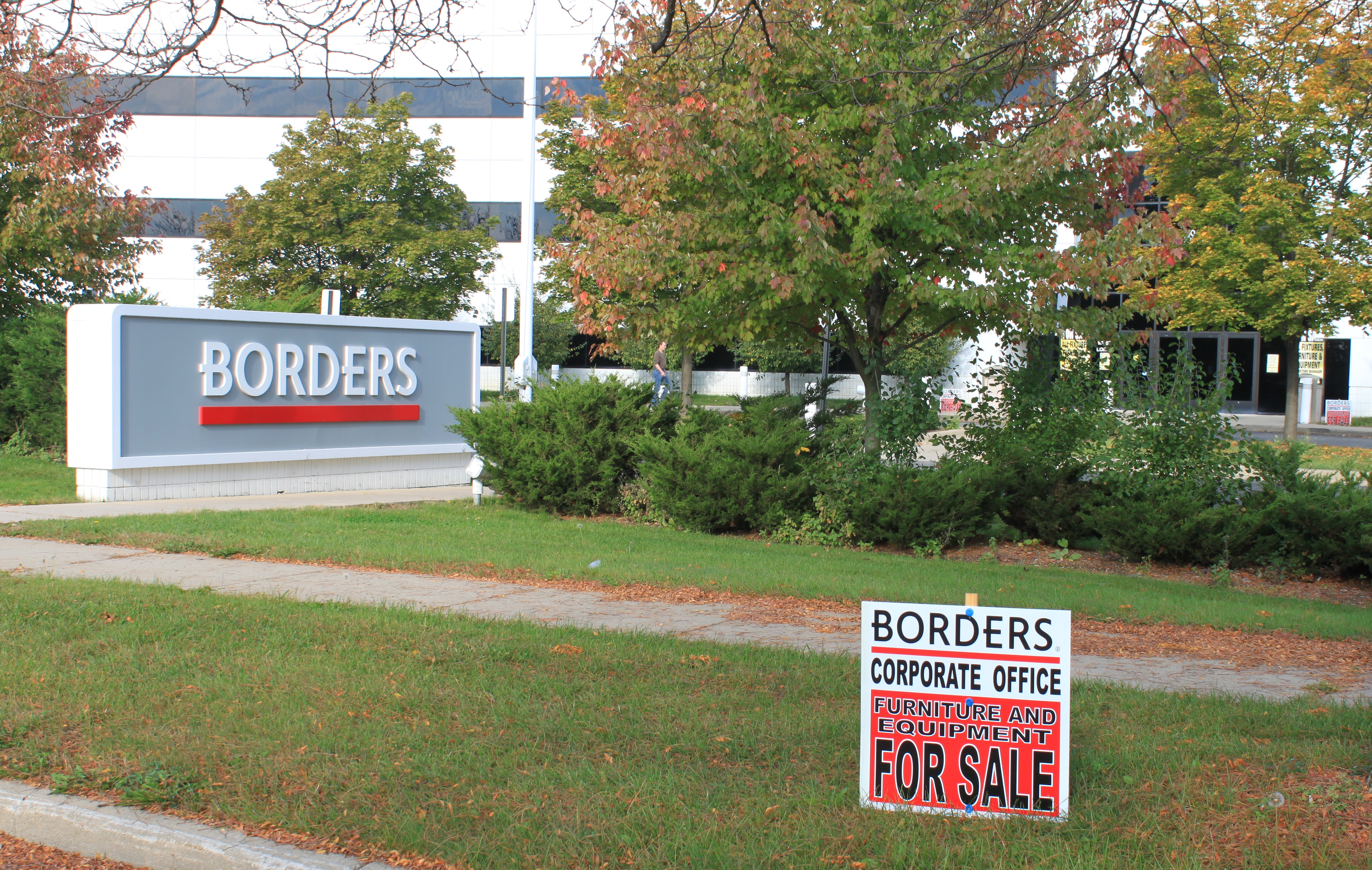
Office equipment 'For Sale' sign at Borders corporate headquarters, 100 Phoenix Drive, Ann Arbor, Michigan

The Borders online store closed on September 27, 2011, at 10:30 pm Eastern. A banner then appeared on their website allowing users to browse, but directed to Barnes & Noble to complete their purchases. All Borders customers had until October 29, 2011, to opt out of their personal contact and purchase information being transferred to Barnes & Noble. On October 1, 2011, Borders cardholders were informed by email: "As part of Borders ceasing operations, we Barnes & Noble acquired some of its assets including Borders brand trademarks and their customer list." The federal bankruptcy court approved this sale on September 26, 2011.

== International operations ==
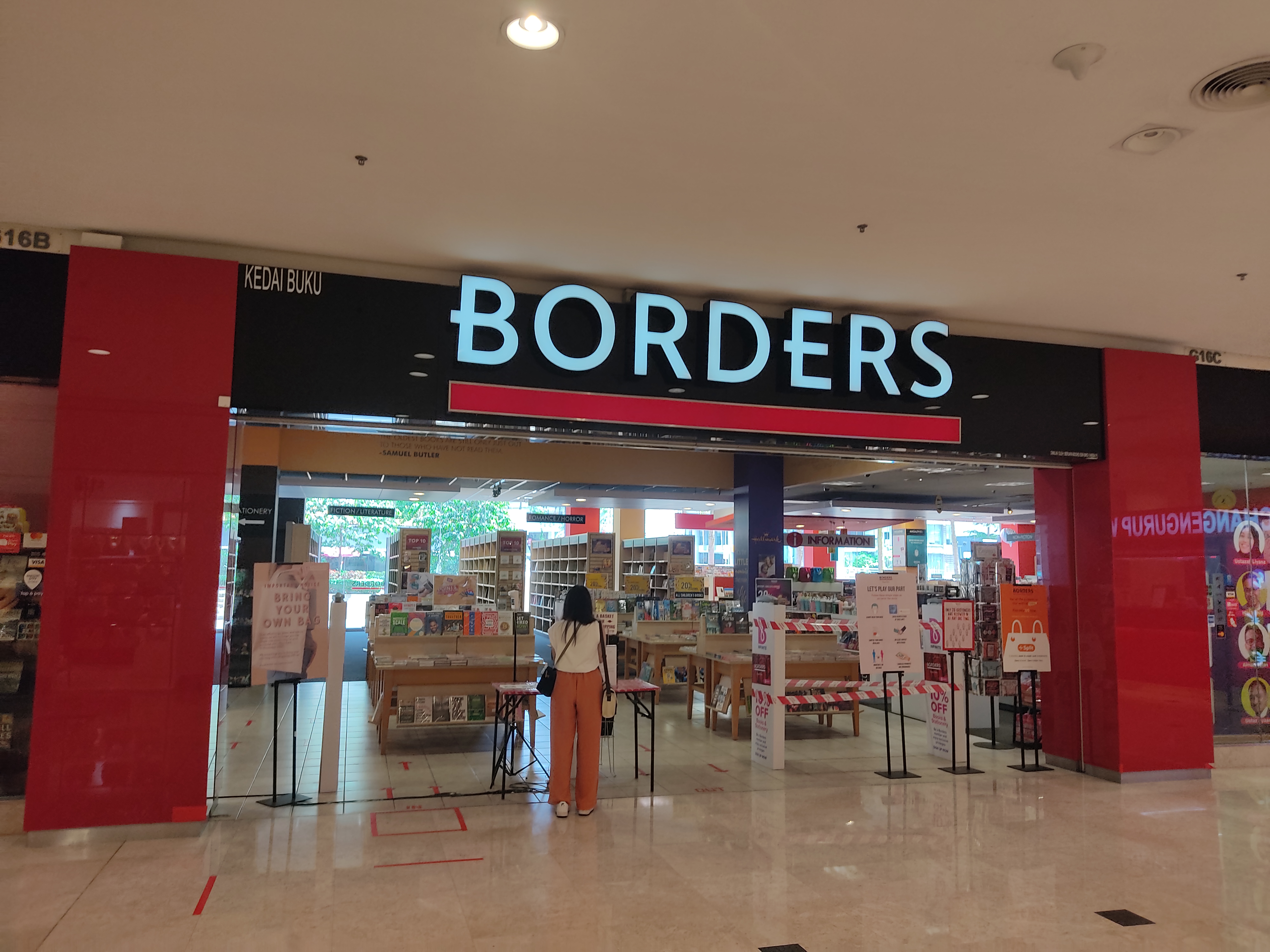
One of the Borders stores in Petaling Jaya, Malaysia

=== Malaysia ===
In April 2005, Borders Group opened its first franchise store with Malaysia's Berjaya Books Sdn. Bhd. in Kuala Lumpur, located in Berjaya Times Square. The store was advertised as the world's largest Borders at 60,000 square feet (5,600 m^{2}); the store lost this status when one level of the store closed. Borders's second store in Malaysia was located in The Curve, Mutiara Damansara. On 7 December 2006, the third opened in Queensbay Mall, Penang, and closed on 26 December 2019.

=== Middle East ===
Borders opened a franchise store in the Mall of the Emirates in Dubai, United Arab Emirates (UAE) in October 2006. Despite financial difficulties in the domestic market, Borders continued to expand its franchises, adding stores in Oman and Sharjah. By the end of 2009, all of the non-franchise overseas locations were sold or closed, leaving only the franchise stores in Dubai and Oman.

Al Maya Group purchased lifetime rights to the Borders brand in the Middle East in 2015, and diversified to books, toys, and stationery. As of 2025, Borders stores still operate in Middle Eastern countries including the United Arab Emirates, Oman, Qatar and Kuwait. These stores are under different ownership and were unaffected by the closures of other stores under the Borders brand.

=== Singapore, Australia, and New Zealand ===
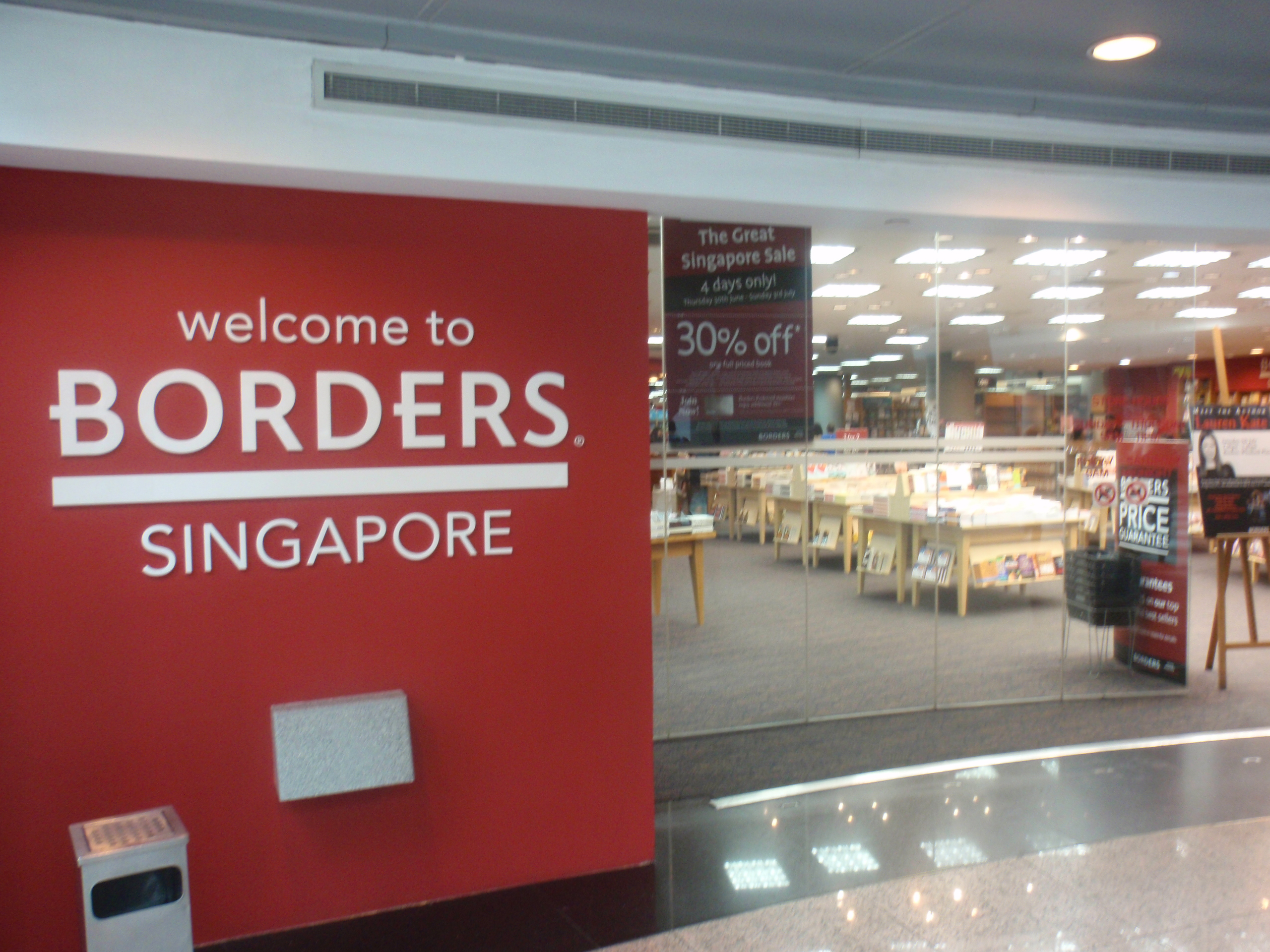
The former flagship in Wheelock Place, now closed

==== 1997 to 2007 ====
In 1997, the company established its first international store in Singapore, occupying 32,000 square feet (3,000 m^{2}) in Wheelock Place, Orchard Road. In the third quarter of 2006, the Wheelock Place store reported the highest revenue generated per square meter among the group's 559 outlets.

==== 2008 to 2011 ====
In 2008, to pay off debt, Borders sold its Australian, New Zealand, and Singaporean stores to Pacific Equity Partners (owner of competitor Angus & Robertson), forming REDgroup Retail. After this transaction, the Borders stores in the US, UK, and Asia/Pacific regions were owned by independent entities.

The stores continued to operate under the Borders brand as the unaffiliated "Borders Asia Pacific" until REDGroup was placed into voluntary administration in February 2011, with Ferrier Hodgson appointed as administrators. The day after the announcement, customers of the remaining stores were informed that gift vouchers could only be redeemed if they also spent an equivalent amount in cash. As of 3 April 2011, unused vouchers became void. The five New Zealand stores were sold to the James Pascoe Group. The Australian stores gradually shut down, with the final group closing in July 2011.

The flagship Borders store at Wheelock Place in Singapore suddenly closed on 16 August 2011, and was forced to empty the location by 23 August 2011. Vouchers and gift cards were no longer accepted by Wheelock Place Borders or the outlet at Parkway Parade. All remaining stock was sold at Singapore Expo Hall 4B, from 2 September 2011 to 6 September 2011. The remaining Singaporean store at Parkway Parade closed on 26 September 2011 at 9 p.m., ending 14 years of sales in Singapore. All remaining stock was marked with a 70% discount three days before its closure. In the final hours of operation, shelves, signs, baskets, and computers at the cashiers' counters were also available for sale.

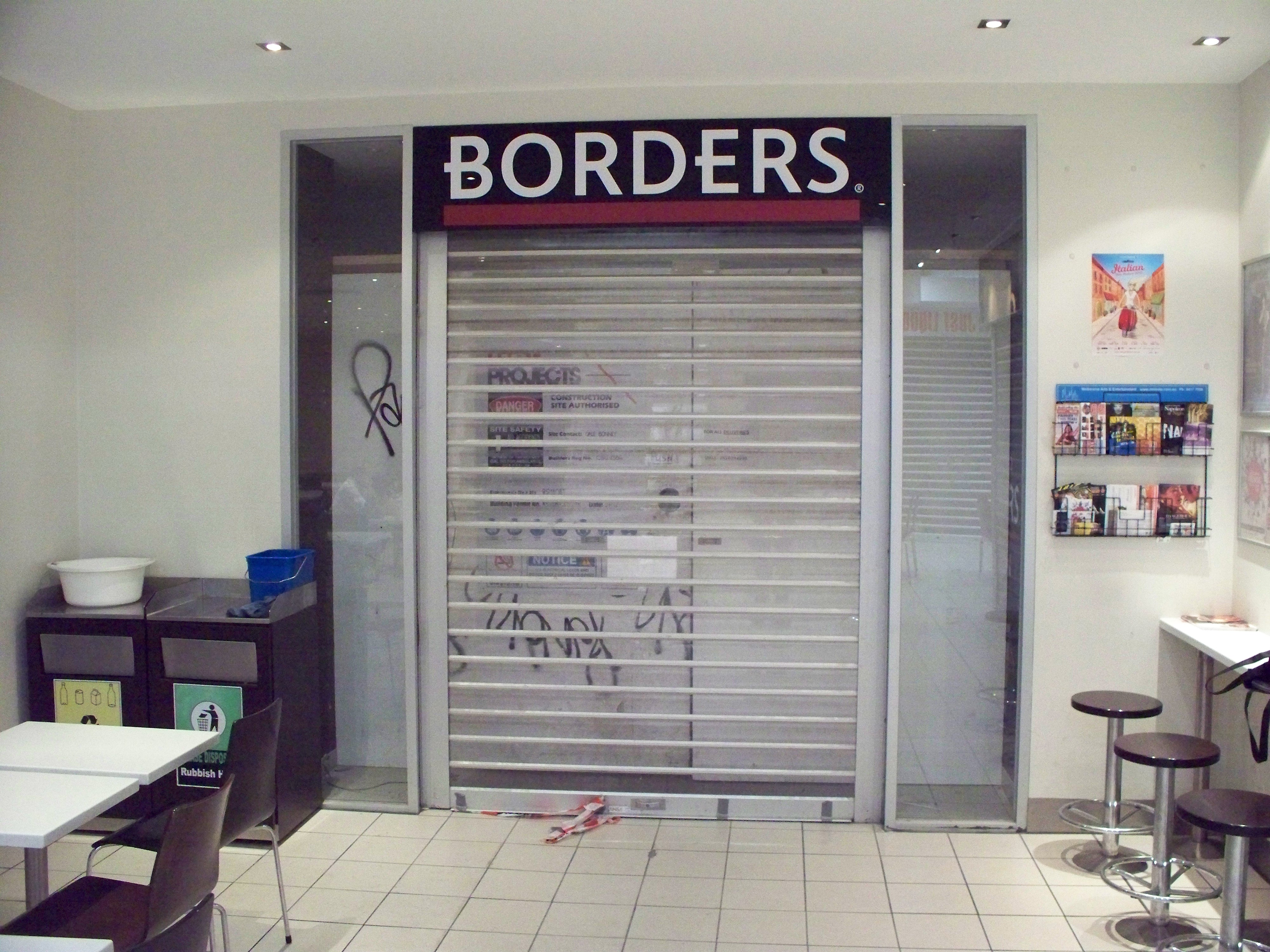
The remaining Borders signage at the back of Lygon Court, Carlton in Melbourne. This picture was taken during renovations in October 2012, preparing for Brunetti Café, to relocate into the space. Borders Lygon Court operated from 2002 until 2011.

The handling of the administration prompted 25 franchised Angus & Robertson stores to sever ties with REDGroup, rebranding themselves as independents. By the end of May, 70 of the 87 REDGroup-owned bookstores in New Zealand had been sold off: 10 airport-based Whitcoulls stores to Australian-based LS Travel Retail Pacific and another 57 Whitcoulls plus five Borders stores to the James Pascoe Group. In total, Borders had 33 stores located across Australia, New Zealand, and Singapore, all of which were closed or sold due to REDgroup Retail going into administration in 2011.

==== 2012 to Present ====
In late July 2012, Pearson Australia Group re-branded the Borders website as Bookworld. Chief Executive James Webber told The Australian, "The Borders brand had lost its former sheen. We just believe the Borders brand has had its day. There are no stores left and globally it's been in demise so we believe there's an opportunity to revitalise (the franchise) and move it forward." [sic] The Bookworld brand was itself also later rebranded as Angus & Robertson.

The Borders brand in Singapore was purchased by Popular Holdings in late 2012. In an attempt to revive the brand, a single Borders store opened in Westgate, Singapore, for a trial period in 2013 but was converted to a Popular bookstore shortly after.

=== United Kingdom and Ireland ===
==== 1997 to 2006 ====
In the United Kingdom, Borders bought Books Etc. Philip and Richard Joseph in 1997. In 1998, Borders (UK) Ltd. was established as a Borders Group subsidiary holding both Borders and Books Etc. stores in the UK and Ireland.

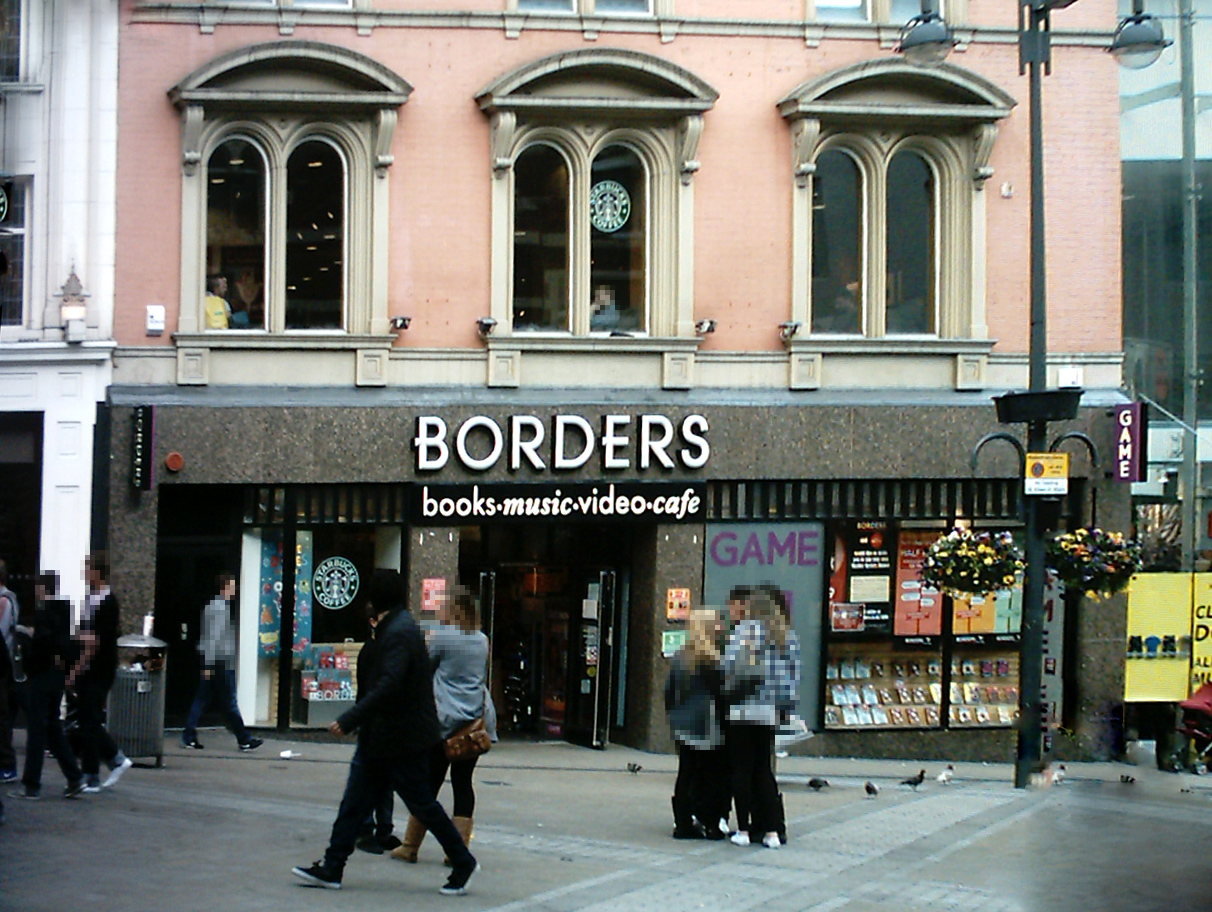
Borders on Briggate in Leeds, West Yorkshire

The chain won numerous awards, including Chain Bookselling Company of the Year 2006 & 2007, Hachette Children's Retailer of the Year 2007, Magazine Destination Retailer of the Year 2007, and Usborne Children's Bookseller of the Year 2008. A typical Borders shop in the UK contained both a Paperchase stationery shop and a Starbucks café.

==== 2007 and 2008 ====
In early 2007, Borders Group Inc. sold 41 Borders and 28 Books Etc. stores in the British Isles to Risk Capital Partners. Borders Group Inc. received £10 million initially as well as retaining a one-sixth stake in the business. The remaining £10M stated in the agreement would be paid out depending on how well the business performed in the future. Bookshop Acquisitions Ltd. - a subsidiary of Risk Capital Partners - was established to manage the Borders and Books Etc. brands.

It was announced that Borders Group would retain the Paperchase stationery business and international expansion would continue via franchising. In the Wall Street Journal, Borders Chief Executive George Jones was quoted stating that the sale of the British Isles stores "allows us to focus investment and resources on our core business, which is the U.S. superstore segment, and gives the U.K. and Ireland business the opportunity to succeed with the focus and investment Risk Capital Partners will bring."

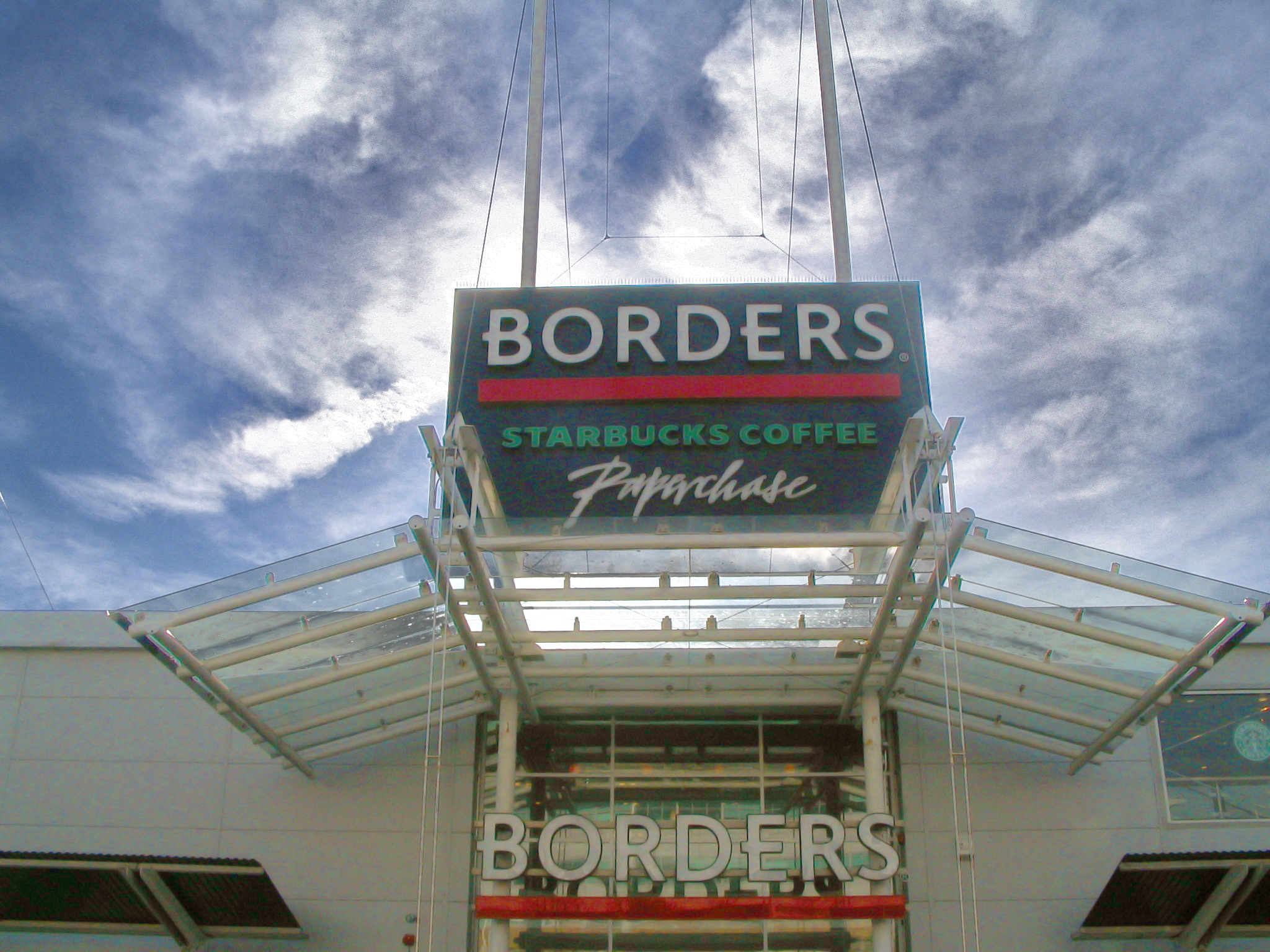
Borders in Southampton

David Roche resigned as Chief Executive Officer (CEO) of Borders (UK) in January 2008, with the former managing director, Philip Downer, taking the role. Downer called for a category review of the entire company, though he made clear there were no immediate plans to further restructure the business.

In March 2008, Borders (UK) announced that it would close its distribution centre (based in Cornwall) on 29 August in favour of having publishers and wholesalers deliver directly to shops. This was opposite to the decision of competitor Waterstones, which planned to test and open its own distribution centre, colloquially referred to as 'The Hub,' at the end of May.

Borders sold eight London Books Etc. shops to Waterstones in August 2008 for an undisclosed sum.

==== 2009 ====
Five Borders shops (Oxford Street, Llantrisant, Blanchardstown, Swindon, and London Colney) were closed in July 2009, replaced by New Look. In July 2009, Valco Capital Partners purchased the Borders and Books Etc. brands in the UK and Ireland. At the end of September 2009, it was announced that most remaining Books Etc. and the two Borders Express shops would be sold, and closing sales began shortly after.

In November 2009, the company began searching for a buyer following liquidity concerns. Borders website stopped taking orders for books, while orders for CDs and DVDs through the Borders Entertainment website continued, as it was run by The Hut Group.

On 26 November 2009, Reuters announced that Borders (UK) entered administration after difficulties raising enough cash to trade through the Christmas season. This article was soon withdrawn and replaced with a corrected item reporting the company was 'mulling' administration. The Guardian reported that this news came after several of Borders's suppliers stopped or reduced the firm's credit limits. Days earlier, negotiations to sell some UK-based stores to WH Smith broke down.

Later that day, Borders (UK) Ltd. officially went into administration. Initially the intention was to appoint BDO as administrators, but a conflict of interest was discovered. MCR was appointed by Valco to act as administrators. A 'parallel strategy' was applied in which MCR stated that they were seeking a buyer for the chain while simultaneously running closing sales.

On 27 November 2009, it was announced that a closing sale would begin in all stores the following day. The publisher Hachette successfully took MCR to court for continuing to sell Hachette titles without first obtaining permission, obtaining a High Court judgement on 18 December 2009 that MCR was "incorrect" to do so.

A spokesman for MCR confirmed that unsuccessful bids had been made that had failed to meet expectations, including an offer from Richard Joseph, co-founder of Books Etc. MCR announced that the 45 stores would cease trading and close their doors permanently on 22 December, claiming that it had not been possible to sell the chain. All staff members were made redundant on 24 December 2009.

==== 2010 to present ====
The Books Etc. name and website, and the Borders database, were purchased by Capital Books Ltd. in January 2010. As of September 2025, Books Etc. still operates as an independent, family-run online business. The logo contained both the Books Etc. logo and the Borders logo to reflect the fact that Borders (UK) operated two different brands. The company Borders (UK) Limited was dissolved in August 2011.

== eBook store ==
In July 2008, Borders (UK) launched an e-commerce website in a bid to try to take back a share of internet sales of books.

On July 7, 2010, Borders opened an eBook store to allow books to be directly downloaded to an e-reader device or a Borders eReader app for the desktop, iPhone, iPad, BlackBerry, or Android. Although branded as a Borders store, it was actually handled by Kobo, Inc.

On June 3, 2011, the Borders eReader apps were changed to Kobo eReader apps and users could transfer their Borders eBooks to their Kobo library.

== See also ==
- Books in the United States
- Retail apocalypse
- List of retailers affected by the retail apocalypse
