= British Home Stores =

International department store retailer

- Trade name: BHS, British Home Stores and The British Home Store
- Type: Private
- Industry: Retail
- Founded: 1928; 98 years ago Brixton, London, England
- Number of locations: 1 store (2025)
- Owner: Al Maya Group
- Website: bhs.com

British Home Stores (BHS) is a department store retailer that primarily sells clothing and household items. It was established as a variety store in 1928 by a group of American entrepreneurs, and grew to be one of the UK's largest department store chains which traded until 2016.

In May 2000, the retailer was purchased by Sir Philip Green and taken private. The company later became part of Green's Arcadia Group in 2009. In March 2015, the retailer was sold to the Retail Acquisitions Ltd consortium for the nominal sum of £1, following sustained losses. In April 2016, British Home Stores entered administration, and the final 22 UK stores closed on 28 August 2016.

In September 2016, BHS.com was relaunched for the UK market by the Al Maya Group, based in Qatar (now based in Dubai), who had purchased the British Home Stores intellectual property from the administrators, and continued to operate physical BHS stores across the Middle East, Africa and other parts of Europe, for a time. In June 2018, Al Maya Group closed BHS.com to focus on other interests. In October 2018, BHS.com was relaunched again by the Manchester-based firm Litecraft Group Ltd, using the BHS brand under license from Al Maya Group, to mainly sell their range of lighting products.

As of June 2025, Al Maya Group operates 1 final surviving physical British Home Stores location at the Landmark Mall in Doha, Qatar.

== History ==
=== Origins ===
British Home Stores was founded in 1928 by a group of U.S. entrepreneurs who wanted to follow the successful model set by Woolworths. They did not want go into direct competition with Woolworths, so set their highest price at a shilling. The first store opened in Brixton, and by 1929 the price limit had been lifted to five shillings to allow the business to offer more goods.

The business expanded by opening further branches, all offering small cafeterias and grocery departments, and in 1933 the business went public. After the war, the business continued to grow, and by the end of the 1960s had 94 stores nationwide.

=== Expansion ===
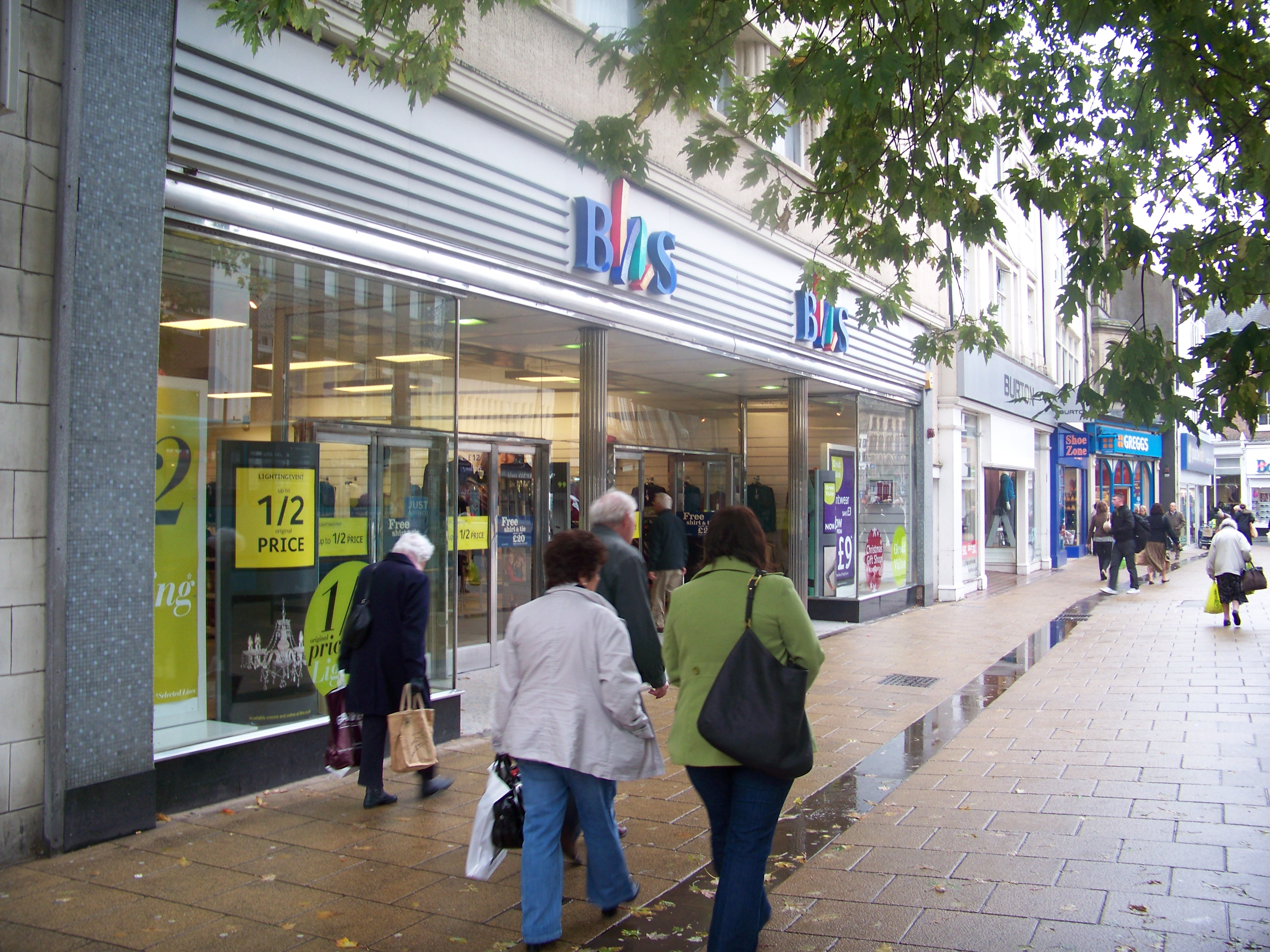
A BHS branch in pre-1995 branding seen in Darlington in 2009

The company expanded in the 1970s and 1980s, and was a member of the FTSE 100 when that index was launched in 1984. Stores were opened in the developing wave of indoor shopping centres, such as Broadway Shopping Centre and Lakeside Shopping Centre. A joint venture was launched with supermarket retailer Sainsbury's to create hypermarkets using the SavaCentre brand; Sainsbury's took full control of SavaCentre in 1989, and later converted the stores to the Sainsbury's branding.

A downturn in business in the early 1980s was countered with a revamp of the stores and the selling of goods with higher profit margins. The company closed its only overseas store, in Dublin, Ireland, during this time (although there was a rapidly aborted re-entry in 1996 via a franchise store in Dublin's Jervis Centre). In 1985, the first overseas franchise store opened in Gibraltar. Such stores, not directly owned by the BHS company but supplied with BHS products, have operated in several places in Europe and the Middle East. The Tammy brand was available as a separate franchise.

In its stores, BHS sold a mixture of basic electricals based primarily on kitchen products such as kettles and toasters. Latterly the range had begun to increase, particularly in the designated Home stores and larger high street branches. Ranges introduced included Breville, Russell Hobbs, De'Longhi and Vax. In addition, BHS began to sell larger electrical items through a separate website, bhsdirect.co.uk. The service was run through a third-party company, Buy it Direct, and was not directly controlled by BHS. This allowed the company to expand its product range to laptops, tablets, and large kitchen appliances such as fridge-freezers, TVs and air-conditioners.

In 1986, BHS merged with Habitat and Mothercare to form Storehouse plc. Soon afterwards, the British Home Stores registered company name and branding across its shops was replaced with "BhS" (later "Bhs", and since reverted to the all-caps "BHS", which the company used in addition to the full British Home Stores name prior to the full rebrand) and a new corporate logo. The exception was in stores that displayed a "historic" fascia, such as that in Edinburgh's Princes Street, which continued to feature the British Home Stores name in its original Roman type etched into the granite shop front.

British Home Stores, like many other major retailers, followed a trend of opening stores at out-of-town locations since the 1980s. One of these was the two-level store at Merry Hill Shopping Centre in the West Midlands (which formed part of an Enterprise Zone). This store opened on 14 November 1989, ultimately replacing the store in nearby Dudley, which closed in June 1990 after a directly related sharp fall in turnover. The nearby West Bromwich store closed around the same time, its fortunes also affected by the Merry Hill development and smaller developments around nearby Oldbury, which had begun with the SavaCentre hypermarket in 1980.

=== Takeover by Philip Green ===
Logo used from 1995 to 2010

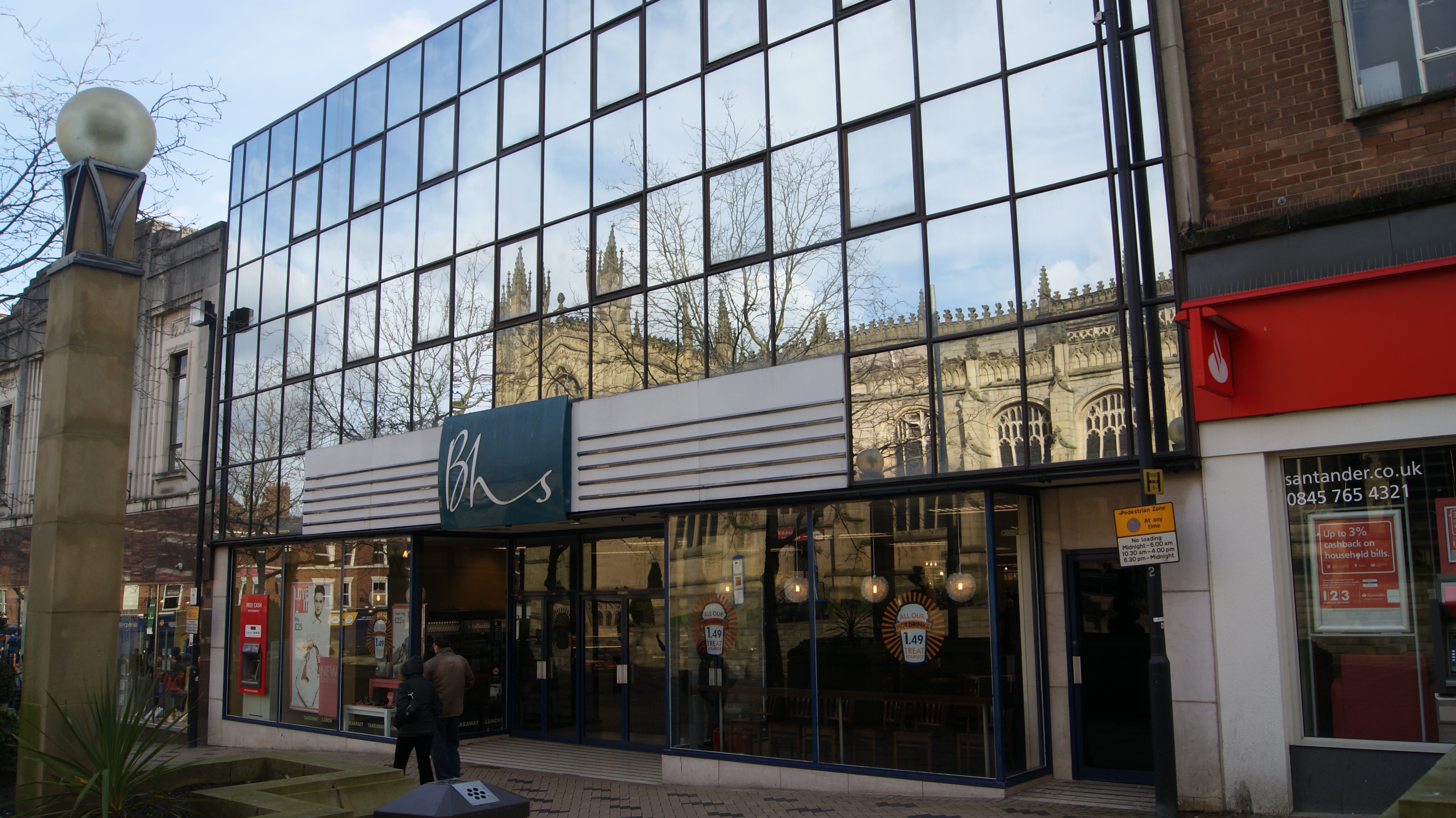
A branch in 1995–2010 branding seen in Wakefield in 2013

In the mid-1990s, the brand saw a further reinvention under guidance from retail design house '20:20'. The new look was showcased with the launch of the "millennium concept" shopfit, initially at the Grafton Centre, Cambridge during 1995. With its softer Bhs "signature" logo and warm interior lighting, the concept attempted with varying degrees of success to meet the needs of the modern, more sophisticated shopper.

In 1995, BHS was the first high street retailer to open a branch in Moscow. The £3 million venture was the largest in the international portfolio and was quickly followed by the opening of a second store in St Petersburg. Further stores opened in Uzbekistan and Kazakhstan in 1998, and there were stores in Saudi Arabia, Kuwait, Dubai, Oman, Qatar, Bahrain and Abu Dhabi. By 2000 the chain also had stores in Greece, Tenerife, Gibraltar, Malta and the Far East.

During the late 1990s, the stores which formed Storehouse Plc fell on hard times; BHS and Mothercare were the worst affected. Following a number of years of tough trading, Philip Green bought BHS from Storehouse Plc in May 2000 for £200 million. He then changed the company from public (Plc) to private (Ltd). In 2002, Green went on to acquire the Arcadia Group of high street retailers, which included Topshop, Burton, Evans, Dorothy Perkins and Wallis among others, to form Britain's second largest clothes retailer, after Marks and Spencer. Alan Smith, chairman of Storehouse at the time of the Bhs sale, commented, "He [Philip Green] had a crystal-clear vision and strategy. He had the guts to do the deal, to make it work when nobody else thought he could."

In early 2006 a new franchise, "Bhs Kids", was launched in the Middle East, carrying many best-selling children's lines from BHS stores.

=== Return to British Home Stores ===
In May 2005, Green, owner of BHS, purchased Etam UK from its French owner, Etam Développement. The Etam UK brands included Etam, Amelie May, and Tammy. The girls' fashion retailer Tammy was the strongest brand in terms of sales and consumer recognition. For this reason, and to help improve girls' perception of BHS as a whole, from September 2005 stand-alone stores were closed and the brand integrated into BHS stores.

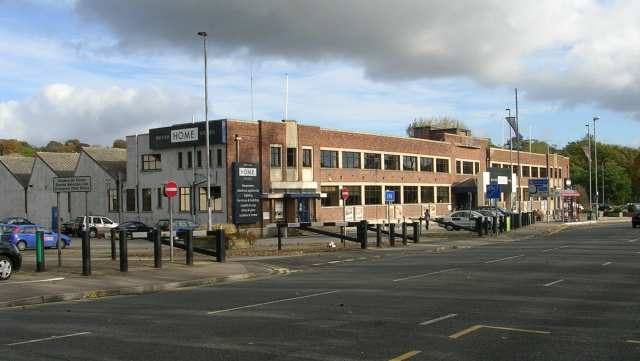
A branch in 'British Home Stores' branding in Kirkstall, Leeds

In 2005, BHS resurrected its British Home Stores fascia, more than 20 years after it had disappeared from the UK high street. The move followed the purchase of several former Allders at Home sites from the department store chain. These projects were designed to build upon the success of the homewares and lighting that BHS stores currently offered and to tap into new areas of business such as furniture, curtains, rugs, and wall art. Brands sold included Denby, Maxwell Williams, Typhoon, Brabantia, Terence Conran and Jasper Conran.

In 2005, Green's wife, a Monaco resident, received a £1.2 billion dividend from Arcadia.

On 27 February 2009, it was announced that the company would be integrated into the Arcadia Group. Central support functions were merged and selected BHS stores housed selected Arcadia brands; for example, in July 2009, BHS stores in Solihull in the West Midlands and Bexleyheath in South London both opened Evans and Wallis concessions. In August 2009, the Canterbury branch opened Wallis and Evans concessions within the store. Other stores with Arcadia insertions included Tunbridge Wells, Oxford, Peterborough, Watford, Kilmarnock, Nottingham, Camberley, Norwich and Aberdeen.

=== Leadership changes ===
Logo used from 2010 to 2015 (2010–2013 variant had no stripe)

Mike Goring was appointed managing director to the chain in May 2009, and in July, Jacquie Gray was appointed Creative Director. In 2010, BHS changed its logo, resurrecting the uppercase form of the abbreviation that had not been used since the Storehouse rebrand and the later rebrand in the 1990s. A new e-commerce website was launched, and a new store design was gradually introduced across the estate.

In 2011, a store in Armenia opened.

Goring left BHS in 2012 to take up the position of Retail Director for Debenhams. After he left, former Marks and Spencer Menswear Trading Director, Richard Price was appointed managing director. Gray left in 2014.

In 2013, a franchised concession opened in the Falkland Islands and a store was opened in Ulaanbaatar, Mongolia.

In January 2014, it was announced that the chain would sell branded food products; the service was to be trialled in 50 stores with the intention of making this a permanent addition in up to 150 stores. The first of three trial stores opened in Staines in March 2014, and was shortly followed by another in Warrington and a third in Romford.

The company had an independent furniture website, bhsfurniture.co.uk. The stores and website sold a number of leading brands including Italsofa, G Plan, Relyon and Silentnight. Larger homes stores, such as the Barton Square branch in the Trafford Centre, Greater Manchester, also sold the Welle cabinet range and had Sharps showrooms.

In December 2014, New Zealand-based childrenswear brand Pumpkin Patch was introduced into larger stores and online.

In January 2015, Green confirmed that he was considering selling the company following sustained losses, and that he had received a number of approaches.

=== Sale and restructuring ===
On 12 March 2015, it was announced that BHS had been sold to Retail Acquisitions for a nominal price of £1. It was also confirmed that Richard Price had left his post as managing director for a position with the clothing arm of Tesco; former BHS Chief Operating Officer Darren Topp was confirmed as the interim Chief Executive. Shortly after the takeover, 51 of the company's 171 stores were reported as being under threat of closure.

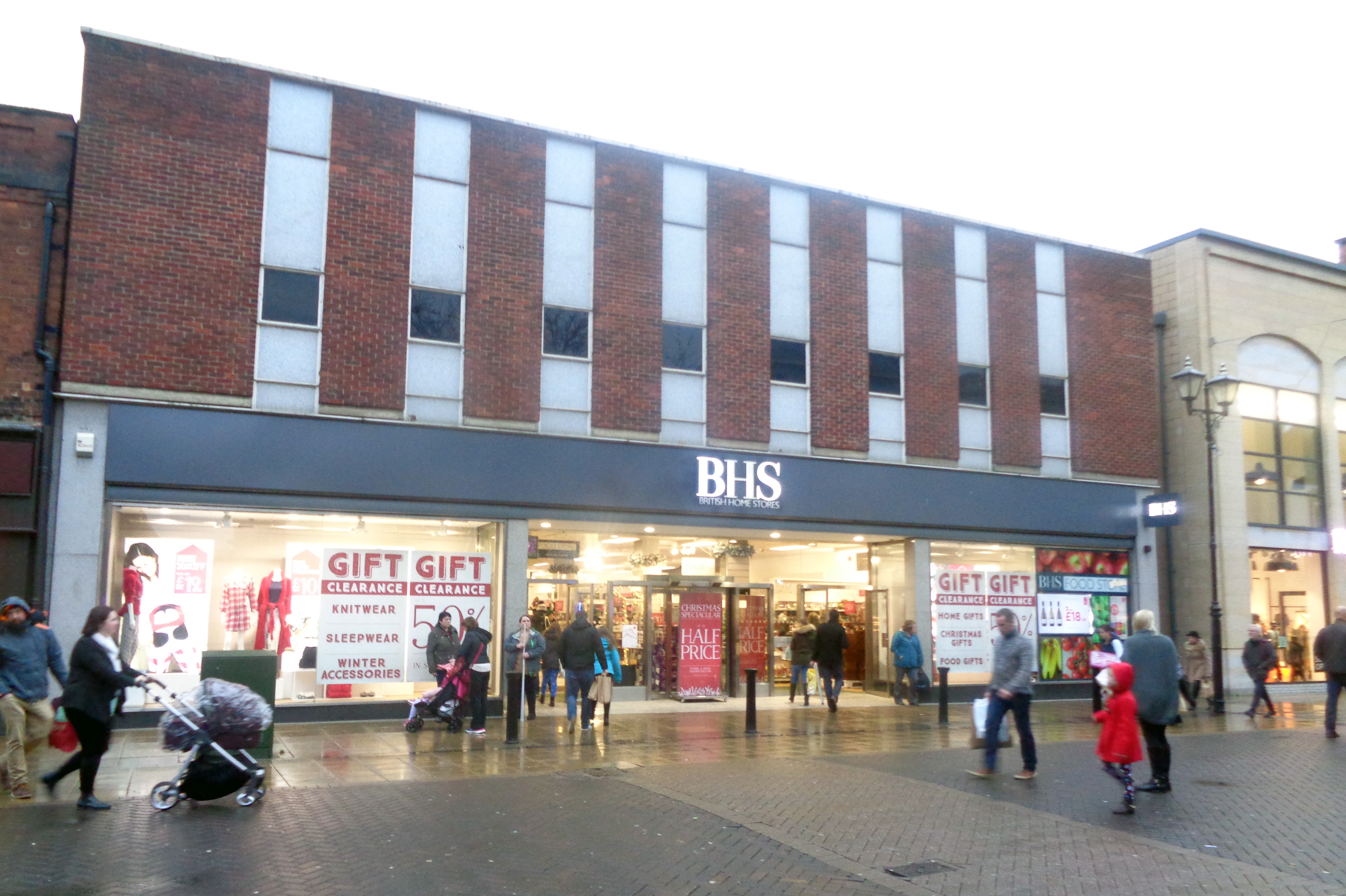
A branch with post-2015 branding in Lincoln in 2015

In September 2015, BHS owners Retail Acquisitions announced another rebrand, as part of a £60m rejuvenation plan, which resulted in the full British Home Stores name being resurrected on the high street for the first time since 1986. A programme of modernising stores with the new branding was announced, while plans to roll out food halls were to continue.

By early 2016, periodic store closures had seen the company withdraw entirely from several city centres including Bath, Cardiff, Carlisle, Oxford, Reading and Southampton. Plans were also being made to reduce the size of the flagship Oxford Street branch by leasing excess space to other retailers.

In March 2016, the company sought a company voluntary arrangement (CVA) to allow it to restructure the business. As part of its application, it revealed a deficit in its pension scheme of £207 million, and sought to transfer its schemes to the Pension Protection Fund. A consortium led by the banker Nicholas de Scossa was involved in negotiations to buy the company.

=== Administration ===
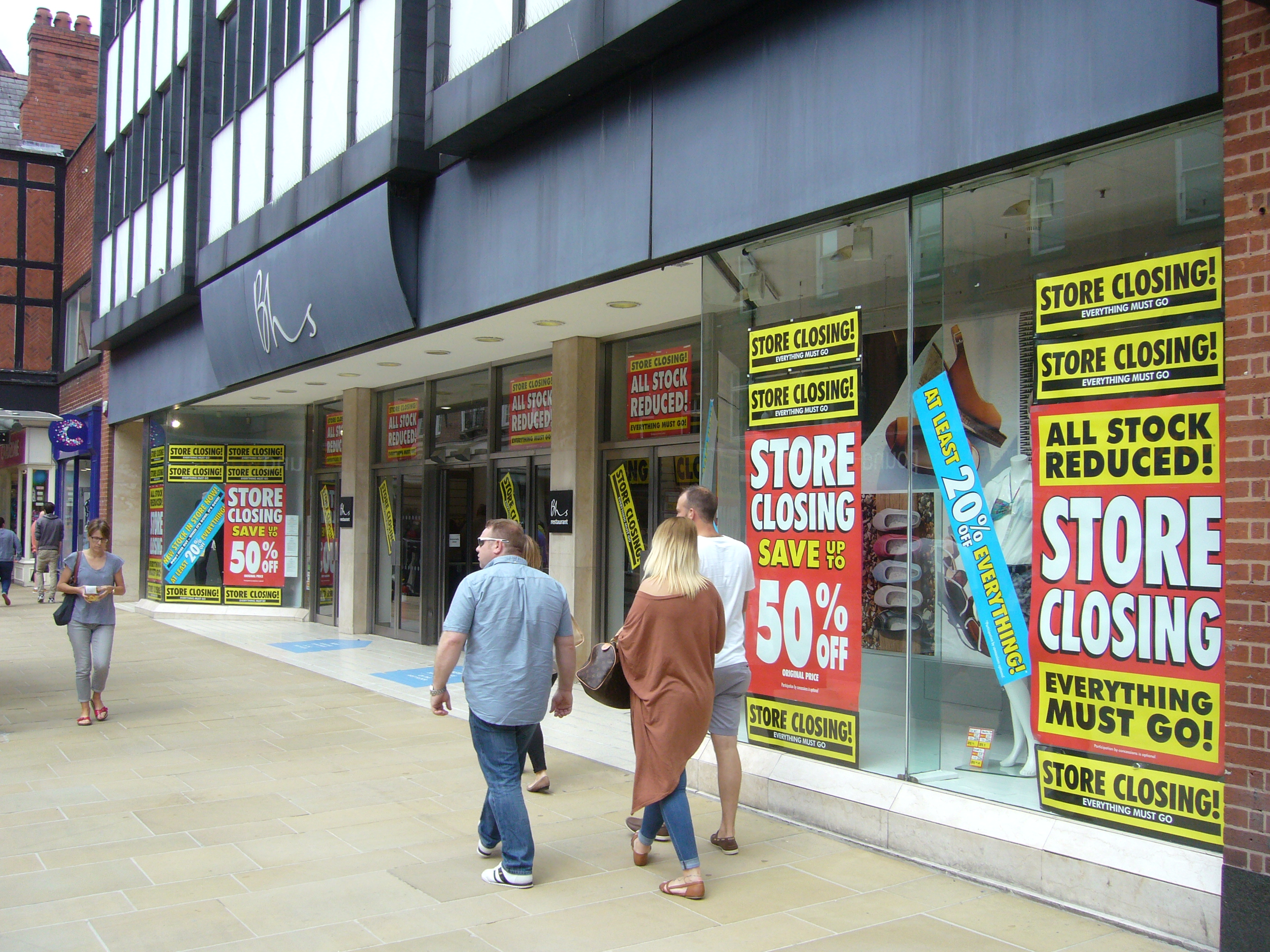
BHS on Foregate Street, Chester in July 2016, during their closing down sale

On 24 April 2016, Dominic Chappell (owner of Retail Acquisitions) announced that administrators would be appointed the next day. It was announced that the chain had entered administration on 25 April 2016, putting 11,000 jobs at risk. Duff & Phelps were appointed administrators and sought to sell the business as a going concern. It at this point had debts of £1.3 billion including £571 million in pension liabilities, meaning either individual assets (such as stores) would have to be sold or the chain would be in new ownership. UK sports chain Sports Direct was reported to be in talks to buy a number of BHS stores, but no buyer was found for the company, resulting in the closure of BHS stores. Head office staff were made redundant on the announcement that no buyer had been found, with stores expected to last up to 8 weeks selling the remaining stock.

In July 2016, a committee of the UK parliament issued a report titled "Leadership failures and personal greed led to collapse of BHS". The Guardian reported "Sir Philip Green's reputation ripped apart in damning report on BHS demise. MPs say retailer's former owners subjected it to 'systematic plunder' and describe the collapse as 'unacceptable face of capitalism'".

On 23 July 2016, the administrators Duff and Phelps shut 20 stores, and the next week another 30. Closure of the final outlets was on 28 August 2016. The insolvent part of the company finally went into liquidation on 2 December 2016, with the remainder of winding up proceedings commencing on that date.

==== 2024 legal disputes over administration process ====
In June 2024, the High Court ordered two former directors of the company, Lennart Hennington and Dominic Chandler, to pay £18m, made up of £13m for wrongful trading, and £5m for breach of corporate duties. This was as a result of legal action brought by the liquidator on behalf of the creditors. A further hearing is due in June 2024, at which a final decision will be made on the total amount to be paid by the two men.

== Legacy ==
=== Middle East, Africa and European operations ===
Upon closure of the UK stores, Al Maya Group still traded international BHS stores across the Middle East, Africa and Europe. As of June 2025, one final BHS store trades in Qatar.

=== BHS.com relaunch ===
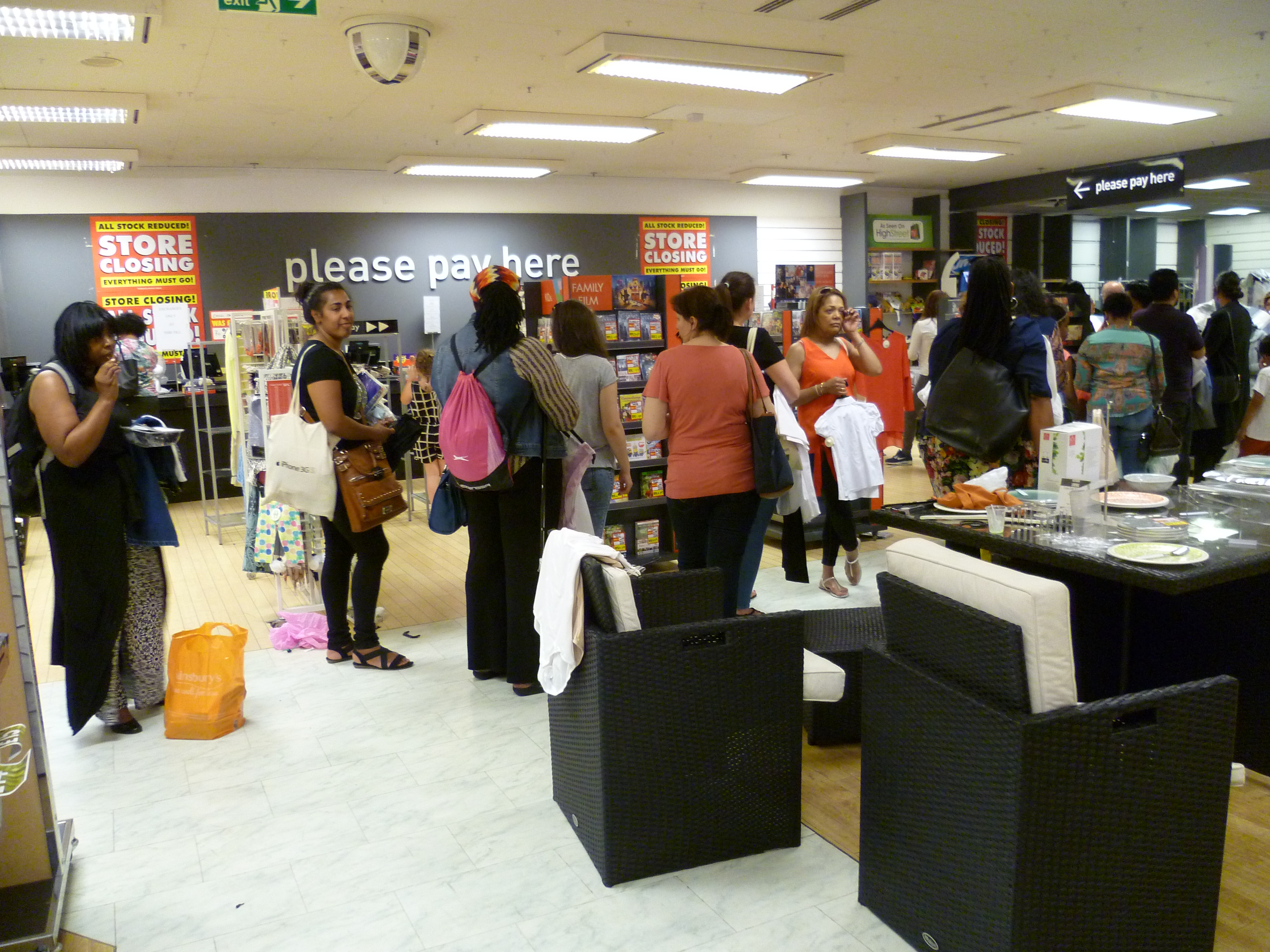
BHS customers queue during a closing down sale at Wood Green, London

The Qatari Al Maya Group purchased the company's international franchise stores and online operations in June 2016. The group formed a new business, BHS International (UK) Limited, based in London. It launched a website, bhs.com, under the new brand name "The British Home Store" in September 2016. Al Maya announced that the website would close by 27 June 2018, shifting focus to their international franchise business. The bhs.com website has since become operated by Litecraft Group Limited in October 2018, a private company using the BHS logo brand name under licence. The website sells lighting and selected homewares.

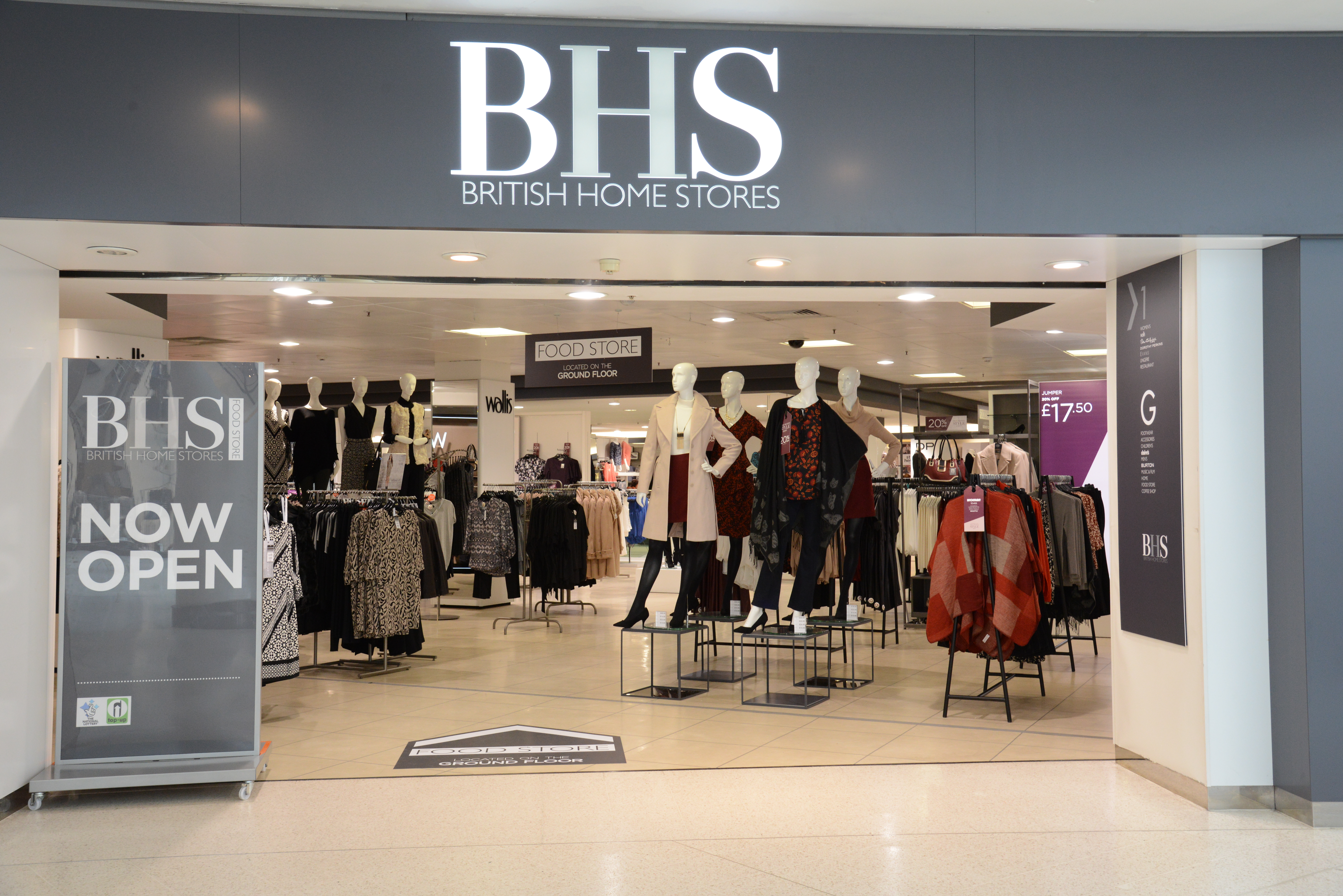
The Watford BHS branch sporting new branding, announcing the opening of its Food Store
