= Al Maya Group =

Supermarkets chain in UAE

- Type: Proprietorship
- Industry: Retail
- Founded: 1982; 44 years ago
- Founder: L. K. Pagarani
- Headquarters: Dubai, United Arab Emirates
- Brands: Al Maya Supermarket; British Home Stores
- Number of employees: 1,001-5,000 (2021)
- Website: www.almaya.ae

Al Maya Group is an Emirati-based retail chain in the United Arab Emirates and Qatar, it operates supermarkets all over the Gulf Cooperation Council (GCC) countries, with around 40 outlets in the UAE.

== Brands ==
In 1985, the Group acquired the British Home Stores (BHS) franchise for the Northern Emirates. In 2016, it bought the global intellectual property rights to the BHS name, and still trades a single store in Qatar.

In 2006, Al Maya Group signed a franchise agreement with Borders for the entire GCC. In 2015, Al Maya purchased lifetime rights to the Borders brand in the Middle East and subsequently diversified it into a merchandise mix consisting of books, toys and stationery.
