= REDgroup Retail =

Former parent company of the Australian and New Zealand divisions of Borders

- Type: Subsidiary
- Industry: Retail (Specialty); Pop-up Retail; Bookstores; Online shopping
- Founded: 1998; 28 years ago
- Defunct: February 2011; 15 years ago
- Headquarters: Melbourne, Australia
- Owner: Pacific Equity Partners
- Number of employees: 2,500
- Divisions: Borders (Asia Pacific); Angus & Robertson; Whitcoulls
- Website: redgroupretail.com

REDgroup Retail was the former parent (private equity) company of the Australian and New Zealand divisions of Borders. It also owned other retail entities such as Angus & Robertson in Australia and Whitcoulls in New Zealand.

REDgroup Retail also owned a number of specialty retail stores such as the Pop-up Retail chain, the Calendar Club in Australia and New Zealand along with the Supanews chain.

REDgroup, which was owned by Pacific Equity Partners, went into administration in 2011 after collapsing due to high debts, a downturn in retail trade, competition from online sellers, and high rents charged by shopping malls. Angus & Robertson and Borders Australia stores were closed or sold; the names and websites were sold to Pearson. About 25 breakaway franchisees tried to end their agreements but administrator Ferrier Hodgson took action against them in the New South Wales Supreme Court.

Whitcoulls was sold to the James Pascoe Group.
