= HomeGrocer =

Online supermarket business

HomeGrocer.com
- Industry: Online retailer
- Founded: 1997
- Defunct: 2000
- Fate: Merger acquisition by Webvan in 2000
- Headquarters: Bellevue, Washington, then Kirkland, Washington
- Key people: James Fierro (co-Founder), Mike Donald (co-Founder), Terry Drayton (CEO), Ken Deering (SVP, Storefront), Bob Duffy (CTO), Jon Landers (SVP, Marketing)
- Number of employees: 2400

HomeGrocer.com, Inc. was an online supermarket business.

The company was originally started in 1997 by Terry Drayton, Mike Donald, James Fierro and Ken Deering.

== History ==
The product selection was a complete alternative to the traditional supermarket at comparable prices with a reputation they earned for top quality fresh produce, seafood and meat.

Deliveries were made in custom tri-temperature trucks with the distinctive HomeGrocer peach logo.

Customer support was very strong and new facilities were opened in Portland, OR in May 1999, in Renton, WA in September 1999, in Irvine, CA in October 1999, in Fullerton, CA in January 2000, in Carson, CA in February 2000 in Azusa, CA in March, 2000, in San Diego, CA in April 2000 and in Dallas, TX in May, 2000.

Each of these new facilities operated 7 days a week and all were 100,000 sq ft (9,300 m^{2}) with 50 delivery vehicles and a staff of 200. Daily sales reached over $1M per day by June 2000, at which time a total of 16 additional HomeGrocer facilities were under construction in markets including Atlanta, GA, Chicago, IL, Washington, DC. and Denver, CO.

HomeGrocer developed all of its own technology including its award winning website, its wireless picking systems that used WiFi, and its driver "smart phones", all years before they were mainstream.

HomeGrocer completed a $288M IPO in March 2000 underwritten by Morgan Stanley and DLJ but needed more capital to meet the aggressive roll-out that was already well underway. With the onset of the dot-com boom, this capital became unavailable at any price, thereby leaving the company few alternatives to survive. In September 2000, stockholders approved a $1.2B all stock buyout by the cash-rich competitor Webvan of the much larger HomeGrocer.com.

HomeGrocer was rebranded to Webvan, the management team fired and the technology and processes converted to Webvan. Eight different HomeGrocer facilities converted to Webvan saw overnight sales declines of one-third, then over 50% within two weeks and never recovered. Formerly profitable HomeGrocer facilities quickly ended up with significant losses. Studies of what happened after the merger were not kind to the original Webvan management who spent over $500M before going bankrupt less than a year later.

HomeGrocer sales peaked in November 2000 at over $1.5M, per day making it the largest Internet grocery business ever created, until UK-based Ocado exceeded it in 2010. The HomeGrocer brand was purchased out of bankruptcy and eventually ended up being owned by Amazon.com.

== Funding ==
HomeGrocer raised a total of $440M in investments from Kleiner Perkins Caufield & Byers, Amazon.com, John Malone of Liberty Media, Solstice, Martha Stewart and Jim Barksdale.
