= Webvan =

American online grocery business (1996–2001)

- Industry: Online retailer
- Founded: 1996; 30 years ago
- Defunct: June 2001
- Fate: Bankruptcy
- Headquarters: Foster City, California, U.S.
- Products: Grocery
- Number of employees: 3,500 (at its peak)

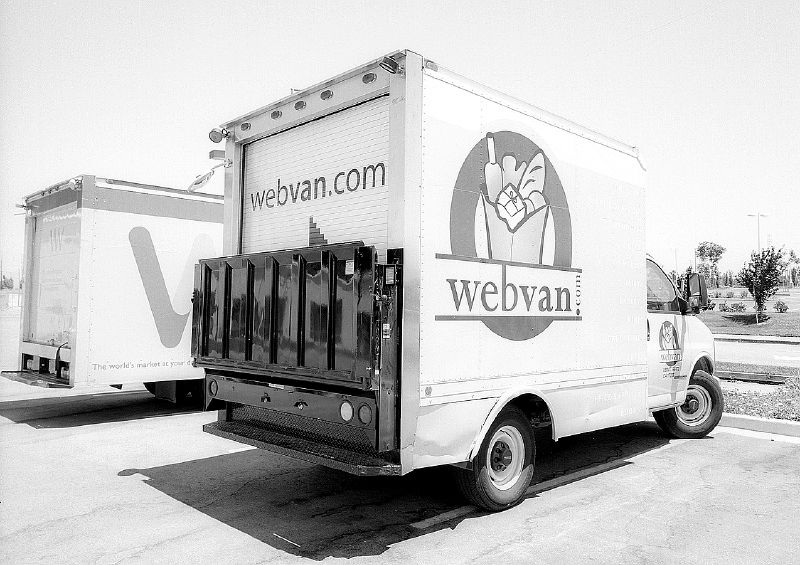
Webvan

Webvan was a dot-com company and grocery business that filed for bankruptcy in 2001 after three years of operation. It was headquartered in Foster City, California, United States. It delivered products to customers' homes within a 30-minute window of their choosing. At its peak, it offered service in ten US areas: the San Francisco Bay Area; Dallas; Sacramento; San Diego; Los Angeles; Orange County, California; Chicago; Seattle; Portland, Oregon; and Atlanta, Georgia. The company had hoped to expand to 26 cities by 2001.

Long after the failure of Webvan, the concept of companies delivering groceries very quickly grew from about 2020, and several companies were vying for business from dark stores and online grocery and food delivery platforms.

== History ==
Webvan logo as seen on an orphaned shipping bin

Webvan was founded in the heyday of the dot-com bubble in 1996 by Louis Borders, who also co-founded Borders in 1971.

=== Growth ===
The company's investors pressured it to grow very fast to obtain first-mover advantage. This rapid growth was cited as one of the reasons for the downfall of the company. Webvan started taking orders in the San Francisco Bay Area in June 1999.

Webvan placed a $1 billion order with Bechtel to build its warehouses, and bought a fleet of delivery trucks. In 2000, Webvan bought HomeGrocer, a competitor that was also losing money, for $1.2 billion in stock. At its peak in 2000, Webvan had $178.5 million in sales but it also had $525.4 million in expenses.

=== Financing ===
Benchmark Capital, Sequoia Capital, and Borders each invested $3.5 million in the company in a Series A round in 1997, buying shares for $9.58 each. Sequoia later invested another $50 million, Softbank Capital later invested $160.3 million, and Goldman Sachs' venture arm invested $50 million. E-Trade and Yahoo! each invested $10 million. In total, venture capitalists invested more than $396 million in Webvan.

The company raised an additional $375 million in an initial public offering in November 1999, during the dot-com bubble that valued the company at more than $4.8 billion. Up to that time, the company had reported cumulative revenue of $395,000 and cumulative net losses of more than $50 million.

=== Management ===
None of Webvan's senior executives or major investors had any management experience in the supermarket industry, including its CEO George Shaheen, who had resigned as head of Andersen Consulting (now Accenture), a management consulting firm, to join the venture. Webvan had a contract to pay Shaheen, who gave up a $4 million per year salary at Andersen, $375,000 per year for life. When the company filed bankruptcy in July 2001, Shaheen was an unsecured creditor. Shaheen resigned in April 2001, while the company was on the verge of shutting down.

=== Bankruptcy ===
The company lost over $800 million and shut down in June 2001, filing for bankruptcy and laying off 2,000 employees. As part of its shutdown process, all non-perishable food was donated to local food banks.

== Reasons for failure ==
Commentators point to several reasons for Webvan's failure:

- Aggressive expansion to many cities without proving its business model in its first market
- A business model targeting price-sensitive mass-market consumers rather than upmarket consumers who would be more profitable
- Building its own warehouses and fulfillment infrastructure from scratch, in contrast to services such as Peapod which survived the dot-com bust and used the infrastructure of existing supermarkets (as did the later Instacart)

CNET named Webvan one of the largest dot-com flops in history.

== Legacy ==
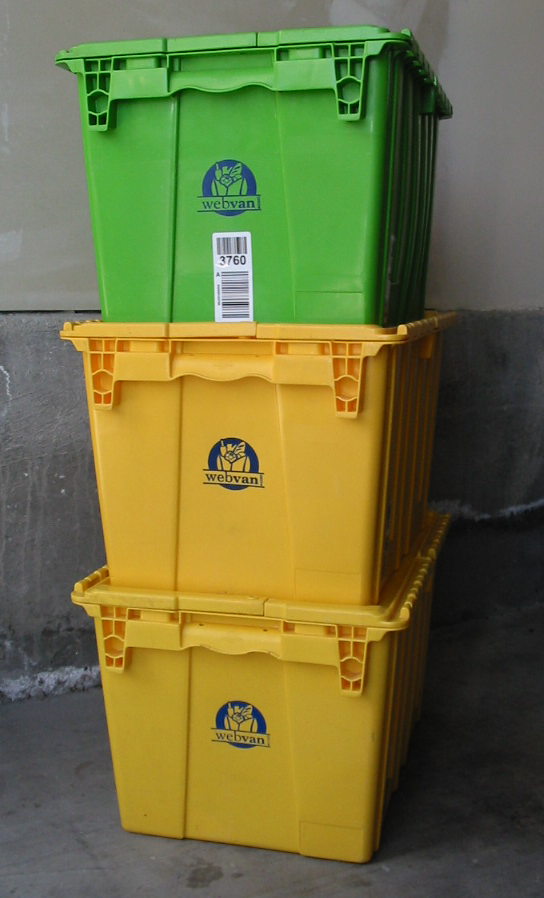
Thousands of webvan tubs survive as household storage bins.

A large number of Webvan's colored plastic shipping tubs are now used for household storage. The company's distinctively shaped vans, now repainted, are still seen.

Some executives of the company went to work for Amazon.com.

From about 2020, especially amid the COVID-19 pandemic, demand for grocery delivery soared. Many companies emerged vying to provide ultrafast grocery delivery, similar to the Webvan concept. These include DoorDash, Instacart, Blue Apron, Amazon, Gopuff, Getir, Buyk, among others.

== See also ==
- HomeGrocer
- Kozmo.com
- Online grocer
- Online food ordering
