= Louis Borders =

American businessman

- Education: University of Michigan; MIT
- Occupation: Businessman
- Known for: Founder of Borders and Webvan

Louis H. Borders is an American entrepreneur. He co-founded the bookstore chain Borders with his brother Tom in 1971 and founded the online grocery delivery service Webvan in 1996.

== Education ==
Borders studied mathematics at the University of Michigan as an undergraduate and later did graduate work at the Massachusetts Institute of Technology.

== Career ==
=== Borders ===
The original Borders bookstore was located in Ann Arbor, Michigan, where it was founded in 1971 by brothers Tom and Louis Borders during their undergraduate and graduate years at the University of Michigan. The Borders brothers' inventory system tailored each store's offerings to its community. Kmart acquired the company for $125 million in 1991. In 2011, the company went bankrupt and closed.

=== Webvan ===
In 1996, he founded the online retailer and grocery company, Webvan. Customers could order their groceries online and have them delivered to their door. The company was valued at $8 billion in only three years, however, the company was defunct by 2001. In 2020, Borders tried to start the company back up, with Webvan 2.0 and raised $30 million in funding.
