= Claire Etaugh =

American psychologist

Claire Etaugh is an American psychologist. She is the former dean of the College of Liberal Arts and Sciences at Bradley University in Peoria, Illinois, and distinguished professor emerita and Caterpillar Professor of Psychology emerita at Bradley University.

== Education and career ==
Etaugh received her bachelor's degree in Psychology from Barnard College in 1962, and her M.A. (1964) and Ph.D. (1966) in developmental psychology from the University of Minnesota.

She has been professor of psychology, co-director of the Child Study Center, dean of the College of Liberal Arts and Sciences, and interim provost and vice president for academic affairs, all at Bradley University. She has served in numerous other positions at Bradley, including associate dean of the College of Liberal Arts and Sciences, director of the Master of Liberal Studies Program, acting associate dean of the graduate school, acting director of the Office for Research and Sponsored Program. She retired in 2017.

== Books ==
Etaugh is the author of books in the fields of developmental psychology and the psychology of women, including:

- The World of Children (with Spencer A. Rathus, Harcourt Brace College Publishers, 1995)
- The Psychology of Women: A Lifespan Perspective (with Judith S. Bridges, Pearson, 2001; 2nd ed., 2003)
- Women's Lives: A Psychological Exploration (with Judith S. Bridges, Pearson, 2006; 4th ed., Routledge, 2017)
