= George Shaheen =

American businessman

- Born: July 11, 1944 (age 82)
- Education: Bradley University
- Occupation: Businessman
- Years active: 1970s-present

George T. Shaheen (born July 11, 1944) is an American businessman. He became chief executive at management consulting firm Andersen Consulting in 1989, and in 1999 became CEO of Webvan. Shaheen was CEO of Siebel Systems from 2005 until 2006.

== Early life and education ==
George Shaheen was born in 1944 and grew up with his twin Gerald in Elmwood, Illinois. Shaheen is an American of Lebanese descent. At age 13 he worked at the family grocery shop in town. He holds a master's degree in finance from Bradley University, graduating in 1967 and going to work at Arthur Andersen.

== Career ==
=== Andersen ===
He was sent by Arthur Andersen in 1977 in South Bend, Indiana and moved in 1986 to Silicon Valley. He became the chief at Andersen's consulting arm in 1989, and "oversaw the move to set up Andersen Consulting as a free-standing unit." He was chief executive at management consulting firm Andersen Consulting from 1989. At Andersen, as CEO "its revenue increased from $1.1 billion to $8.3 billion." He was CEO until 1999, before moving on to online grocer Webvan. The move "shocked colleagues" at Andersen Consulting. After he left Andersen Consulting, it was renamed Accenture, and Shaheen missed out on the windfall of the Accenture initial public offering.

=== Webvan ===
He joined Webvan while it was "one of the largest start-ups during the Dot-com Bubble," with plans to deliver online grocery orders within 30 minutes. His Webvan employment agreement, signed September 19, 1999 was filed with the SEC. Under Shaheen, the company underwent an IPO in November 1999, raising $375 million with stocks soaring, and the company valued at $8.45 billion. Shares afterwards dropped sharply with the dotcom bubble. He resigned as CEO of WebVan in April 2001. His retirement pack included collecting $375,000 each year for the rest of his life from WebVan. Webvan declared Chapter 11 bankruptcy in 2001. When the company filed bankruptcy, Shaheen became an unsecured creditor. In 2010, Business Insider named him one of the 15 Worst CEOs in American History, citing his involvement with Webvan.

=== Siebel Systems ===
Appointed on April 13, 2005, in 2005–2006, Shaheen was CEO of Siebel Systems, Inc. and served as CEO when it merged with Oracle in 2005, five months after his appointment as CEO. He had joined the Siebel Systems board in 1995, and he remained a director after becoming CEO. He did not stay on with Oracle after the merger.

In 2013, he was on the board of [24]7.

== Cultural references ==
George Shaheen was the target of parody cartoon Bigtime Consulting, which parodied Andersen Consulting and had a very similar CEO character named George Unseen.

== Personal life ==
In 1999, he lived in Silicon Valley. He has been married to Darlene Shaheen since 1984.
