= Pacific Equity Partners =

Australian private equity investment company

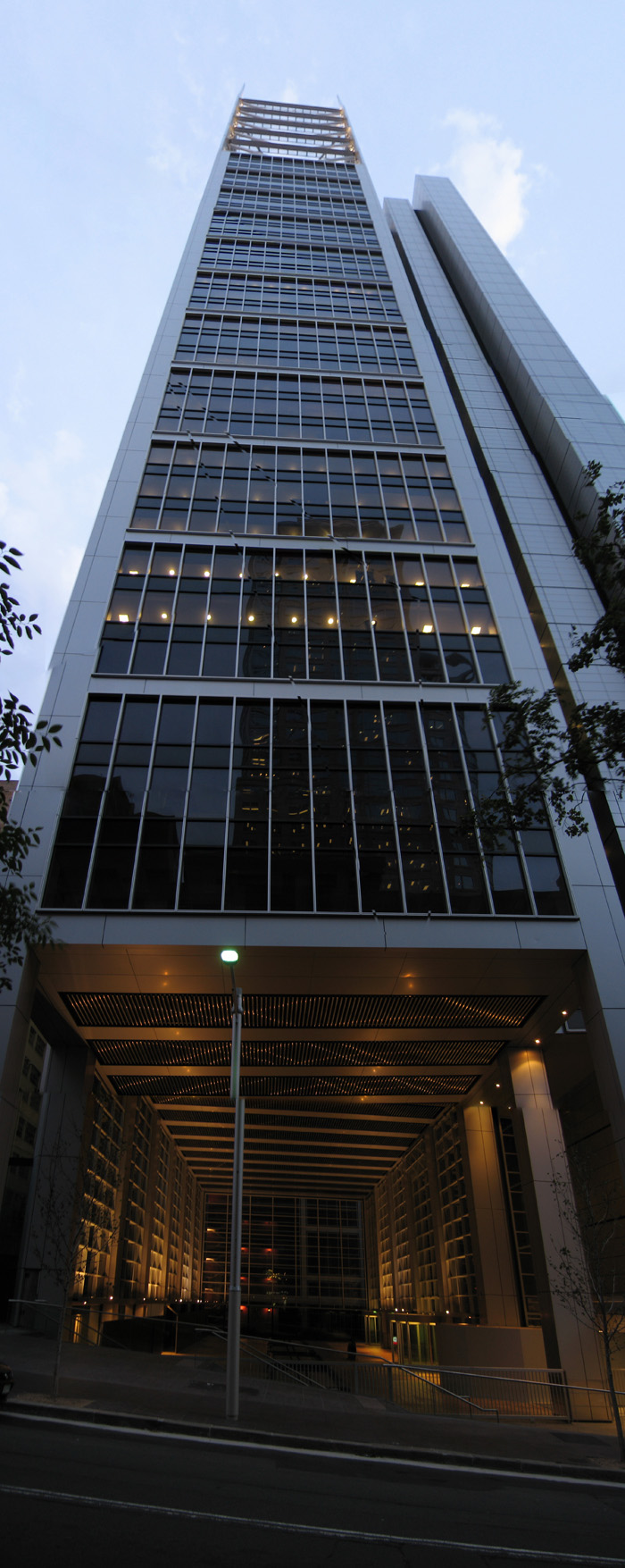
- Headquarters at Deutsche Bank Place, Sydney
- Type: Proprietary limited company
- Industry: Private Equity
- Founded: 1998; 28 years ago
- Founders: Rickard Gardell; Paul McCullagh; Simon Pillar; Tim Sims
- Headquarters: Sydney, Australia
- Products: Private equity funds; Leveraged buyouts
- AUM: A$14 billion (2025)
- Website: www.pep.com.au

Pacific Equity Partners (PEP) is a private equity investment firm focusing on transactions in Australia and New Zealand. PEP invests across a range of industries and sectors, in turnaround and growth capital transactions. In 2023, it was reported as being one of Australia's oldest and largest private equity firms.

The firm, based in Sydney, was founded in 1998 by Rickard Gardell, Paul McCullagh, Simon Pillar and Tim Sims. All but McCullagh previously worked together as executives at Bain & Company.

As of 2025, PEP's several buyout funds had A$14 billion under management, up from $8.8 billion in 2023.

== Investments ==
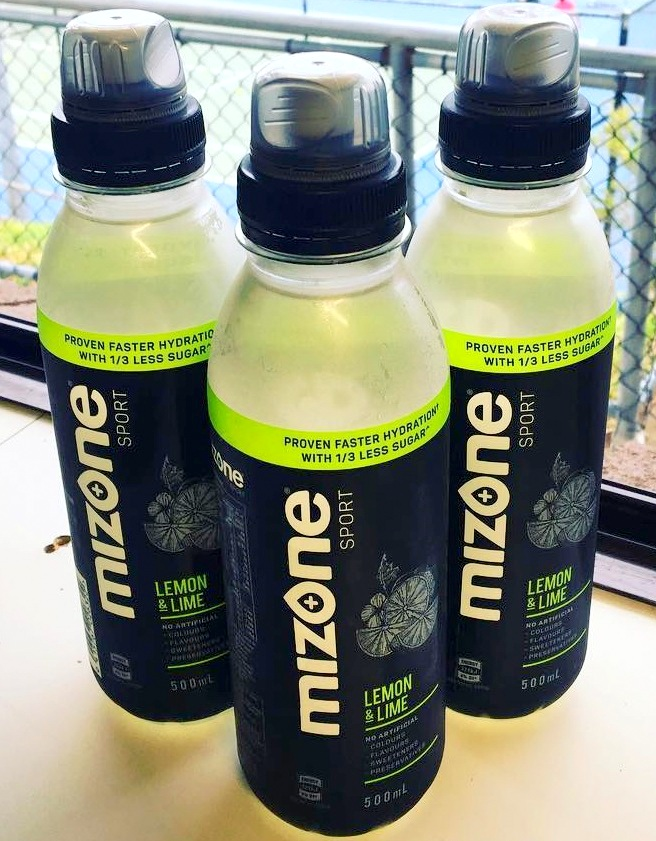
Frucor, who now produce Mizone drinks, was the first investment made by the firm.

Since its establishment in 1998, the firm is understood to have completed 40 private equity buyouts by 2023. Apart from buying and operating large companies, PEP has made 100 "bolt-on" acquisitions in the same 25-year period, these are smaller firms, bought and merged with portfolio companies, for their strategic value.

PEP claims to have "at least doubled" investor monies in 12 of its previous 13 deals, which have included the purchase, restructure and resale of several Australian and New Zealand companies such as Spotless, Hoyts and Frucor. The one business in this set that did not double its value was Patties, being resold at a multiple of 1.7, due to low post-Covid earnings for that food group.

== History ==
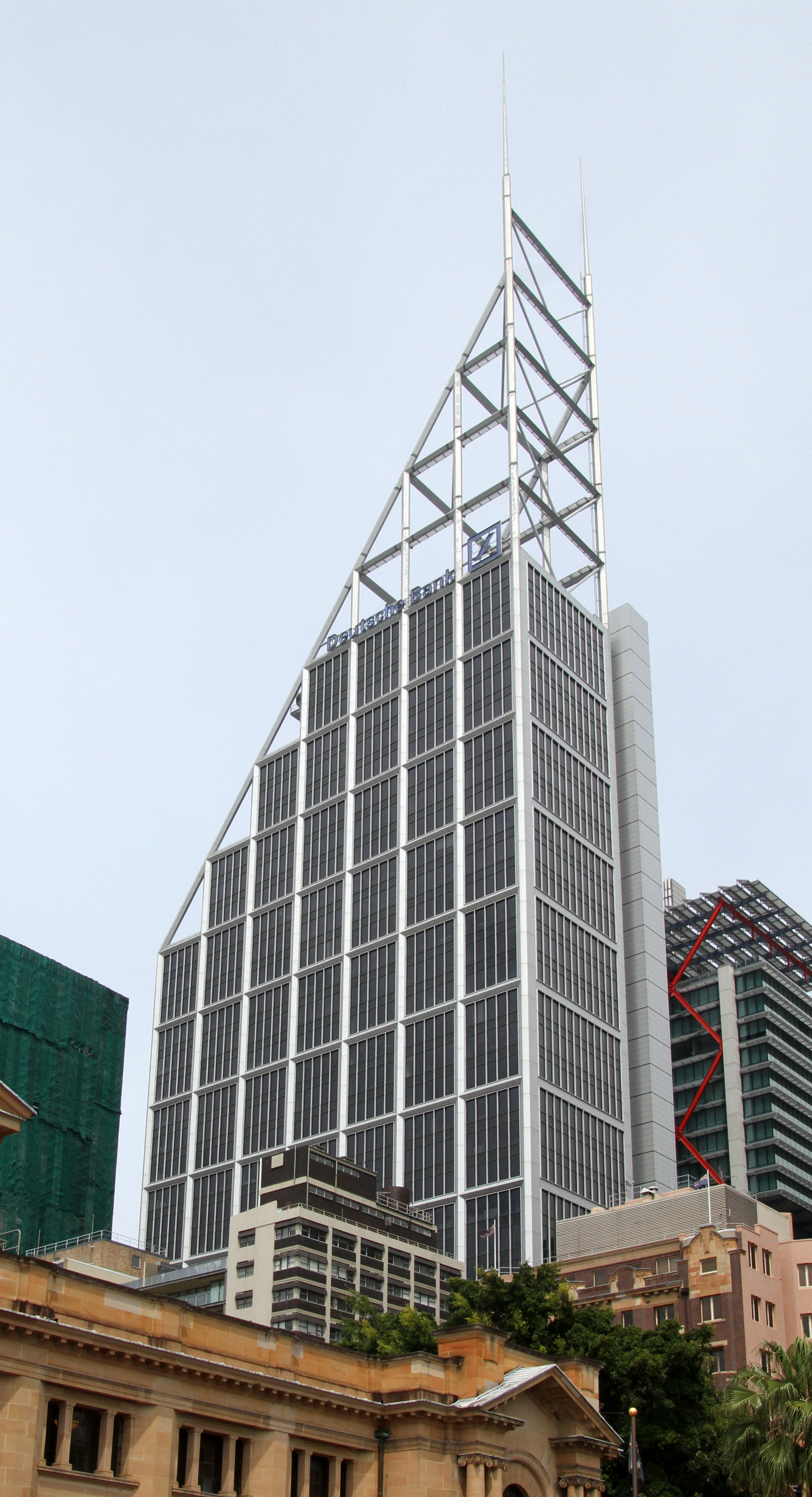
Pacific Equity Partners is based in Deutsche Bank Place, close to Sydney Harbour

Pacific Equity Partners was founded in Sydney, Australia, in 1998. The founders came from the consulting and banking sectors: Rickard Gardell, Tim Sims, Simon Pillar all from Bain & Company; and Paul McCullagh, from Salomon Brothers.

The company's NZ$50 million deal to purchase Frucor was partially funded by Bain Capital and helped by Mitt Romney, who worked for Bain Capital at the time. This became A$300 million for the company's first fund. Pacific Equity Partners sold half of their Frucor stake at an initial public offering, valuing the company at NZ$200 million. The remaining half was sold to Danone at a valuation of NZ$300 million. PEP investors made over 10 times a return on their investment in the deal.

In two early deals with New Zealand–based Frucor (1998) and Vertex plastics (2000–2002), within months following an initial public offering, the companies lowered profit targets and saw share prices initially fall, until recovering after a subsequent takeover. The New Zealand Herald wrote that Vertex "remains a public relations headage for the firm".

The New Zealand Herald in 2007 reported favorable reviews of PEP's management style from leaders of companies that it had taken private, including from Guardian Healthcare, Communications Group, Tegel Foods, and Griffin's Foods. According to them, PEP was focused on long-term revenue growth and profitability for the involved companies, and not on "financial wizardry".

In 2008, PEP Fund IV closed with $2.7 billion in equity capital.

In 2006, PEP and Unitas Capital purchased a majority stake in New Zealand–based Independent Liquors for NZ$1.2 billion on a A$600 million equity investment. PEP had a 43.9% stake. In 2011, Asahi Breweries purchased Independent Liquors for NZ$1.5 billion. PEP made about 1.5 times their initial investment. In 2013, Asahi sued PEP and the other sellers, alleging deceptive conduct that overvalued the sale. The case was settled with a A$199 million payment from PEP, Unitas, and their insurers to Asahi.

In 2011, PEP subsidiary REDgroup Retail collapsed and went into administration, leading to the closure or sale of Angus & Robertson bookstores around Australia.

In 2015, PEP raised PEP Fund V for A$2,100,000,000. It exited in 2023 and earned investors a 100% return. The fund made and realized eight profitable investments in eight years, an unusual feat.

In 2017, co-founder McCullagh left the partnership but remained at the firm as an adviser.

In 2017, PEP took legal action against private equity firm Adamantem Capital, claiming that its founders, former PEP employees, used confidential information at their new company. The legal action was denied and the court ruled that PEP must pay all legal costs.

In 2020, PEP raised A$2.5 billion for PEP Fund VI.

In 2023, the Australian Financial Review reported that PEP created a Gateway fund for high–net worth individuals to be able to invest in a suite of private equity funds from sources including PEP, Bain Capital, and Nordic Capital, and Leonard Green & Partners.

In 2025, the company closed PEP Fund VII for A$3.2 billion. PEP made a bid for Johns Lyng, an insurance repair company, for A$1.1 billion. As of June 2025, the bid was accepted and pending closing.

In April 2026, the company launched a takeover offer for oOh!media, valued at A$750 million.

== Culture ==
According to the Australian Financial Review, Pacific Equity Partners focuses on "apprenticeship" style modeling, hiring only junior staff and training them over time to build a strong internal culture. The investing decisions and compensation are based on a team level to avoid "hero culture".

PEP screens about 120 buyout candidates per year and typically executes two buyout deals per year. PEP focuses on purchasing companies in mature, stable markets with a potential for growth of at least double earnings, with an exit path after five to seven years.

The company's headquarters are in Deutsche Bank Place, Sydney.
