= Sainsbury's Active Kids =

British voucher scheme

- 1 Voucher after collecting £10
- Operator: Sainsbury's
- Collected for: Schools
- Collected by: Spending £10 in Superstores, or £5 in Local stores

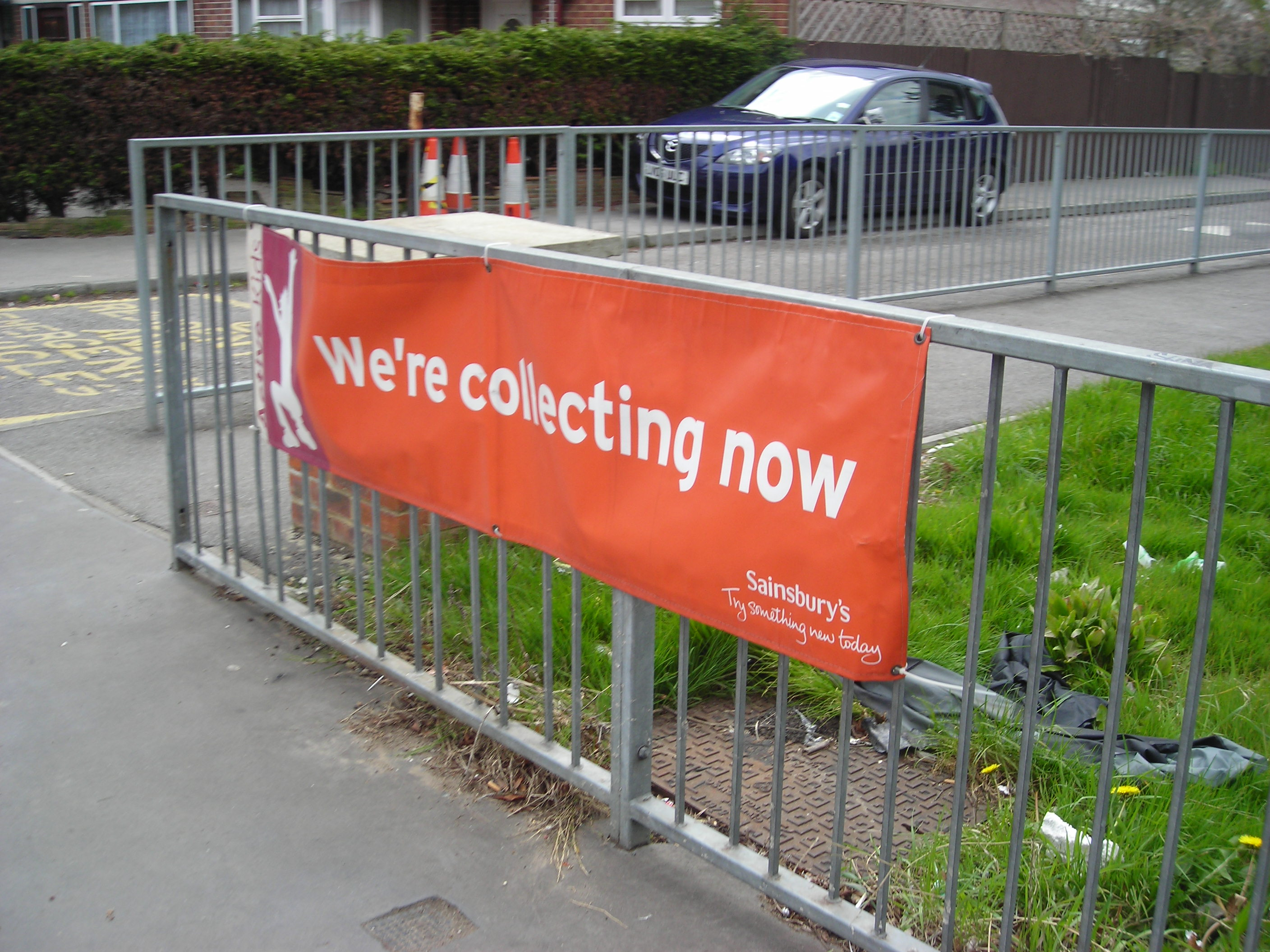
A Sainsbury's Active Kids banner outside a school. Tokens are collected at stores, and are redeemed for sports equipment.

Sainsbury's Active Kids was a voucher scheme run by Sainsbury's. Nurseries, schools, Scout and Guide groups, and Clubmark-accredited sports clubs could redeem vouchers for sports & cooking equipment, alongside active experiences such as dance, martial arts and keeping fit.

Starting in 2005, with the option of collecting vouchers for sports equipment, it expanded over the years to include cooking equipment. Sainsbury's donated over £185 million worth of equipment across the UK.

In 2011, Sainsbury's introduced ambassadors to its Active Kids campaign to help increase participation starting with David Beckham. In 2014, it was announced that from 2015 Beckham would be replaced by footballer Daniel Sturridge.

- David Beckham 2011–2014
- Ellie Simmonds 2011–2017
- Jonnie Peacock 2011–2017
- Daniel Sturridge 2015–2017
- Lucy Bronze 2015–2017
- Jonnie Peacock and Ellie Simmonds 2018-2019

The scheme was run annually, usually between the end of January and the beginning of May.

The voucher scheme ended in 2018 and was replaced with the Active Kids Holiday Clubs, offering daily summer holiday childcare 70 locations across the UK.

The holiday clubs cost £7.50 per day and can be paid for using Nectar loyalty card points, money, or a combination of both.

== See also ==
- Sainsbury's
