= Amr el-Nasharty =

Egyptian businessman

- Occupation: Businessman
- Known for: Sale of Edge to Sainsbury's (1999) and subsequent legal dispute
- Title: Founder and CEO of the Egyptian Distribution Group (Edge)

Amr el-Nasharty is an Egyptian businessman and the founder and chief executive of the Egyptian Distribution Group, known as Edge.

== Sale and repurchase of Edge ==
In 1999, el-Nasharty sold 80% of Edge to U.K. grocer J. Sainsbury plc for £50 million as part of Sainsbury's attempt to diversify into the Middle East. The venture failed after the stores were boycotted over alleged links to Israel and Sainsburys withdrew from Egypt in 2001, selling the business back to el-Nasharty. The parties became embroiled in a bitter legal dispute over the terms of the buy-back that saw Sainsbury CEO Mike Coupe accused of criminal acts by an Egyptian court. In June 2015, Coupe was acquitted of the charges.
