= Sainsbury's Bank =

Bank of the United Kingdom

Sainsbury's Bank plc
- Formerly: Aitken Limited
- Type: Subsidiary
- Founded: 12 November 1996; 29 years ago
- Founder: Bank of Scotland; Sainsbury's
- Headquarters: Edinburgh, Scotland (head office); London, England (registered office)
- Key people: Robert Mulhall (chief executive)
- Products: Financial services
- Parent: Sainsbury's
- Website: sainsburysbank.co.uk

Sainsbury's Bank plc was a British bank wholly owned by Sainsbury's. The bank began trading on 19 February 1997 as a joint venture between Sainsbury's and Bank of Scotland. Sainsbury's took full ownership of the bank in January 2014.

The bank's head office was located in Edinburgh, Scotland, and its registered office in London, England. In 2017 it had over 2.1 million active customers.

In July 2026, the bank was rebranded as Sainsbury's Money and ceased to be a retail bank.

== History ==
Sainsbury's and Bank of Scotland (later a subsidiary of Lloyds Banking Group) formed the bank as a joint venture, and it received a full banking licence from the Bank of England in January 1997. It launched on 19 February 1997.

On 8 May 2013, Sainsbury's announced it would buy the 50% share in the business owned by Lloyds Banking Group. The transfer was completed on 31 January 2014, and Sainsbury's Bank became a wholly owned subsidiary of Sainsbury's.

Sainsbury's Bank branded cash machine, 2020

In January 2024, Sainsbury’s announced its intention to phase out its banking division. In June 2024, it was announced the credit cards, loans and savings accounts were to be acquired by NatWest. The Sainsbury's Bank brand, its cash machines, insurance and travel money businesses were not included. On 16 April 2025 the High Court approved the transfer of accounts to NatWest, which took legal effect on 1 May 2025. Accounts were moved to NatWest's systems by November 2025.

On 30 July 2025, it was announced that the company's Travel Money bureau de change business had been sold to Irish financial services firm Fexco.

On 30 July 2025, it was also announced that the company’s existing home and car insurance business would be transferred to Allianz through its group subsidiary Liverpool Victoria on 30 November 2025 and that Sainsbury’s would withdraw from the market.

Sainsbury's Bank plc was renamed Sainsbury's Financial Services Limited on 24 June 2026. On 1 July 2026, Sainsbury's announced it had ceased to be an authorised bank and rebranded it as Sainsbury's Money, with all services provided by partner companies.

== Services ==
The bank provided a range of financial products including travel money, insurance, credit cards, savings and loans, having withdrawn from the mortgage market in 2019. It was authorised by the Prudential Regulation Authority and regulated by both the Financial Conduct Authority and the Prudential Regulation Authority. Sainsbury's Bank products were linked to the Nectar reward scheme and could be applied for online or by telephone.

== Finances ==
In the 2019-20 financial year, the bank had an income of £323 million, customer deposits of £6.3 billion, and total assets of £9.4 billion.

== See also ==
- Banking in the United Kingdom
- History of banking in the United Kingdom
