= GroceryAid =

- National Grocers Benevolent Fund
- Formation: 1857
- Type: Charitable organisation
- Registration no.: No 1095897 (England & Wales) & SC039255 (Scotland)
- Headquarters: Sandhurst, UK
- Region served: United Kingdom
- Website: https://www.groceryaid.org.uk/

GroceryAid is a registered (1095897) benevolent society for people from all over the United Kingdom who have worked, or are working in the grocery industry, and who find they need extra support to get by. Founded in 1857 the National Grocers Benevolent Fund has been trading under the GroceryAid name since October 2012. The charity over the years has combined with numerous charities, including the London Grocers & Tea Dealers Federation, the Grocers Federation Benevolent Fund and the Grocers Employees National Benevolent Fund. More recently the charity merged with The Confectioners Benevolent Fund in 2012. At this time, the charity ceased to trade under the Caravan name and in the autumn of 2012 became known as GroceryAid. There are seven regional Branches which help to raise funds for the charity across the UK. There are also two Network Awareness Groups in which industry colleagues focus on raising awareness of the charity.

== Welfare ==
People who work, or have worked, in the grocery industry use GroceryAid for financial support and practical assistance. This includes support and guidance on health and wellbeing, personal issues, benefits, career, housing and legal issues.

GroceryAid also has a 24/7 freephone, confidential Helpline available by freephone and via online live chat.

The charity, in September 2015, partnered with Relate, which provides free relationship support.

== People ==
In February 2016, Gillian M. Barker announced that she would retire from GroceryAid later in the year, after 14 years with the charity.

In June 2016, Steve Barnes was announced as Gillian's successor.

Andrew Moore, Chief Merchandising Officer at Asda took over as President of the Fundraising Committee in April 2016. Moore replaced Jason Tarry, Chief Product Officer at Tesco who was President from April 2015 to March 2016.

At the beginning of 2017 GroceryAid unveiled two new Directorial appointments. Jane Hill started as Fundraising Director while Mandi Leonard replaced Cathy Mercer as Welfare Director in the Spring of 2017.

It was announced in May 2017 that Andrew Higginson, Chairman of Wm Morrison plc, would become GroceryAid President replacing Andrew Moore who was a year in the role. In a new move, GroceryAid named a Vice President in Charles Wilson, Chief Executive of Booker Ltd and David Wheeler, Head of Finance and Logistics at J Sainsbury plc was appointed as Treasurer.

Life Patrons: Lord Mark Price, Mike Coupe and Paul Monk.

== Events ==
GroceryAid operates an annual fundraising calendar in the UK.

This includes:

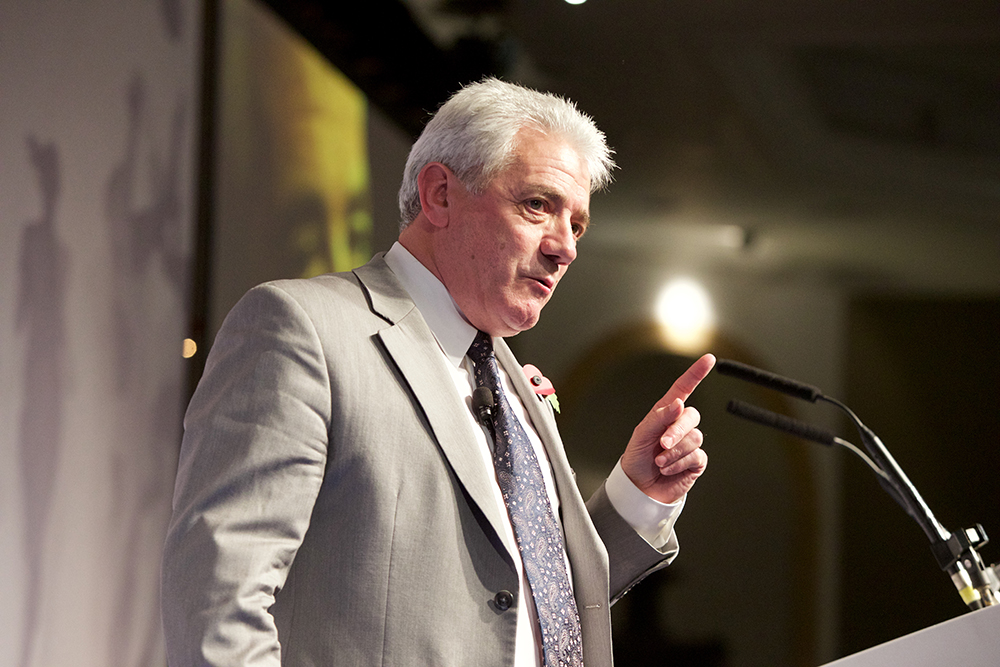
Kevin Keegan speaks at the GroceryAid Sporting Heroes Luncheon, 2016

- The Sporting Lunch, first held in 1965.
- The President's Carol Concert held annually at St Luke's Church in Chelsea, London.
- GroceryAid Ball, which raised over £500k in 2018.
- The Windermere Row, a team-building event set in the Lake District .
- Barcode Festival, new for 2018.
- Challenge events; such as Tough Mudder and a London to Paris ride, finishing at the Eiffel Tower.

In addition to this, GroceryAid have a number of regional branches holding events across the country to raise further funds for the charity.

GroceryAid introduced its Achievement Awards in 2007/8 to recognise companies, large or small, who currently support the charity.
