= Bells Stores =

Former chain of convenience stores in North East England

Bells Stores Limited
- Company type: Private
- Industry: Convenience shops
- Founder: Les Bell (Chairman)
- Headquarters: Holborn, London, UK
- Area served: North East England
- Parent: J Sainsbury plc
- Website: Official website

Bells Stores Ltd was a chain of 54 convenience shops in North East England. It was owned and run by the Bell family until February 2004, when it was acquired by Sainsbury's, the UK's second largest supermarket chain. Shops were initially refurbished to trade as 'Sainsbury's at Bells', but in May 2007 it was announced that the shops would be re-branded Sainsbury's Local by March 2008.

== See also ==
- Jacksons Stores
