= Dino Adriano =

British businessman

- Born: 24 April 1943; London, England
- Died: 9 May 2018 (aged 75)
- Education: Strand School
- Occupation: Businessman
- Children: 2

Dino Baia Adriano (24 April 1943 – 9 May 2018) was a British businessman, and a chief executive of Sainsbury's, as well as being a director of Homebase, Shaws and a trustee of Oxfam. He was noted in financial circles for trying to turn round the fortunes of Sainsbury's after they lost their number one spot to Tesco.

== Early life ==
Born in London in 1943, of Italian descent, he was educated in Highgate College. He attended Strand School, a boys' grammar school in Central London.

== Career ==
=== Sainsbury's ===
Adriano worked at Sainsbury's for 36 years. He joined Sainsbury's in 1964 and worked his way up through the ranks, including moving over their DIY company, Homebase, and to their Shaws subsidiary in 1992 In 1996 he became deputy chief executive of Sainsbury's. In 1997 he became chairman and chief executive of Sainsbury's. He was the first chief executive of the company that was not one of the Sainsbury's family, in a company that still had the family as 40% shareholders He left in January 2000.

=== Homebase ===
He was selected by Gurth Hoyer-Millar to become managing director of Homebase in 1989.

== Back to the Floor appearance ==
In 1999, Adriano agreed to be on the BBC2 television programme Back to the Floor, in which he, as managing director of leading retail companies, went back to the shop floor and worked there for a while with the cameras on him. In the series three episode "Supermarket swap", broadcast on 28 October 1999, Adriano was seen doing the routine things a shop worker had to do; he answered a question from an employee about his six-figure salary, but perhaps his most famous moment was when he decided that because he couldn't be bothered to wait for a price for a product while he worked on the busy checkouts; he just gave the item to the customer.

== Personal life ==
He was married and had two daughters, one of whom worked in Sainsbury's. He died, aged 75, in May 2018. He lived in Surrey.

Business positions
Preceded by Tom Vyner	CEO of Sainsbury's; 1997–2000	Succeeded by Sir Peter Davis
Preceded by	Managing Director of Homebase; 1989–1993	Succeeded by
