= Peter Davis (businessman) =

British businessman (born 1941)

Sir Peter Davis
- Born: 23 December 1941 (age 84); Cheshire, England
- Occupation: Businessman
- Title: CEO of Sainsbury's
- Term: 2000–2004
- Predecessor: Dino Adriano
- Successor: Justin King

Sir Peter John Davis (born 23 December 1941) is a British businessman, who was, from 2000 to 2004, the CEO of J Sainsbury plc, which operates the UK supermarket chain Sainsbury's.

Davis was born in Cheshire on 23 December 1941, the son of John Stephen Davis and Adriaantje de Baat. He was educated at Shrewsbury School. Peter Davis worked for a company called the Ditchburn Organisation, Dock Road, Lytham, Lancashire, U.K. circa 1960/61.

Ditchburns had two sides, one side being Ditchburn Music Maker, which manufactured and sold Juke Boxes and the other side being Ditchburn Vending Machines, which manufactured and sold Hot and Cold drink vending machines. Davis worked for the sales and marketing side of Ditchburn Vending Machines.

Davis worked for Sainsbury from 1976 to 1986 as marketing director and then assistant managing director. Between 1986 and 1994 he was chief executive and chairman of the publishing business Reed International and was involved in the merger with the Dutch scientific publisher Elsevier.

He was chief executive of Prudential plc from 1995 having joined the company as a non-executive director. During this period, the company was condemned by the Treasury for mis-selling more pensions than any other firm. The Securities and Investments Board ordered the firm to retrain its entire sales staff, due to 'continuing and persistent breaches' of the standards of training for the sales force.

Davis was knighted in the 1997 New Year Honours for services to training and to industry. In 1997 he featured in the Prudential's television advertising campaign 'The Man from the Pru', built around the image of Davis as a friendly man advising on his customers' futures. In reality, Prudential staff were required to call him 'Mr Davis' when they met him.

Davis rejoined Sainsbury's on 1 March 2000 as chief executive officer and implemented a £2bn investment in upgrading IT systems, distribution depots and stores. During his term Sainsbury's was demoted to third in the UK grocery market, behind Tesco and Asda. However, in his first two years he raised profits above target and delivered significant cost savings.

With the arrival of Justin King as CEO on 29 March 2004, Davis was promoted to chairman. He was due to step down in July 2005 (the appointment of Sir Ian Prosser, ex-Bass chairman, as his successor was aborted in February 2004), but in June 2004 he was forced to quit in the face of an impending shareholder revolt over his salary and bonuses. Investors were angered by a bonus share award of £2.4m in the face of the supermarket's drop in market share. Davis was succeeded by Philip Hampton.

Davis has also served on the board of Boots. He was previously on the board of Business in the Community (1991–2005), having been chairman from 1996 to December 2001 and served two terms on the Board of the Royal Opera House and was Trustee and Chairman of the Royal Opera House Foundation.

Davis is a senior advisor and a member of the advisory board of Permira, Europe's largest private equity company. He has served as a Trustee of the Princess Royal Trust for Carers. Between 2006 and 2011 he was chairman of the charity Marie Curie Cancer Care.

== Footnotes ==
Business positions
Preceded by Dino Adriano	CEO of Sainsbury's; 2000–2004	Succeeded by Justin King
