= Jacksons Stores =

British convenience store chain

Jacksons Stores Limited
- Type: Private
- Industry: Convenience shops
- Founded: 1891
- Founder: William Jackson
- Defunct: 2008
- Fate: Converted into Sainsbury's at Jacksons then Sainsbury's Local shops
- Headquarters: 40 Derringham Street, Hull
- Area served: Yorkshire and North Midlands
- Key people: Angus Oughtred (Managing director)
- Parent: J Sainsbury plc

Jacksons Stores Ltd, named after the founder William Jackson, was a British chain of 114 convenience shops in Yorkshire and the North Midlands that was founded in 1891 by the Hull-based William Jackson & Sons Ltd and sold to Sainsbury's in 2004, an acquisition which doubled that company's share of the convenience shop market. After the takeover by Sainsbury's, many Jacksons Stores were initially refurbished to trade under the Sainsbury's at Jacksons brand. This brand was phased out and replaced with the Sainsbury's Local brand by March 2008.

Shortly before the Sainsbury's acquisition the chain was voted Britain's best independent retail chain.

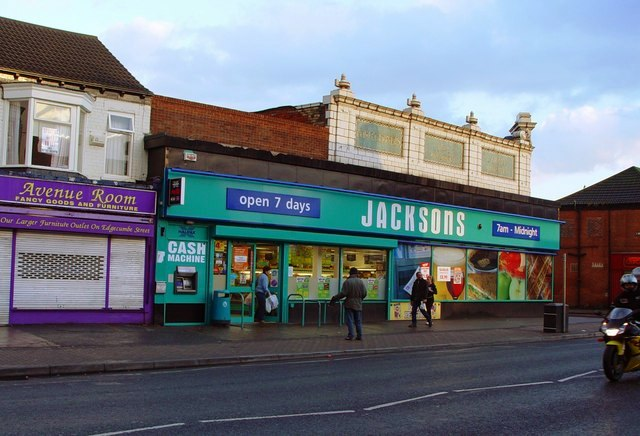
Jackson's, Newland Avenue, Kingston upon Hull (March 2005)

Sainsbury's acquisition of Jacksons Stores was part of a wider strategy to expand into the convenience sector. The deal was not subject to a competition inquiry due to the precedent of Tesco's T&S Stores acquisition; The Office of Fair Trading took the view that the convenience sector was distinct from the supermarket sector.

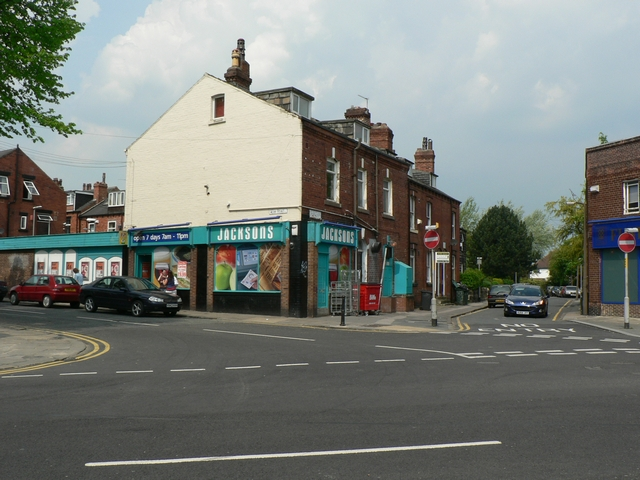
Jacksons, Ash Road, Headingley, Leeds (May 2006)

== See also ==
- Sainsbury's
- Bells Stores
