= Martin Scicluna (businessman) =

British businessman (born 20 November 1950 in Malta)

- Born: Martin Anthony Scicluna; 20 November 1950 (age 75)
- Education: Berkhamsted School; University of Leeds
- Occupation: Businessman
- Title: Chairman of Sainsbury's and RSA Insurance Group

Martin Anthony Scicluna (born 20 November 1950) is a British businessman, and the chairman of Sainsbury's and RSA Insurance Group.

Scicluna was educated at Berkhamsted School and the University of Leeds.

Scicluna worked for Deloitte for 34 years, 26 years as a partner. He was chairman of Deloitte from 1995 to 2007.

Scicluna is divorced and has three children.
