= Mike Coupe =

British businessman (born 1960)

- Born: Michael Andrew Coupe; 26 September 1960 (age 66); Watford, Hertfordshire, England
- Education: The Weald School, Billingshurst; University of Birmingham
- Occupation: Businessman
- Years active: 1983–present
- Title: Former CEO of Sainsbury's
- Term: 2014–2020
- Predecessor: Justin King
- Successor: Simon Roberts
- Spouse: Jill Parkinson (m. 1990)
- Children: 2

Michael Andrew Coupe (born 26 September 1960) is a British businessman who was the CEO of J Sainsbury plc, parent company of the supermarket chain Sainsbury's, from July 2014 until the end of May 2020.

== Early life ==
Coupe was born in Watford, Hertfordshire in 1960. He grew up in West Sussex. Coupe received a bachelor's degree in Physics from the University of Birmingham in 1982.

== Career ==
Coupe began his career at Unilever, where he became assistant brand manager for Flora margarine.

Coupe joined Sainsbury's in 2004. In 2010, he became responsible for the marketing, trading and online operations of the company. In January 2014, Sainsbury's then CEO Justin King announced Coupe as his successor, after stating that he would be leaving the role in June 2014.

Soon after Coupe's appointment, he announced a strategic review that aimed to address the challenges caused by a changing retail market. In 2016 he led the takeover of Home Retail Group which included Argos and Habitat.

In March 2018 he announced new pay arrangements for colleagues.

Coupe oversaw digital transformation and investment at Sainsbury’s, including the introduction of the UK's first till-free stores and the digitisation of the Nectar loyalty card through a new app and website.

In January 2020 it was announced that Coupe would retire from his position at the end of May 2020, to be succeeded by Simon Roberts, the company's head of retail and operations.

In October 2020, Coupe took a three-month appointment as head of COVID-19 infection testing at NHS Test and Trace, an outsourced agency created by the government in response to the COVID-19 pandemic, before being appointed a non-executive director of NHS England from January 2021. In 2022 the Runnymede Trust won a High Court action that the public sector equality duty had not been complied in this appointment, with the trust suggesting that people outside the acquaintance of senior Conservative politicians were not considered.

Additionally in January 2021 it was announced that Coupe had been appointed as chairman of Oak Furniture Land.

In July 2021 Coupe was announced as chairman of Harding Brothers Retail Limited.

== Personal life ==
He married Jill Parkinson in Richmond upon Thames in May 1990, and they have two daughters. In recent years he has lived in the Holgate area of York but he frequently travels between London and Yorkshire. He is a keen guitarist and also enjoys photography and cycling.

Coupe became a life patron for GroceryAid in August 2015. He was previously the fundraising president from 2012 to 2014.

== Controversies ==
In April 2018, Coupe took part in interviews in relation to a forthcoming merger between Sainsbury's and Walmart-owned UK subsidiary Asda. After the first interview, during the transition to the next, his microphone remained switched on and he began singing "We're in the Money". The video was widely shared and critiqued. Coupe later released a statement apologising for his "unfortunate choice of song, from the musical 42nd Street", which he had seen the previous year. Sainsbury's issued a further statement: "We all know these songs stay in your head. To attach any wider meaning to this innocent, personal moment is preposterous."

When the merger failed to get approvals, he accused the Competition and Markets Authority of having "fundamentally moved the goalposts... changed the shape of the ball and chosen a completely different playing field" in its analysis. He said that with "a completely unpredictable set of competition rules, who would invest in this country?", telling BBC Radio 4: "This is just outrageous".

In 2019 he was criticised for reducing the amount traditionally paid towards a Christmas party for Argos colleagues, when he sought to bring it in line with money paid towards the Sainsbury’s Christmas party.

Business positions
Preceded by Justin King	CEO of Sainsbury's; 2014–2020	Succeeded by Simon Roberts
