= Egyptian Distribution Group =

Supermarket chain in Egypt

The Egyptian Distribution Group (a.k.a. Edge) is a supermarket chain in Egypt. It is headquartered in Giza, Egypt's third largest city.

== History ==
The company is chaired by Egyptian businessman Amr el-Nasharty. It was formerly a subsidiary of Sainsbury's, as Sainsbury's acquired 25% in March 2009 and 80% by December 2009. However, they sold their stake back to Nasharty in 2001.
