= Simon Roberts (businessman) =

British businessman (born 1971)

- Born: Simon John Roberts; 26 January 1971 (age 54); Croydon, London, England
- Education: Purley Sixth Form College
- Title: CEO, Sainsbury's
- Term: 2020–present
- Predecessor: Mike Coupe

Simon John Roberts CBE (born 26 January 1971) is a British businessman, and the chief executive officer (CEO) of Sainsbury's since 1 June 2020, having previously been retail operations director. He is a former managing director of Boots UK.

== Early life ==
He was born in Croydon, and brought up in South London, attending Purley Sixth Form College.

== Career ==
He started his career working for Marks & Spencer (M&S) aged 15. He was at M&S for sixteen years, becoming a senior manager in 1998.

=== Boots UK ===
He joined Boots UK in 2003 as regional director of the south region. He was the joint chief operating officer from 2011, with Ken Murphy. He became managing director of Boots UK (health and beauty) on 1 October 2013, with Ken Murphy (from Cork) becoming managing director of Boots International.

Roberts left Boots in June 2016 "to pursue new opportunities".

=== Sainsbury's ===
In September 2016, it was announced that he would be joining Sainsbury's as retail and operations director.

In January 2020, he was appointed CEO effective 1 June 2020, following the impending retirement of Mike Coupe. Roberts also became the CEO of Argos.

== Personal life ==
He works with Business in the Community.

Business positions
Preceded by Alex Gourlay	Managing Director of Boots UK; 2013–2016	Succeeded by Elizabeth Fagan
Preceded by Mike Coupe	CEO of Sainsbury's; 2020–present	Incumbent
