= Justin King (businessman) =

English businessman

Justin King CBE
- Born: Justin Matthew King; 17 May 1961 (age 65); London, England
- Education: Tudor Grange Grammar School
- Alma mater: Solihull Sixth Form College; University of Bath
- Occupation: Businessman
- Years active: 1983–present
- Title: Former CEO of J Sainsbury plc
- Term: 2004–2014
- Predecessor: Sir Peter Davis
- Successor: Mike Coupe

Justin Matthew King CBE (born 17 May 1961) is an English businessman. He was the CEO of J Sainsbury plc, parent company of the supermarket chain Sainsbury's, for ten years before stepping down in July 2014.

King was previously Director of Food at Marks and Spencer and has held senior positions at Asda. King was involved in the introduction of Häagen-Dazs ice cream to the UK and has worked for Pepsi-Cola International and Mars.

== Early life ==
King was born on 17 May 1961 in east London. Raised in Dorridge just outside Solihull, the son of a petrochemical company salesman, he was schooled at Tudor Grange Grammar School (grammar school which became a comprehensive whilst he attended) in Solihull.

King undertook a degree in Business Administration at the University of Bath, graduating in 1983.

In 2009, he was also awarded an Honorary DBA (Doctor of Business Administration) from the University of Bath.

== Career ==
After graduating, King went to work for Mars, becoming production shift manager on Galaxy chocolate.

King joined PepsiCo from 1989, being based in the Middle East, then moved to Grand Metropolitan in 1990, where he helped launch Häagen-Dazs ice-cream in the UK as managing director. He moved to Asda in 1994 and became managing director of the hypermarkets division. King moved to Marks & Spencer in 2001, where he managed the M & S food division.

=== Sainsbury's ===
King joined Sainsbury's on 29 March 2004, and was seen as the company's last chance to win back market share from its rivals and remain independent – the previous CEO, Sir Peter Davis, failed to halt the supermarket's slide in market position despite a £3 billion investment in infrastructure. He was offered £675,000 a year salary. King's annual salary at Sainsbury's was £900,000, coupled with a bonus package between £3-£6million annually.

Shortly after joining Sainsbury's, King authorised the removal of the Colleague Christmas Bonus award. The Guardian reported: "The new chief executive of ailing supermarket chain J Sainsbury ran into his first controversy yesterday as it emerged that he has been awarded free shares worth more than £500,000 in the same week as he has axed the £100 Christmas bonus paid to staff." The removal of the bonus was a contentious issue, given its consistent payment for 25 years and also given that this was the year Sir Peter Davis received disputed bonus payments.

In October 2004, King launched his recovery programme for the company under the banner "Making Sainsbury's Great Again". In January 2008 Sainsbury's announced twelve consecutive quarters of sales growth and achieved its target to grow sales by £2.5 billion, 3 months ahead of schedule.

In September 2005, in an interview with The Guardian King discussed the dominance of principal rival Tesco. While steering clear of calls for a Competition Commission inquiry into the No.1 UK supermarket, King did call for changes in planning laws to prevent Tesco from achieving a 40% market share. As of 2005 Tesco had more potential development projects than that of Sainsbury, Asda and Morrisons combined. King also criticised Tesco CEO Terry Leahy for questioning the accuracy of Taylor Nelson Sofres market data. Leahy has argued that TNS overestimates the size of his company's market share.

He was appointed Commander of the Order of the British Empire (CBE) in the 2011 Birthday Honours for services to the retail industry.

King announced in January 2014 that he would be leaving his post as CEO in July 2014, with the company's Group Commercial Director Mike Coupe being announced as his successor.

=== Manor Racing ===
In March 2015, King was appointed interim chairman of the Manor Marussia F1 Team later Manor Racing.

== Personal life ==
He lives in the village of Harbury, just south of Leamington Spa, Warwickshire. A self-admitted petrol-head, King traded his Maserati Quattroporte for a Lexus LS600h L in March 2008 on environmental grounds.

King is an ambassador for The Scout Association. In 2007, he received an honorary doctorate from Bournemouth University.

In April 2011, King gave half his shares in Sainsbury's to his wife Claire for "financial planning purposes". She divorced him three months later, after 21 years of marriage.

Their son Jordan King is a racing driver, who competed in Formula Three and in Formula 2 until moving to the IndyCar Series for 2018.

Business positions
Preceded by Sir Peter Davis	CEO of Sainsbury's; 2004–2014	Succeeded by Mike Coupe
