= Nectar (loyalty card) =

Loyalty card scheme in the United Kingdom

Nectar 360 Limited
- Formerly: Loyalty Management UK Limited (2001–2011); Aimia Coalition Loyalty UK Limited (2011–2018); Nectar Loyalty Limited (2018–2019)
- Type: Limited company
- Industry: Retail
- Founded: May 30, 2001; 25 years ago
- Headquarters: 33 Holborn, London
- Key people: James Moir (managing director)
- Products: Loyalty scheme
- Owner: J Sainsbury plc (2018–present)
- Website: nectar.com

Nectar is a loyalty card scheme in the United Kingdom run by Nectar 360 Limited, a company owned by Sainsbury's.

Nectar launched in 2002 with initially four partner companies, and by 2010 had grown to include over 14 companies and over 400 online retailers. The scheme was established by Loyalty Management Group, replacing the existing schemes of three of the four launch companies. Participating companies covering sectors such as travel, retail, finance and newspapers.

The scheme is the largest in the United Kingdom, and comprises a number of partner companies, including Sainsbury's, Esso, Carphone Warehouse, Argos and British Airways. Nectar was purchased by the Canadian Groupe Aeroplan (now Aimia) in 2007, and purchased by Sainsbury's in 2018.

== History ==
The Nectar scheme was launched in 2002, merging the existing loyalty programmes of Sainsbury's, BP and Barclaycard; including Debenhams, which did not have an existing scheme. It was run by Loyalty Management Group, then chaired by Sir Keith Mills, the founder of Air Miles. Robert Gierkink, who previously played a key role in the founding and launches of Air Miles Canada and Air Miles Netherlands, was founding CEO. The co-founding senior executive team and management shareholders of Nectar – Loyalty Management UK Ltd. further consisted of five Vice Presidents: Todd Almeida (previously Air Miles Netherlands), Martin Briggs, Peter Buis, Steve Lobb (previously Fly Buys New Zealand ) and Alex Moorhead (previously Air Miles Canada). Additional co-founding management included Koos Berkhout and Jan Pieter Lips, both of whom previously worked for Air Miles Netherlands.

At the time of launch, Nectar confirmed it would be open to more companies to join, excluding rivals of existing members. In December 2007, Loyalty Management Group was purchased by the Canadian Aeroplan, for £368 million. Aeroplan later re-branded itself to Aimia.

By 2010, Nectar claimed that 16.8 million people were part of the scheme, and that it had 14 member companies and over 400 online retailers.

In August 2017, Nectar announced it was partnering with the Daily Mail newspaper. This association upset many customers, who cancelled their accounts and posted photos of their cut-up and melted loyalty cards online. The company responded, "we know that not all of you will support every partner."

On 1 February 2018 J Sainsbury plc announced that it had purchased the Nectar business from Aimia for £60 million.

Sainsbury's began a localised trial with a new Nectar points-earning scheme for stores on the Isle of Wight in April 2018, in which the standard earning rate of one point for each pound spent was replaced by points on specific items plus points based on how frequently and how long a member has been shopping with Sainsbury's.

The trial completed in October 2019, and a redesigned logo and app was launched, with the provision of a digital card on the app to scan, however existing cards continued to function, as long as the original account had not been closed.

== Collection ==
Cardholders receive points on purchases made at participating retailers both instore and online, generally beginning at one point per whole pound spent. Points for fuel at Esso and Sainsbury's are awarded for each litre purchased. Extra points may be earned when buying certain products or during particular promotions. A number of other online retailers award points when purchases are made on their websites accessed through the main Nectar website.

Nectar receives a payment from each retailer for each point paid to a customer, similar to cashback platforms like TopCashback and Quidco. It then reimburses the retailer when the points are redeemed.

== Redemption ==
A number of retailers allow cardholders to redeem points in store for money off their shopping, including Argos and Sainsbury's. Points are typically be redeemed in batches of 500, with each point being worth 0.5p.

Points can also be redeemed with a number of partners through e-vouchers, including Eurostar and Caffè Nero. Points are lost if a Nectar account is closed. For example, an account may be closed if no points have been earned or redeemed for a continuous period of 12 months. As Nectar points do not normally "expire", it is possible for cardholders to save towards more expensive rewards, such as train tickets and holidays.

== Participating companies ==
=== Current ===
- American Express (co-branded credit card, a nectar account and card is still required, as the credit card does not replace a nectar card)
- Argos
- Bloom & Wild
- British Airways (conversion to and from Avios)
- DHL
- Esso (joined 1 June 2019)
- Sainsbury's (launch member)
- The Hut Group (runs a "Nectar Exclusives" webstore – includes a variety of products to redeem points)
- Viking Direct

Points can also be collected for purchases from a number of retailers via the Nectar online store, including:

- Apple
- ASOS
- Currys
- Dell
- Disney Store
- eBay
- F. Hinds
- Furniture Village
- Game
- Next
- Sky
- Virgin Media
- Vodafone (joined 2003, left 2005, rejoined 2009)
- Zavvi
- Waterstones

=== Former ===
- Amazon (removed on 1 February 2013)
- Avanti West Coast (membership ended on 30 April 2022 and replaced with Club Avanti)
- Barclaycard (was a launch member, however membership ended on 31 August 2005)
- Beefeater (membership ended on 31 January 2011)
- BP (was a launch member, however membership ended on 31 May 2019)
- Brewers Fayre (membership ended on 1 February 2011)
- British Gas (left scheme on 30 June 2015)
- Confused.com
- The Daily Mail newspaper
- Debenhams (was a launch member, however membership ended on 15 February 2008)
- Dollond & Aitchison
- eBay (membership ended on 1 September 2024, but points can be collected when shopping with eBay through the Nectar online store)
- Ebookers (membership ended on 1 June 2009)
- EDF Energy (stopped issuing Nectar points as of 31 December 2010)
- Expedia
- Ford
- Gala Bingo (membership ended on 1 June 2010)
- Great Western Railway (membership ended 30 April 2022)
- HMV
- Homebase (membership ended 31 December 2016)
- Hull Trains
- London North Eastern Railway
- Magnet
- South Western Railway (membership ended on 30 April 2021)
- Table Table (left scheme on 31 January 2011)
- TalkTalk (membership ended on 31 August 2009)
- Threshers
- TransPennine Express
- Virgin Trains East Coast
- Virgin Trains West Coast
- Vision Express (removed from 1 January 2015)
- VitalityHealth
- Winemark (Northern Ireland only)

== International schemes ==
Aimia launched Nectar in Italy in 2010, with retailers including Auchan and Unieuro. The Italian scheme ended in February 2016.

A separate scheme is operated by Cencosud in Chile through a licensing agreement with Aimia.

== Security ==
After reports of Nectar points being stolen from cardholders, new spending security measures were introduced, including a spend lock feature. Although Nectar has not confirmed methods which have been used to steal points, it was previously possible to spend points with access to the account number alone. To prevent this, 2-factor authentication (via a code sent to the registered mobile number) is now required when signing in, or redeeming points.

== See also ==
- Tesco Clubcard – Rival supermarket Tesco's loyalty card scheme.
