= Sainsbury's =

British supermarket chain

Coordinates: 51°31′02″N 0°06′30″W

J Sainsbury plc
- Logo used since 1999
- Trade name: Sainsbury's
- Type: Public
- Traded as: LSE: SBRY; FTSE 100 Component
- Industry: Retailing
- Founded: 1869; 157 years ago in Holborn, London, England
- Founder: John James Sainsbury
- Headquarters: London, England
- Area served: United Kingdom
- Key people: Martin Scicluna (chairman); Simon Roberts (CEO)
- Products: Hypermarket/big-box store, supermarket, convenience store, forecourt shop
- Brands: Nectar; Tu; Smart Charging
- Revenue: ▲£33,647 million (2026)
- Operating income: ▲£1,025 million (2026)
- Net income: ▲£393 million (2026)
- Number of employees: c. 140,000 (2026)
- Subsidiaries: Argos; Sainsbury's Money; Sainsbury's Supermarkets Ltd.; Nectar 360 Limited
- Website: Corporate; Consumer

J Sainsbury plc, trading as Sainsbury's, (Note: Pronounced /ˈseɪnzbəriːz/ or /ˈseɪnzbriːz/.) is a British supermarket and the second-largest chain of supermarkets in the United Kingdom.

Founded in 1869 by John James Sainsbury with a shop on Drury Lane in London, the company was the largest UK retailer of groceries for most of the 20th century. In 1995, Tesco became the market leader when it overtook Sainsbury's, which has since been ranked second or third: it was overtaken by Asda from 2003 to 2014, and again for one month in 2019. In 2018, a planned merger with Asda was blocked by the Competition and Markets Authority over concerns of increased prices for consumers.

The holding company, J Sainsbury plc, is split into three divisions: Sainsbury's Supermarkets Ltd (including convenience shops), Sainsbury's Money, and Argos. The group also owns and operates the Habitat furniture retailer, Nectar card, Tu clothing brand and Bush electronics brand. As of 2021, the largest overall shareholder is the sovereign wealth fund of Qatar, the Qatar Investment Authority, which holds around 15% of the company. It is listed on the London Stock Exchange (LSE) and is a constituent of the FTSE 100 Index.

== History ==
=== Origin and growth (1869–1955) ===
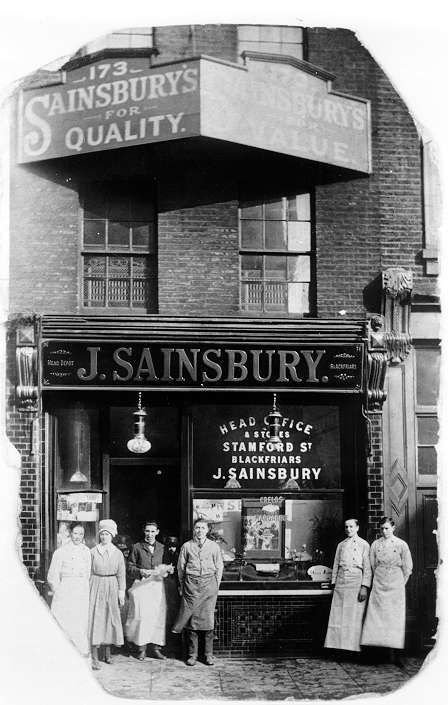
Sainsbury's first shop in Drury Lane c. 1919

Sainsbury's was established as a partnership in 1869, when John James Sainsbury (1844–1928) and his wife Mary Ann (1849–1927) opened a shop at 173 Drury Lane in Covent Garden, London. Sainsbury started as a retailer of fresh foods and later expanded into packaged groceries such as tea and sugar. His trading philosophy, as stated on a sign outside his first shop was: "Quality perfect, prices lower".

Shops started to look similar, so a high cast-iron 'J. SAINSBURY' sign featured on every London shop so that it could be recognised from a distance, and deliveries of supplies were made round-the-back of the shop.

In 1922, J Sainsbury was incorporated as the private company 'J. Sainsbury Limited'.

Groceries were introduced in 1903, when John James purchased a grocer's branch at 12 Kingsland High Street, Dalston. Every shop offered home delivery, as there were fewer cars in those days. Sites were carefully chosen, with a central position in a parade selected in preference to a corner shop. This allowed a larger display of products, which could be kept cooler in summer, which was important as there was no refrigeration.

By the time John James Sainsbury died in 1928, there were more than 128 shops. He was replaced by his eldest son, John Benjamin Sainsbury, who had gone into partnership with his father in 1915.

During the 1930s and 1940s, the company continued to refine its product offerings and maintain its leadership in terms of shop design, convenience, and cleanliness. The company acquired the Midlands-based Thoroughgood chain in 1936.

The founder's grandsons Alan Sainsbury (later Lord Sainsbury) and Sir Robert Sainsbury became joint managing directors in 1938, after their father, John Benjamin Sainsbury, had a minor heart attack. In the Second World War, many of the men who worked for Sainsbury's were called to perform National Service and were replaced by women. The war was a difficult time for Sainsbury's, as most of its shops were trading in the London area and many were bombed or damaged. Turnover fell to half the prewar level. Food was rationed, and one particular shop in East Grinstead was so badly damaged on Friday 9 July 1943 that it had to move to the local church, temporarily, while a new one was built. This shop was not completed until 1951.

=== Self-service and heyday (1956–1991) ===
In 1956, Alan Sainsbury became chairman after the death of his father, John Benjamin Sainsbury. During the 1950s and 1960s, Sainsbury's was a keen early adopter of self-service supermarkets in the United Kingdom. On a trip to the United States, Alan Sainsbury realised the benefits of self-service shops and believed the future of Sainsbury's was self-service supermarkets of 10,000 sq ft (930 m^{2}), with eventually the added bonus of a car park for extra convenience. The first self-service branch opened in Croydon in 1950.

Sainsbury's was a pioneer in the development of own-brand goods; the aim was to offer products that matched the quality of nationally branded goods but at a lower price. It expanded more cautiously than Tesco, shunning acquisitions, and it never offered trading stamps.

Until the company went public on 12 July 1973, as J Sainsbury plc, the company was wholly owned by the Sainsbury family. It was at the time the largest ever flotation on the London Stock Exchange; the company rewarded the smaller bids for shares in order to create as many shareholders as possible. A million shares were set aside for staff, which led to many staff members buying shares that shot up in value. Within one minute the list of applications was closed: £495 million had been offered for £14.5 million available shares. The Sainsbury family at the time retained 85% of the firm's shares.

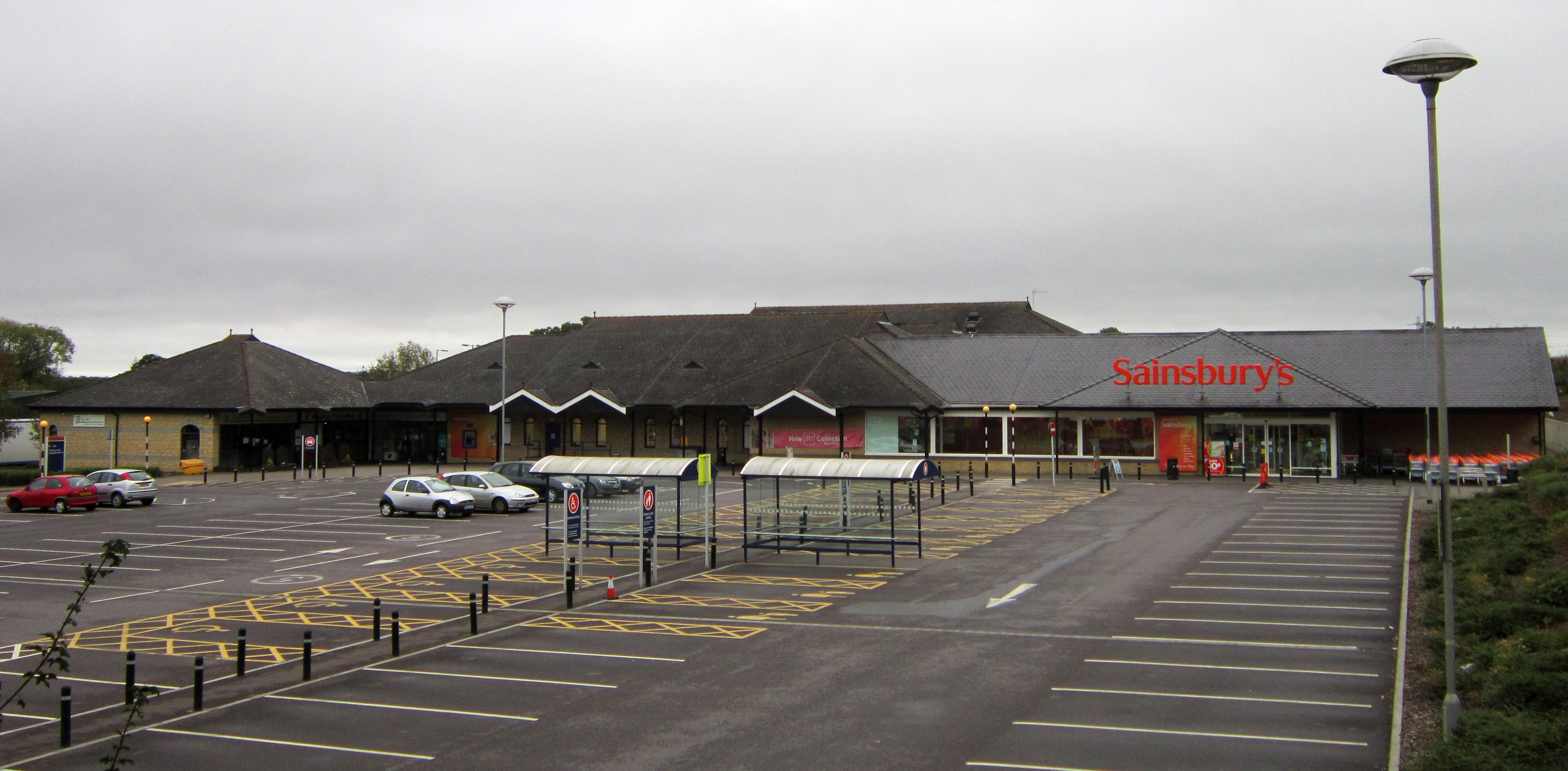
Sainsbury's in Bradford on Avon, Wiltshire

Most of the senior positions were held by family members. John Davan Sainsbury (later Lord Sainsbury of Preston Candover), a member of the fourth generation of the founding family, took over the chairmanship from his uncle Sir Robert Sainsbury in 1969, who had been chairman for two years from 1967 following Alan Sainsbury's retirement.

Sainsbury's started to replace its 10,000 sq ft (930 m^{2}) High Street shops with self-service supermarkets above 20,000 sq ft (1,900 m^{2}), which were either in out of town locations or in regenerated town centres. Sainsbury's policy was to invest in uniform, well designed shops with a strong emphasis on quality; its slogan was "good food costs less at Sainsbury's". During the 1970s, the average size of Sainsbury's shops rose from 10,000 sq ft (930 m^{2}) to around 18,000 sq ft (1,700 m^{2}); the first edge of town shop, with 24,000 sq ft (2,200 m^{2}) of selling space, was opened at Coldhams Lane in Cambridge in 1974. The last counter service branch closed in Peckham in 1982. To participate in the hypermarket sector, Sainsbury's formed a joint venture, known as SavaCentre, with British Home Stores. The first SavaCentre shop was opened in Washington, Tyne and Wear, in 1977; nearly half the space, amounting to some 35,000 sq ft (3,300 m^{2}), was devoted to textiles, electrical goods and hardware. As the hypermarket format became more mainstream, with rivals such as Asda and Tesco launching ever larger shops, it was decided that a separate brand was no longer needed, and the shops were converted to the regular Sainsbury's superstore format in September 1999.

Sainsbury's diversified further in 1979, forming a joint venture with the Belgian retailer, GB-Inno-BM, to set up a chain of do-it-yourself shops under the Homebase name. Sainsbury's also trebled the size of its Homebase do it yourself business during 1996, by merging its business with Texas Homecare, which it acquired in January 1995 from Ladbroke for £290 million. Sainsbury's sold the Homebase chain in December 2000, in a twofold deal worth £969 million. Sales of the stores to Schroder Ventures generated £750 million and sale of 28 development sites, which had been earmarked for future Homebase shops, were sold for £219 million to rival B&Q's parent company, Kingfisher plc. During the 1980s, the company invested in new technology: the proportion of sales passing through EPOS scanning checkouts rose from 1% to 90%.

In November 1983, Sainsbury's purchased 21% of Shaw's Supermarkets, the second largest retailer of groceries in the northeastern United States (primarily in New England). In June 1987, Sainsbury's acquired the rest of the company.

In 1985, the chairman reported that over the preceding 10 years profits had grown from £15 million to more than £168 million, a compound annual rise of 30.4% – after allowing for inflation a real annual growth rate of 17.6%. In 1991, the Sainsbury's group boasted a twelve-year record of dividend increases, of 20% or more and earnings per share had risen by as much for nearly as long. Also in 1991, the company raised £489 million, in new equity to fund the expansion of superstores.

With the advent of out of town shopping complexes during the 1980s, Sainsbury's was one of the many big retail names to open new shops in such complexes – notably with its shop at the Meadowhall Shopping Centre, Sheffield (originally as a SavaCentre) in 1990, and the Merry Hill Shopping Centre at Brierley Hill in the West Midlands, which opened in September 1989.

Sainsbury's expanded into Scotland in 1992 with a shop in Darnley (the SavaCentre at Cameron Toll in Edinburgh had opened in 1984). In June 1995, Sainsbury's announced its intention to move into the Northern Ireland market, until that point dominated by local companies. Between December 1996 and December 1998, the company opened seven shops. Two others at Sprucefield, Lisburn, and Holywood Exchange, Belfast would not open until 2003, due to protracted legal challenges. While Sainsbury's outlets in Northern Ireland were all new developments, Tesco (apart from one Tesco Metro) instead purchased existing chains from Associated British Foods (see Tesco Ireland).

=== Decline (1992–1998) ===
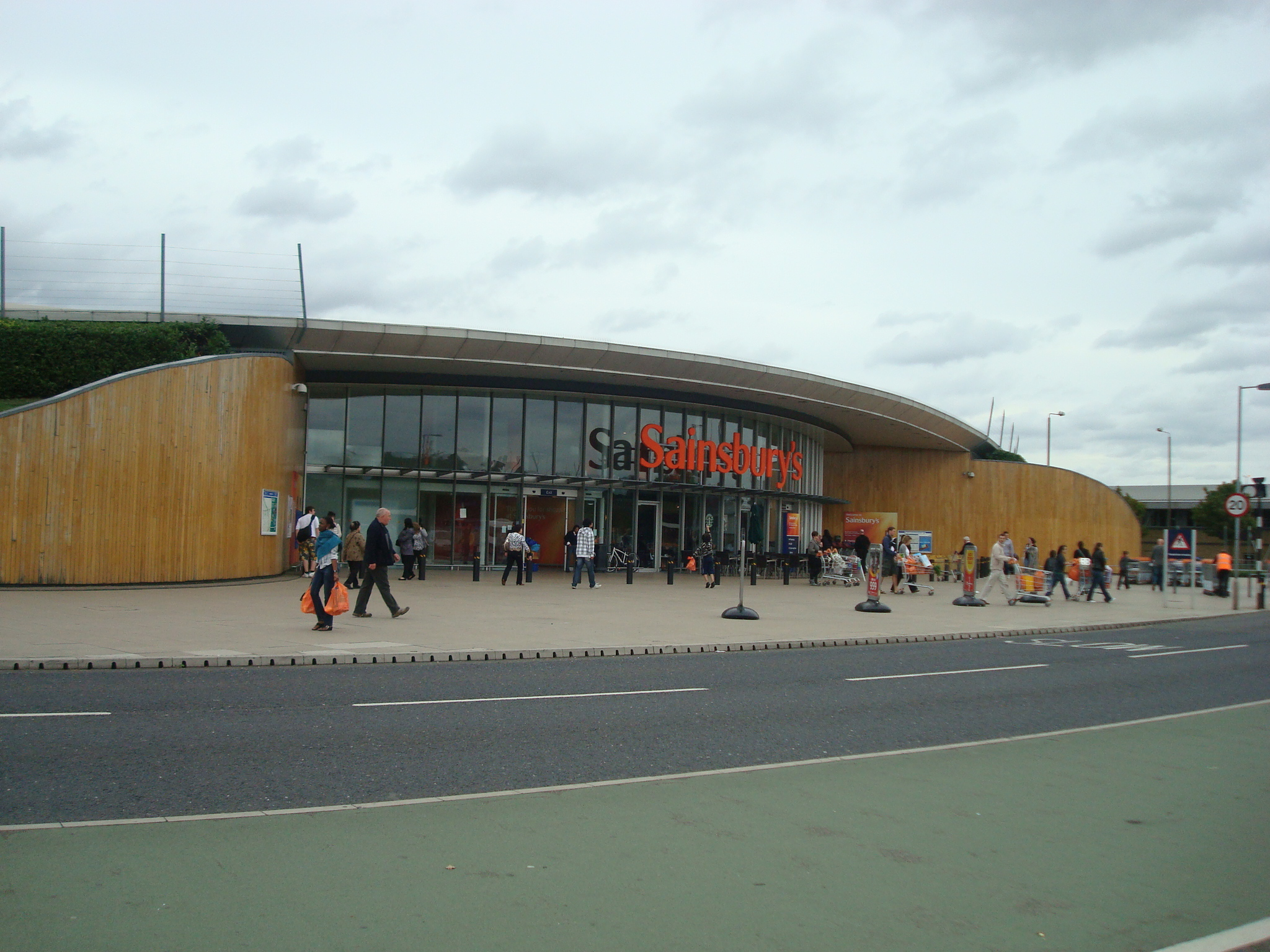
The Sainsbury's supermarket building in Greenwich, which was nominated for the Stirling Prize in 2000 and has since been demolished

In 1992, the long time CEO John Davan Sainsbury retired, and was succeeded as chairman and chief executive by his cousin, David Sainsbury (later Lord Sainsbury of Turville); this brought about a change in management style – David was more consensual and less hierarchical – but not in strategy or in corporate beliefs about the company's place in the market.

Mistakes by David Sainsbury and his successors, Dino Adriano and Peter Davis, included the rejection of loyalty cards, the reluctance to move into non-food retailing, the indecision between whether to go for quality or for value, "the sometimes brutal treatment of suppliers" which led to suppliers favouring Tesco over Sainsbury's, and an unsuccessful advertising campaign fronted by John Cleese.

At the end of 1993, prices were cut on three hundred of the most popular own label lines. Significantly, this came three months after Tesco had launched its line Tesco Value. A few months later, it was announced that margins had fallen, that the construction of new superstores would slow down, and that the value of some Sainsbury's properties would be written down.

In 1994, Sainsbury's Central, a new store format, was introduced. This was a response to Tesco's Metro, already established in five locations. Also in 1994, Sainsbury's lost the takeover battle for William Low (like Tesco, Sainsbury's had long been under-represented in Scotland). Also that year, David Sainsbury dismissed Tesco's clubcard initiative as 'an electronic version of Green Shield Stamps'; the company was soon forced to backtrack, introducing its own Reward Card eighteen months later.

For much of the 20th century, Sainsbury's had been the market leader in the supermarket sector in the United Kingdom, but in 1995, it lost this position to Tesco. Some new ventures were successful, notably the launch of a retail bank, Sainsbury's Bank, in partnership with Bank of Scotland.

In addition to Shaw's, Sainsbury's bought a minority stake in another supermarket group, Giant Food, based in Washington, DC, although this shareholding was subsequently sold when Ahold of the Netherlands made a full bid for the company.

An arrangement in late 1995 with Supermarket Direct made Sainsbury's the first major grocery retailer in the UK to offer a home delivery service.

In May 1996, the company reported its first fall in profits for 22 years. David Sainsbury announced management changes, involving the appointment of two chief executives, one in charge of supermarkets within the United Kingdom (Dino Adriano) and the other responsible for Homebase, and the United States (David Bremner). Finally, in 1998, David Sainsbury himself resigned from the company to pursue a career in politics. He was succeeded as non executive chairman by George Bull, who had been chairman of Diageo, and Adriano was promoted to be group chief executive.

=== Brand relaunch (1999–2003) ===
Sainsbury's logo, introduced in 1999

In June 1999, Sainsbury's unveiled its new corporate identity. This was developed by 20/20 Design and Strategy, and included

- the current company logo,
- new corporate colours of "living orange" and blue,
- Interstate as the company's new general use font, replacing the old all-uppercase font, and
- new slogan "Making life taste better", created by M&C Saatchi, which replaced its old slogan from the 1960s,
- new staff uniforms.

The strapline was dropped in May 2005, and replaced in September of that year by "Try something new today." This new brand statement was created by Abbott Mead Vickers BBDO. While the Interstate font was used almost exclusively for many years, the company introduced another informal font in 2005, which is used in a wide range of advertising and literature.

In 1999, Sainsbury's acquired an 80.1% share of Egyptian Distribution Group SAE, a retailer in Egypt with one hundred shops and 2,000 employees. However, poor profitability led to the sale of this share in April 2001. On 8 October 1999, the CEO Dino Adriano lost control of the core supermarket business within the United Kingdom, instead assuming responsibility for the rest of the group. David Bremner became head of the supermarkets in the United Kingdom. This was "derided" by the city and described as a "fudge". On 14 January 2000 Sainsbury's reversed this decision by announcing the replacement of Adriano by Sir Peter Davis effective from March. Davis was CEO between 2000 and 2004, with his appointment well received by investors and analysts.

In his first two years, he exceeded profit targets, although by 2004 the group had suffered a decline in performance relative to its competitors and was demoted to third in the groceries market within the United Kingdom. Davis also oversaw an almost £3 billion upgrade of shops, distribution and IT equipment, entitled 'Business Transformation Programme', but his successor would later reveal that much of this investment was wasted and he failed in his key goal – improving availability. Part of this investment saw the construction of four fully automated depots, which at £100 million each cost four times more than standard depots.

In 2001, Sainsbury's moved into new headquarters at Holborn, London. Sainsbury's previously occupied Stamford House and twelve other buildings around Southwark. The accounting department remained separate at Streatham. The building was designed by architectural firm Foster and Partners, and had been developed on the former Mirror Group site for Andersen Consulting (now Accenture); Sainsbury's acquired the 25-year lease when Accenture pulled out.

Sainsbury's was a founding member of the Nectar loyalty card scheme, which was launched in September 2002, in conjunction with Debenhams, Barclaycard and BP; Debenhams, Barclaycard and BP have all subsequently left the scheme, although until the chain's demise Nectar points continued to be awarded for online purchases at Debenhams made through the Nectar app. The Nectar scheme replaced the Sainsbury's Reward Card; accrued points were transferred over.

In January 2003, Wm Morrison Supermarkets (trading as Morrisons) made an offer for the Safeway group, prompting a bidding war between the major supermarkets. The Trade and Industry Secretary, Patricia Hewitt, referred the various bids to the Competition Commission, which reported its findings on 26 September. The Commission found that all bids, with the exception of Morrisons, would "operate against the public interest". As part of the approval Morrisons was to dispose of 53 of the combined group's shops.

In May 2004, Sainsbury's announced that it would acquire fourteen of these shops, thirteen Safeway shops and one Morrisons outlet, located primarily in the Midlands and the North of England.

Prior to 2005, Sainsbury's devised a scheme to avoid VAT by treating a 2.5% card transaction fee as exempt from the tax, although the total charged to the customer remained the same. HMRC used a test case against Debenhams to outlaw the practice in 2005.

=== 'Making Sainsbury's Great Again' (2004–2006) ===
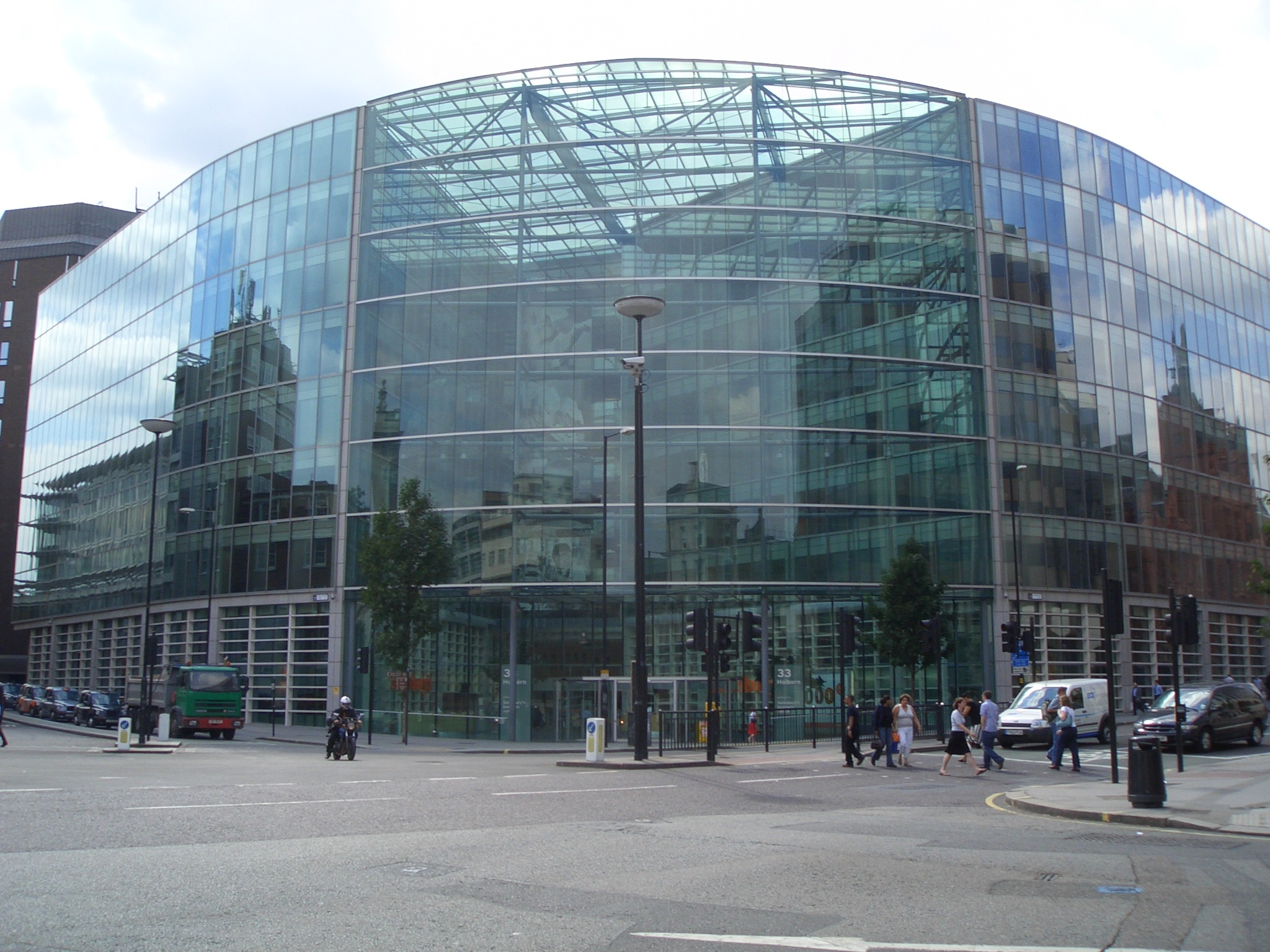
J Sainsbury HQ in Holborn photographed in 2005; the surrounding area has since changed dramatically

At the end of March 2004, Davis was promoted to chairman and was replaced as CEO by Justin King. King joined Sainsbury's from Marks & Spencer where he was a director with responsibility for its food division and Kings Super Markets, Inc. subsidiary in the United States. Schooled in Solihull near Birmingham, and a graduate of the University of Bath, where he took a business administration degree, King was also previously a managing director at Asda with responsibility for hypermarkets.

In June 2004, Davis was forced to quit in the face of an impending shareholder revolt, over his salary and bonuses. Investors were angered by a bonus share award of more than £2 million, despite poor company performance. On 19 July 2004, Davis' replacement Philip Hampton was appointed as chairman.

King ordered a direct mail campaign to one million Sainsbury's customers as part of his six-month business review, asking them what they wanted from the company and where the company could improve. This reaffirmed the commentary of retail analysts: the group was not ensuring that shelves were fully stocked, due to the failure of the IT systems introduced by Peter Davis.

On 19 October 2004, King unveiled the results of the business review and his plans to revive the company's fortunes, in a three-year recovery plan entitled 'Making Sainsbury's Great Again'.

This was generally well received by both the stock market and the media. Immediate plans included laying off more than 750 headquarters staff, and the recruitment of around 3,000 shop floor staff, to improve the quality of service and address the firm's main problem: stock availability. The aim would be to increase sales revenue by £2.5 billion by the financial year ending March 2008. Another significant announcement was the halving of the dividend to increase funds available for price cuts and quality.

King hired Lawrence Christensen as supply chain director in 2004. Previously he was an expert in logistics at Safeway, but left following its takeover by Morrisons. Immediate supply chain improvements included the reactivation of two distribution centres. At the time of the business review on 19 October 2004, referring to the availability problems, Justin King said "Lawrence hadn't seen anything that he hadn't seen before. He just hadn't seen them all in the same place at the same time".

In 2006, Christensen commented on the four automated depots introduced by Davis, saying "not a single day went by without one, if not all of them, breaking down... The systems were flawed. They have to stop for four hours every day for maintenance. But because they were constantly breaking down you would be playing catch up. It was a vicious circle." Christensen said a fundamental mistake was to build four such depots at once, rather than building one which could be thoroughly tested before progressing with the others.

In 2006, anti-poverty charity War on Want investigated the production of cut flowers to supermarkets, and criticised the conditions faced by workers at Sainsbury's Kenyan suppliers.

In 2007, Sainsbury's was fined £26 million for its involvement in a dairy product cartel.

In 2007, Sainsbury's announced a further £12 million investment in its depots to keep pace with sales growth and the removal of the failed automated systems from its depots. In addition, it did a deal with IBM to upgrade its Electronic Point of Sale systems as a result of increased sales.

Sainsbury's sold its subsidiary in America, Shaw's, to Albertsons in March 2004. Also in 2004 Sainsbury's expanded its share of the convenience shop market through acquisitions.

After the launch of King's recovery programme, the company reported nineteen consecutive quarters of sales growth, most recently in October 2009. Early sales increases were credited to solving problems with the company's distribution system. Later sales improvements were put down to price cuts and the company's focus on fresh and healthy food.

=== Takeover bids (2007) ===
On 2 February 2007, after months of speculation about a private equity bid, CVC Capital Partners, Kohlberg Kravis Roberts (KKR) and Blackstone Group announced that they were considering a bid for Sainsbury's. The consortium grew to include Goldman Sachs and Texas Pacific Group. On 6 March 2007, with a formal bid yet to be tabled, the Takeover Panel issued a bid deadline of 13 April.

On 4 April, KKR left the consortium to focus on its bid for Alliance Boots. On 5 April, the consortium submitted an "indicative offer" of 562p a share to the company's board. After discussions between Sir Philip Hampton and the two largest Sainsbury family shareholders Lord Sainsbury of Turville and Lord Sainsbury of Preston Candover the offer was rejected. On 9 April, the indicative offer was raised to 582p a share; however, this too was rejected. This meant the consortium could not satisfy its own preconditions for a bid, most importantly 75% shareholder support; the combined Sainsbury family holding at the time was 18%.

Lord Sainsbury of Turville, who then held 7.75% of Sainsbury's, stated that he could see no reason why the Sainsbury's board would even consider opening its books for due diligence for anything less than 600p per share. Lord Sainsbury of Preston Candover, with just under 3%, was more extreme than his cousin, and refused to sell at any price. He believed any offer at that stage of Sainsbury's recovery was likely to undervalue the business, and with private equity seeking high returns on their investments, saw no reason to sell, given that the current management, led by Justin King, could deliver the extra profit generated for the benefit of existing investors. He claimed the bid 'brought nothing to the business', and that high levels of debt would significantly weaken the company and its competitive position in the long term, which would have an adverse effect on Sainsbury's stakeholders. On 11 April, the CVC-led consortium abandoned its offer, stating that "it became clear the consortium would be unable to make a proposal that would result in a successful offer."

In May 2007, Sainsbury's identified five areas of growth: Growth of non-food ranges; opening of new convenience shops and growth of online home delivery and banking operations; expansion of supermarket space through new shops and development of the company's "largely underdeveloped shop portfolio"; and "active property management".

On 25 April 2007, Delta Two, a Qatari investment company, bought a 14% stake in Sainsbury's causing its share price to rise 7.17%, and then increased its holding to 17.6%. Its interest in Sainsbury's is thought to centre on its property portfolio. It increased its stake to 25% in June 2007. On 18 July 2007, BBC News reported that Delta Two had tabled a conditional bid proposal. Paul Taylor, the principal of Delta Two, flew David and John Sainsbury to Sardinia to reveal and discuss the potential bid which amounted to 600p per share.

The family had reservations about the price of the bid. They were also concerned about the proposed structure, which involved splitting the business into an operating company and a highly leveraged property company. They were additionally concerned about adequacy of funding, both for the bid and for the company's pension scheme. On 5 November 2007, it was announced Delta Two had abandoned its takeover bid due to the "deterioration of credit markets" and concerns about funding the company's pension scheme.

=== Administrative changes ===
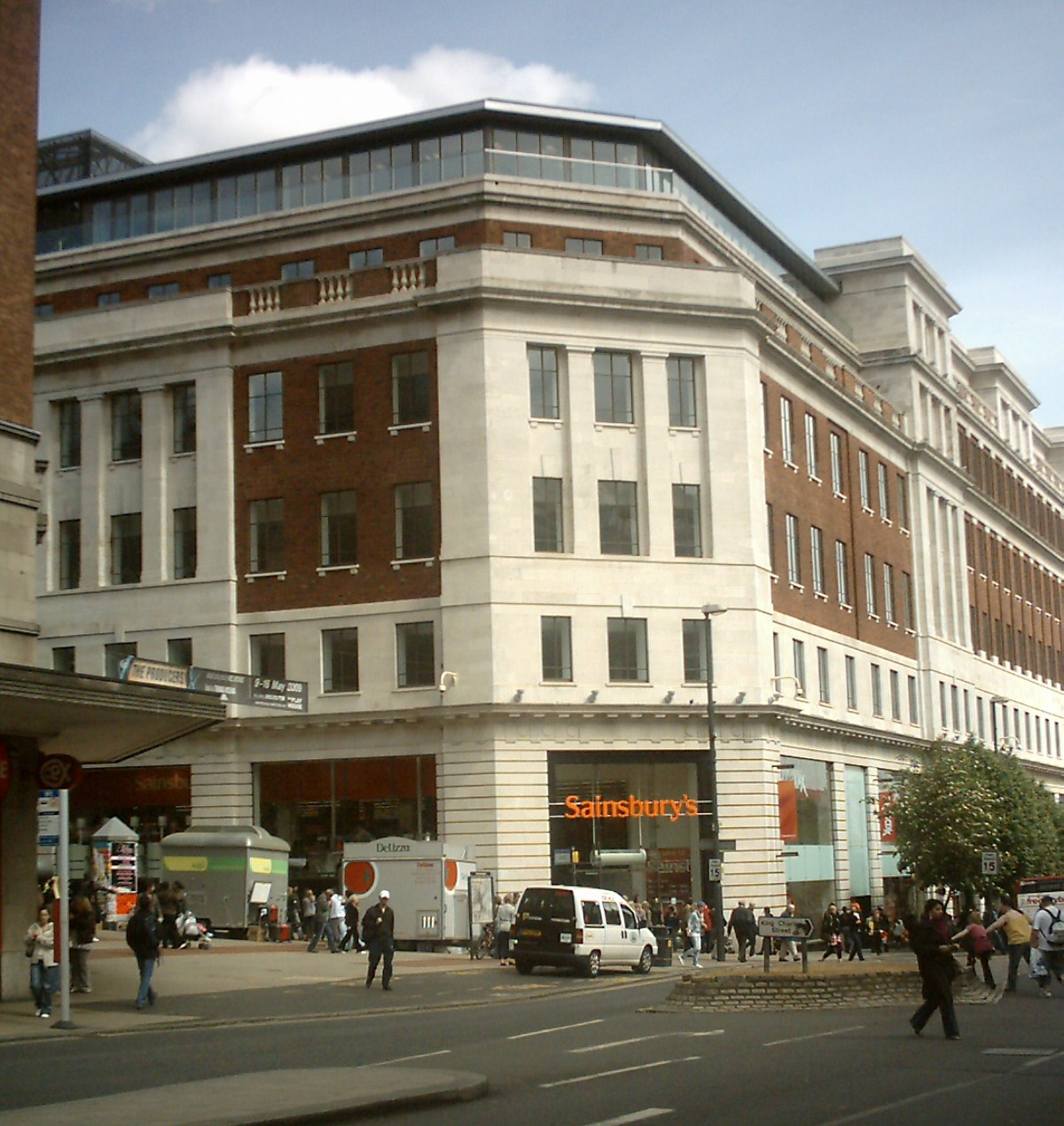
Sainsbury's in the former Allders branch on The Headrow in Leeds city centre

In January 2008, Sainsbury's brought the number of its supermarkets in Northern Ireland to eleven, with the purchase of two Curley's Supermarkets in Dungannon and Belfast.

In November 2007, Sainsbury's centralised its HR department, relocating to the 17th and 18th floors of the Manchester Arndale Centre to form a Shared Service Centre, which was initially trialled to deal with Recruitment in Scotland and was later rolled out to the whole of the United Kingdom. July 2009 saw the HR Shared Service Centre in Manchester expand to include most HR Processes in its Colleague Administration Department and Occupational Health enquiries in a dedicated unit.

Since April 2012, the centre has begun a gradual relocation to its new offices in the centre of Lincoln, along with a rebrand as Sainsbury's HR Services.

=== Developing business (2009–2016) ===
In March 2009, Sainsbury's reached an agreement to buy 24 shops from The Co-operative Group, 22 of which were Somerfield shops, which the group was required to sell as a condition of its takeover of Somerfield. A further nine shops were purchased from The Co-operative Group in June 2009. These were concentrated in West Wales, the North of England and Scotland, where Sainsbury's market share is low.

In May 2010, Sainsbury's confirmed a multimillion-pound deal with the London Organising Committee of the Olympic and Paralympic Games (LOCOG) to be the main sponsor of the 2012 Paralympic Games. Under the deal, Sainsbury's sold Paralympic merchandise and became involved in high-profile events, such as the torch relay. It became one of only two sponsors able to take advantage of the limited branding allowed within the Games. The promotional rights did not extend to the Olympics. After the Paralympic Games, the company decided to sponsor the British Paralympic Association through to Rio 2016.

On 30 November 2011, Sainsbury's reached the first milestone in its Vision for 2020, by opening its thousandth self-service shop in Irvine, Scotland. To celebrate this, Sainsbury's doubled its staff discount to 20% for the first four days of December. In January 2014, Sainsbury's completed the purchase of the 50% share in Sainsbury's Bank, owned by Lloyds Banking Group.

In July 2014, the company began powering one of its shops by converting food waste into bio methane gas to generate electricity. The group became the first retailer to come off the National Grid by its own means. In July 2016, Arcus FM extended its facilities management contract with Sainsbury's, securing a ten-year renewal. Arcus won the initial contract in 2009, and saw the contract extended in 2011.

=== Multi-channel retailer and restructuring (2016–2026) ===
After a four-month pursuit, in April 2016 Home Retail Group agreed to be taken over by Sainsbury's for £1.4 billion. Sainsbury's completed the acquisition in September 2016. The deal included catalogue chain Argos and furnishing retailer Habitat. As a result, the new Sainsbury's group was organised into four divisions: the core Sainsbury's food retail business; General Merchandising (including Argos) & TU Clothing; Financial Services (Sainsbury's Bank and Argos financial services businesses); and various property investments.

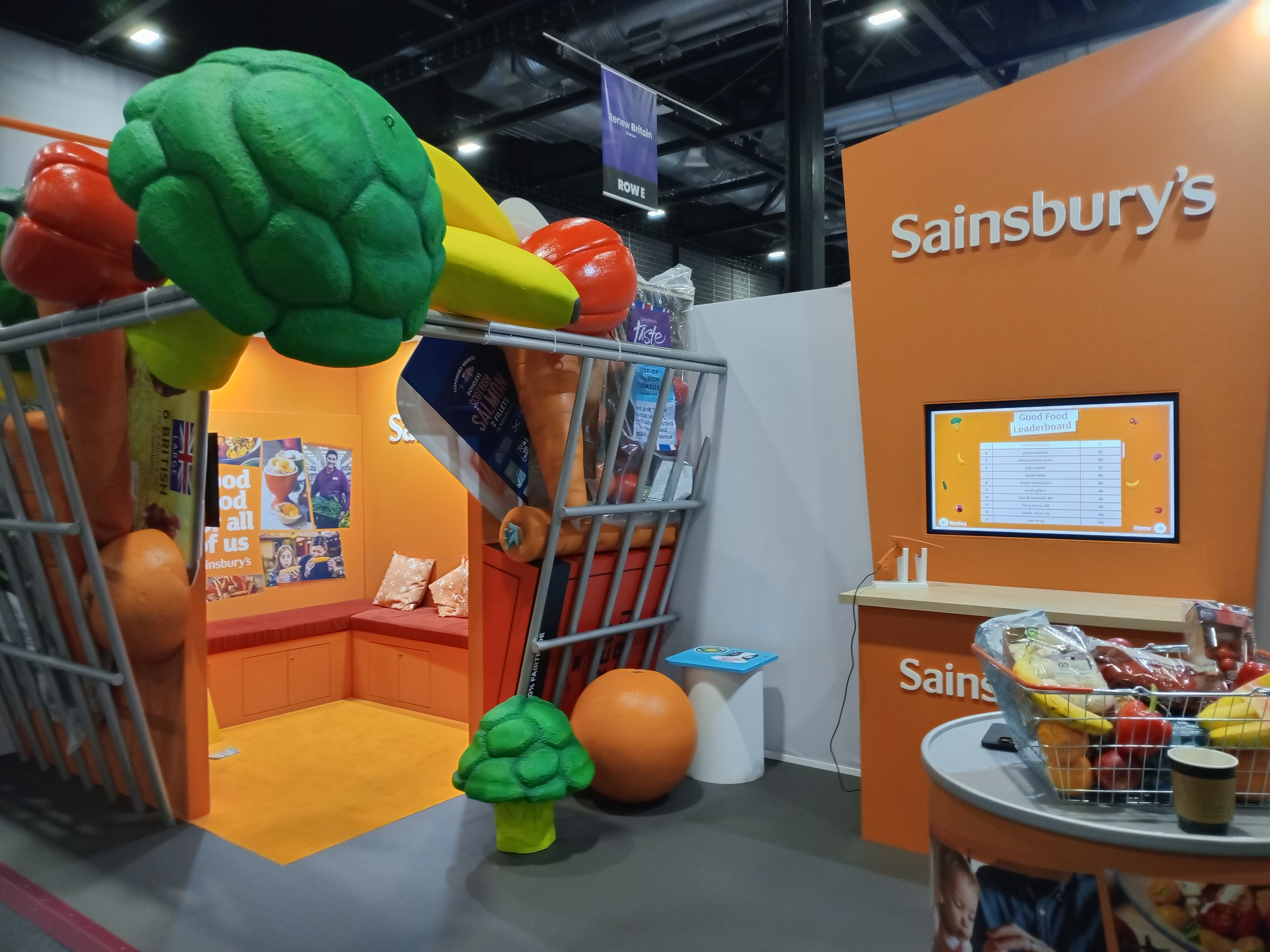
Sainsburys stall at Labour Party Conference 2025

Throughout 2016 and 2017 Sainsbury's pursued expansion of its multi-channel strategy, increasing the number of groceries Click and Collect points and online fulfilment locations to serve its online delivery network including opening a dark store in Bromley by Bow to serve the London area, increasing geographical coverage of its same-day groceries delivery network and integrating concessions into its shops such as Argos, Habitat, Timpson's and Starbucks.

In November 2016, Sainsbury's announced its intention to cut £500 million of costs from its business. In March 2017 400 jobs were cut and 4,000 jobs were re-organized, mainly affecting employees in night shift and commercial operation (cash office and price control) roles.

In May 2017, the supermarket was criticised by organisations including Oxfam for dropping its Fairtrade label from tea. They queried how Sainsbury's own standards would be higher than those of Divine Chocolate, an ethical trading company part-owned by cocoa farmers in Ghana, said Sainsbury's move was tipping the balance back in favour of retailers.

In August 2017, 1000 jobs were cut throughout all of its Head Office and support centres, affecting a variety of functions.

In October 2017, changes to security contracts meant that provider Mitie reduced the number of security officers within shops. In the same month Sainsbury's announced plans to axe all shop-based Human Resource employees, including HR managers, payroll clerks, administration clerks and Learning and Development managers, overall affecting 1400 jobs. Additionally another 600 jobs at its Head Offices were cut.

In January 2018, Sainsbury's announced proposals to overhaul shop management structures which would result in job losses 'in the thousands'.

On 1 February 2018, Sainsbury's announced the purchase of Nectar from AIMIA for £60 million; this gave full control of all Nectar data to Sainsbury's.

In March 2018, Sainsbury's announced that it would be increasing the base rate of pay for its staff to retain the best workers. It said it would increase pay by 15% in the year, spending an extra £100 million on a plan that would also simplify the number of job roles.

In April 2018, Sainsbury's entered talks with Walmart about a proposed merger with Asda, which, if approved, could have formed the largest UK supermarket company. Under the proposal, Walmart would have owned 42% of the group, with day-to-day operations being led by the chief executive of Sainsbury's at the time, Mike Coupe. The group also outlined plans to open branches of Argos within Asda shops. However, the Competition and Markets Authority (the UK's regulator on anti-competitive practices) said in February 2019 that it could block the merger. On 25 April 2019, the Competition and Markets Authority blocked the merger and it was abandoned by Sainsbury's.

In November 2020, Sainsbury's stated that up to 3,500 jobs were at risk due to the closure of supermarket counters and the closure of further Argos standalone stores. In March 2021, the group announced further restructuring with the loss of 1150 head office and warehousing roles. Office sites Victoria and Saffron House in London, as well as Walsgrave in Coventry, were closed; office space was reduced at other sites at Milton Keynes, Coventry, London and Manchester. The restructure also included the closure of the company's only online fulfilment centre in Bromley-by-Bow, London; with online orders instead being fulfilled by nearby stores with online fulfilment capabilities The group reported a £261 million loss in April 2021, citing £485 million of investment in 'additional safety measures' in response to the Coronavirus pandemic, additional staffing costs and additional staff bonuses. The group's financial results included the one-off costs of announced restructuring as well as writedowns of its estate valuations and banking assets. The group's new CEO Simon Roberts has started to focus the grocery business on a 'food first strategy'; the company's slogan changed in May 2021 and an advertising campaign followed promoting healthier eating choices and sustainable food, designed to complement the company's partnership of the 2021 UN Climate Change Conference being held in the UK.

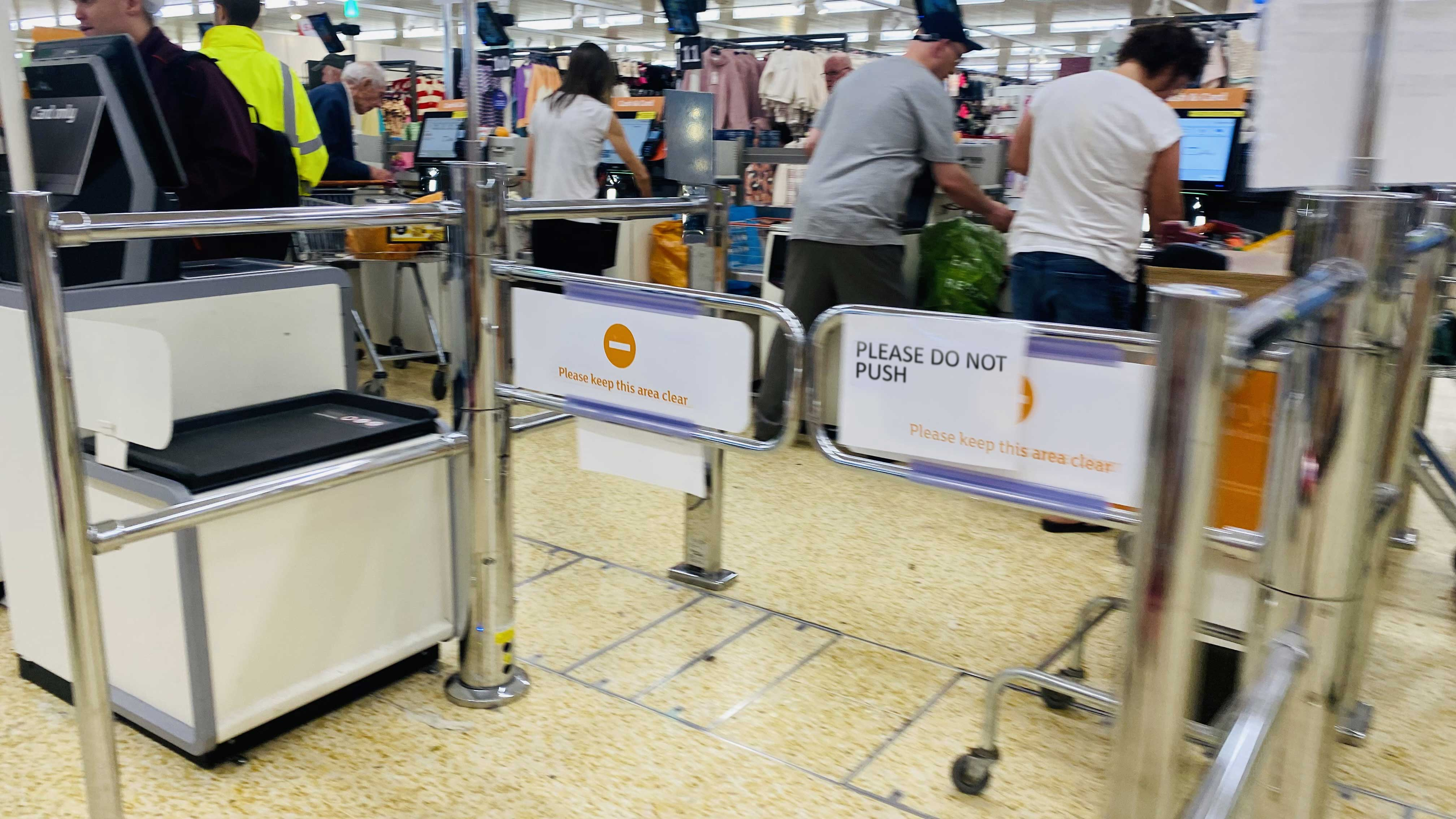
Customers in some Sainsbury's stores are held in a barriered area until they scan their receipt.

In 2022 Sainsbury's began to introduce new security arrangements in some stores to reduce shoplifting. Customers are held within a barriered area and must scan their printed receipt on an optical scanner to open an automatic gate, before they are permitted to exit the store. The change has been criticised in the media for inconveniencing customers and presuming all customers to be potentially guilty of theft until they are able to prove their innocence. Sainsbury's stated that the new system was necessary following a 22% increase in shoplifting as a result of the cost-of-living crisis.

On 31 October 2024, Sainsbury's announced the sale of its Argos Financial Services cards portfolio to NewDay Group for £720 million ($934 million) as part of its plan to concentrate on its main retail operations.

On 13 September 2025, Sainsbury's were in talks to sell Argos to JD.com, but walked away from the deal a day later.

=== Focus on food (2026–present) ===
On 26 January 2026, Sainsbury's moved from its head office at 33 Holborn after agreeing an early termination to their lease and moved to 33 Charterhouse Street, Farringdon, London.

In July 2026, Sainsbury's CEO described food as a 'matter of national security'. He argued that food should be treated as a sector in a similar way to energy or automation, and pledged the chain's support to proposed legislation aiming to strengthen the resilience of the UK food system.

On 31 July 2026, Sainsbury's announced it would sell Argos to newly-created firm Swift Partners for £120m to focus more on its food businesses. Sainsbury's along with the new owners of Argos intend to retain an in-store presence with Sainsbury's supermarkets and to continue using the Nectar loyalty programme. Sainsbury's will continue to sell Argos-branded products such as Habitat. The deal is expected to complete in February 2027. Richard Pennycook would serve as chairman and head up the nearly 14,000 of existing Argos staff, who would be transferred to Swift Partners upon completion, as part of the purchase.

On 15 October 2026, Sainsbury's announced it had reached an agreement to sell its forecourts in Northern Ireland to Cookstown-based LCC Group, where the forecourts would be rebranded under LCC's Go brand.

== Leaders ==
Year	Managing Directors
1896–1928	John James Sainsbury
1928–1938	John Benjamin Sainsbury
1938–1956	Alan Sainsbury (later Lord Sainsbury) and Robert Sainsbury (later Sir Robert Sainsbury) (Joint managing directors)
1956–1969	Robert Sainsbury (later Sir Robert Sainsbury)
Year	Chief Executive Officers
1969–1992	John Davan Sainsbury (later Lord Sainsbury of Preston Candover)
1992–1996	David Sainsbury (later Lord Sainsbury of Turville)
1996–1998	Dino Adriano (United Kingdom Operations) and David Bremner (United States Operations and Homebase) (Joint chief executive officers)
1998–2000	Dino Adriano
2000–2004	Sir Peter Davis
2004–2014	Justin King
2014–2020	Mike Coupe
2020–Present	Simon Roberts

Year	Chairs
1956–1967	Alan Sainsbury (later Lord Sainsbury)
1967–1969	Robert Sainsbury (later Sir Robert Sainsbury)
1969–1992	John Davan Sainsbury (later Lord Sainsbury of Preston Candover)
1992–1998	David Sainsbury (later Lord Sainsbury of Turville)
1998–2004	George Bull
2004–2004	Sir Peter Davis
2004–2009	Philip Hampton
2009–2019	David Tyler
2019–present	Martin Scicluna

== Shops ==
In March 2019, Sainsbury's shop portfolio was as follows:

Format	Number	Total area		Mean area		Percentage of space
Format	Number	(m^{2})	(sq ft)	(m^{2})	(sq ft)	Percentage of space
Supermarkets	608	1,971,000	21,210,000	3,240	34,885	92%
Convenience shops	820	179,675	1,934,000	219	2,360	8%
Total	1,428	2,150,000	23,144,000	-	-	100%

It is particularly strong in London and the South-East, where it is based, and has powerful positions within many UK cities. The company acquired the Midlands-based firm Thoroughgood in the 1930s. Expansion since 1945 has given the company national reach, although the chain is not as well-represented in Scotland as Tesco, Asda and Morrisons.

=== Supermarkets ===
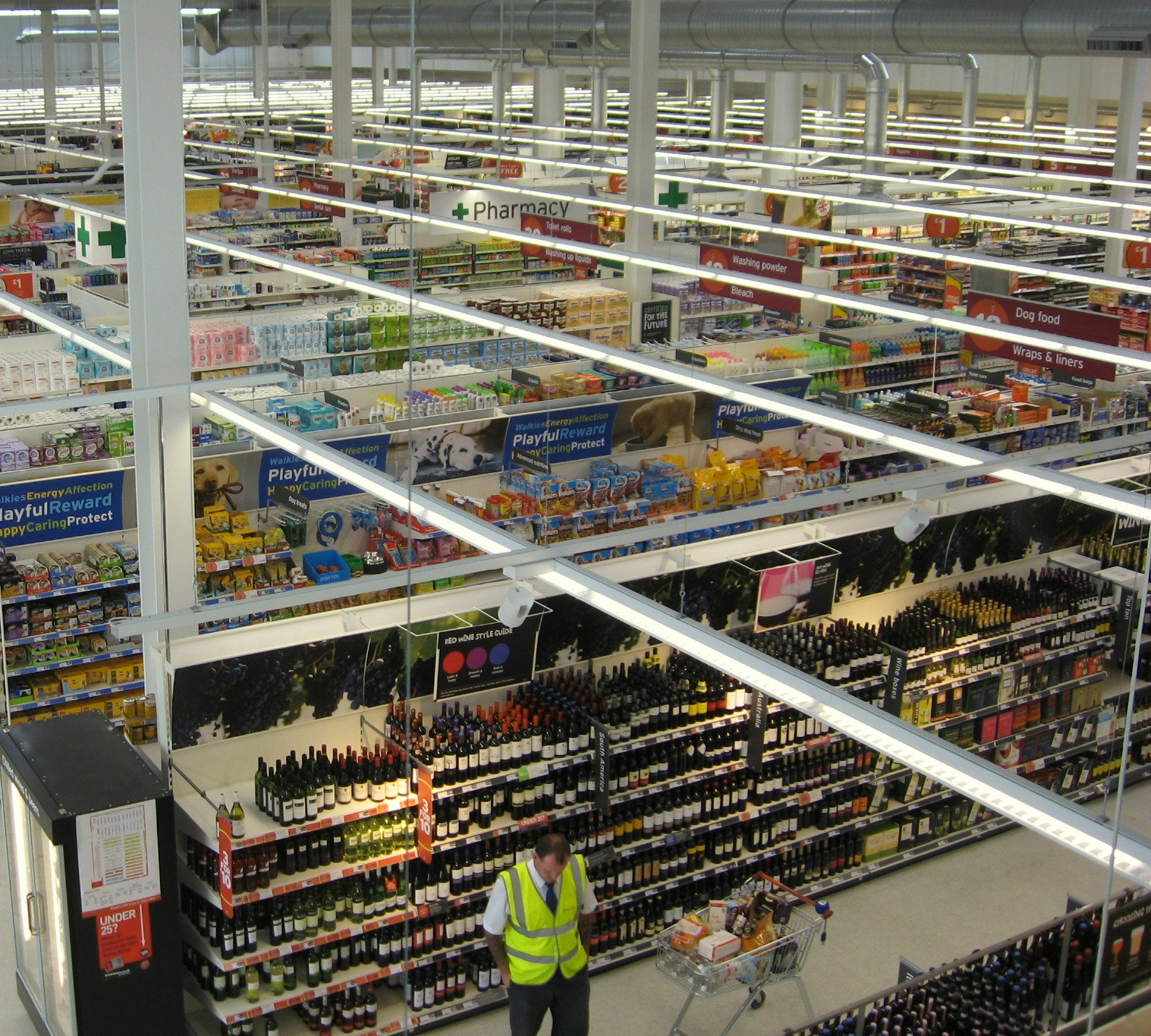
Interior of Sainsbury's Gloucester Quays shop

On 29 September 2010, Sainsbury's opened one of its largest UK shops, an extension of its existing shop in Crayford, South East London, which now has more than 100,000 sq ft (9,300 m^{2}) of retail space and is its largest supermarket to be built in the UK. Bybrook Superstore in Ashford, Kent, which reopened on 16 November 2011, has more than 100,000 sq ft (9,300 m^{2}).

The refurbished Lincoln, Lincolnshire shop opened on 24 November 2010, making it the UK's second-largest Sainsbury's supermarket after Crayford at 98,712 sq ft (9,171 m^{2}).

Shops in the 'supermarket' category all have similar layouts and operations but may vary in their choice of range to the customer. Most will have a convenience kiosk for cigarette sales and refunds/exchanges, produce, meat, fish, groceries and frozen food, plus staffed and self-service checkouts. However, depending on the size of the premises, they may also have an in-shop bakery, pizza counter, a cafe or Fresh Kitchen, Tu clothing, general merchandise with some stores having an on-site Argos and / or petrol station along with an online picking department. Some shops also feature concessions such as a beauty hall, travel agents, Jessops, Patisserie Valerie, Specsavers, Carte D'or and Ben and Jerry's ice cream stands, Zizzi pizza counters, Sushi Gourmet counters, and The Fragrance Shop. Others also feature a "Centre for Dentistry" where dental treatments are offered and/or an "Explore Learning" centre where children are offered extra English and Maths tuition. Some shops also feature a Starbucks café instead of a Sainsbury's branded cafe.

In March 2020, due to the declaration of the UK lockdown as a result of the coronavirus pandemic and the panic buying that followed nationwide as a result, Sainsbury's supermarkets allowed shoppers to buy no more than three of each food item, to ensure all visitors have access to the products they need.

==== Sainsbury's Fuel ====
Sainsbury's operates a chain of fuel forecourts located at some of its supermarkets selling diesel, petrol and City Diesel. The chain first opened a forecourt in 1974 at its Croydon SavaCentre hypermarket, the forecourts were initially supplied by and marketed as Jet stations. However, from 1980 onwards Sainsbury's operated its own forecourts and sourced its own fuel. In 2004, BP became the supplier of fuel and operated its forecourts at supermarkets where possible. This deal ended in 2009 and operation of all forecourts and fuel sourcing returned to the control of Sainsbury's.

==== Sainsbury's Café ====
Several shops operate self-service cafés, marketed as Sainsbury's Café, of which most are open for the same hours as the supermarket itself. In 2022, 200 of these cafes were closed which placed 2,000 jobs at risk. In January 2025, Sainsbury's confirmed that it would be closing its final 61 cafes, subject to consultation. The closure date for the cafes was later confirmed as 11 April 2025.

=== Sainsbury's Local ===
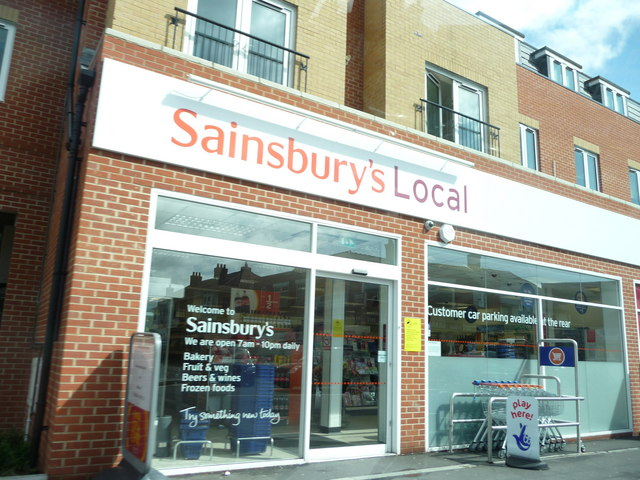
Sainsbury's Local in Winton, Bournemouth

In 1998, Sainsbury's piloted its first Local shop in Hammersmith. The shop opened on the busy Fulham Palace Road and was designed for the convenience of customers who did not have time to do a full weekly food shop.

As well as developing its own sites, Sainsbury's expanded its convenience portfolio through a series of acquisitions. These were:

- Bells Stores: In February 2004, Sainsbury’s announced it was to buy Bells Stores in the North East of England for around £22m. Bells Stores operated 54 neighbourhood shops, and was owned and run by the Bell family. The shops were initially refurbished to trade as 'Sainsbury’s at Bells'.
- Jacksons Stores: In August 2004 Sainsbury's further increased its presence in the convenience shop sector, by acquiring Jacksons Stores for £78m from the family food business William Jackson & Son Ltd, owned by the Oughtred family. Jacksons Stores had 114 shops in the Yorkshire area and the North Midlands, and just before the Sainsbury's acquisition, was voted the UK's best independent convenience shop chain. The acquisition doubled Sainsbury's market share in the convenience shop sector to 2%. The shops were initially refurbished to trade as ‘Sainsbury’s at Jacksons’.
- J B Beaumont: In November 2004, Sainsbury's acquired JB Beaumont, a convenience chain owned and run by the Beaumont family and which was then number 48 in the Grocer Top 50. The company first began trading as a butcher in Kirkby-in-Ashfield (Nottinghamshire) in 1902. The six JB Beaumont shops were located in Cotgrave; Bingham; Keyworth; Long Eaton; Chilwell and Gedling. The shops were initially refurbished to trade as 'Sainsbury's at Beaumonts'.
- S L Shaw: In April 2005, Sainsbury's acquired SL Shaw Ltd, a neighbourhood convenience shop operator with five shops in the south-east of England. After a programme of refurbishment, the five shops converted to the Sainsbury's Local format, combining Shaw's reputation and customer service with Sainsbury's expertise in fresh and convenience foods.

Sainsbury's initially retained the strong Bells, Jacksons and Beaumont branding. For example, refurbished shops were called Sainsbury's at Bells. These were effectively Sainsbury's Local shops with a revised fascia, retaining some features of the former local chain. Unrefurbished shops retained the original brand and logo, but still offered Sainsbury's own brand products, pricing and some point of sale; however, they did not accept Nectar cards to collect points. The old websites were also retained with some Sainsbury's branding. However, all of these acquired shops were fully converted to the Sainsbury's Local fascia from 4 May 2007.

In July 2013, chief executive Justin King announced plans to focus on expanding its convenience shops.

=== Sainsbury's Online ===
Sainsbury's operates an internet shopping service branded as "Sainsbury's Online". Sainsbury's started e-commerce home delivery operations in 1995 when it introduced ‘Wine Direct' for internet wine sales. In 1996, on Monday 30 December it was announced that Sainsbury's has joined forces with Hewlett-Packard for the development of an Internet-based supermarket offering a full range of products. The new, digital supermarket was expected to be launched in March 1997.

On 22 November 1999, Sainsbury's started e-business in partnership with LineOne.

=== Distribution ===
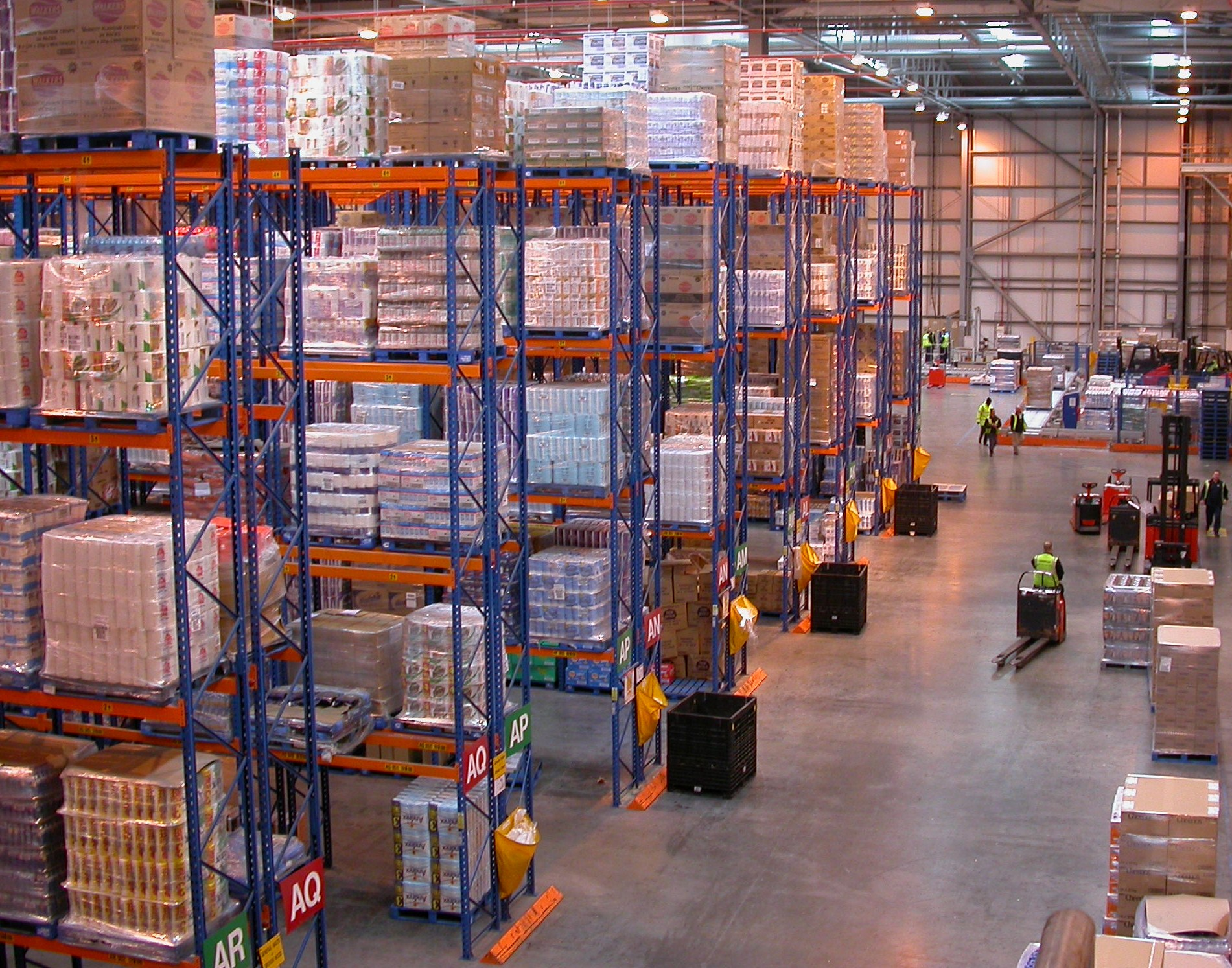
Sainsbury's distribution centre in Waltham Point

Sainsbury's supply chain operates from thirteen regional distribution centres (RDCs), with two national distribution centres for slower moving goods, and two frozen food facilities. In addition, the depot at Tamworth transships general merchandise to the RDCs.

Regional distribution centres

- Basingstoke, Hampshire
- Belfast, Northern Ireland
- Dartford, Kent
- Emerald Park, Emerson's Green, Bristol
- Greenford, London
- Vauxhall, London
- Hams Hall, Coleshill, West Midlands
- Haydock, St Helens, Merseyside
- Langlands Park, East Kilbride, South Lanarkshire
- Northampton, Northamptonshire
- Sherburn, North Yorkshire
- Waltham Point, Essex

Regional distribution centres – Slow Moving

- Rye Park, Hoddesdon, Hertfordshire
- Stoke, Staffordshire
- Tamworth, Staffordshire

National distribution centre – Frozen

- Pineham, Upton, Northamptonshire

National distribution centre – General Merchandise

- Daventry, Northamptonshire

National distribution centres – Clothing

- Bedford, Bedfordshire
- Shire Park, Worcestershire

A planned regional distribution centre (RDC) in Exeter was abandoned, and the land sold to German discounter rival Lidl.

The frozen foods RDC at Elstree in Hertfordshire closed with Sainsbury's relocating to a new national distribution centre at Pineham, just outside Northampton.

== Subsidiaries ==
=== Sainsbury's Money ===
In 1997, Sainsbury's Bank was established – a joint venture between J Sainsbury plc and the Bank of Scotland, later a part of the Lloyds Banking Group. Services offered include car, life, home, pet and travel insurance as well as health cover, loans, credit cards, savings accounts and individual savings accounts. On 8 May 2013, Sainsbury's announced it would buy the 50% share in the business owned by Lloyds Banking Group. In October 2024, Sainsbury's announced the sale of its personal loans, credit cards and savings business to NatWest, which completed on 1 May 2025.

On 30 July 2024, it was announced that the company's Travel Money bureau de change business had been sold to Irish financial services firm Fexco.

In July 2026, Sainsbury's Bank ceased to be a retail bank and was rebranded as Sainsbury's Money.

=== Sainsbury's Energy ===
Founded in 2011, Sainsbury's Energy is a virtual utility provider in partnership with nPower, which offers gas and electricity. Sainsbury's no longer have face-to-face salespeople in-store, but there are leaflets and posters etc. advertising Sainsbury's Energy in its supermarkets. Sainsbury's Energy was previously supplied by British Gas; the agreement ended in 2019 with nPower commencing supply from February. nPower in November 2019 was acquired by E.On Group as part of the acquisition of Innogy which led to E.On Next being the supplier for Sainsbury's Energy as of July 2020.

=== Argos ===
The company was founded in 1972 and its Green Shield Stamps catalogue shops were rebranded as Argos beginning in July 1974. Sainsbury's has agreed to sell Argos to Swift Partners, a company created for the purpose of the acquisition, with the transaction expected to complete in February 2027.

=== Habitat ===
Habitat is a furniture store, it was acquired by Sainsbury's in 2019, all standalone shops closed and now the brand solely exists as a replacement for Sainsbury's home in their supermarkets. Its larger sets of furniture are now provided by Argos, another one of Sainsbury's brands.

== Former formats and ventures ==
=== Sainsbury's Freezer Centres ===
Sainsbury's Freezer Centres were a frozen food chain operated between 1974 and 1986, the shops were entirely dedicated to frozen food. Due to competition from specialist frozen food chains such as Bejam, Sainsbury's converted its original service shops that were too small for modern use to small frozen specialist shops. The first shop opened at Southbourne near Bournemouth in 1974. Only 11% of households at that time owned freezers. Nine other branches that followed suit in that year, however, had greater success. They sold about 3,000 lines, many with deep discounts. The chain expanded to 21 shops at its height. As freezers became more popular, frozen food departments were designed into Sainsbury's main supermarkets, and the chain was sold to Bejam in 1986, which was ultimately sold to Iceland in 1989.

=== Sainsbury's SavaCentre ===
SavaCentre was a chain of 13 hypermarkets and 7 discount supermarkets operated between 1977 and 2005, initially in a joint venture with BHS. The shops ranged in size between 66,000 sq ft (6,100 m^{2}) and 117,000 sq ft (10,900 m^{2}), and the discount supermarkets between 31,000 sq ft (2,900 m^{2}) and 70,000 sq ft (6,500 m^{2}). At the time of its inception it was the only dedicated hypermarket chain in the UK. Shop layout consisted of a 50:50 split between food and non-food shopping, with a complete range of both retailers' products, and later included input from Habitat and Mothercare as they merged with BHS. Some shops also included features such as a petrol station and in-shop cafe. In 1989 Sainsbury's bought out BHS's stake, but still allowed BHS to retail from SavaCentres until it offered its own clothing and merchandise offering.

=== Sainsbury's Calais Wine Shop ===
Sainsbury's operated one alcohol hypermarket in partnership with Auchan in Calais, France for the lucrative UK booze cruise market. The shop closed in 2010 after describing the operation as 'economically unviable'.

=== Sainsbury's Market ===
In 2002, Sainsbury's opened an experimental shop in the Bluebird Building in Chelsea, London. The concept of the 'Market' shop was to provide a large range of fresh meat, fish, delicatessen items and bread through staff serving over counters. Staff were specially hired for their skill and passion for their roles in-shop. The layout also provided a larger than usual area for retailing fresh produce. The shop closed in 2004 after poor results. A second, much larger version in Pimlico was designated as a 'Market' shop, but the shop's branding and layout was gradually reverted to a standard Sainsbury's shop.

=== Fresh Kitchen ===
In 2011, Sainsbury's opened a trial food to go shop in Fleet Street London selling sandwiches, baguettes and hot snacks in an effort to expand its business into new areas of opportunity. The shop closed a year later, after the shop's lease was not renewed. Sainsbury's commented that footfall was too high to offer high standards of quality and service; however, it was not ruling out performing another trial in another location, explaining that it had learnt a lot. In 2020, Sainsbury's began to rebrand some in-store cafés to "Fresh Kitchen".

=== Mobile by Sainsbury's ===
Sainsbury's operated a virtual mobile network from 2001 until 2003 which closed due to being commercially unsustainable. In 2013 Sainsbury's re-entered the UK telecommunications industry when it launched a mobile phone network called Mobile by Sainsbury's. The virtual network was operated in partnership with Vodafone. The network was promoted heavily in-shop and most supermarkets started retailing SIM cards and handsets for the network. However, in 2015 Sainsbury's announced that the service would be closing in January 2016 after a breakdown in the relationship with its provider Vodafone.

=== Sainsbury's Compare and Save ===
Sainsbury's Compare and Save was a comparison and switching service website that promoted a wide range of television, broadband and telephone deals from a variety of providers. The service, free to Sainsbury's customers, claimed to list 15,000 different packages. The website and service launched in 2008 and was operated by SimplifyDigital.

=== Sainsbury's Pharmacy ===
Sainsbury's operated 270 pharmacies within its supermarkets. Sainsbury's also operated pharmacies at three major UK hospitals: Guy's Hospital, St Thomas' Hospital and James Cook University Hospital. In July 2015 Sainsbury's announced it was selling its 281 pharmacies to Lloydspharmacy for £125 million with all 2,500 pharmacy employees being transferred and new rent agreements being made. In June 2023, LloydsPharmacy announced that all Lloyds Pharmacies within Sainsbury's stores would close.

=== Sainsbury's Entertainment ===
Sainsbury's Entertainment was a transactional website which provided films as downloads or for streaming, using Rovi Corporation software. The site arranged to register with ATVOD as a video on demand service. The website also sold MP3 downloads as well as eBooks through aNobii. The site began operating in 2010 and until March 2014 also sold physical products including DVDs, CDs, Blu-ray discs and books. These were posted to the customer by a distributor, which after 2011 was Sainsbury's subsidiary company: Global Media Vault Ltd. Customers received nectar points from shopping at Sainsbury's Entertainment. Sainsbury's announced in September 2016 that it would close the business on 30 November 2016.

=== Sainsbury's Welcome Break Partnership ===
In 2006, Sainsbury's opened a Convenience store at Birchanger Green services, operated by owners Welcome Break.

=== Sainsbury's Euro Garages Partnership ===
Sainsbury's trialed franchising its convenience store format to Euro Garages, which planned to operate six small stores within its service stations, replacing some of its hundreds of SPAR stores, the first time Sainsbury's has trusted a third party to operate a Sainsbury's store since 2006. Beginning in Blackburn in 2016 Sainsbury's re-trained EuroGarages staff of 15 to operate the convenience store and later followed with stores in Heathrow and Bury. In February 2018 Sainsbury's issued a statement calling a mutual end to the trial: "following a commercial review, a joint decision has been made to bring the trial to a close." In 2019, the partnership was continued with a new format called "Sainsbury's on the Go" aimed at travellers, carrying travel and snack products. These stores were opened in spaces at former Little Chef restaurants and in the petrol stations, replacing SPAR. In October 2020, the Issa Brothers bought ASDA and rebranded some stores to "ASDA on the Move" and the ones in the former Little Chef restaurants to SPAR. Few stores remain in the petrol stations, waiting for a rebrand whilst others in the former restaurants are now empty.

=== Sainsbury's Club Store ===
Not to be confused with SavaCentre stores, this was a one-off store at Castle Court in Bristol, designed purely to satisfy an existing planning requirement. Shoppers were only allowed to enter the store if registered members and resident within a 20 mile radius. This was due to having been opened by wholesaler Nurdin and Peacock (now part of Booker Group) in 1995 as a 'Cargo Club' members only store similar in format to Costco. Within a year new planning permission was obtained and all membership and residence options were dropped, the store was renamed and has been a regular supermarket since.

== Product ranges ==
These own-brand lines include:

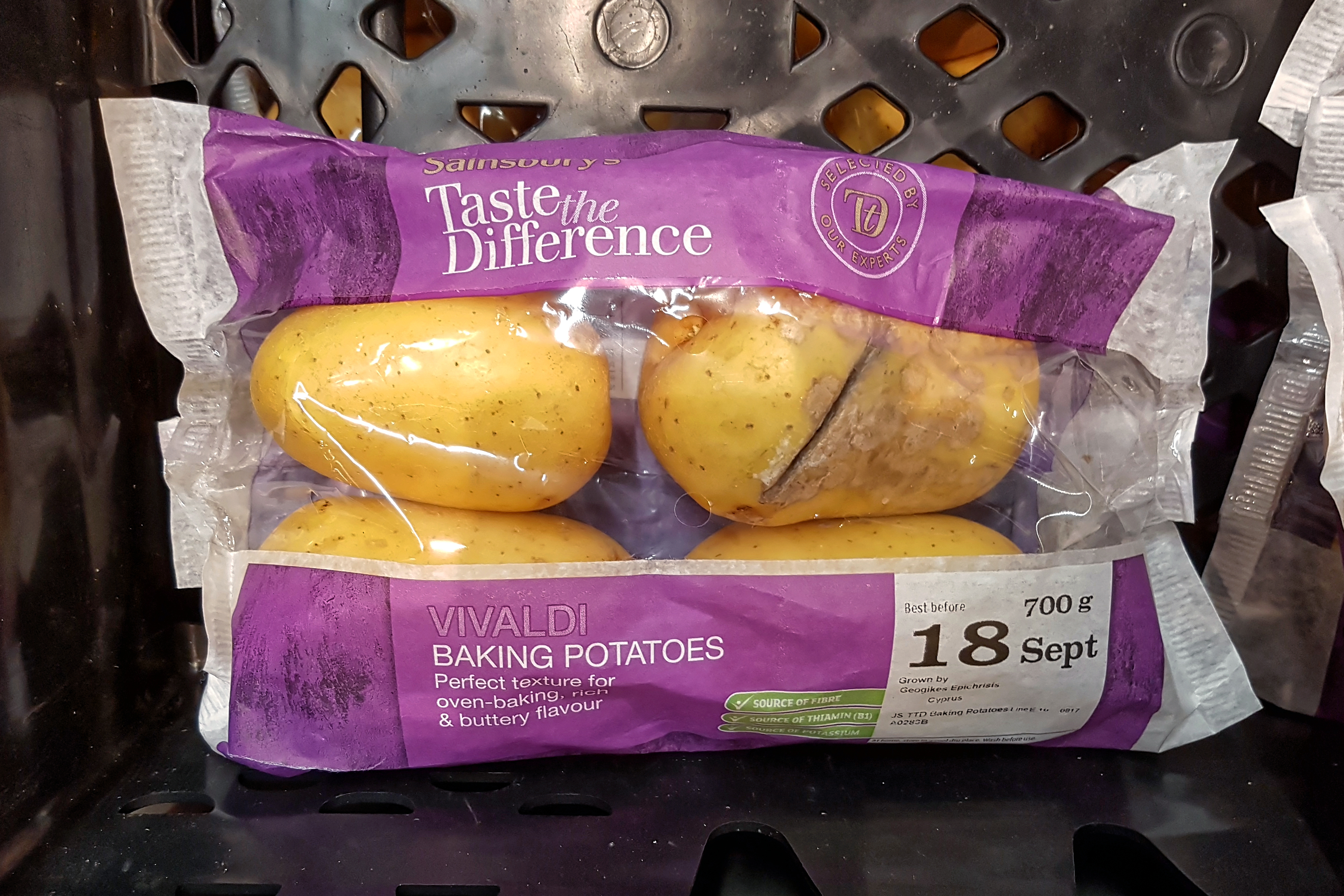
The Taste the Difference premium range

Current ranges	Description
by Sainsbury's	The core range of own-brand food products (more than 6,500 different lines) have been re-branded as "by Sainsbury's". This was first introduced on frozen foods in late 2010, and the re-branding was completed in January 2013.
Be Good To Yourself	Products with reduced calorific and/or fat content. The BGTY range was relaunched in January 2010.
My Goodness!	Similar to the BGTY range, 'My Goodness!' is a range of healthy foods from Sainsbury's.
Free From	Launched in 2002, it has more than 75 product lines. These products are all grouped together in one aisle of the shop (except fresh and frozen lines). These products are suitable for those allergic to dairy, wheat and gluten (although some are free from wheat/gluten but contain dairy). The range was relaunched in September 2016 as Deliciously FreeFrom, the range has also doubled in offer with now more than 150 lines.
SO Organic	Around 500 lines of food and drink which are derived from sources produced in accordance with organic standards.
Taste the Difference	First launched in 1999, premium own-brand with around 1,800 lines. Similar to Asda's Extra Special, Tesco's Finest and Morrisons' The Best.
Former ranges	Description
Basics	The Basics range used minimal packaging with simple orange and white designs. Equivalent to Tesco's Everyday Value, Asda's Smart Price and Morrisons' M Savers. Additional product lines were added in late 2013, together with new packaging. From late 2019 onwards, Basics was replaced with 12 "tertiary" brands; these are sub-brands, for example the "Stamford St" ready meals and frozen foods brand that references the company's former headquarters location. Subsequently, "Stamford St" replaced all other tertiary brands.
Jeff & Co.	The predecessor to TU clothing, designed by Jeff Banks.
Different by Design	The non-food equivalent of Taste the Difference, which included some flowers (which were previously branded "Orlando Hamilton"). Used the same logo and typeface as Taste the Difference.
Kids	Lines targeted at children (2006–2012).
Blue Parrot Café	Lines targeted at children (until 2006).
Economy	The predecessor to Sainsbury's Basics. Economy was succeeded by Low Price in c. 2001 and then was ultimately succeeded by Basics.

== Marketing and branding ==
=== Shop fascias ===
The flagship supermarket in Greenwich, South London, first trialled a modern "Sainsbury's" look, leading to the term 'Greenwich Blue', which was used to describe the signature colour of new identity. After its success most supermarkets were refurbished with dark blue walls, bright orange wall panels and grey shelving, as well as new checkouts. Individual counters also had different, brightly coloured panels behind them. Gradually the format was rolled out across the entire Sainsbury's estate. The 'Greenwich Blue' look has been phased out and new supermarkets now have a fresher look. Old external signage bearing the 'J Sainsbury' name was still to be found in use as recently as summer 2011 in Swindon, Ashbourne in Derbyshire and Blackheath, West Midlands.

=== Nectar loyalty card ===
Sainsbury's was a founding member of the UK's largest retail loyalty scheme, called 'Nectar', in 2002. The scheme allows customers to earn points on almost everything bought from Sainsbury's as well as from other participating retailers in return for a large range of rewards. For every pound spent the customer earns 1 point – a reward equivalent to 0.5% of supermarket purchases. Since 2015 Sainsbury's no longer offers 1 bonus point for every carrier bag the customer reuses.

From April 2015, Sainsbury's halved the number of points that customers earned for every pound, to one point per pound. Sainsbury's previously operated Sainsbury's Reward Scheme between 1995 and 2002 where customers used 'Reward Cards' or 'Storecards' to earn and spend points in a similar way, but limited to Sainsbury's businesses.

On 1 February 2018, Sainsbury's announced that it had acquired all assets, staff, systems and licences required for the full and independent operation of the Nectar loyalty programme in the UK through the acquisition of the shares of Aimia Inc's UK business for £60 million.

=== Sainsbury's Active Kids ===
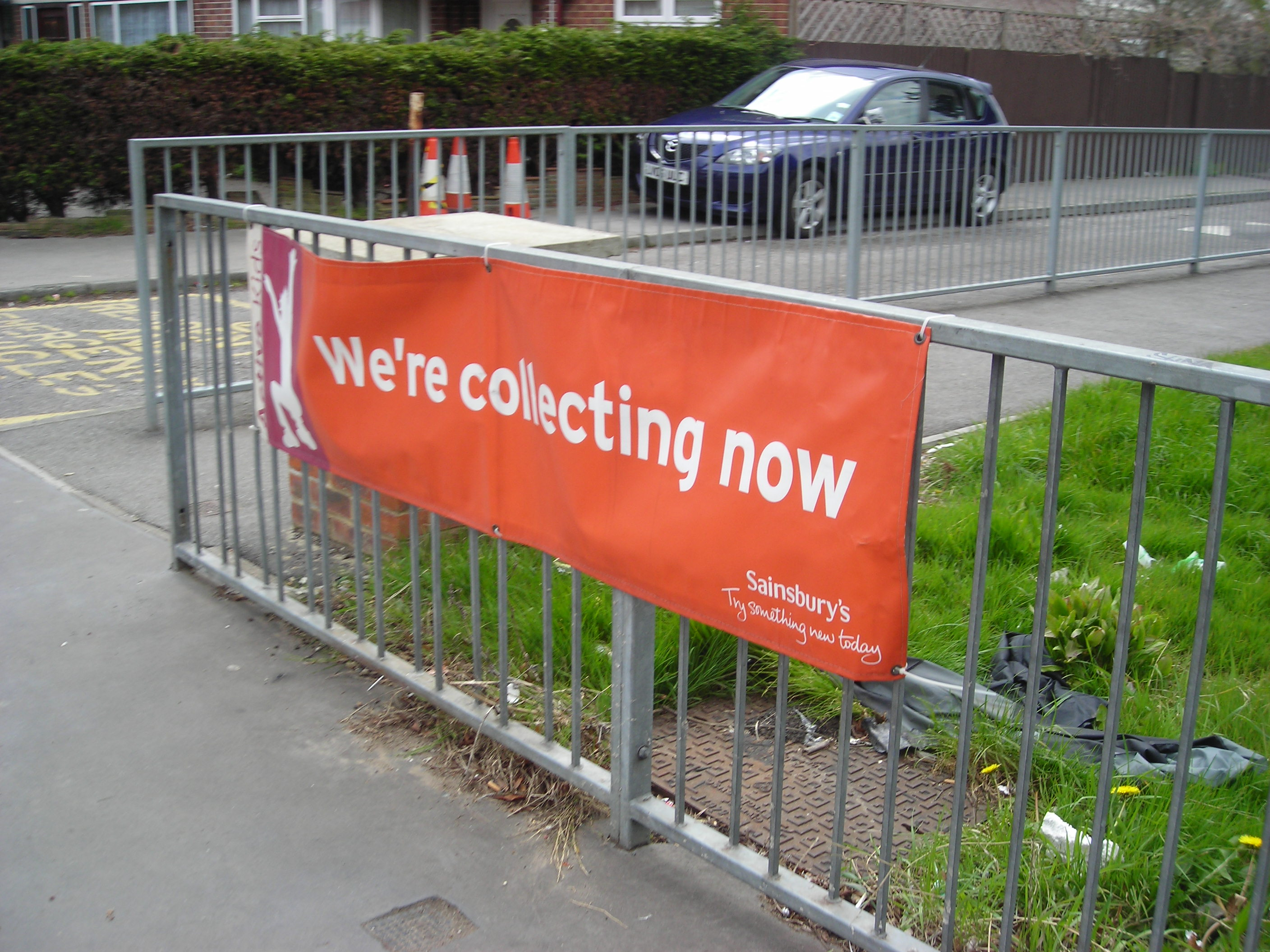
A Sainsbury's Active Kids banner outside a school. Tokens are collected at supermarkets and are redeemed for sports equipment.

Until 2017, Sainsbury's ran an annual voucher scheme for local organisations to redeem against equipment for sports and other activities. Customers earned vouchers from their shopping which they donated to an organisation of their choice, which then redeemed the vouchers with Sainsbury's, crediting their account with points to spend on items from a catalogue.

=== Brand match ===
In 2011, Sainsbury's introduced brand match which matched the prices of rival supermarket chains. In March 2014, it stopped matching prices with Tesco. In August 2015 it rolled out the match pricing online. In April 2016, it stopped the brand match completely, but still allowed customers to use the vouchers for two weeks after the offer closed. Tesco took Sainsbury's brand match vouchers for two months after the offer finished.

=== Brand ambassadors ===
2000–2011: Jamie Oliver was the public face of Sainsbury's, appearing on television and radio advertisements and in-shop promotional material. The deal earned him an estimated £1.2 million every year. In the first two years of these advertisements were estimated to have given Sainsbury's an extra £1 billion of sales or £200 million gross profit.

2010–2017: Paralympic swimmer Ellie Simmonds was a Sainsbury's Active Kids ambassador.

2012–2014: Former footballer David Beckham was a Sainsbury's Active Kids ambassador, in a deal that was claimed to be worth more than £3.5 million.

=== Slogans ===
Over the years, Sainsbury's has used many slogans:

- "Quality perfect, Prices Lower" – The slogan used on the shop-front of the Islington shop in 1882.
- "Sainsbury's For Quality, Sainsbury's For Value" – Used from the early 20th century.
- "Sainsbury's. Essentials for the Essentials." – Used from around 1993.
- "Good Food Costs Less At Sainsbury's" – Used from the 1960s to the 1990s. Described by BBC News as "probably the best-known advertising slogan in retailing."
- "Sainsbury's – Everyone's Favourite Ingredient" – Used in a series of TV commercials in the 1990s which featured celebrities cooking Sainsbury's food.
- "Value to shout about" – A 1998/1999 campaign fronted by John Cleese which was widely claimed to have been a major mistake. Sainsbury's said it actually depressed sales. However, the company had been losing sales for years because of the rise of Tesco.
- "Making Life Taste Better" – Introduced in 1999 and used until May 2005.
- "Try something new today" – Introduced in September 2005 until September 2011.
- "Value where it matters" – Used in advertising from late 2010 until May 2011.
- "Clothes You Can't Wait To Wear" – Used in all new advertising for TU Clothing as part of advertising campaign throughout May 2011.
- "Live Well For Less" – Introduced in September 2011 until February 2021 following an 18-month business review.
- "Christmas is for Sharing" – Used for all Sainsburys' Christmas adverts from 2013 to present.
- "Here's to Extraordinary" – Used only throughout 2012 to promote sponsorship of the London 2012 Paralympic Games.
- "Helping Everyone Eat Better" – Introduced in February 2021 after being named Principal Supermarket Partner of the 2021 United Nations Climate Change Conference (COP26) summit in Glasgow.
- "Good food for all of us" – Launching in November 2023

Sainsbury's was a sponsor of the Paralympic Summer Games in London 2012 and it was the largest sponsorship signing in the history of the Games.

== Staffing ==
In 2010, Sainsbury's opened seven food colleges that teach fishmongery, butchery, breadmaking and confectioning. 21,000 staff have been trained at these venues so far. Qualifications can be gained through training given in-house, and so far 15,400 staff have been awarded City and Guild qualifications.

'Our Sainsbury's' is a social and information website for staff to use to access staff benefits and information, and to interact with other colleagues.

=== Employee relations ===
Great Place to Work Group

Each supermarket or group of conveniences shops elects a group of 'representatives' from across their shop or region to meet once a month to discuss the working life of their branch and the company. The meetings can include communication from Head Office, the chance to organise charity or local events and the opportunity for employee's to discuss issues and feedback or question the attending Store Manager. The group controls a budget for donating to local charities and a budget for investing in employee facilities. The group was previously known as the 'Colleague Council', a separate version for young employees was called 'Youth Forum' and another separate group called 'SSA Council' existed to organise events in shops. A change in 2014 combined all three into 'Great Place To Work Groups'. The shop groups are part of a national structure, meeting monthly at shops and depots, then monthly at a regional level and then finally at a national meeting less frequently. The shop level is chaired by Store Managers, regional level by a Store Manager and Regional Operations Manager and nationally by the Groups HR Director.

Sainsbury's Staff Association

Sainsbury's Staff Association was founded in 1947. It is owned and run by Sainsbury's staff. All permanent staff can join at a cost of £1 every 28 days for one person (or £1.20 every 28 days for two people). The funds raised are collected into accounts in every shop, and spent on whatever the shop's SSA staff wish, usually social events and experiences out of shop. Benefits also include further discounts with other retailers.

Sainsbury's Veterans Association

Sainsbury's Veterans Association was started in 1947 by eight staff who wished all staff to stay in touch with each other. Today members enjoy a range of benefits including Honorary SSA membership, 10% discount, newsletters, invitation to an annual reunion, a visitor service, birthday and anniversary gifts, donation upon bereavement and transfer of benefits to spouse upon death. To qualify staff have to serve 25 years with the company at the time of their retirement or redundancy. The association's current and former presidents have included former Sainsbury's CEO and later Chairman Lord Sainsbury of Preston Candover and former Sainsbury's CEO Dino Adriano.

== Animal welfare ==
Sainsbury's supplies a vast majority of its meat from intensive farms, as such there is frequent reporting of animal abuse in its supply chains. In December 2021 undercover footage emerged from an intensive chicken farm in Sainsbury's supply chain leading to criticism. A Sainsbury's spokesperson said: "We care deeply about the welfare of animals entering our supply chain and expect all suppliers to uphold the highest animal-welfare standards." Subsequent issues arose in relation to the supply chain for ducks, pigs, piglets, and prawns. Sainsbury's sells 100% cage-free eggs, following a 2020 commitment.

== Archive ==
Sainsbury's archive of more than 16,000 items relating to the business since its foundation is kept at the Museum of London. The archive contains documents, product packaging and advertising.

== Ownership ==
Ownership in February 2023 was as follows:

- Qatar Investment Authority (QIA) shareholding stood at 14.3% of the shares.
- Vesa Equity Investment, the vehicle of Czech billionaire Daniel Křetínský's shareholding, stood at 10% of the shares.
- Costcutter owner Bestway shareholding stood at 4.47% of the shares.

== See also ==
- Sainsbury family
