= Groupe Habitat =

International chain of stores

Habitat Design International S.A.S.
- Company type: Limited company
- Industry: Retailer
- Founded: 1973
- Founders: Terence Conran and Philip Pollock
- Headquarters: Aubervilliers, France
- Number of locations: 61
- Area served: Worldwide (excluding the United Kingdom)
- Key people: Hervé Giaoui (Director)
- Products: Home accessories, furniture, upholstery
- Owner: Thierry Le Guénic
- Website: www.habitat-design.com

Groupe Habitat is an international chain of stores of British origin created by Sir Terence Conran in 1973, which specialises in the sale of furniture and contemporary decorative accessories. In September 2011 it was purchased by the French group Cafom SA distribution, who sold it to the industrialist Thierry Le Guénic in October 2020.

== History ==
On 11 May 1964, Sir Terence Conran, a young furniture designer and restaurateur, opened the first Habitat store on Fulham Road, London. It aimed to modernise the British furniture industry offering contemporary design at affordable prices. The brand then grew rapidly by anticipating the tastes of the public.

In 1973, the company opened its first French store in Paris, in the Montparnasse district. For the next two decades, Habitat continued its expansion in Europe, opening stores in France, Spain and Germany.

In the 1980s, Sir Terence Conran merged Habitat into the Storehouse plc group, which included British Home Stores, Richard Shops, Mothercare, Heal's and a 50% share of SavaCentre.

In 1992, Habitat joined the Ikano group. Founded by the Swedish businessman Ingvar Kamprad, founder and owner of IKEA, Ikano consisted of independent companies operating in different sectors. During this period, the Kamprad family recruited new talents, such as Vittorio Radice, and consolidated the Habitat brand on the furniture and interior markets. In 1998, Tom Dixon was also asappointed director of design.

In September 2011, Habitat joined the Cafom SA group (except the United Kingdom subsidiary). Founded by Hervé Giaoui in 1985, Cafom SA is an independent French retail group specialising in home improvements. The group was already present on the French market through its online retail site Vente-unique.com and with a dozen stores overseas as well.

In 2011, French designer Pierre Favresse was appointed artistic director of the brand Habitat. In 2014, Habitat celebrates 50 years of existence, and uses big names to celebrate the event: Sir Terence Conran and Thierry Marx. On 19 March 2015, the former French Economy Minister, Arnaud Montebourg, is appointed Vice President of Habitat for Innovation.

Cafom SA sold Groupe Habitat to the industrialist Thierry Le Guénic in October 2020. However, the sale excluded the international intellectual property rights to the brand name "Habitat" (excluding the United Kingdom rights where it is owned by Sainsbury's), which would be retained and exclusively licensed from Cafom SA with an option to buy the brand in three years time.

== Locations ==
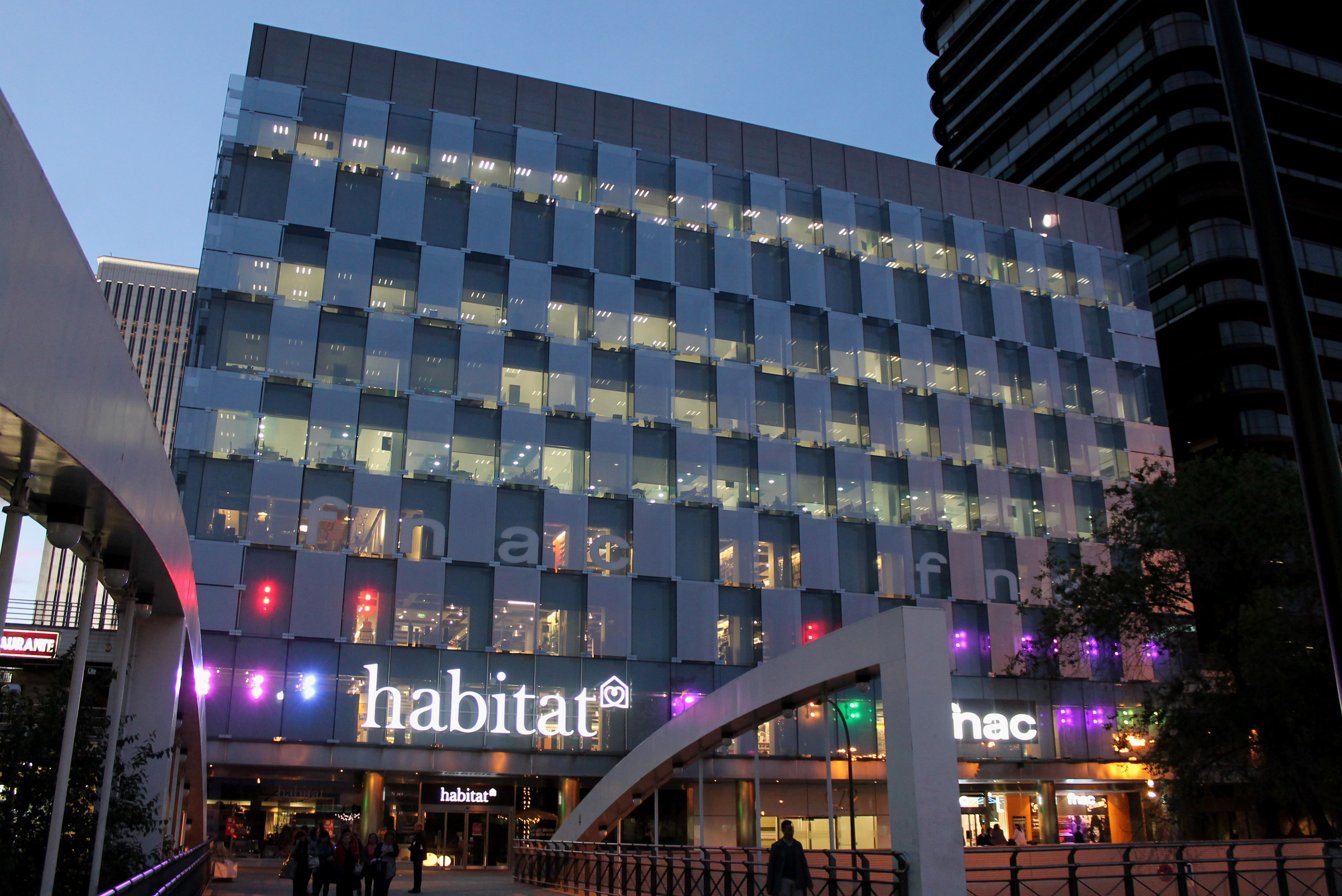
Habitat store in Madrid (Spain)

Habitat products are marketed in various European stores and on a website. As of October 2020 Habitat now has 31 stores in France (25), Monaco (1), Spain (3), and Switzerland (2) and three e-Commerce websites in France, Spain, and Belgium. As of October 2017, the company opened the first store in Italy since shut down in the 90s.

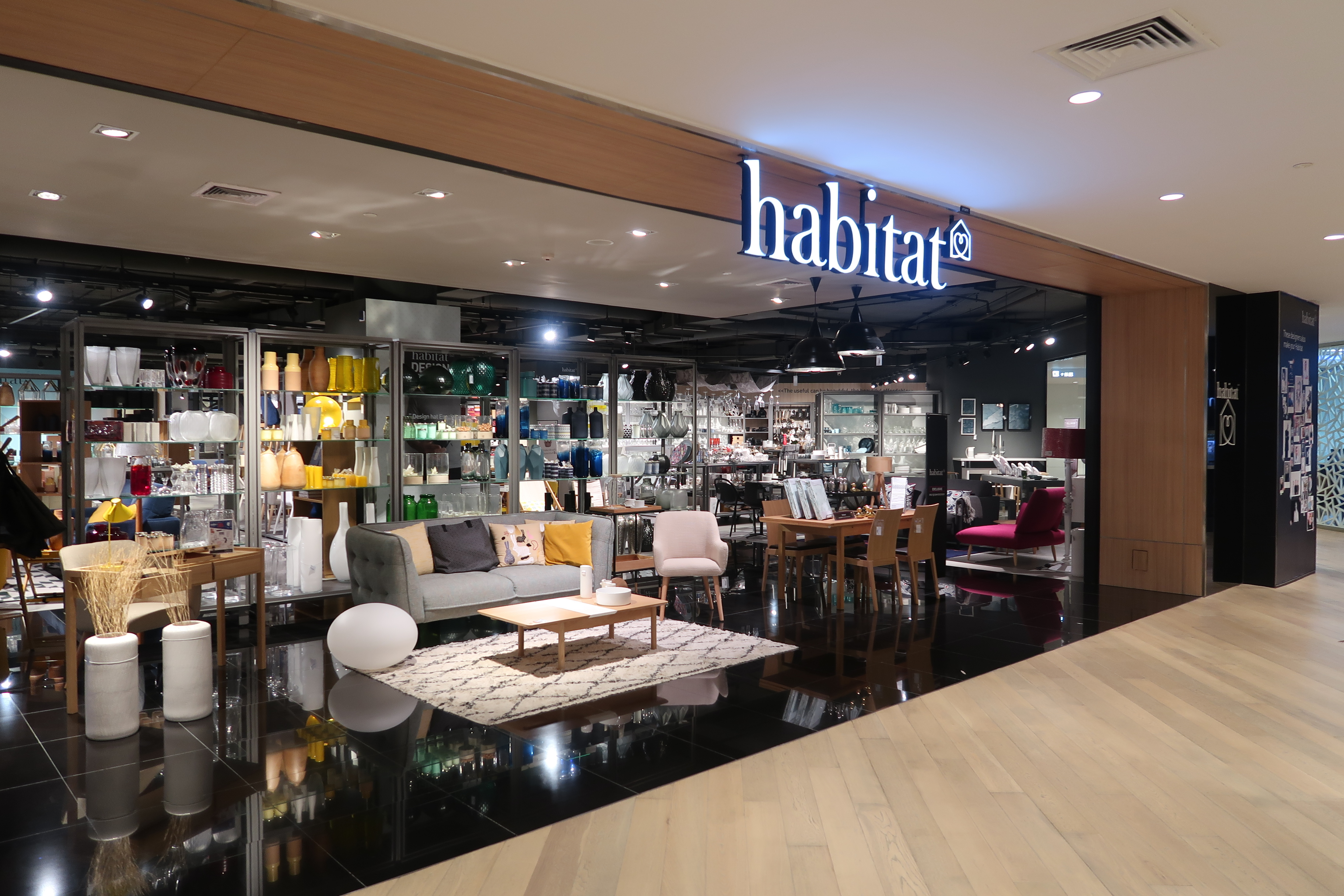
Habitat store in Siam Discovery, Bangkok, Thailand

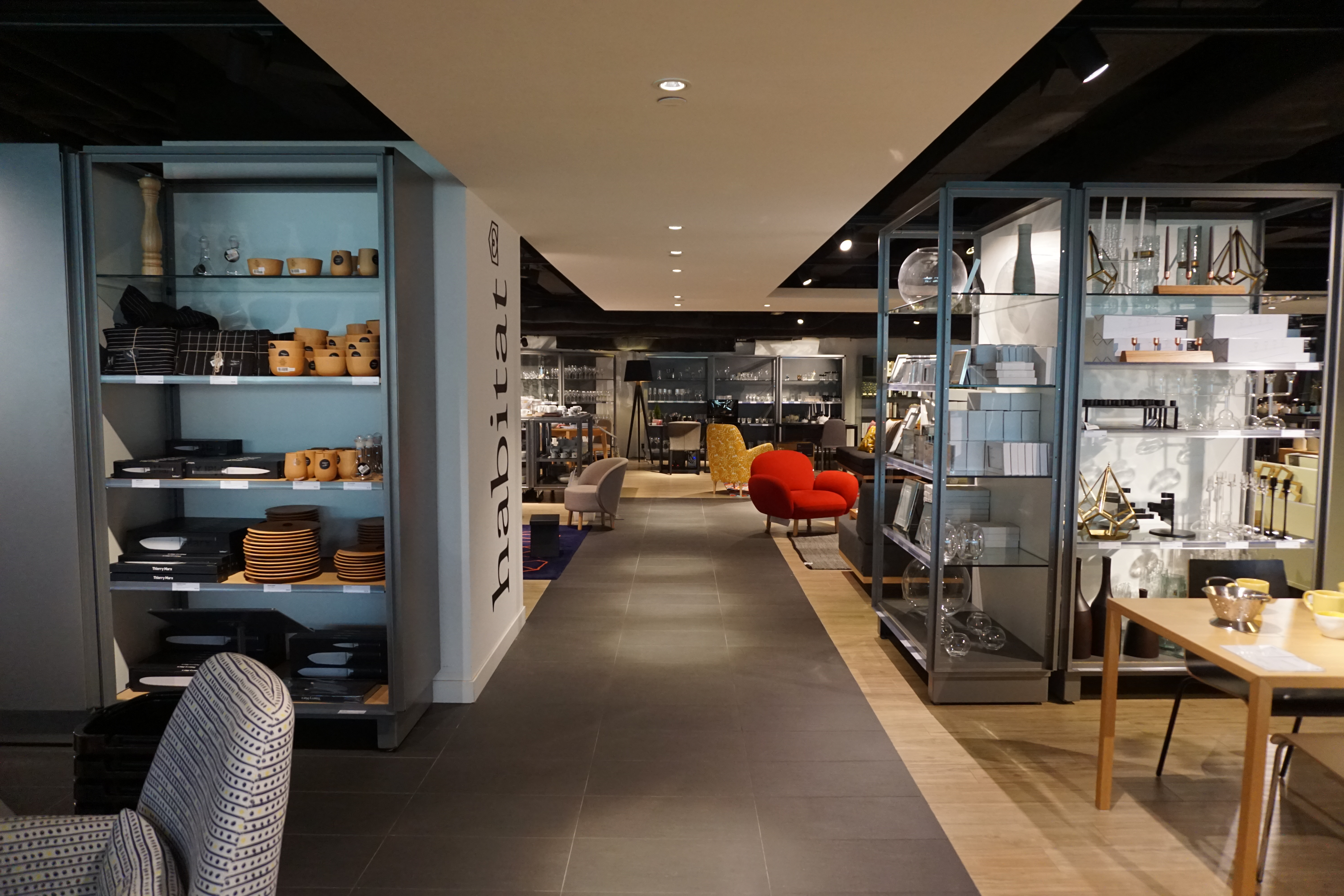
Habitat store in Windsor House, Causeway Bay, Hong Kong

As of October 2020, the company also has 30 franchise stores in countries including Belgium, China, Finland, French Guiana, Greece, Guatemala, Hong Kong, Iceland, La Réunion, Luxembourg, Madagascar, Malta, Martinique, Montenegro, Norway, Philippines, Portugal, Qatar, Saint-Martin, Singapore, South Africa, Saudi Arabia, Sweden, Thailand and Turkey.

== Products ==
Habitat offers specialised product lines in home furnishings and decorating: sofas and armchairs, living and dining rooms, offices, bedrooms and kitchens.
