= Habitat (brand) =

British retail furniture store

- Type: Private limited company
- Industry: Retailer
- Founded: 11 May 1964; 62 years ago
- Founders: Sir Terence Conran; Philip Pollock
- Headquarters: London, England
- Area served: United Kingdom
- Key people: Simon Roberts (Sainsbury's CEO)
- Products: Furniture; Home accessories; Upholstery
- Owner: Sainsbury's
- Parent: Argos
- Website: habitat.co.uk

Habitat is a brand of household furnishings headquartered in London, England, United Kingdom. It is owned by Argos, a subsidiary of the British supermarket chain Sainsbury's, and it serves as its main homewares brand for both.

Founded in 1964 by Terence Conran, it began as its own retailer, and merged with a number of other retailers in the 1980s to create Storehouse plc, before the latter sold Habitat in 1992 to the Ikano Group, owned by the Kamprad family.

In December 2009, the Habitat chain was bought by Hilco, a restructuring specialist. On 24 June 2011, Habitat was put into liquidation and all but three Habitat stores were closed in a deal to sell the indebted furniture chain, with the brand and the three London stores sold to Home Retail Group.

In September 2016, UK retailer Sainsbury's bought Home Retail Group, including Argos and Habitat, for £1.4 billion (about $1.85 billion).

== History ==
=== Beginning ===
Sir Terence Conran founded Habitat in London in 1964, opening his own store to market his Summa range of furniture. The first store was opened in Fulham Road in Chelsea by Conran, his then wife Caroline, Philip Pollock and the model Pagan Taylor. This store became the Habitat template, with its quarry tiled floor, whitewashed brick walls, white-painted wooden-slatted ceilings and spotlights creating a feeling of space and focusing attention on the product. Conran has said the main reason for the shop's initial success was that Habitat was one of the few places that sold cheap pasta storage jars just as the market for dried pasta took off in the UK.

=== Expansion ===
The business expanded quickly in the UK throughout the 1960s, with the first store outside London opening in Manchester and internationally with the first overseas store opening in 1973 in Paris. Habitat also published a catalogue that showed a range of products grouped together in pleasant surroundings.

=== Mergers ===
In 1968 Habitat merged with the stationery retailer Ryman to form Ryman Conran. The following year it purchased the business of Lupton Morton, which mostly supplied furniture to offices and corporations but also made pieces by other designers, and in 1970 acquired the retail chain Straker-Bedser.

By 1970 the turnover of the group had doubled since the merger with Habitat. Terence Conran however was disappointed that Habitat itself had not been expanded and offered to purchase Habitat from Ryman Conran along with Conran Associates and the remains of Lupton Morton. Ryman Conran did not highly value the Habitat chain and apparently thought it was making a loss, so agreed to the sale. Ryman Conran retained Habitat's original factory in Thetford along with Conran Design Group.

In 1981, the company's shares were floated on the London Stock Exchange and in 1982 it merged with Mothercare Group to form Habitat Mothercare Group plc. The now-listed company bought the furniture retailer Heal's and the Richard Shops fashion chain in 1983. In 1986, the company merged with British Home Stores to form Storehouse plc. The merger with British Home Stores also came with a 50% share of the SavaCentre hypermarket chain, a 50:50 Joint Enterprise with the supermarket chain Sainsbury's.

=== Subsequent buyouts ===
In 1992 Habitat was purchased from Storehouse by Ikano. In October 2009, following several years of trading losses, the Kamprad family, which owns Ikano, put the company up for sale, and it was sold to Hilco, a restructuring specialist, in December 2009 with the Kamprad family writing off the debts of the company and providing €50 million (£45 million) of working capital while Hilco paid about €15m.

=== Administration and sales ===
On 24 June 2011 Hilco, which had owned Habitat UK Ltd since December 2009, announced that it was putting the company into administration.

Home Retail Group (owner of Argos and Homebase) purchased the Habitat brand in the United Kingdom, three central London stores in Tottenham Court Road, King's Road and Finchley Road and the UK website for £24.5 million. The UK business was registered under the name Habitat Retail Ltd, a wholly owned subsidiary of Home Retail Group. Home Retail Group retained about 100 staff at the London stores and around 50 in head office, including many of Habitat's in-house designers, buyers and merchandisers. It then introduced 84 Mini Habitat stores within Homebase branches and also begun to offer a selection of Habitat products in 200 Homebase and Argos stores nationwide and on the Argos and Homebase websites.

By June 2011, all other Habitat stores in the UK had been closed by Hilco with around 750 employees being made redundant.

Cafom, a company registered in France, purchased Habitat's European businesses.

=== Purchase by Sainsbury's ===
In April 2016, Home Retail Group agreed to a £1.4bn takeover by UK retailer Sainsbury's. The deal included the sale of brands Argos and Habitat. The acquisition completed on 2 September 2016. Before the acquisition Home Retail Group sold the Homebase business to the Australian company Wesfarmers and all Habitat branches within Homebase stores were subsequently closed.

== Current operations ==
Habitat is the main homewares and furnishings brand within the Sainsbury's group. It is part of the Sainsbury's Argos business which runs general merchandise and clothing operations including Habitat, Argos, Sainsbury's Home products and Tu clothing. Larger Sainsbury's supermarkets also have Habitat homewares available. In November 2020 Sainsbury's announced that it wanted to have 80% of homewares and furniture sold within the Sainsbury's group under the Habitat brand by the end of 2021.

=== Habitat stores ===
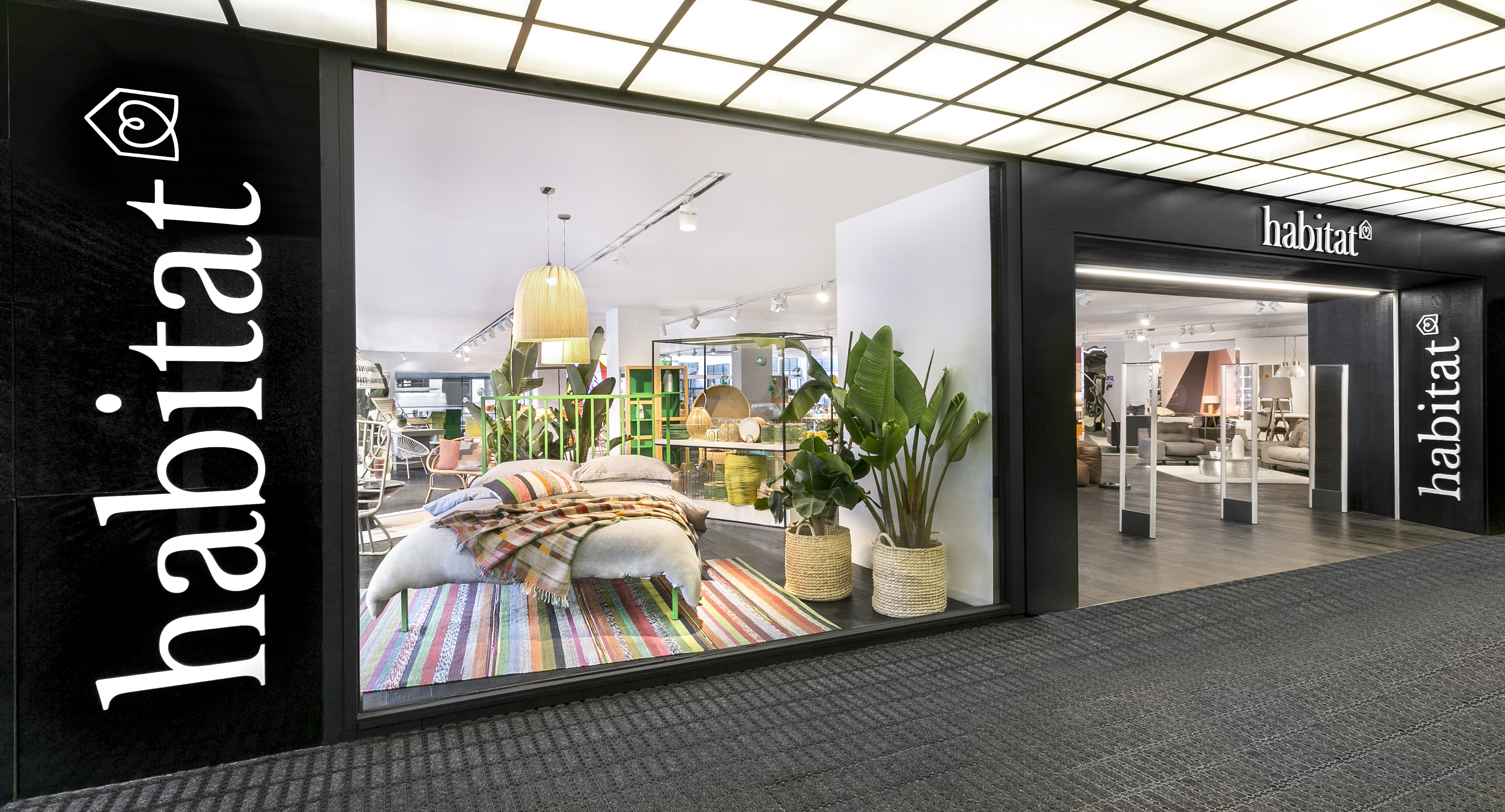
The entrance to Habitat's flagship store on Tottenham Court Road, London - April 2016

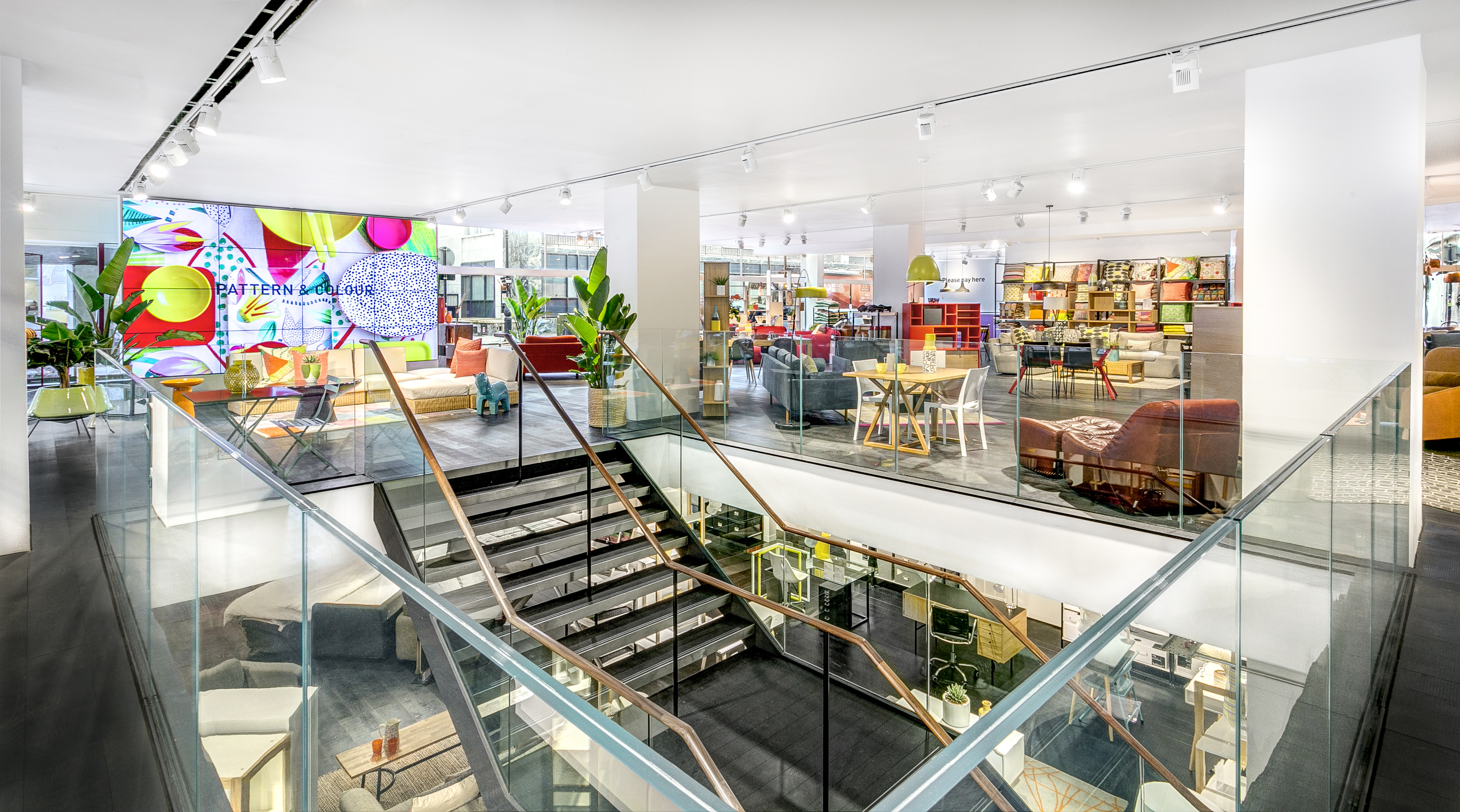
The re-designed interior of Habitat's flagship store on Tottenham Court Road, London. April 2016

In April 2016 Habitat unveiled a £1.5million refurbishment of its flagship 25,000 sq ft Tottenham Court Road store. Designed by the Habitat in-house Design Studio, the new store featured a completely new look and layout for the brand with a stripped back design and monochrome colour palette to highlight Habitat's bright product collections.

The Habitat store on King's Road in London closed in 2018. This was because the building it had occupied since 1973 is being redeveloped under plans submitted by the landowner Cadogan Estates and approved by the Kensington & Chelsea Council.

In 2018, the business opened two new standalone stores - one in Westfield White City as part of the extension of the shopping centre which was planned to attract more homeware and lifestyle brands and the other in Brighton; this was the location of one of Habitat's most successful Homebase concessions.

Sainsbury's announced in November 2020 that both the Habitat standalone stores in Tottenham Court Road (25,000 sq ft) and Finchley Road (18,000 sq ft) would close at the beginning of 2021, saying that it wanted to concentrate on selling Habitat products in its supermarkets and online. As of July 2021 the Tottenham Court Road store is now closed with the Habitat sign removed from the building and the store empty.

As of June 2023 Habitat has now closed all of its showrooms and moved to a solely online retail business.

=== E-commerce website ===
Habitat also has a transactional UK website, as well as offering a selection of Habitat products on the Argos website.

In January 2009, Habitat began planning a fully transactional web site to enter the online shopping market. The site was launched in November 2009, based on an E-commerce application from BT Expedite, with a back-end by LShift, after a period when only a small number of products were available online. Following feedback, the company announced a new website in January 2011, offering online delivery to UK, Germany and Republic of Ireland.

=== Sainsbury's concessions ===
There were 11 smaller Mini Habitat format branches located in Sainsbury's stores measuring between 1,400 sq ft and 2,000 sq ft between 2016 and 2020. The first three were opened at the end of 2016 and were located in Nine Elms in London, London Colney (a former SavaCentre) and Solihull.

The in-store concession opened in 2017 in the Sainsbury's hypermarket in Calcot, Berkshire was actually a re-instalment, as that store sold Habitat products in the late 1980s and early 1990s when it was a SavaCentre (a 50:50 BHS-Sainsbury Joint Enterprise) hypermarket when both BHS and Habitat were part of Storehouse plc.

Sainsbury's announced in 2020 that it would be permanently closing all 11 Habitat in-store concessions in its supermarkets with immediate effect, as its products would now be sold in the main self-service non-food areas of Sainsbury's supermarkets instead.

=== Sainsbury's Home replacement ===
When Habitat entered Sainsburys stores they took over the Sainsbury's Home brand and now uses its own and some Sainsbury's Home products.

=== International operations ===
The company used to have stores in Galway and Dublin in the Republic of Ireland but these were closed down in 2008. Habitat previously employed 1,574 staff and operated in 71 stores: 35 in the UK, 26 in France, five in Spain and five in Germany (as of October 2009). The international operations are now run by Groupe Habitat, part of Cafom between 2011 and 2020, and since 2020 owned by the industrialist Thierry Le Guénic.
