= Fredrica Coates =

American businesswoman, sculptor and philanthropist

Fredrica Vaughan Coates
- Born: 1 June 1948 (age 77); Steubenville, Ohio
- Citizenship: American
- Education: BA, MEd
- Alma mater: Westhampton College – University of Richmond, Pennsylvania State University
- Known for: First Velcro Cloth Diaper

Fredrica Vaughan Coates (born June 1, 1948) is an American inventor, educator, businesswoman, and sculptor. She is best known for inventing the first velcro cloth diaper. She is also the inventor of various other 'first of their kind' products.

== Early life and education ==
Fredrica Vaughan Coates was born on June 1, 1948 in Steubenville, Ohio, US. Growing up and going through graduate school, Fredrica sewed garments for friends and family. She also created paintings and portrait sculptures to fund her graduate education.

== Career ==
Fredrica was a teacher in public schools and taught art from 1971 to 1979. During this time, she primarily focused on supporting and guiding handicapped children to discover their artistic talents. Fredrica, as an Art Education teacher, was awarded a grant by the National Committee of Arts for the Handicapped. The organization chose her as the Director of the Charleston Committee, a specialized Art Education program in the public school system.

Fredrica used this grant to take students with disabilities to Washington, DC, to perform puppetry at the John F. Kennedy Center. Due to her efforts, the same group of disabled students, in addition to more than 100 other students with special needs, were also able to perform at the Piccolo Spoleto festival in Charleston, SC. This was a joint effort that Fredrica coordinated with the City of Charleston Office of Cultural Affairs. Their joint effort was to bring a 'first of its kind opportunity' for special needs children to perform at an international arts festival. Piccolo Spoleto was launched in 1979 by the City of Charleston Office of Cultural Affairs, which continues to work closely with an engaged group of volunteers from the Charleston arts community. Fredrica was responsible for organizing all of the performances at this festival by children with various disabilities, including vision and hearing-impaired children.

=== Inventions and patents ===
Fredrica holds 48 USA patents and 28 patents issued in various foreign countries. Some of her company's license agreements have featured exclusivity clauses with consultant provisions, while others have been non-exclusive, allowing multiple companies to market her products concurrently. Fredrica is also recognized as the inventor of ten other hybrid diapers and other garments of protection that use hook and loop fasteners.

In 1980, Fredrica and her husband, Dr. Michael Coates founded and established their first company named Designs by Fredrica. Through her company, Fredrica was able to license her first patents to Kendall, the McCall Pattern Company, the Geri-Care Corporation, Gerber Childrenswear, and a private label program for Walmart Stores.

Tailored Technologies Inc. was founded in 1994 to facilitate the extension of patent rights for international licensing, collaborating with European companies like Mothercare starting in 1997. Fredrica was responsible for pioneering three categories of patented products for Mothercare UK, the SmartNappy hybrid diaper system, the Newborn Snuggle Wrap, and the Mothercare Snuggle pod. The Mothercare Snuggle Pod is still for sale in many countries by Mothercare franchises. During this time, Fredrica also licensed China Star Products (HK) Limited for their own brand of nappies, Green Beginnings Asia Limited.

Fredrica's patents have been licensed by 20 different brand-name companies, resulting in the launch of 35 distinct products aimed at protecting various market segments. These segments include products designed for infants, toddlers, special needs children, and adults.

== Personal life ==
Fredrica has been married to Dr. Michael Coates for 52 years. They have three children and 6 grandchildren.

== Awards and recognition ==
- Inventor for China Star Company award – 'Best Eco Product in Hong Kong', Toys and Baby Fair 2013.
- Inventor for Kidsline and Cocalo Companies – 'Perfect Bum Advanced Reusable Diaper' and 'The Perfect Swaddle'
