= Gurgle =

British pregnancy and parenting website

Gurgle.com is a British pregnancy and parenting website owned by high-street parenting store Mothercare. Founded by Tom Wright, Gurgle launched as a joint venture between Mothercare aa, a family backed investment company, in October 2007. Mothercare bought Fleming Media out to become outright owner of Gurgle in September 2009. Since 2008 the site has been run by Pettrina Keogh, who joined the company from Telegraph Media Group. Gurgle is also the name of a character from Finding Nemo.

== Website content ==
Gurgle provides information on conception, pregnancy, birth, baby and toddlerhood. In April 2008 Mothercare announced that Gurgle had over 40,000 registered users. When Mothercare took sole ownership of the site it had grown to 100,000 members with 300,000 monthly unique users.

Gurgle.com hosts regular online webchats with parenting experts and celebrities. Recent webchats have included: Dr Miriam Stoppard, Tess Daly, midwife Vicki Scott, Myleene Klass, and Megan Faure, author of The Babysense Secrets. On 5 September 2011, gurgle.com hosted a webchat with Peter Andre. The next webchat will be with breastfeeding expert Vicki Scott on 29 September.

In June 2010 gurgle.com launched its first annual blog awards, 'The Gurgles'. The Gurgles was first held at The Soho Hotel, and the inaugural Best Blog Award was won by Claire "LazyGirlUK" Deegan (née Curran) The 20somethingmumblog, who went on to become a DJ on Radioactive FM UK. In the awards second year, blogs were nominated by gurgle users, before being shortlisted by an expert judging panel. The winners were voted for by the general public. The winner of the best overall blog for 2011 was A Mother's Ramblings.

The event was hosted by TV presenter Myleene Klass, who also writes a regular blog on the site.

== Magazine ==
In May 2011, gurgle.com launched a parenting magazine called Gurgle. The magazine is published by publishing and events company Media 10, and the editor is Scarlett Brady. Gurgle magazine is bimonthly, and features advice on parenting and tips for family life, fashion must-haves and celebrities. Gurgle magazine's USP is that 'you don't stop being you, just because you are a mum.'

The magazine is available in Mothercare and Early Learning Centre stores, Selected Sainsbury's stores, Waitrose, and 500 Independent Retailers.

== Publications ==
Gurgle published three books with HarperCollins in March 2009, combining Gurgle.com's articles with user generated content from the site. The books are: Pregnancy: how to enjoy it, Sleeping: solved and Feeding: solved.

In February 2011 Gurgle partnered with restaurant guide publisher Harden's, and baby food company Plum to produce Eating out with Babies and Toddlers, which features over 1,000 of the UK's best baby and toddler-friendly restaurants, cafes, and pubs.

Gurgle launched gurgle.com and gurgle.in, sister sites in America and India in July 2008.

In 2009 Gurgle launched the ‘Name My Baby’ application for Facebook. The site also has a Baby Budget Calculator application on Facebook.
