= Children's World (retailer) =

British retail chain

- Founded: 1987
- Defunct: 1997
- Fate: Acquired by Storehouse

Children's World Ltd was a British retail chain. It was established by Boots in 1987 and sold to Storehouse in 1996, when the stores were rebranded as Mothercare World.

== Format ==
The Children's World logo

At the time, Boots' larger high street stores sold a range of baby products, maternity and children's clothing. However the Children's World stores were a larger "superstore" format typically located in retail parks, which sold a wider range of clothing, shoes, toys, baby products and nursery furniture for children under 10. The stores also included a play area, a hairdresser and a snack bar. Boots was planning to spend £100 million in total on the 30 Children's World stores they intended to open. The first three stores opened in Dudley, Cricklewood and Leicester in the spring of 1987, with Boots hoping to show a profit within two years. Boots shares fell 1p on the announcement of the Children's World stores, with the City feeling that the business should concentrate on its existing chemist-based stores.

== Marketing ==
The logo resembled a pile of multicoloured building blocks. The slogan was "Everything in the World for Children".

== Finances ==
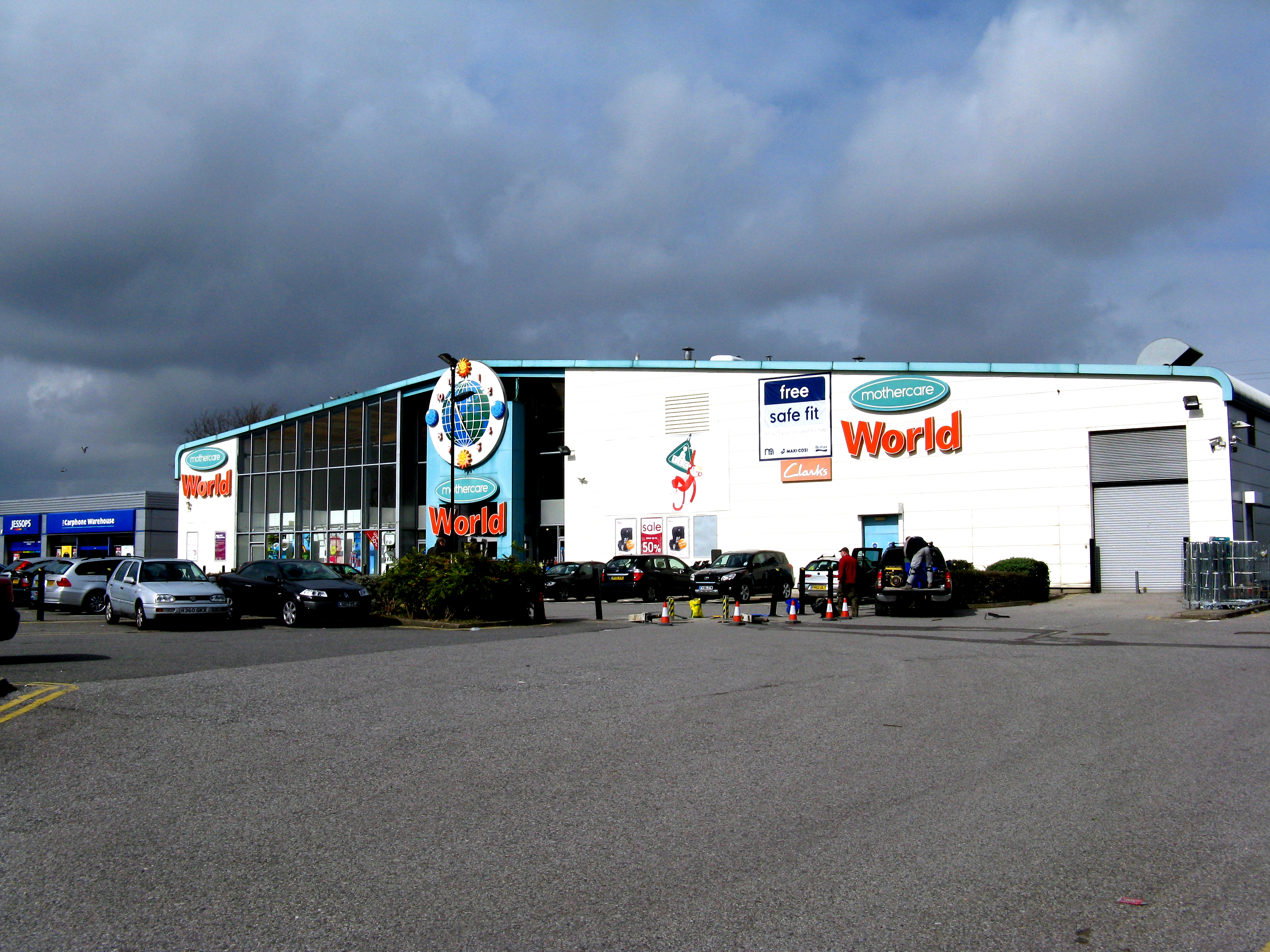
A former Children's World store rebranded to Mothercare World in Croydon

By 1995 the retailer had 48 stores and a turnover of £105 million. Storehouse acquired the business from Boots in 1996.
