= Heal's =

British furniture company and homeware store

Coordinates: 51.5212°N 0.1344°W

Heal's (1810) Ltd
- Formerly: Heal & Son
- Type: Subsidiary
- Industry: Retail
- Founded: 1810; 216 years ago
- Founders: John Harris Heal and son
- Headquarters: London, England, UK
- Number of locations: 7
- Key people: Hamish Mansbridge (CEO); Sir Ambrose Heal; Sir Terence Conran; Colin Pilgrim
- Products: Home furnishings
- Revenue: £37 million (2022-23)
- Net income: £800,000 (2022-23)
- Parent: Wittington Investments Limited
- Website: www.heals.com

Heal's (originally Heal & Son) is a British furniture and homeware retail company comprising seven stores, selling a range of furniture, lighting, and home accessories based in London, England. The business was started in 1810 by John Harris Heal, and its headquarters have been located in Tottenham Court Road since 1818. Under Sir Ambrose Heal, the company introduced Arts and Craft style to mechanised furniture production, making it available to the middle classes. In 2001, an official guide to the archive at the Victoria & Albert Museum wrote that for over two centuries, Heal's had been known for promoting modern design and for employing talented young designers. Since 2001, the business has been owned by Wittington Investments, a company owned by the Weston family.

== History ==
=== Early history ===
The original Heal's firm was established in 1810 as a feather-dressing for bed mattresses business at 33 Rathbone Place, London by John Harris Heal after moving from Devon. By 1815, Heal had started selling carpets, and in 1818, the business was moved to 203 Tottenham Court Road, London, to be closer to other furniture businesses. The business has operated from its present site in Tottenham Court Road, moving to no. 196 in 1840, the same year that John Harris Heal Junior, son of the founder of the same name, took charge of the company from his widowed mother, Fanny, who had run the firm after the death of her husband in 1833. Between 1833 and 1844, the company had traded as Fanny Heal & Son, before becoming Heal & Son. During this time the company moved into the manufacturing of bedroom furniture, with the business promoting the Heal Bed. Four years after moving to 196 Tottenham Court Road, Heal's added a steam plant for purifying and dressing feathers. Its first purpose-built store was completed in 1854, then one of the largest in London, and was designed by the architect James Morant Lockyer, who had presented the design to RIBA with a photographic elevation in May 1855. The store was expanded further by purchasing the neighbouring premises at 197 and 198 in 1864. By 1866, Heal's was issuing invitations in Charles Dickens's monthly instalments to visit Heal's to see their furniture displayed in room settings, which would later become a standard for all furniture retailers. John Harris Heal Jnr died in 1876, and the business was run by his brother-in-law, Alfred Brewer, along with John Harris son's, Harris and Ambrose. In 1894, Brewer retired, and Ambrose Senior took over as chairman. Ambrose Senior purchased the British patent rights from John Staple, which improved the support of springs in upholstery, and then set up Staples & Co. as an independent bedding factory using these patents, with his son Harold given control.

=== The arrival of Sir Ambrose Heal ===
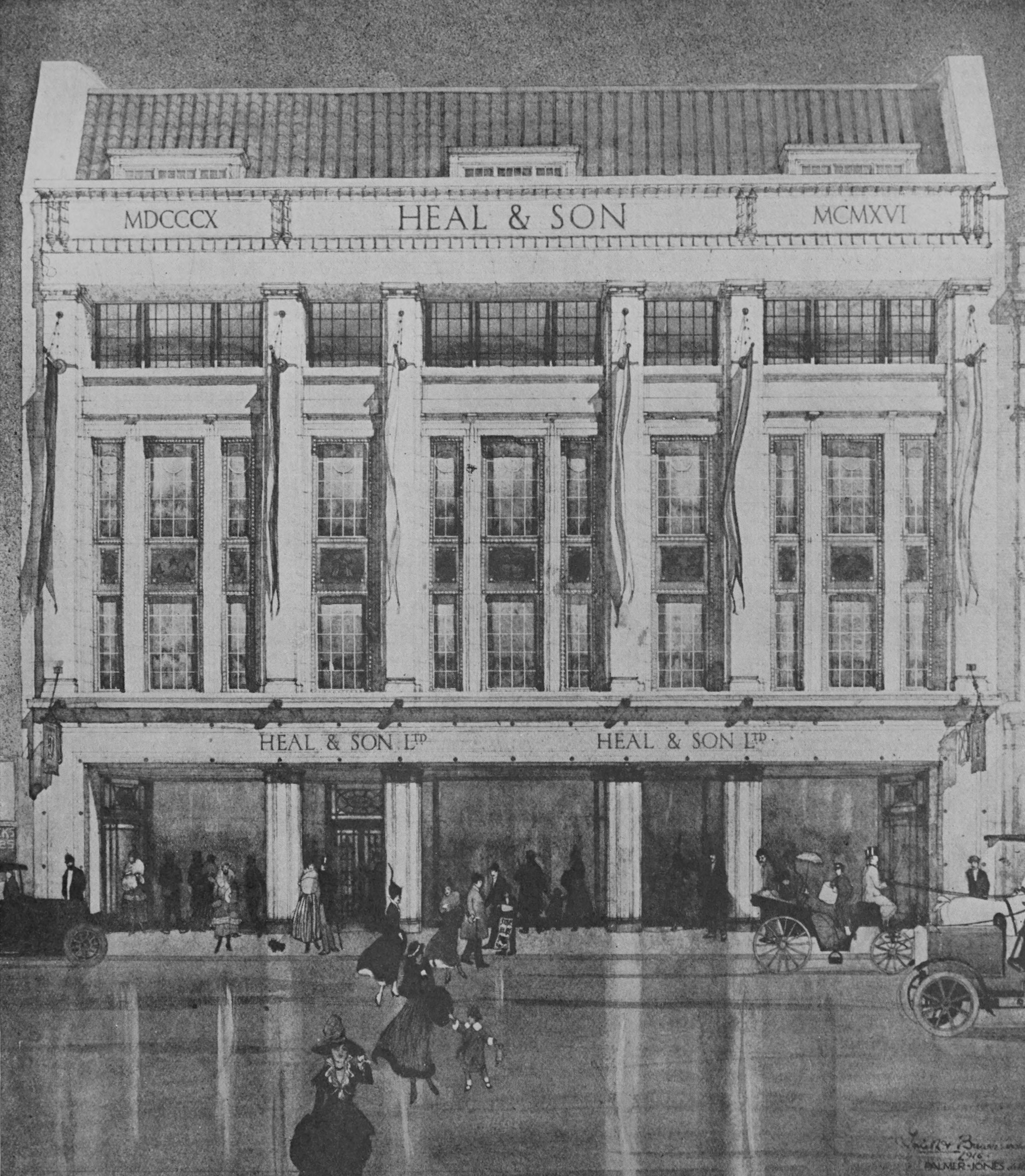
Illustration of the 1916 store on Tottenham Court Road, designed by Smith & Brewer

In 1893, Ambrose Heal Junior joined the family firm. Prior to joining the company firm, Ambrose had trained in fine art at both Marlborough College and the Slade School of Fine Art. He embarked on a two-year apprenticeship with cabinet makers, Plucknett of Warwick, before spending a further six months with furniture retailer Graham and Biddle of Oxford Street. Ambrose designed furniture in the Arts and Crafts style, strongly influenced by Ernest Gimson and Edward Barnsley, but used mechanised production so the style became affordable to the middle classes. The change of style led by Ambrose was different than the company's previous offerings of over ornate furniture and Heal's staff reputedly called it Prison furniture. His first designs were released in the catalogue Plain Oak Furniture in 1898, followed by Simple Bedroom in 1899. The designs were initially built by C.R. Ashbee's Guild and School of Handicraft at Mile End Road, until Heal's established their own cabinet making factory in Albert Mews. The Architectural Review described Heal's furniture as a triumph of craftsmanship. By the end of the nineteenth century it was one of the best-known furniture suppliers in London. Ambrose coined the motto When in doubt, innovate and he commissioned imaginative retailing techniques, such as Gleeson White, the editor of The Studio, the arts and crafts magazine, writing a brochure with illustrations by C. H. B. Quennell called A note on simplicity of design in furniture for bedrooms with special reference to some recently produced by Messrs. Heal & Son to advertise Heal's and its products. The company displayed items of their bedroom furniture at the Paris Exposition of 1900, which was awarded two silver medals, with the same display redisplayed at the 1901 Glasgow Exhibition. Heal's displayed simpler designs for the Letchworth Garden City Cheap Cottages Exhibition in 1905.

In 1905 Ambrose was made joint managing director of the company, with his brother Ralph, the same year that the business was incorporated into a limited company, and in 1906 he joined the Arts and Crafts Exhibition Society, displaying his company's bedroom furniture named after seaside resorts, with Ambrose introducing the four poster bed logo to the firm. Heal's 1905 catalogue Simple Bedroom stated that they aimed to unite the many good qualities of the past with inexpensiveness', producing furniture that would 'come within the means of the modest man, and yet be well-constructed, simple, convenient and entirely satisfying to the senses. One of Heal's customers was George Bernard Shaw, who used Ambrose's design no. 117 bedstead from the Fine Feathers range. In 1910, Ambrose Heal Senior gave his son, Harold, ownership of Staple & Co.

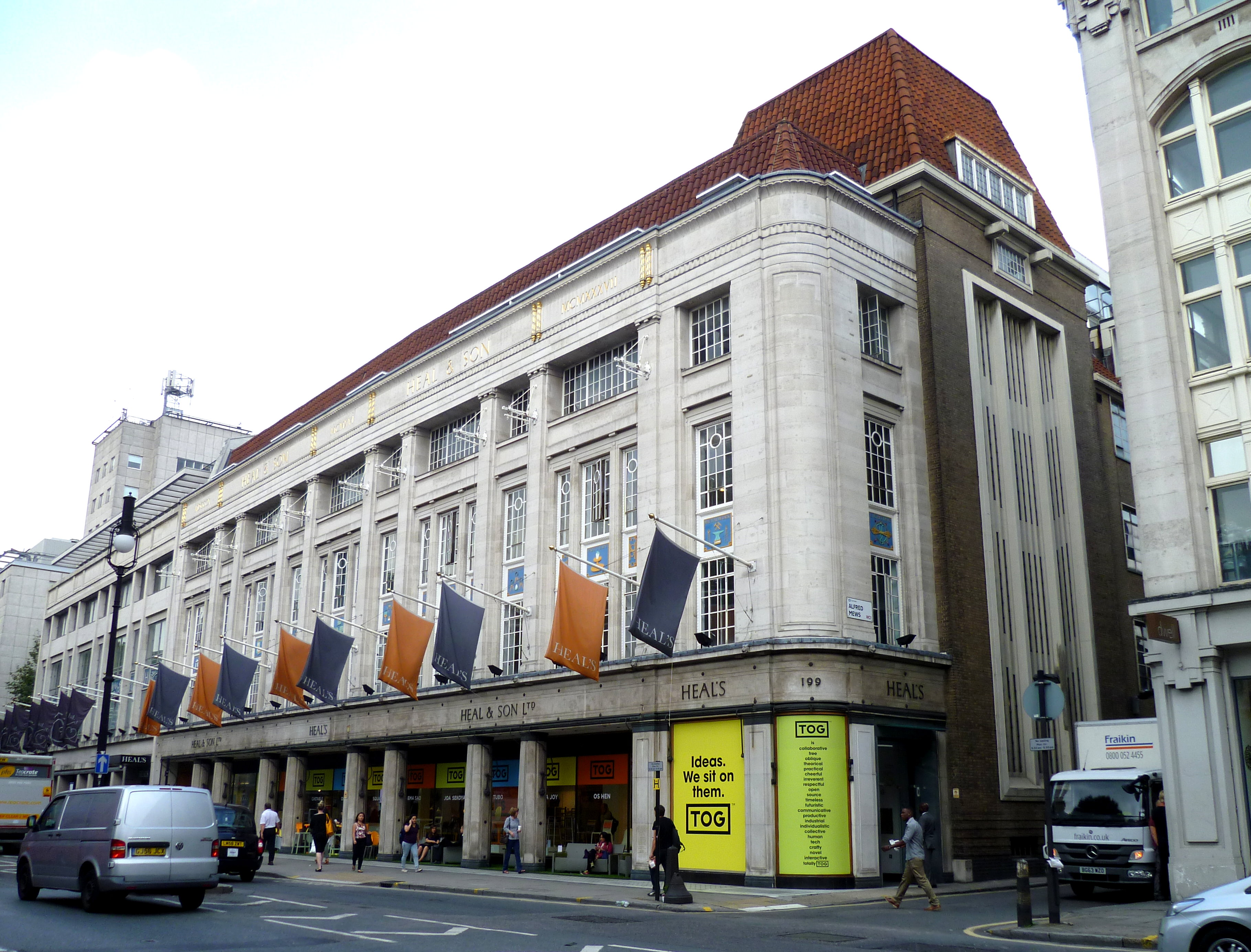
Heal and Son Ltd., Tottenham Court Road.

Ambrose became chairman in 1913 after the death of his father and took over every aspect of the business. Ambrose commissioned his cousin and architect Cecil Claude Brewer in 1914 to design a new store on the central part of the site, which opened in 1917. The new building was colonnaded with large windows to display the company's furniture to passers-by. Heal's signage was designed by Percy Delf Smith, and the Portland stone exterior was decorated with panels advertising bedding, carpets, cabinet makers, and upholsterers created by Joseph Armitage, with the central panel matching the company slogan At the sign of the four poster.

The sign of the four poster on the façade of the Tottenham Court Road store.

Another feature of Brewer's design was a spiral staircase that is still part of the store to this day, providing access across all the retail floors, and the Mansard Gallery, which opened at the top of the building. A new factory was built on the site of the former farmhouse at the rear of the store in Francis Street.

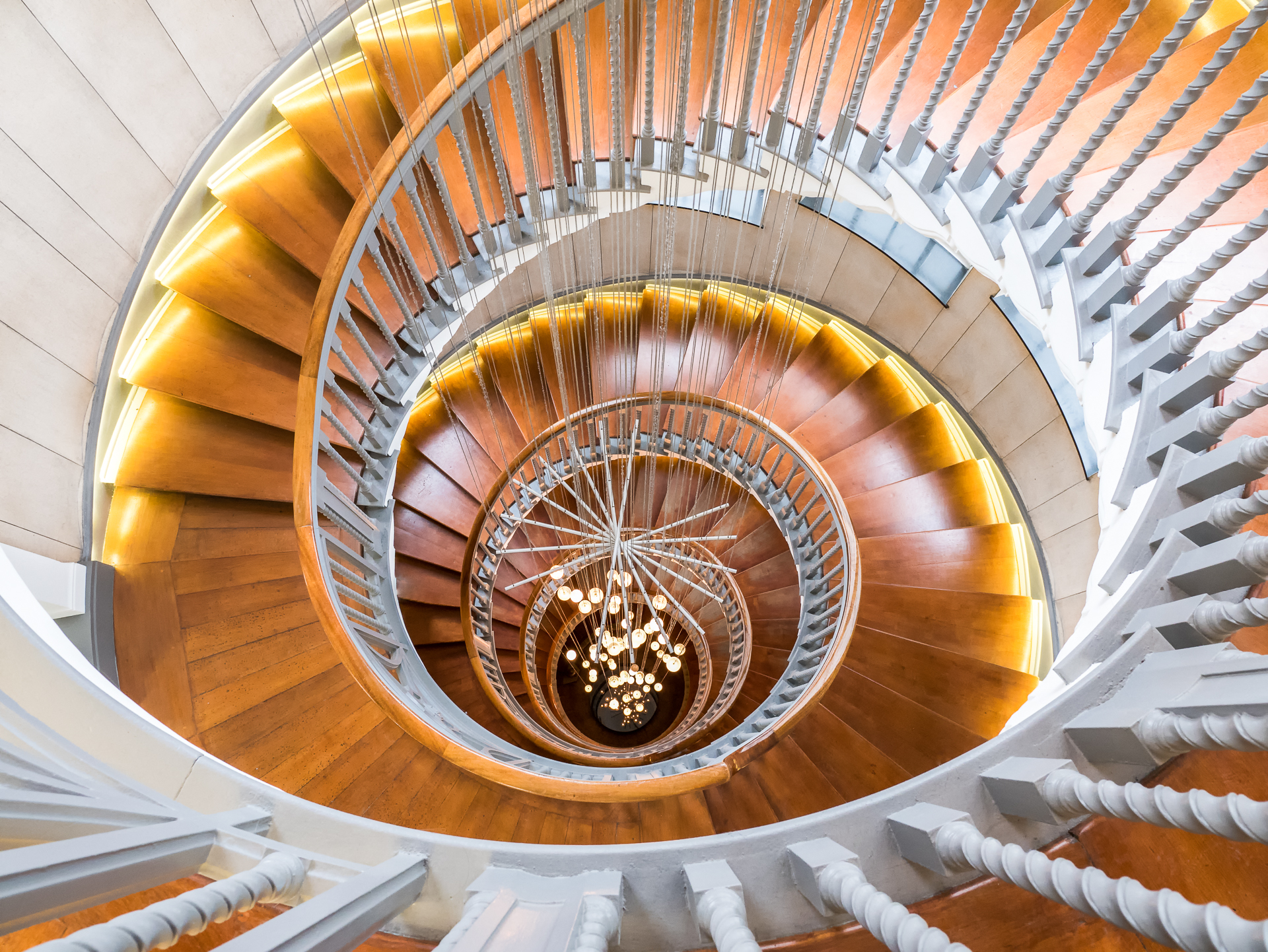
Brewer's spiral staircase

In 1915, Ambrose became a founding member of the Design and Industries Association, with Heal's becoming a showcase for the designs and work of the organisations members. In the same year, Ambrose and sales manager, Hamilton Temple Smith, patented a unit furniture system design, which along with a plan to use former World War I factories to mass-produce bedroom furniture failed to be commercially successful. Ambrose, who had been influenced by Scandinavian design after Heal's had received a commission from the Hotel Standard in Norrkopping, and in 1923 was captivated by Orrefors display at the Goteburg Exhibition, which he soon introduced to English society. This was soon followed by the introduction of Finnish-designed furniture to England by Heal's, including designs by Alvar Aalto, as well as other Scandinavian designs. However Ambrose did also embrace the Art Deco style, designing several pieces in his Signed Edition Series. During 1927, Heal's was given the Royal Warrant from King George V as Makers of Bedsteads and Bedding. Heal's also operated an antiques section, and to promote the business when sales were down, Ambrose held a Victorian exhibition in the Mansard Gallery in 1931, displaying a collection of mid Victorian oddities. This was very against Heal's own style that moved further towards modernism with designs that made use of tubular steel and laminated woods, and included designs by Mies van der Rohe. It was during 1932 that Anthony Standerwick Heal, son of Ambrose, opened the company's new electrical department, having joined the firm in 1929, after serving an apprenticeship with Gordon Russell.

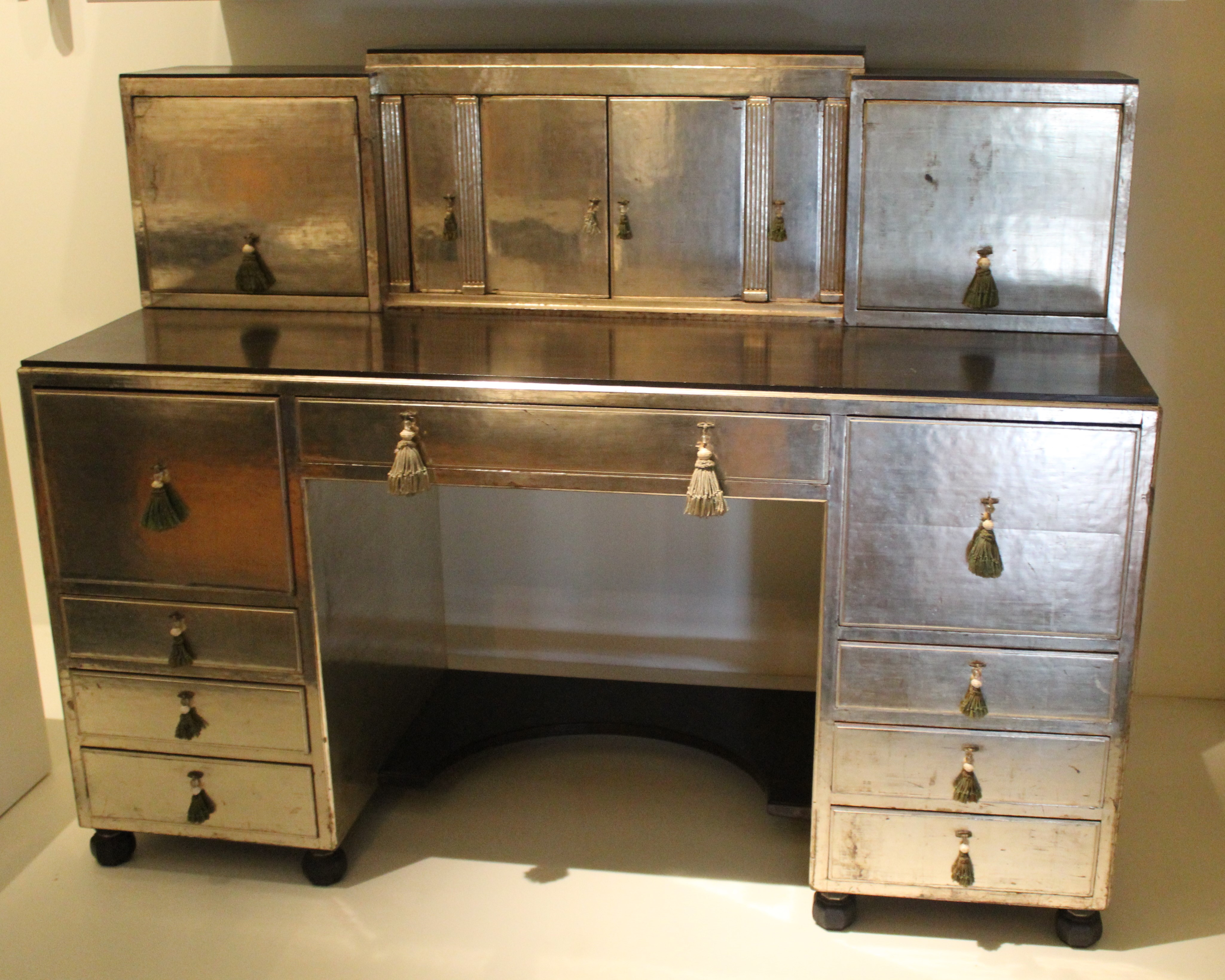
Art Deco desk designed by Edward Maufe for Heal's

Due to the financial downturn in the 1930s, Heal's finances were struggling, with staff asked to take a pay cut, and introduced a range of economy furniture, with Ambrose investing in a nationwide promotional campaign called Heal's Economy Furniture for 1932 and All That, that was manufactured for them by Greenings of Oxford. In 1933, Ambrose was knighted, and a year later his youngest son, J. Christopher Heal, joined the firm. He would follow his father in designing both furniture and textiles, and was one of the seven architects at Heal's modernist exhibition Contemporary Furniture by Seven Architects in 1937 (which included the work of Bauhaus Professor Marcel Breuer), and designed a bedroom suite for the Paris Exhibition in the same year. During the same year, the architect Edward Maufe, whose wife Prudence worked for Heal's and was a lover of Ambrose, extended Brewer's frontage to 197-199 Tottenham Court Road, and added a Lenscrete vertical window, inspired by his design for Guildford Cathedral. The previous year had seen Anthony made managing director.

=== World War II and the 1950s ===
During World War II, Heal's factory workers at first made beds and pillows for the armed forces, before moving to producing parachutes, which would lead to Heal's launching textiles after the war. The production area was so tight that to meet the demand, Heal's expanded production of the parachutes into the showroom space and Heal's created Heal Contracts Ltd in 1944 to manage the contract. In 1941, Heal's started Heal's Wholesale and Export Ltd to export all of Heal's merchandise. The company continued to manufacture furniture during the war, under the British government's Utility controls, but the designs were controlled by the Utility Design Panel, led by Gordon Russell. The company made its first purchase of another firm in 1944, buying the small building and decorating firm of George Coulter.

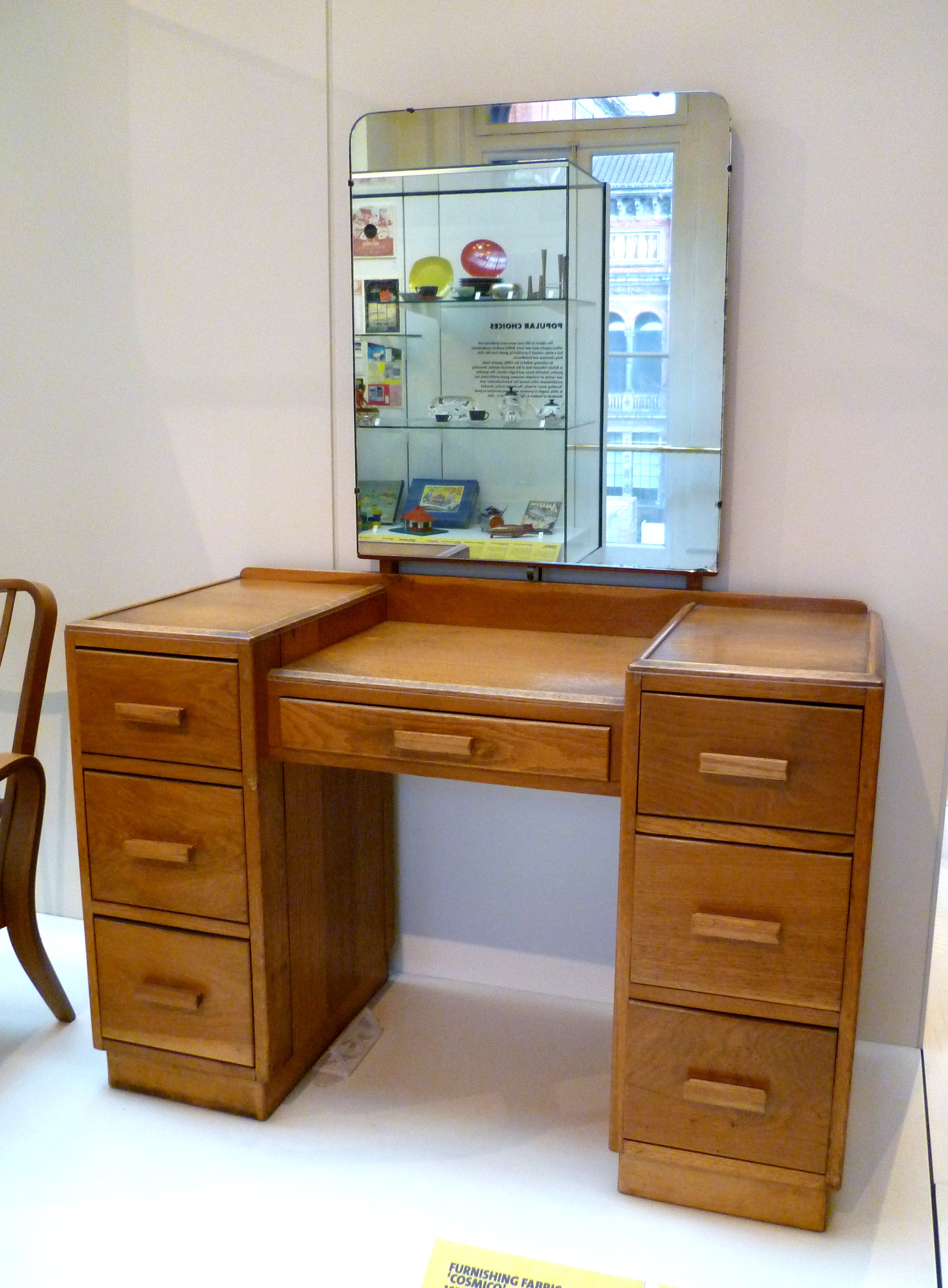
A dressing table designed by the Utility Design Panel c. 1943. Made by Heal & Son, 1947. Oak.

After the war, Heal's had a significant presence at the Britain Can Make It exhibition at the Victoria and Albert Museum in 1946, commissioning designers like Alix Stone and pottery firm AE Gray & Co to produce pieces to be displayed. In the same year, Heal's Contracts moved away from war contracts and into the furnishing contracts business. The company backed Clive Latimer and Robin Day's involvement in the 1948 International Competition for Low-Cost Furniture held by the Museum of Modern Art in New York, where they won first prize for the sole storage unit. During the same year, Tom Worthington took charge of Heal's Wholesale and Export and started to develop the textile side of the business, where Heal's purchased the cloth, selected the designs and then employed printers to produce the finished article. In 1949, the Utility controls were amended so Heal's could design and manufacture their own furniture, but under the rules set out, it had to be sold at a set price and so had to be produced in larger numbers than Heal's would normally have done. Heal's also presented at the 1951 Festival of Britain, with plywood and moulded furniture designs by J. Christopher, several designs from the newly formed textile department and pottery from artists such as Australian contemporaries David Boyd and Hermia Boyd. However, its biggest contribution was manufacturing 900 perforated steel sheet and steel rod stackable chairs by the designer Andrew John Milne that were used as terrace seating. Heal's itself hosted an exhibition, Scandinavian Design for Living in the same year, the first time the term had been used.

The Utility controls were dropped by the British government in 1952, and a year later, Sir Ambrose retired, with Anthony replacing his father as chairman and J. Christopher as design director. Heal's after the war expanded into textiles, using their experiences gained from World War II, with young designers compositions selected by both Tom Worthington and J. Christopher. This included Lucienne Day, whose Calyx design of 1951 won a prize at the 1951 Milan Triennale and from the American Institute of Decorators, while other prominent designers were Helen Close, Jane Edgar, Dorothy Lupton, Michael O'Connell, Helen Sampson and Margaret Simeon. Day would go on and regularly create patterns for Heal's throughout the 50s and 60s.

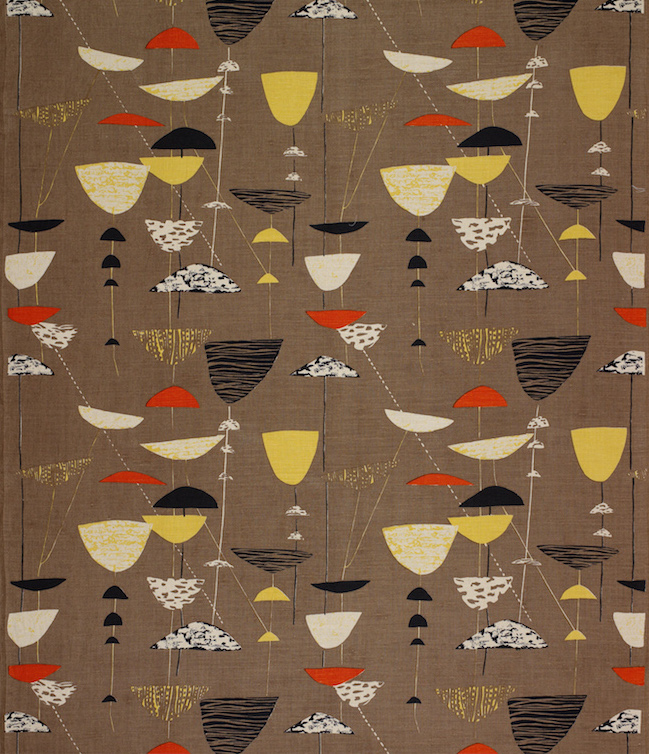
Calyx screen-printed furnishing fabric, Lucienne Day, Heal's Wholesale & Export, 1951

Michael O'Connell had produced patterns for Heal's after meeting J. Christopher, who recalled:

it was the first time I had met a craftsman (O'Connell) who could handle vat dyes producing fabrics in colours that would not fade. The designs were striking, of a kind unlike any I had seen. I quickly decided to buy some and hold a small exhibition of Michael's work in the Fabric Dept; so began a long lasting friendship.'

After the Festival, Heal's greatly expanded their pottery offerings with designs by artists such as Lucie Rie and Hans Coper and selling Scandinavian glass by companies such as Holmegaard. In the world of furniture, Heal's invested in Clive Latimer's Plymet furniture range, and as well as promoting Scandinavian furniture, they retailed modernist pieces designed by British artists such as Robert Heritage and Robin Day. The company expanded in 1955 by the purchase of architectural joiners, J. L. Green & Vardy, who were based in Essex Road, Islington. A year later, Heal's own cabinet making factory was moved from Tottenham Court Road to share premises in Islington. With Heal's Wholesale and Export Ltd being mainly involved in the textile business, the company name was changed in 1958 to Heal's Fabrics Ltd. In 1959, a further subsidiary, Carpet Layers Ltd, was formed to move into the furnishing fittings business, and Anthony Heal was selected as Master of the Worshipful Company of Furniture Makers. The company ended the decade being awarded the Royal Warrant by Queen Elizabeth II.

=== From 60s growth, 70s struggles to family departure ===
At the start of the decade, Heal's store had 21 departments, which were organised into three different management groups – furniture, soft furnishings, and domestic equipment. However, the company's senior bed maker, Percy Brierly, retired after 53 years of service. In the early 1960s, Heal's surveyed their customers to understand their buying habits, which was used to influence the layout of the store after it was extended in 1962. The extension, designed by Herbert Fitzroy Robinson, was built with a steel frame faced in Portland stone with seven bays in an interrelated style to Brewer's original design, with ceramic blue and cream relief panels designed by John Farleigh and made by Kenneth Clark, depicting wares sold by the store and interspersed with large letters "H" for Heals. With the extension the store frontage stretched between Torrington Place and Alfred Mews. At the start of the 1960s the company launched the Can't-wait-to-get-it-home advertising campaign. In the same year, Heal's Contracts opened a new office in Edgbaston as the volume of furniture contract work expanded in the Midlands. The financial success of Heal's, which had seen turnover doubled, allowed them to grow further in 1964, first by purchasing a 50% share in H.G. Dunn's of Bromley, a furniture retailer after its owner, Geoffrey Edward Dunn invited the approach as he had no family to carry on the business. The company's German importer for Heal's Fabrics retired in the same year, and Heal's purchased his business in Stuttgart and renamed it Heal Textil GmbH. In the same year Anthony was awarded the Royal Society of Arts Bi-Centenary Medal to recognise the considerable influence you have exercised in many fields of design.

In 1965, Heal & Son was awarded, in its inaugural year, the Royal Society of Arts Presidential Awards for Design Management. By this time, Heal's design office was working separately from the store, producing designs for both Heal's Contracts and the store, which sold more products from the design office's competitors. The store by this time had three stock lines: those designed and made by Heal's, those commissioned by Heal's just for their store, and the third line being items that could be found in rival retailers. The commissioned designs included furniture by John and Sylvia Reid, Nigel Walters and Martin Grierson; toys by Kristin Baybars and John Gould; textiles by Colleen Fan, Howard Carter, Barbara Brown and Doreen Dyall; and silverware by Robert Welch. The company had set up the CONT/ex team in 1960, led by Gilbert Rabjohn to sell continental designed and manufactured furniture, such as Yngve Ekström's Kurva chairs, and by 1965 had moved into the wholesaling business, selling the furniture onto other British retailers. In 1966, J. L. Green & Vardy and the CONT/ex department were merged and renamed as Heal's Furniture.

The business created a holding firm, Heal & Son Holdings Ltd in 1968 to oversee all the subsidiaries, while Heal & Son was incorporated to manage the retail side of the business. During 1969, the company further expanded by purchasing John Bowles & Co. of Brighton, in what was termed a merger, which saw Bowles move to new premises at 143 North Street and expand its range to include lighting, pottery, glass, cutlery and linen. Heal's Contracts was expanded and moved from their Edgbaston office into a larger site in central Birmingham. Anthony was recognised by the Finnish Government in 1970 for his promotion of Finnish products when he was awarded the Order of the White Rose of Finland. In 1971, Carpet Layers moved to a new workshop in Haringey, being renamed Carpet Layers and Curtain Makers Ltd to reflect the subsidiary's expansion, but the company lost Tom Worthington, who retired being replaced by D S Neill. Further expansion occurred in 1972, when a new store was opened in Guildford. The company's finances however started struggling by the mid 70s because of the oil crisis. Profits of £616,000 had been recorded in 1972, but this fell to £552,000 in 1973, and lead to a far larger drop of £292,000 in 1974. The company closed Bowles of Brighton in 1975, but Heal's Contracts opened offices for a short time in Glasgow and Dubai. In 1976, the company purchased the remaining 50% share holding in H.G. Dunn of Bromley upon Geoffrey Dunn's retirement, later renaming the store Heal's of Bromley, and purchased selected assets of cabinet makers, Archie Shine Ltd.

To try and entice customers from younger rivals such as Habitat, during 1978 Heal's launched the lower priced Buzz range, but Heal's Fabrics was struggling to find its identity in the changing design world. Heal's worries however continued losing £200,000, and the Islington factory of Heal's Furniture was closed in 1979, with a small cabinet making unit opening back at Tottenham Court Road. In May 1980, Heal's reported that turnover was at £11.34 million but they had lost a smaller amount at £192,000, with the retail sale profits not helping against the disappointing performance of Heal's Contracts. In 1980, Anthony retired as chairman and was replaced by his son Oliver, who tried to recapture Heal's past by staging the Classics exhibition in 1981. Oliver had said at the 1980 AGM that Heal's had "sacrificed its clarity of image in an unavailable short term search for volume sales". The Bromley store was closed in the same year.

=== The arrival of Conran ===
In 1983, the Heal family decided to sell the business as they could not sustain the losses, and contacted Terence Conran, who, although the boss of rival Habitat, they had a good relationship with. Conran had displayed pottery at an exhibition in the Mansard Gallery as a schoolboy and had sold his designs in the store. The full stock of the company was purchased for £4.8 million by Habitat, who had merged with Mothercare in 1982. Conran had been inspired by Heal's as a regular visitor as a child with his mother Christina, and believed that not only could he turn Heal's fortunes around, he believed that they complemented Habitat, in that Habitat was for younger customers, Heal's would become the mature person's Habitat. Former buying director at Habitat, Geoff Davey was appointed as managing director at Heal's. Conran implemented a fast-paced reorganisation plan as he wanted to celebrate Habitat's 20th anniversary in the following year. The cabinet making unit was closed in 1983, with the bedding factory being moved out of Tottenham Court Road to Islington, and Buzz ended as it clashed with Habitat's own ranges. Heal's Fabrics were merged into the newly formed Heal's Products Division in 1984, ending their own fabric collections. The building was made into Habitat Mothercare's new headquarters, with the 1962 extension becoming Habitat's new lead store, with a branch of NOW, the men's clothing retailer and Mothercare included, with Heal's downsized. The Mansard Gallery was shut, to allow for the upper floors to be converted into the groups offices and design studio space. A poster, based on a 1928 Heal's advertisement by R. P. Gossip, was created by Conran Design group artist Helen Senior to advertise the newly redeveloped store. Conran himself updated the Heals four poster emblem, and Susan Goodden was commissioned to write a history of Heal's. Conran reopened in Heal's an outdoor furniture showroom and included an updated version of a Sir Ambrose Heal bench design.

In 1986, the concave bay windows that had been installed in 1936, were removed from the Brewer/Maufe parts of the building, which provoked the wrath of the Thirties Society. Parent company Habitat Mothercare merged with British Home Stores to create Storehouse plc in the same year. In 1988, Storehouse opened new Heal's stores in Reading, Lakeside, Kingston upon Thames and Croydon. Storehouse however had a chequered existence, making a £114.9 million pre-tax profit in 1987–88, but in the following year this had fallen to just £11.3 million, a 90% drop. Heal's range during the later days of Storehouse ownership was seen as being of a bland personality. In 1989, the furnishing division of Storehouse, which included Heal's and Habitat, lost £10 million, so early in 1990, they closed Heal's stores in Reading, Lakeside, Kingston upon Thames, and Croydon, at a cost of £3 million.

=== Management buyout ===
In 1990, five members of the senior management team at Heal's, led by Colin Pilgrim, purchased the business from Storehouse, each paying £115,000 each to acquire the business, with a further £1 million investment from Natwest Ventures, after Storehouse decided to concentrate on core businesses. In the same year, Heal's lost their Royal Warrant. During 1991, a combined catering contract was signed by Heal's and Storehouse with Catering & Allied Services, a UK first, to manage both organisations' restaurants at Tottenham Court Road. By 1995, the company had been turned around with sales increased by 20% over two years and had announced profits of £1.2 million, with the company changing their ranges into more eclectic styles from the bland offerings offered by Storehouse at the end of their ownership. Managing director Colin Pilgrim announced plans to expand with new branches, with the first open on 1 December in King's Road, Chelsea, which had been designed by Virgile & Stone. In the same year Heal's won a Wooden Pencil award at the D&AD Awards. In 1996, Heal's made a £1.75 million profit on a turnover of £19.6 million, further evidence of their recovery.

The company was listed on the London Stock Exchange with a valuation of £15 million in 1997, but by the end of the year, the company had not announced any further store openings, which Colin Pilgrim had promised in the pre-flotation plan, and had seen the share price fall 27% below its listing. This was rectified in 1998 with the opening of a fourth store, by returning to Kingston Upon Thames where they had previously had a store under Storehouse's ownership. The new store had helped the company record profits of £2.59 million, and Colin Pilgrim announced in 1999 that they were still planning to open stores nationwide. In 2000, Heal's launched their own website, but speculation of a takeover bid was circulating after corporate raiders Brian Myerson and Julian Treger purchased an 18% shareholding in Heal's with financiers stating the share price undervalued the business. The company announced pre-tax profits of £4.3 million on a turnover of £33.7 million for 2000–01, however in June 2001, directors announced they were reviewing their strategic options including a possible sale of the business as the share price wasn't reflective of the company's true value.

=== Acquisition by Wittington Investments ===
On 16 August 2001, the Weston family owned Wittington Investments acquired Heal's plc, reverting it to a private company with a bid of 272p per share, which was a 33% uplift on Heal's share price at the time of the sale and valuing the company at £33 million. The first expansion under the new owners came in 2003 when a new store was opened in New Cathedral Street, Manchester, while a further store was added at Redbrick Mills in Batley, Leeds in 2005. During 2004, Heal's launched the Heal's Discovers Programme, which helps emerging designers to showcase their creativity, whilst experiencing first-hand the process of creating great design for the home. In 2007 a new store was opened with a return to Brighton, but the company announced losses of £3.5 million for 2006–07, its fourth consecutive year of losses, but an improvement on the previous years £4.5 million loss. Wittington Investments sold 20% of the store to the company's management team as part of an incentive scheme to improve the company's performance. In 2010, it was announced that the Manchester store would be closing due to poor sales. In 2014, the business relaunched Heal's own fabric collection. However, the company was losing money, with a loss of £10.7 million for 2014–15, though sales had grown by 9%. As part of a strategic management review, the King's Road, Chelsea and Guildford stores were closed down, though a new concept digital store opened in Westbourne Grove.

The company opened a new store in the Mailbox Birmingham during 2017, and although its main store at Tottenham Court Road was downsized by renting concession space, the company's losses had fallen to £3.9 million for 2016-17 and sales had risen by 4%. The following year, Heal's opened a new store at Westfield London and a clearance outlet in Cobham, but closed the Westbourne Grove store without much fanfare. The company in 2020 reported a loss in 2019-2020 for £2.5 million, but a year later, even though the stores were closed because of the pandemic, sales had increased by 28% and they had made a profit of £2.1 million. In 2021, the Birmingham store closed after the landlords at the Mailbox decided to redevelop the ground floor into office space, but a new concession space was opened inside Fenwick's Newcastle upon Tyne store, and a new outlet store was opened in Walton-on-Thames, which replaced the former Cobham store. It was reported that the Weston family had been looking for a buyer for Heal's, but after a failed management buyout and with profits returning, the Weston family decided to keep the business. During 2022, Heal's extended their concession stores by opening units within Fenwick's Canterbury and York stores, and returned to the King's Road for a third time with a new outlet store replacing the Walton-on-Thames store. The company had to close its Brighton store after the landlord would not renew its lease, and announced that there had been a drop off in sales and profits, with the company earning £1.4 million in pre-tax profits. A further reduction in profits was reported in 2022–23, dropping to £800,000, though sales remained similar, and Wittington Investments reported that the profit margin had been hit by inflation on both goods and wages. During 2023 the new look Tottenham Court Road store opened after a major refurbishment of the site by joint owners KKR and General Projects, which saw the company now move back into the 1962 extension lost to Habitat back in the 80s. The new look store operates on the ground floor and the basement, with a new feature staircase added to link the two, designed by Matthew Hilton. However the King's Road outlet was closed. In November 2024, Heal's opened a new store at Bicester Avenue garden centre, but had announced for the year ending 14 September that sales and profits were again down, with sales down 6.9% at £34.8 million making a pre-tax profit of just £71,000, following from the previous years £500,000.

== Heal & Son commissioned work and Heal's Contracts ==
Under Ambrose's management, Heal & Son were commissioned to produce furniture for a variety of companies and individuals. These included:

- Bedroom furniture for the Standard Hotel, Norrkoping in 1899.
- Council chamber furniture for Reigate Town Hall in 1901.
- Boardroom furniture for Vickers Maxim in 1911.
- Tables for Winston Churchill's home, Chartwell in 1924.
- Tables for St John's College, Cambridge in 1930.

After World War II, Heal's Contracts moved into providing commissioned designs, furnishings, and building work to a variety of customers. Their work included:

- Council chamber for the TUC.
- Boardroom and directors offices at Castrol House.
- Executive suite at the Vickers building.
- Council chamber at Ebbw Vale Urban District
- Ceylon Tea Centre, Birmingham
- Ballroom for Warwickshire County Cricket Club.
- Interiors and furniture for Halifax Building Society
- Furniture for the council chamber of the Institution of Gas Engineers.
- Interiors on board the ship's SS Northern Star, RMS Empress of Canada, SS Canberra, MV Kungsholm and the Queen Elizabeth 2.

== Heal's Fabrics ==
Heal's Fabrics rose to prominence in the 1950s and 60s under the leadership of Tom Worthington. Worthington and his assistant Jenni Allen would pick around 80 designs from around 12,000 submissions, with Worthington using his contacts in the art world to attract the best young talent. The company worked with over 80 designers alone during the 1960s, with Lucienne Day and Barbara Brown amongst the most prolific. When Allen left Heal's, Evelyn Redgrave, who had designed patterns for Heal's, including Cascade and Stipple, became Worthington's assistant and would go on and become a director at the firm until she left in 1977 to set up her own textile company. In 1968, Worthington reflected on Heal's style, "It may take a year or longer for a really advanced design to start selling itself. And sometimes an avant-garde design – although not selling itself – can gain so much publicity it will help create a market for similar designs". In her book Twentieth Century Pattern Design: Textile & Wallpaper Pioneers, Lesley Jackson states,

No company has since come near to equalling the achievements of Heal's Fabrics in the field of modern printed pattern design.

Heal's Fabrics are represented in the collections of the Victoria and Albert Museum; Philadelphia Museum of Art; Cooper Hewitt, Smithsonian Design Museum, Minneapolis Institute of Art, and the Art Institute of Chicago. Heal's Fabrics collection returned in 2014, with designs by a mixture of emerging and established designers, including the return of Zandra Rhodes with a new take on her 1963 pattern Top Brass.

=== Selected prints ===
- 1947 – Jane Edgar Aspidestia
- 1947 – Helen Close Athenian
- 1955 – Paul Gell Palladio
- 1955 – Lucienne Day Isosceles
- 1956 – Willy Hermann Cirrus
- 1956 – David Parsons Kite Strings
- 1956 – Edward Pond Farnborough
- 1956 – Mary Warren Nautilus
- 1957 – Michael O'Connell Syncromesh
- 1957 – Mary Moran Daffodils
- 1958 – Ellen Fricke Furrow
- 1958 – Dorothy Carr Oak
- 1958 – Jane Daniels Sargasso
- 1959 – Harold Cohen Vineyard
- 1959 – Fay Hillier Festoon
- 1959 – Barbara Brown – Sweet Briar
- 1960 – Ruth Kaye Crusilly
- 1960 – Sigfrid Fettel Patio
- 1961 – Colin Lacey Solitaire
- 1961 – Barbara Brown Symmetry
- 1962 – Althea McNish Caribe
- 1962 – Howard Carter Sunflowers
- 1962 – Doreen Dyall Doll's House
- 1963 – John Plumb Chiricahua
- 1963 – Doreen Dyall Formation
- 1964 – Regina Moritz-Ever Rosette
- 1964 – Zandra Rhodes Gala
- 1964 – Ada Charniak Structure
- 1965 – Peter Hall Verdure
- 1965 – Evelyn Brooks Impact
- 1965 – Wolfgang Bauer Summer Pride
- 1966 – Arno Thoner Rotation
- 1966 – Henrietta Coster Perspective
- 1969 – Barbara Brown Frequency
- 1969 – Catherine Netherwood Concentric
- 1969 – Hamdi El Attar Lariat
- 1970 – Barbara Brown Automation
- 1971 – Heather Brown Alhambra
- 1971 – Barbara Brown Ikebana
- 1972 – Gabrielle Fountain Equilibrum
- 1972 – Mary Oliver Kew
- 1973 – Adrianne Morag-Ferguson Glentanna
- 1973 – Jyoti Bhomik Scintilla
- 1973 – Peter Phillips Spectroscope
- 1974 – Peter McCulloch Aureola
- 1974 – Jack Prince Playtime
- 1976 – Karen MacDonald Fuchsia
- 1976 – Jennie Foley Country Walk
- 1977 – Natalie Gibson Nectar
- 1977 – Annabel Ralph's Maze
- 1981 – Leslee Wills Zeme

== The Mansard Gallery ==
The gallery, on the fourth floor at Tottenham Court Road, was opened in 1917 with a display entitled, Poster Pictures, an exhibition curated by Ambrose's friend, Frank Pick, as Ambrose wanted to promote the work of commercial artists. One of the artists selected, Edward McKnight Kauffer, would produce a poster later in the year for The London Group's exhibition at the Gallery. The London Group would go onto hold a number of exhibitions at the Mansard Gallery during the 20s. At one exhibition in 1922, the London Group showed their sense of humour, when the information in the catalogue for the portrait of Harriet Cohen, by Savo Popovitch was priced at £150, including frame, but without frame would cost eightpence. The gallery was run by Prudence Maufe, the wife of architect Edward Maufe and one of Ambrose's lovers. The most influential exhibition was the Exhibition of French Art 1914-1919. The exhibition held in 1919 had been organised by brothers Osbert Sitwell and Sacheverell Sitwell and art dealer Léopold Zborowski. The exhibition was the first display of works in Britain by Pablo Picasso, Henri Matisse and Amedeo Modigliani, and included paintings by André Derain, Othon Friesz, Maurice de Vlaminck, Fernand Léger, Léopold Survage, Louis Marcoussis and André Lhote amongst others. In his article Modern French Art at the Mansard Gallery in The Athenaeum, art critic Roger Fry wrote "what an extraordinary variety of presentments, what innumerable different visions, one can enjoy in this gallery!", though a critic in The Times labelled the exhibition "ghastly". A year later Wyndham Lewis curated the Group X show, an attempt to revive the Vorticist movement, and include work by Jessica Dismorr, Frank Dibson, Frederick Etchells, Charles Ginner, Cuthbert Hamilton, Edward McKnight Kauffer, William Roberts, John Turnbull and Edward Wadsworth.

Poster for the Group X exhibition, 1920

The Bloomsbury Group were regular visitors as the Mansard Gallery quickly established itself as one of the meeting places for London's, if not Britain's, avant-garde scene. The Friday Group regularly put on shows at the Gallery, hosting their final exhibition in 1922, and it was the location where Aldous Huxley first meet Virginia Woolf. In 1939, Evelyn Waugh expressed his distaste of Heal's modernist exhibitions in his story Work Suspended. Other exhibits at the Gallery included Claud Lovat Fraser, Fifteen Cornish Artists in 1951, Markey Robinson, Kathleen Caddick, Ben Enwonwu and the Junior Art Workers Guild. The female artist Mary Fedden hosted her first exhibition at the gallery in 1947, and returned with a major exhibition in 1967. In the 60s, the Australian Alannah Coleman was appointed director of the Gallery and exhibitions were held by artists including Ron Russell and Bill Newcombe.

The Mansard Gallery was also used by Heal's to promote their products by utilising the exhibitionary complex, to sell by not selling or advertise by not advertising. These included the Modern Tendencies series, A Country Home Exhibition and Contemporary Furniture from Seven Architects. In 1960, to celebrate Heal's 150th anniversary, the Mansard Gallery held the Designers of The Future Exhibition, where young designers from seven countries designed furniture, which was the made and sold by Heal's. The Mansard Gallery closed in 1983 with the redevelopment of the building by Terence Conran, but under Wittington Investments ownership, Heal's launched a short-lived version of the gallery on the first floor at Tottenham Court Road, with the graphic identity re-imagined by David Barrington. The first exhibition by artist Chila Kumari Singh Burman entitled Neon Drama and Pearl Drops opened on the 15 February 2022.

== Heal's at Exhibitions ==
Heal's have been a regular displayer of their wares at exhibitions organised nationally and internationally. Heal's displayed an eider-down quilt with embroidered satin covering at the 1851 Great Exhibition, which was followed by Louis XVI style bedroom designed by J. Braune at the 1862 International Exhibition. Heal's won a silver medal for Sir Ambrose Heal's bedroom display at the 1900 Paris Exposition, with Heal's returning to Paris in 1925 and 1937. They also attended Glasgow in 1901, Ghent in 1913 and Christchurch in 1906. The company started displaying at the Arts and Crafts Exhibition Society from 1899 until 1938, and were a regular attendee at the Ideal Home Exhibition. After the war, Heal's commissioned designs were chosen to be displayed at the 1946 Britain Can Make It exhibition at the Victoria and Albert Museum, and the 1951 Festival of Britain. Heal's is a regular contributor at London Design Festival, and in 2023 hosted An Exhibition Of Two Halves, where it hosted an exhibit of 70 chairs of the last 70 years, and an exhibition of third-year students' work from Kingston University's Furniture & Product Design course.

== Dodie Smith and The Heal's Cat ==
Dodie Smith, the author known for works such as The Hundred and One Dalmatians, joined Heal's in 1923 to run their toy department after her acting career failed. She would go on to have an affair with Ambrose, and was reportedly not of the temperament required for the job, with reports that on one occasion she flung one of the shop assistants across the china department. Another incident was the sale of the Heal's bronze cat, that sits at the top of the spiral staircase. The bronze sculpture was made by Chassagne, the French sculptor, and had been bought in 1925 by Ambrose. The cat was sold by Smith for £40 to a Heal's customer, but Ambrose wrote to the customer retracting the sale, with a card saying Heal's mascot. Not for sale was placed next to the sculpture. In 2016, to celebrate 100 years of Cecil Brewer's spiral staircase, Heal's commissioned ten designers (Orla Kiely, Ikuko Iwamoto, Donna Wilson, Louise Lockhart, Rachel Cave, Mia Sarosi, Cressida Bell, Sunny Todd, Squint and Zoe Bradley) to produce a modern interpretation of the famous cat. Unlike the real one, these were sold at an auction held at the store to raise money for Great Ormond Street Hospital.
