= Storehouse plc =

Former British retailing group (1986-2000)

- Trade name: Storehouse
- Company type: Public company
- Traded as: LSE: SH
- Industry: Retail
- Founded: 1986
- Defunct: 2000
- Fate: Renamed
- Successor: Mothercare
- Headquarters: London, UK

Storehouse plc, traded as Storehouse, was a large UK retail business formed by Terence Conran through the merger of various high street chains. It was listed on the London Stock Exchange and was a constituent of the FTSE 100 Index until it was reduced in size and renamed Mothercare in 2000.

== History ==
The company was formed in 1986 by the merger of Habitat Mothercare PLC with British Home Stores PLC. The shareholders of BHS held 55% of the resulting company, and Habitat Mothercare shareholders the remaining 45%. The company's brands included British Home Stores (including their 50% stake in SavaCentre), Habitat, Conran's, Conran Design Group, Conran Studios, Mothercare (including Habitat Mothercare's 20% stake in Fnac and 50% stake in Conran Octopus Publishing), Richard Shops, NOW, Heal's, and The Conran Shop.

1987 saw the group start to expand with the establishment of the Anonymous retail chain, and the launch of Storecard, the firm's in-house credit card (in association with Citibank). Speculation in the City that Storehouse was worth less as a whole than the sum of its parts began to circulate during 1987, and culminated in an offer by the property company Mountleigh in September 1987 which valued the company at £1.8 billion. This was dismissed and quickly followed a bid from a small engineering firm valued at £45 million – Benlox Holdings plc – which was used as a vehicle by financier Peter Earl, valuing Storehouse at £2.007 billion. This too was rejected. Storehouse made a £114.9 million pre-tax profit in 1987–88, but in the following year profits fell 90% to £11.3 million.

In 1988 Storehouse appointed a new chief executive, Michael Julien, a former managing director (finance and administration) of Guinness plc, to replace Terence Conran who remained as chairman until 1990. The group was then reorganised into three divisions: British Home Stores; 'Speciality Retailing' comprising the group's brands Mothercare, Richard Shops, Blazer, Anonymous and Jacadi; and 'Home Furnishing' comprising Habitat, Heals, and The Conran Shop. Julien retired on health grounds in 1992 and was replaced by David Dworkin, chief executive of British Home Stores.

In 1992 Habitat was purchased from Storehouse by Ikano, and Richard Shops was sold to the British retailing giant Sears plc.

Storehouse bought Children's World from Boots in 1996, and rebranded all of their superstores as Mothercare World.

In 2000, following several years of tough trading for all companies within the group, British Home Stores was sold to Philip Green for £200m cash. Storehouse then changed its name to Mothercare plc.
