= SavaCentre =

Former British chain of 13 hypermarkets

- Founded: 1977
- Defunct: 2005
- Owner: Sainsbury's (50:50 joint venture with BHS (1977–89))

SavaCentre was a chain of 13 hypermarkets and later a further seven discount supermarkets owned and operated jointly by Sainsbury's and BHS, beginning in 1977. Sainsbury's later took full control of the stores alone in 1989, rebranding them as Sainsbury's SavaCentre, until 2005 when the stores were integrated into the Sainsbury's supermarket brand. The hypermarket stores ranged in size from 66,000 sq ft (6,100 m^{2}) to 117,000 sq ft (10,900 m^{2}) and the discount supermarkets ranged in size from 31,000 sq ft (2,900 m^{2}) to 70,000 sq ft (6,500 m^{2}). At the time of its inception, it was the only dedicated hypermarket chain in the UK.

== History ==
=== The initial idea ===
In the 1970s, the then chairman and chief executive of Sainsbury's, John Davan Sainsbury (later Lord Sainsbury of Preston Candover), realised the threat from the emergence of hypermarkets, such as those being built by the French retailer Carrefour. The initial response by Sainsbury's was a 50:50 joint enterprise with British Home Stores, set up on 9 December 1975 as Sabre Hypermarkets Limited, which was changed to Savacentre Limited on 31 December 1976.

These stores carried the complete range of Sainsbury's and British Home Stores products along with electrical goods like refrigerators, washing machines, audio and TV equipment. Typical counters included delicatessen and fresh fish counters, an in-store bakery, a restaurant and half the stores' sales areas were devoted to textiles, electrical goods and hardware. The stores also featured a petrol filling station and some stores had over 1,000 car parking spaces. Following Sainsbury's launch of its home improvements venture, Homebase, in 1981, home and gardening products featured in SavaCentre stores. Following the 1986 merger between Habitat, Mothercare and British Home Stores to create Storehouse plc, baby care products were also sold in SavaCentre stores.

=== The first stores open ===
The first SavaCentre opened at The Galleries, Washington, Tyne and Wear, on 15 November 1977, with 70,000 sq ft (6,500 m^{2}) of sales area, and the slogan "The store with more for less.". This store was extended by a further 10,000 sq ft (930 m^{2}) to 80,000 sq ft (7,400 m^{2}) in 1986. On 17 October 1978, the second SavaCentre opened at the Hempstead Valley Shopping Centre in Kent. At the opposite end of the Hempstead Valley Shopping Centre a Presto opened, which later became a Safeway store. Following Sainsbury's buyout of Storehouse plc's 50% stake in SavaCentre in 1989, the British Home Stores branch was located in the former Safeway store, following Safeway's 2004 acquisition by Morrisons.

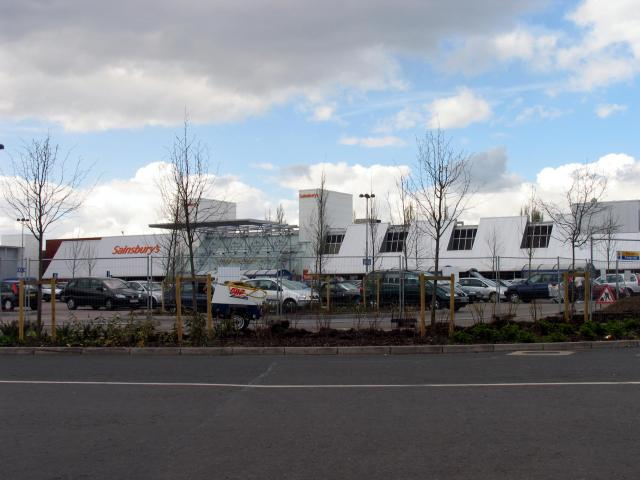
SavaCentre Hypermarket in Calcot, Reading

The number of SavaCentres grew slowly during the 1980s. In March 1980, the third SavaCentre opened adjacent to the Eastgate Shopping Centre in Basildon with 71,000 sq ft (6,600 m^{2}) of sales area, but this store was sold to Asda in 2004. In October 1980, a fourth SavaCentre opened in Oldbury, West Midlands. In September 1981, the Calcot SavaCentre, opened in Reading, and this store was used in the SavaCentre TV adverts in 1983. The Calcot SavaCentre was further extended by 20,000 sq ft (1,900 m^{2}) in the 1990/91 financial year, but when the store was rebranded as Sainsbury's in 2005, the extension was sold off to Next.

In 1984, SavaCentre started trading in Scotland following the opening of a store in Cameron Toll, Edinburgh. At the time of building the Cameron Toll SavaCentre was Scotland's largest single level store. This store also had to compete with a smaller Safeway supermarket in the same shopping centre, until the Safeway branch closed down in 1997.

The store in Colliers Wood, London, Merton SavaCentre opened on 28 February 1989 with 107,430 sq ft (9,981 m^{2}) of sales area, making it the largest hypermarket in the UK at the time of its opening. This store was later split up, with Sainsbury's taking 75,000 sq ft (7,000 m^{2}) of the sales area in 2005. The remainder of the space was taken by Marks & Spencer in 2008, with the store exterior featuring branding of both companies. Due to having two major shops (not just Sainsbury's) this branch is often still known as the London Savacentre. As well as Sainsbury's and M&S, it hosts an Argos store (opened 2018, having moved from the nearby Tandem Retail Park) and a Sainsbury's Fresh Kitchen (until 2022, replaced with a Starbucks in December 2024).

=== Becoming a wholly owned subsidiary of Sainsbury's ===
Logo under Sainsbury's full ownership

In March 1989, Sainsbury's bought out Storehouse plc's 50% share in the partnership for £123 million (valuing SavaCentre at £246 million in total or each of its then seven stores at £35.14 million each) and SavaCentre became a wholly owned subsidiary on 13 March 1989, in the last week of the financial year; the chain was rebranded "Sainsbury's SavaCentre". Sainsbury's initially negotiated a long-term contract with Storehouse to continue to supply SavaCentre with clothing, domestic textiles, lighting and other non-food lines, although these products were gradually phased out following the launch of Sainsbury's 'Lifestyle' range of own brand clothes in 1991. This was rebranded as 'I-N-I-T-I-A-L-S' in September 1996. The Sainsbury's own-label clothing range is now branded 'Tu'. At the time Sainsbury's believed there was scope for significant expansion. The deal also allowed Sainsbury's to integrate the company more fully with its existing food retailing chain, whilst retaining a separate management structure.

=== Further expansion ===
London Colney SavaCentre, off Junction 22 of the M25 motorway in Hertfordshire, opened on 13 March 1990 with 117,000 sq ft (10,900 m^{2}) of sales area, and at the time of its opening it also became the largest hypermarket in the UK. The London Colney hypermarket was so large that two-thirds of the sales space was devoted to non-food. This store was later split up, with Sainsbury's taking 85,000 sq ft (7,900 m^{2}) of the sales area. The balance was sold off to Marks & Spencer, and the store was then rebranded as "Sainsbury's M&S" in 2005.

Cheadle SavaCentre opened in 1990 with the BHS store opening towards the car park. BHS Cheadle closed in 1994, following John Lewis' taking over BHS in the next year after closure of BHS.

The SavaCentre in Meadowhall Shopping Centre, Sheffield, opened in September 1990 with 99,973 sq ft (9,287.8 m^{2}) of sales area. This store was originally rebranded as a Sainsbury's in 1999, but was closed and relocated to Crystal Peaks in 2006.

It was not until October 1993 that the tenth SavaCentre opened at Beckton in East London. This store became the smallest SavaCentre, with a sales area of 66,000 sq ft (6,100 m^{2}). At the same time, a new concept store, with 30,000 sq ft (2,800 m^{2}) of sales area, was opened adjacent to the SavaCentre. This store was based on a club warehouse type format, and was branded as "Bulksava". This format was not a success and the Bulksava branch closed down a year later.

In August 1995, the London Sydenham SavaCentre opened with a sales area of 85,000 sq ft (7,900 m^{2}). Also in 1995, the Stockton-on-Tees SavaCentre opened, with 85,000 sq ft (7,900 m^{2}) of sales area, which was a former North Eastern Co-op store, and was later sold to Tesco in 2003. In 1997 a SavaCentre opened in the White Rose Centre, off the M62 motorway, in Morley, West Yorkshire, in Leeds, with 85,000 sq ft (7,900 m^{2}) of sales area. When this store was rebranded as Sainsbury's in 2005, the sales area was cut to 67,000 sq ft (6,200 m^{2}).

A fourteenth SavaCentre hypermarket planned for Braehead in Renfrew, Scotland, was also due to open in 1997. This store opened in 1999 before moving to a larger 70,000 sq ft (6,500 m^{2}) in the same complex in 2009.

A fifteenth SavaCentre hypermarket was planned for Romford, East London, but this store also only eventually opened as a large Sainsbury's.

=== 1990s store formats strategy ===
During the 1990s, Sainsbury's continued to build around 20 new freehold supermarkets of around 30,000 sq ft (2,800 m^{2}) a year. Sainsbury's argued that customers would rather experience a full grocery offer which was not compromised by non-food. With stores of SavaCentre size, not only could the full range of Sainsbury's grocery products be sold, but a further sales area of equivalent size could be devoted to non-food. SavaCentre was still only a small part of the group, and did not make a significant contribution to the Group in comparison to Sainsbury's Supermarkets.

This came at a time when arch-rival Tesco was not only matching the Sainsbury's store portfolio, but also exceeding them in terms of store size. Tesco mimicked the Sainsbury's SavaCentre format, and launched its own Tesco Extra version only as recently as 1997, which was 20 years later than Sainsbury's. Tesco pursued an aggressive expansion of its hypermarket format, converting existing stores through extensions, and paying high prices for larger pieces of land to build new ones. Although Tesco Extras or ASDA Supercentres now dominate the hypermarket format, it was Sainsbury's who pioneered the modern hypermarket.

=== Launching a strategic review of SavaCentre ===
On 2 August 1997, Sainsbury's decided to launch a strategic review of its SavaCentre hypermarket format with the help of Coopers and Lybrand. The review concluded that to offer both the full Sainsbury's food offer and a comprehensive non-food offer, stores would have to have sales areas of at least 70,000 sq ft (6,500 m^{2}). Obtaining planning permission for stores of these sizes in out-of-town locations was difficult, and there was also stiff competition from specialist non-food retailers at the time.

It was therefore decided that the traditional SavaCentre hypermarket format would be scrapped, and the existing SavaCentre stores would be remodelled to look like a very large Sainsbury's Supermarket, concentrating on fresh foods and home meal replacements. Under the new format, DIY and gardening products, lighting, TVs and vacuum cleaners were to be removed. It was also decided that the SavaCentre name would be re-branded as "Sainsbury's Savacentre", to emphasise that the company was now a wholly owned subsidiary of Sainsbury's.

In August 1998, the Calcot SavaCentre was the first to be remodelled to provide a greater emphasis on food, with the food to non-food ratio changing from 60:40 to 80:20. Non-food was based around four areas: Celebration – for party ideas; Indulgence – for beauty products; Baby and Toddler; and Cookshop. The refurbishment cost £26m. The store director from 1996 to 2002 was Chris Diplock. The chairman of Savacentre Ian Coull, MD Jack O'Brien and other board members all resigned.

The plan was to roll out the format, which was trialled at the Calcot SavaCentre, to the other 12 SavaCentres over the next three years. This format was not a success and the Calcot SavaCentre became the only hypermarket to be remodelled in this format. The Calcot SavaCentre was downsized and rebranded as Sainsbury's in 2005, but following a further refurbishment in 2008, a number of the products removed in the 1998 revamp were reintroduced.

=== Launch of discount supermarkets ===
On 29 May 2002, Sainsbury's announced that it would be extending the SavaCentre format to include discount supermarkets, under the "Sainsbury's savacentre" brand name, with the slogan "Making Life Taste Better For Less". These stores were aimed at family shoppers with a much stronger emphasis on Economy ranges than a core Sainsbury's Supermarket. These stores would range in size from 31,000 sq ft (2,900 m^{2}) to 70,000 sq ft (6,500 m^{2}) of sales area, with a third of the space devoted to non-food. The plan was to launch 90 of these discount supermarkets in total, after the successful launch of six trial stores.

Only eight discount supermarkets were opened in total. The first store, with a sales area of 35,000 sq ft (3,300 m^{2}), opened in Northfield, Birmingham on 30 May 2002. Further stores were opened in Wigan, on 17 August 2002; Ashton-under-Lyne, Wednesfield, Wolverhampton, in 2002; Knotty Ash, Liverpool, on 1 March 2003; Stoke-on-Trent, on 18 March 2003; and stores in Bolton and Grimsby both opened on 27 March 2003.

This format was not a success and all eight stores have since reverted to the core Sainsbury's brand.

=== Disappearance ===
In April 1999, the Sainsbury's SavaCentre Head Office in Wokingham, Berkshire closed down and the administration moved to Sainsbury's Blackfriars headquarters in London. The Wokingham Head Office was originally opened in 1982.

At the same time, SavaCentre hypermarkets were integrated into Sainsbury's new "Large Store Formats Group", as Sainsbury's largest store format, a position it held until September 2010.

As a result of the 'Making Sainsbury's Great Again' recovery plan by chief executive Justin King, revealed on 19 October 2004, it was announced that the Sainsbury's SavaCentre concept would be scrapped, and would be integrated under the main Sainsbury's brand. It is believed that the SavaCentre brand name was scrapped because the SavaCentre format had had mixed success over the years, and it left the option for Sainsbury's to launch a substantial non-food offer in its heritage supermarket estate, under its own brand, in the future.

10 of the 13 former SavaCentre hypermarkets now trade as Sainsbury's, and all seven of the former Sainsbury's SavaCentre discount supermarkets now trade as Sainsbury's. The former SavaCentres in London Colney and Colliers Wood are now joint-ventures with Marks & Spencer, and have the external fascia 'Sainsbury's M&S'. The Meadowhall, Sheffield branch of SavaCentre was converted into a Sainsbury's supermarket store in 1999 and closed in 2005. At the same time as Meadowhall closed, in 2006, a replacement opened south of the city at Crystal Peaks. A number of the other SavaCentres were downsized, leaving the London Sydenham SavaCentre store the largest Sainsbury's store in the country until September 2010.

=== Beyond the SavaCentre format ===
In 2008, the London Sydenham and Oldbury SavaCentres were remodelled to trial a launch of a 30,000 sq ft (2,800 m^{2}) non-food offer. This was the first major attempt by Sainsbury's to launch its own substantial non-food offer since the launch of the "Lifestyle" clothing range in 1991. An extended range of Homewares, Bedding and Kitchenware launched under the TU brand, previously used only for Clothing. This format became a success, and later in 2008 Sainsbury's announced that it was going to extend as many as 100 existing Sainsbury's Supermarkets to SavaCentre store sizes of 60,000 sq ft (5,600 m^{2}) of sales area or more by 2014, to carry the new non-food offer trialled in the London Sydenham and Oldbury SavaCentres. For example, the Hayes, Middlesex branch was extended from 34,000 sq ft (3,200 m^{2}) to 83,000 sq ft (7,700 m^{2}) in sales area in November 2008. The Kempshott, Basingstoke branch was extended to 71,139 sq ft (6,609.0 m^{2}) of sales area and was both opened and reopened by Life President Lord Sainsbury of Preston Candover himself in November 1988 and 25 August 2010 respectively.

The largest format of Sainsbury's stores are now around 100,000 sq ft, launched from September 2010. These stores have sales areas of 95,000 sq ft (8,800 m^{2}) or more with a 55:45 split between food and non-food. The first three stores of this format were launched in Crayford, Lincoln and Stanway, Essex between September and December 2010.

== SavaCentre locations ==
=== Head offices ===
- 37 High Street, Theale, Berkshire 1975-82
- 45/47 Peach Street, Wokingham, Berkshire (1982–1999)
- Stamford House, Stamford Street, Blackfriars, London (1999–2001)
- 33 Holborn, London (2001–2005)

=== Hypermarkets ===
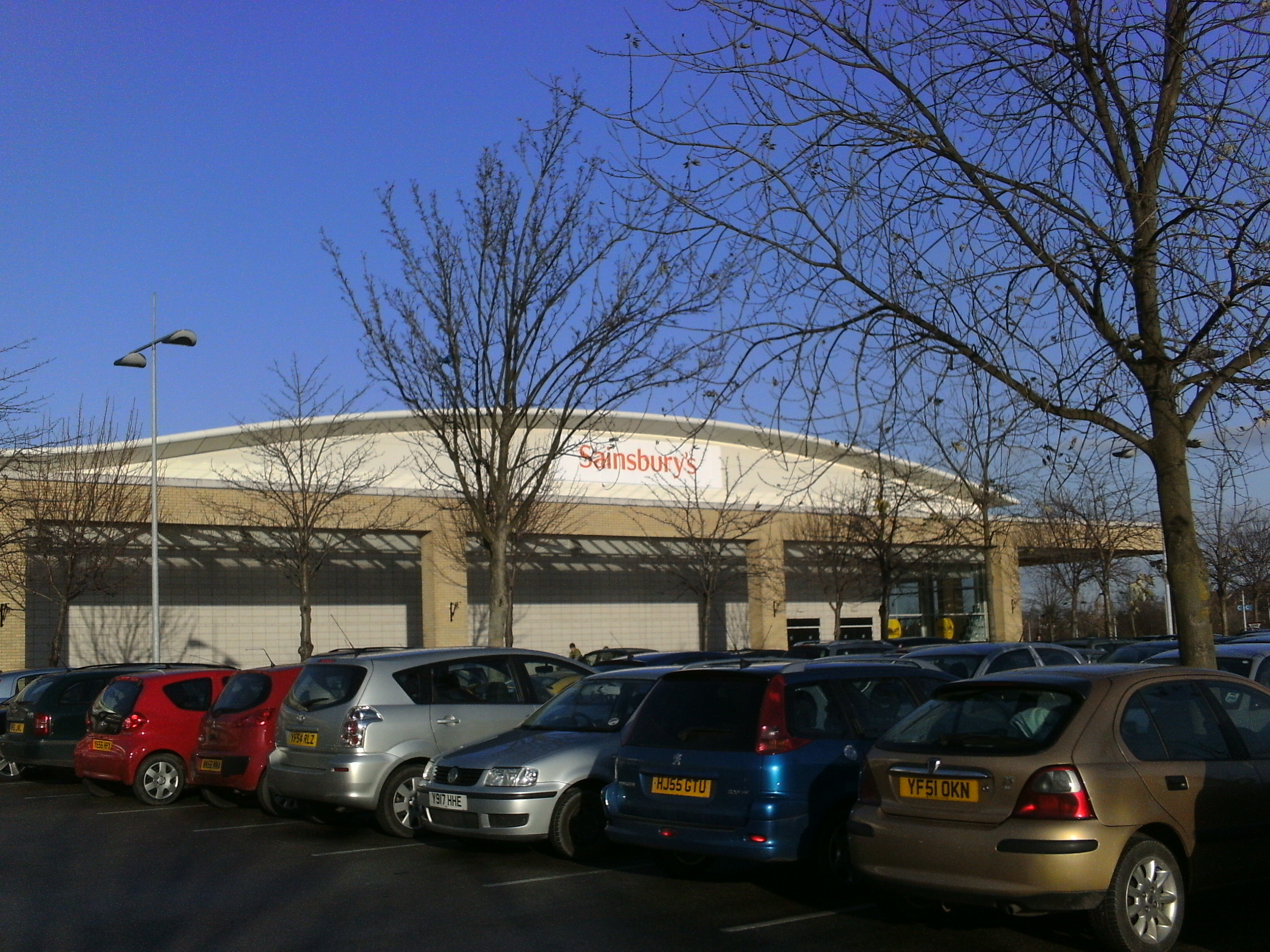
The former Sainsbury's SavaCentre at the White Rose Centre in Leeds.

- The Galleries, Washington, Tyne and Wear, opened 15 November 1977 and rebranded as Sainsbury's in 2005
- Hempstead Valley Shopping Centre, Hempstead, Kent, near Gillingham, Kent, opened 17 October 1978 and rebranded as Sainsbury's in 2005
- Basildon Town Centre, adjacent to the East Gate Shopping Centre, Essex, opened March 1980 and closed on 13 March 2004. Announcement of sale to Asda on 16 January 2004
- Oldbury, West Midlands, near Birmingham, opened October 1980 and rebranded as Sainsbury's in 2005
- Calcot, Berkshire, near Reading, Berkshire, opened September 1981, extended in 1990/91, downsized and rebranded as Sainsbury's in 2005
- Cameron Toll Shopping Centre, Cameron Toll, Edinburgh, Scotland, opened 1984 and rebranded as Sainsbury's in 2005
- Colliers Wood, south London, opened 28 February 1989, split up into a Sainsbury's store in 2005 and a M&S store in 2008.
- London Colney, near St Albans, Hertfordshire, opened 13 March 1990, split up into a Sainsbury's store and a M&S store in 2005
- Meadowhall Shopping Centre, Sheffield, opened September 1990, rebranded as Sainsbury's in August 1999, closed and relocated to Crystal Peaks in 2006
- Beckton, east London, opened October 1993 and rebranded as Sainsbury's in 2005
- Sydenham, South London, opened August 1995 and rebranded as Sainsbury's in 2005
- Stockton-on-Tees, opened 1995 and closed on 7 June 2003. Announcement of sale to Tesco on 22 April 2003
- White Rose Shopping Centre, Leeds, opened 1997, downsized and rebranded as Sainsbury's in 2005

=== Discount supermarkets ===
- Northfield, Birmingham, opened 30 May 2002
- Wigan, Greater Manchester, opened 17 August 2002 and rebranded as Sainsbury's in 2005
- Ashton-under-Lyne, Greater Manchester, opened August 2002
- Wednesfield, Wolverhampton, opened 2002 and rebranded as Sainsbury's in 2005
- Knotty Ash, Liverpool, opened 1 March 2003 and rebranded as Sainsbury's in 2005
- Stoke-on-Trent, Staffordshire, opened 18 March 2003 and rebranded as Sainsbury's in 2005
- Bolton, Greater Manchester, opened 27 March 2003 and rebranded as Sainsbury's in 2005
- Grimsby, Lincolnshire, opened 27 March 2003 and rebranded as Sainsbury's in 2005
