= Kamprad =

Kamprad is a Swedish surname. Notable people with the surname include:

- Ingvar Kamprad (1926–2018), Swedish businessman
- Jonas Kamprad (born 1966), Swedish businessman, son of Ingvar
- Klaus-Jürgen Kamprad (born 1962), German musicologist, publisher, music producer, and editor
