= Ikano =

International company based in Luxembourg

Ikano Group is a privately held international group of companies with the parent company Ikano S.A. based in Luxembourg. It was originally a part of IKEA, which was founded by Ingvar Kamprad, then became independent in 1988, and has since been owned by the Kamprad family.

== Operations ==
Ikano has operations in 15 countries in Europe, Southeast Asia and North America. Ikano performs business within the following areas:

- Data analysis (United Kingdom)
- Finance (Austria, Denmark, Finland, Germany, Norway, Poland, Sweden, United Kingdom)
- Group Services (Luxembourg)
- Insurance (Switzerland)
- Production (Mexico, Poland)
- Real Estate (Sweden, Denmark (Ikano Bolig))
- Retail (Malaysia, Philippines, Singapore, Thailand, Mexico)

Subsidiaries include for example Ikano Bank AB, Ikano Bostad AB (Real Estate). Its financial services include mortgage loans, consumer loans, and loyalty cards for retailers and the residential operations consist of rental and tenant owned apartments in various locations in Sweden.

Ikano owns the IKEA franchise rights for Malaysia, Philippines, Singapore, Mexico and Thailand, and operates IKEA stores in these markets.

== History ==
In 2015, Lars Thorsén succeeded Arja Taaveniku as CEO of Ikano Group.
