= Mothercare =

British retailer of products for expectant mothers

Mothercare plc
- Logo since 2008

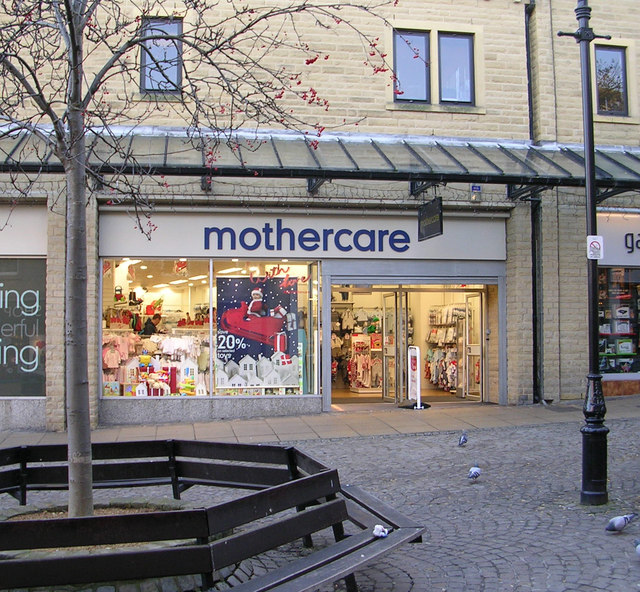
- Mothercare shop in the Woolshops shopping centre, Halifax, West Yorkshire, 2009
- Company type: Public
- Traded as: LSE: MTC
- Industry: Retail
- Predecessor: Storehouse plc
- Founded: 1961; 65 years ago
- Founders: Selim Zilkha; James Goldsmith
- Defunct: January 12, 2020; 6 years ago (United Kingdom); June 2020; 6 years ago (Ireland); January 20, 2022; 4 years ago (Germany); March 2022; 4 years ago (Russia); April 11, 2023; 3 years ago (Poland); June 13, 2023; 3 years ago (The Netherlands)
- Headquarters: Cherry Tree Road, Watford, Hertfordshire
- Number of locations: 1,227 (franchisees) (2019)
- Area served: Worldwide
- Key people: Clive Whiley (chairman)
- Products: Baby products
- Revenue: ▲£513.8 million (2019)
- Operating income: −£18.4 million (2019)
- Net income: −£66.6 million (2019)
- Number of employees: ▼3,752 (2019)
- Website: www.mothercareplc.com

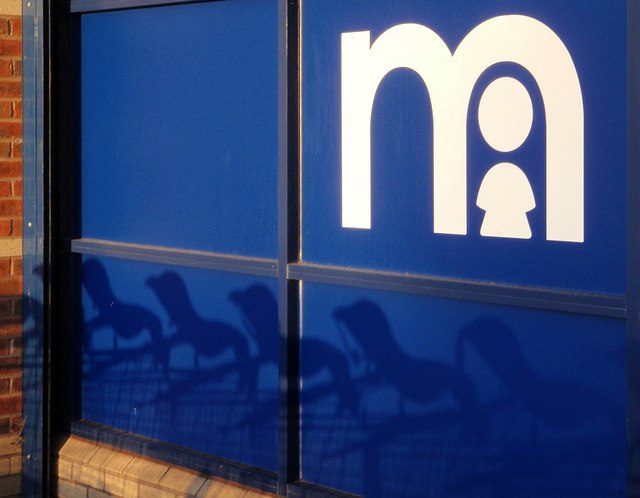
Child seats on shopping trolleys cast their shadows on the front of the Mothercare at Wren Park, Torquay.

Mothercare plc is a global brand for products for parents and young children. The company's shares are listed on AIM in London.

Mothercare was founded in the United Kingdom in 1961, and specialized in products for expectant mothers and in general merchandise for children up to eight years of age. Later, the company's shares were listed on the main market of the London Stock Exchange, and mergers and acquisitions involved Habitat, British Home Stores, and Early Learning Centre.

Mothercare's UK subsidiary had over 150 stores in 2017, but by 2019, the number had been reduced to 79. In November 2019, the subsidiary was placed into administration, which led to closure of all the stores, continuing as a franchise-only business. Mothercare-branded products are sold in the UK by Boots, and Mothercare continues to supply franchisees in other countries.

== History ==
The company was founded by Selim Zilkha and Sir James Goldsmith in 1961. It was first listed on the London Stock Exchange in 1972.

In 1982, the company merged with Habitat to form Habitat Mothercare plc. In 1986, Habitat Mothercare plc merged with British Home Stores, to form Storehouse plc. In January 1996, it bought Children's World from Boots, and rebranded these stores as Mothercare World. In May 2000, the Bhs stores were sold to Philip Green, and Storehouse reverted to the Mothercare brand.

In June 2007, Mothercare bought Early Learning Centre (ELC) for £85 million. In October 2007, it launched Gurgle, a pregnancy and parenting social networking website. In November 2009, Mothercare acquired the 50% of Gurgle that it did not already own.

In July 2010, Mothercare bought the trademark and brand of Blooming Marvellous, a privately owned rival.

In May 2018, it was confirmed that Mothercare would close 50 stores in the United Kingdom under company voluntary arrangement schemes affecting three subsidiaries: Mothercare UK Limited, Early Learning Centre Limited and Childrens World Limited. The Early Learning Centre business – which operated in 80 UK stores and 400 overseas franchises – was sold to the Entertainer group in March 2019.

During the 2019 financial year, the company's Watford headquarters was sold in a leaseback transaction which raised £14.5M. In July 2019, the company said it was planning to spin off its UK retail business due to decreased sales. The company reported that UK store sales had fallen by 23.2%, while online sales in the UK were down by 12.1%. The company recorded a worldwide sales drop of 9.4%.

In November 2019, the company put Mothercare UK (and Mothercare Business Services) into administration; all the UK shops and the UK website closed soon after.

The company's shares are traded in London on AIM. In October 2024, Mothercare restructured its operations in South Asia in a joint venture with Reliance Brands.

== Operations ==
The company operated online, on high streets and in out-of-town retail parks. In November 2009 it had over 1,060 stores worldwide, of which 389 were in the United Kingdom, and 671 were in 38 other countries.

In January 2019, Mothercare announced that its store closure programme was ahead of schedule and the group was on course to have 79 shops by the end of March 2019.

Following the closure of the UK business, from mid-2020 some Mothercare-branded products were to be sold by Boots, both online and in stores.

== Financials ==
In September 2014, Mothercare made a nine-for-ten rights issue at 125p per share, a discount of 34.2 per cent to the then current share price, in order to raise £95m net of expenses, to be used to pay off £40 million in loans. By March 2018, Mothercare were in talks with the banks to waive their covenants, causing the company's share price to fall by one third to 22 pence per share, and had a pension shortfall of £80m.

Gordon Brothers has provided long-term secured loans to Mothercare plc and Mothercare Global Brand Limited, which amounted to £19.5 million in December 2020. In October 2024, after Mothercare received £16m from Reliance Brands for its 51% stake in their joint venture, the Gordon Brothers loan was replaced with an £8m arrangement.

=== UK administration ===
On 4 November 2019, Mothercare announced it was appointing administrators for its UK operations of 79 stores, placing 2,500 jobs at risk. The company, which suffered a loss of £36.3m during 2018–19, stated the decision came after a review made clear that the business would not return to profitability. On 5 November, it was announced by the administrators that there would be a phased closure of all UK stores and its headquarters.

== Internationally ==
=== Kuwait ===
In 1983, M.H. Alshaya Co. began its first franchise operation with the Mothercare brand in Kuwait, which was also its first international store. Alshaya operates Mothercare franchises in the Middle East, North Africa, central and eastern Europe, and Russia.

=== Singapore, Malaysia and Hong Kong ===
In Singapore, the Mothercare brand is represented by Kim Hin International Pte. Ltd. which began in 1984 by its founder and current chairman, Pang Kim Hin.

=== India ===
Reliance Brands and Mothercare plc formed a joint venture where Reliance holds a 51% stake and Mothercare a 49% stake, to own the Mothercare brand and intellectual property in India and other South Asian countries. This partnership, announced in October 2024, allows Reliance to operate the brand as its franchisor, with Reliance Brands Holding UK purchasing its stake for £16 million.

== Controversy ==
The British retailer Poundland planned to open a store in Biggleswade, dubbed "Motherland", with a logo similar to Mothercare's. In February 2023, after Mothercare sent a cease and desist to the discount retailer, the store was renamed to "Parentland" and the logo was changed to the same font as the Poundland logo.
