= Chmielna 89 =

Skyscraper office building in Warsaw, Poland

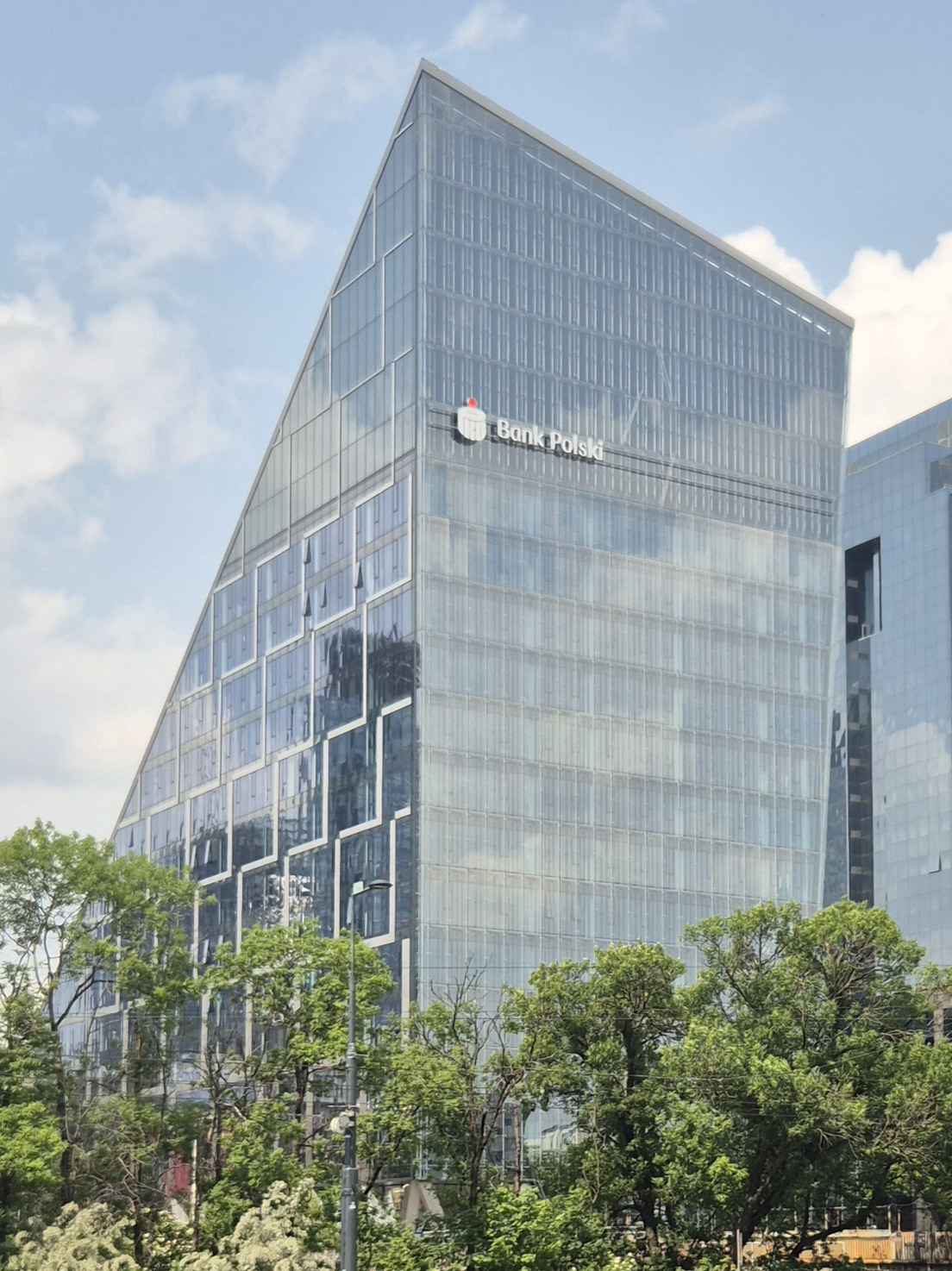
- The building in 2025

General information
- Type: Skyscraper office building
- Architectural style: High-tech; Postmodernism
- Location: Wola, Warsaw, Poland, 89 Chmielna Street
- Coordinates: 52°13′37″N 20°59′32″E
- Construction started: December 2017
- Completed: May 2020
- Owner: Madison International Realty (65%); Cavatina Holding (35%)

Height
- Architectural: 79 m (259 ft)
- Roof: 79 m

Technical details
- Floor count: 14
- Floor area: 28,350 m^{2} (305,200 sq ft)

Design and construction
- Architecture firm: Epstein
- Developer: Cavatina Holding

Chmielna 89 (Polish: [ˈxmjɛl.na ɔ.ɕɛmˈd͡ʑɛ.ɕɔnt ˈd͡ʑɛ.vjɛɲt͡ɕ]) is a high-tech postmodernist skyscraper office building in Warsaw, Poland, located at 89 Chmielna Street, at the intersection with Miedziana Street, and near Jerusalem Avenue, within the Wola district. It borders the V Tower skyscraper. The 14-storey-building has the height of 79 m (259 ft), with an irregular form of a asymmetrically-dented trapezoidal polyhedron, with each side having a different shape. It was opened in 2020, and is the headquarters of PKO Bank Polski.

== History ==
Chmielna 89 was designed by the Epstein architecture firm, as an investment of the Cavatina Holding. It was constructed between December 2017 and May 2020. The building was originally proposed as a 300-metre-tall skyscraper, that would have been called Kulczyk Tower, and developed by Kulczyk Silverstein Properties. However, the project did not receive permission for construction, and was subsequently abandoned. A 79-metre-tall tower was developed instead. In 2019, the project received the International Property Award. In 2020, it received the BREEAM certificate. The same year, 65% of its ownership was sold to United States-based Madison International Realty. It also became headquarters of the PKO Bank Polski.

== Architecture ==
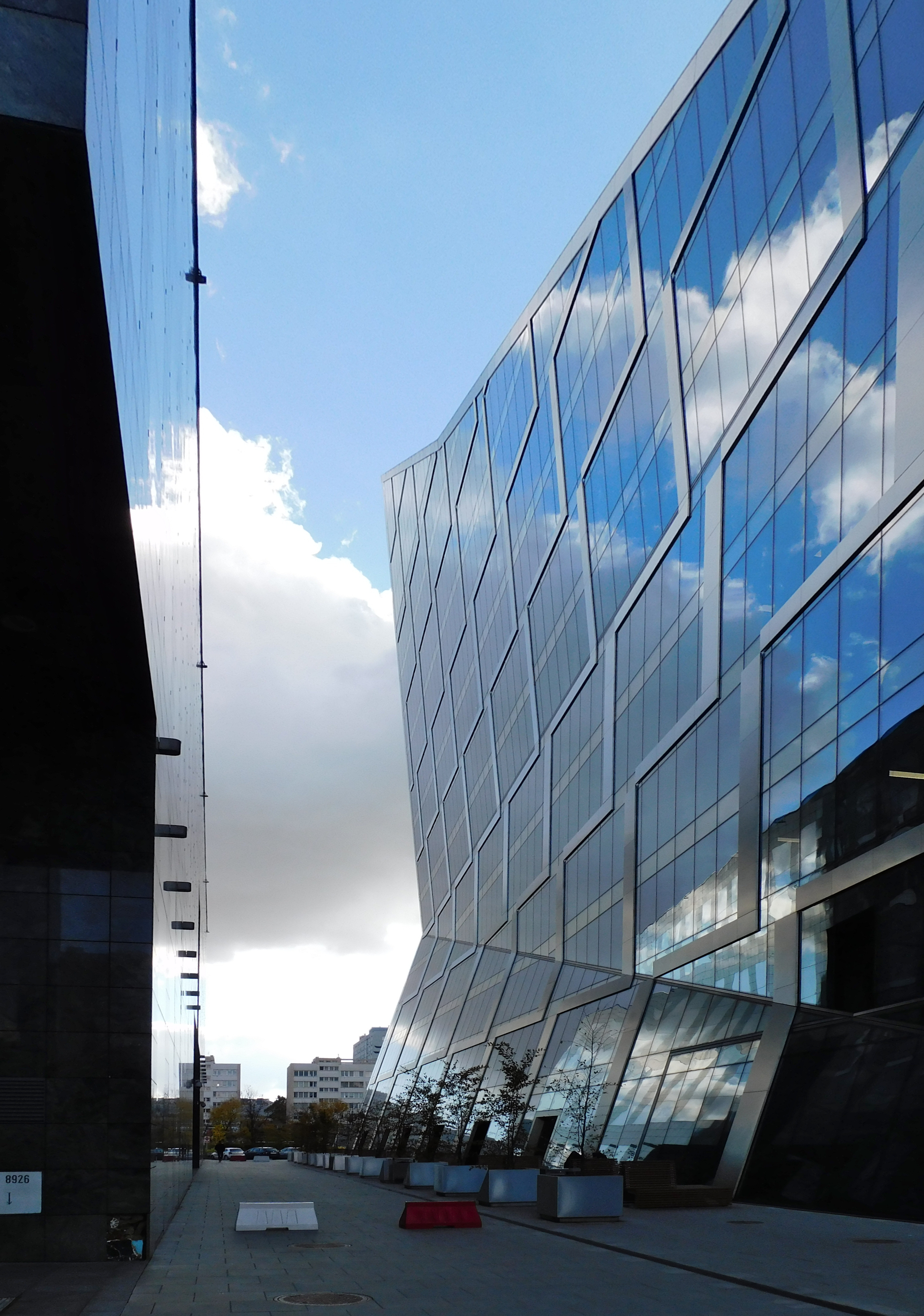
The façade as seen from Chmielna Street

Chmielna 89 is a high-tech postmodernist skyscraper office building, located at 89 Chmielna Street, at the intersection with Miedziana Street, and near Jerusalem Avenue. It borders V Tower skyscraper. The 14-storey-building has an irregular form, with the shape of an asymmetrically dented trapezoidal polyhedron, with each side having a different shape. When viewed from Chmielna Street is it seen as an irregular form with sharp inverted angles, from the Warsaw Ochota railway station, as a right-angled triangle, and from Jerusalem Avenue as a classical cuboid. It has an angeled roof with triangulary-shapaed side walls. The side of Jerusalem Avenue features a uniform glass wall façade, while the remaining sides are covered in glass panels with steel frames. The main entrance at Miedziana Street features an arcade with large oblique pillars. The entrance on Chmielna Street features terraces with a garden. The building has the total height of 79 m (259 ft), and total floor area of 28,350 m^{2} (305,200 sq ft). It has two underground storeys.
