= Warta (disambiguation) =

Warta refers to:

- Warta, a river in Poland
- Warta, Poland, a town in Poland
- Warta Bolesławiecka, a village in Poland
- Warta Gorzów Wielkopolski, a football club in Gorzów Wielkopolski, Poland
- Warta Nabada District, district in Somalia
- Warta Polpharma, a maxi-catamaran
- Warta Poznań, a football club in Poznań, Poland
- Warta Zawiercie (football), a football club in Zawiercie, Poland
- Warta Zawiercie (volleyball), a volleyball club in Zawiercie, Poland
- HP Warta, a handball club in Gothenburg, Sweden
- IF Warta, a football club in Gothenburg, Sweden
- Warta Tower, former name for V Tower, an office building in Warsaw, Poland
