= V Tower =

V Tower may refer to:

- V Tower (Prague), a skyscraper in the Czech Republic
- V Tower (Warsaw), a skyscraper in Poland
