= Joanna Rajkowska =

Polish contemporary artist (born 1968)

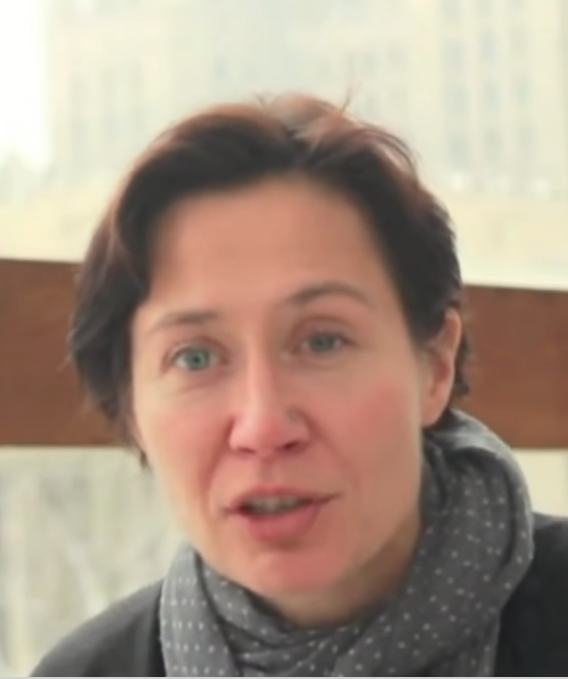
- Joanna Rajkowska in 2013
- Born: 1968 (age 57–58); Bydgoszcz, Poland
- Education: Jan Matejko Academy of Fine Arts
- Known for: installation art

Joanna Rajkowska (born 1968) is a Polish contemporary artist who came onto the Polish art scene in the 1990s. Her most famous work is called "Greetings from Jerusalem Avenue", a 15-meter-tall (49-foot) artificial palm tree installed on Warsaw's Jerusalem Avenue.

The installation was organized by the Warsaw Centre for Contemporary Art (13 December 2002 – 13 December 2003). Since then, the palm tree has become a permanent fixture of Warsaw, as it was not removed at the end of the official exhibition but instead came under the protection of the President of Warsaw.

It went neglected and leafless two years later, until the artist and friends mounted its restoration. It still stands in the center of the city. In the summer of 2007, the palm underwent a complete makeover, becoming more weatherproof and easier to maintain (unlike natural palms, its fronds require periodic manual replacement).

== Life ==
Born in Bydgoszcz, Poland, Joanna Rajkowska studied painting at the Academy of Fine Arts in Kraków, Poland (1988–1993), and art history at Jagiellonian University, Kraków, Poland (1988–1993). She also completed the Studio Semester Program at the State University of New York, U.S. (1994–1995).

== Work ==
Rajkowska describes the sense of her activity as building relationships with other people. She often only sets up the context of a meeting, allowing it to be an open experience. She usually engages a number of people as participants, and she also uses herself in her work. For example, in Satisfaction Guaranteed, her body was being symbolically consumed by other people. In 2014 she covered a tenement building in Lodz with mirrors, taking inspiration from her daughter's returning vision after treatment for retinoblastoma; the work is known is Rosa's Passage.

=== Greetings from Jerusalem Avenue ===
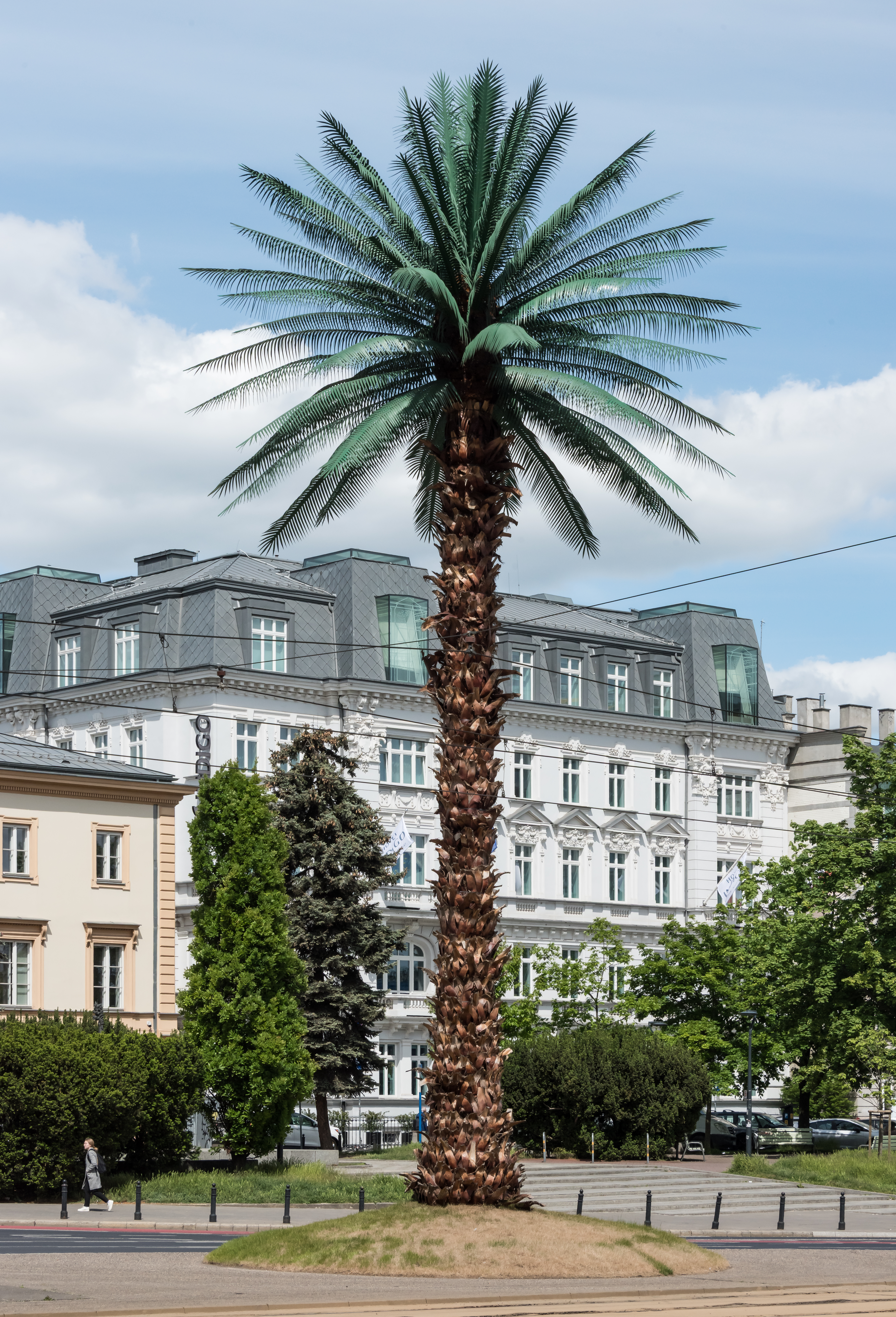
"Greetings from Jerusalem Avenue." Artificial palm tree in Warsaw, conceived by Joanna Rajkowska.

Greetings from Jerusalem Avenue – the 15-meter (49-foot) tall artificial palm tree installed in the centre of Warsaw – an installation created by Rajkowska after her trip with Artur Żmijewski to Israel in the spring of 2001. It is an attempt to infuse with Israel's scenery Warsaw's Jerusalem Avenue – a street whose name and history, in return, sends the observer back to Israel. In another way, the palm tree refers to a popular idiomatic expression in the Polish language (Polish: palma odbija – literally: "the palm tree sprouts/bounces back") that indicates something unthinkable, outside common understanding, escaping the usual way of reasoning, simply – something idiotic. On the other hand, through the very presence of the palm tree in the middle of Warsaw's centre, it may signify that the commonly accepted way of reasoning does not fit the real world.

== Exhibitions ==
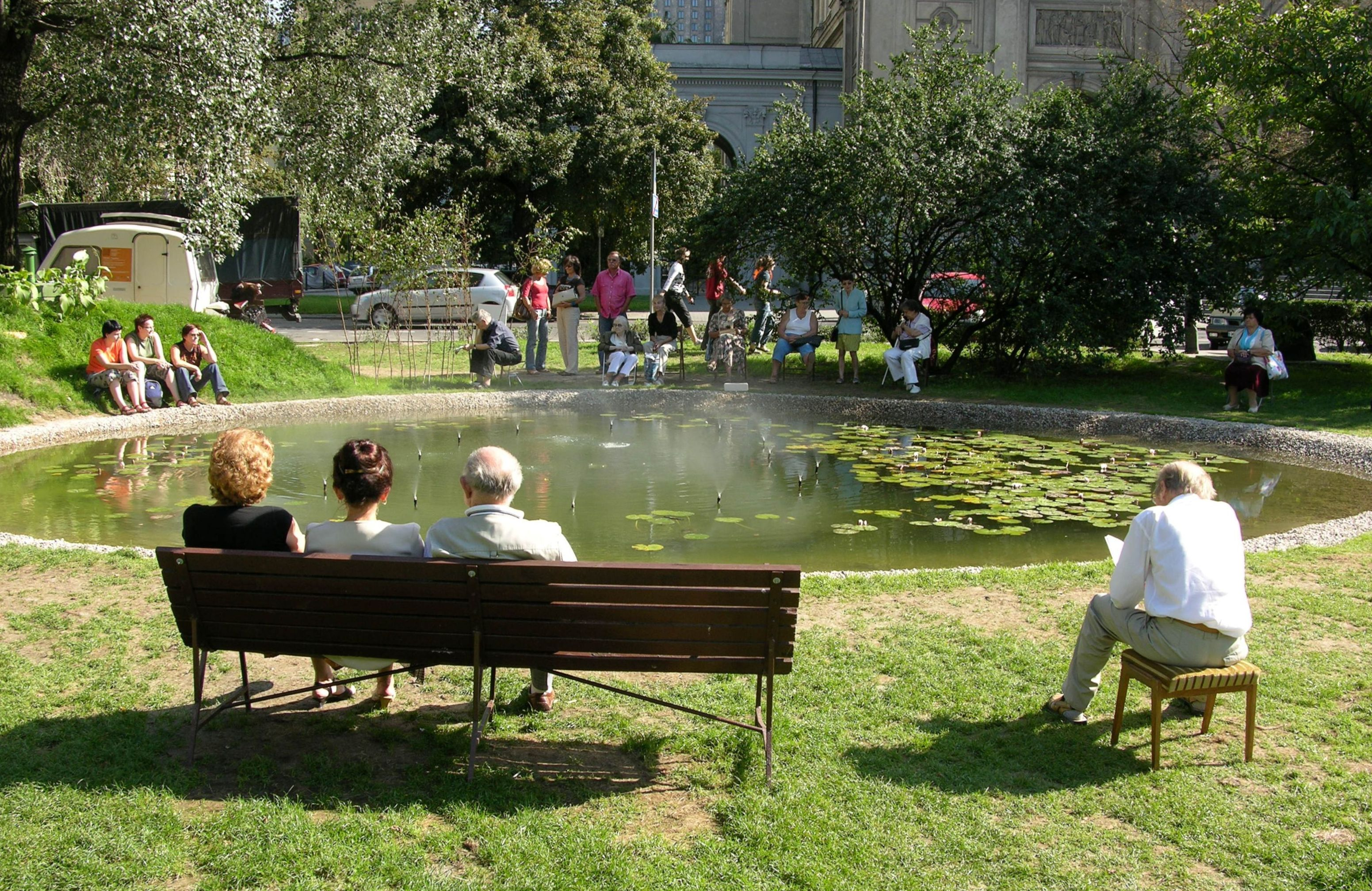
Oxygenator in the Grzybowski Square in Warsaw, 2007

- 2022 Rhizopolis, Joanna Rajkowska, Andrew Dixon, Jan Tarasin Gallery, Kalisz, Poland
- 2022 Event Horizon, Gdańsk City Gallery 2, Poland
- 2021 Rhizopolis, Zachęta National Gallery, Warsaw, Poland
- 2019-2021 The Hatchling, The Line, London, UK
- 2018 Suiciders, TRAFO Center for Contemporary Art, Szczecin, Poland
- 2018 Altered Stated, Kunstpalais Erlangen, Germany
- 2017 Painkillers, Rampa, Istanbul, Turkey
- 2012 Born in Berlin, 7th Berlin Biennale, Berlin, Germany
- 2008 Spitoon Zachęta, Warsaw, Poland
- 2007 Oxygenator (Polish: Dotleniacz), (public project), Warsaw, Poland
- 2005 Twenty-Two Tasks, Program Gallery, Warsaw, Poland
- 2004 Only Love, (public project), Warsaw, Poland
- 2003 Formal Promise. Artist For Rent, Mullerdechiara Gallery, Berlin, Germany
- 2002 Greetings from Jerusalem Avenue, (public project), Warsaw, Poland
- 2002 My Great-Grandmother Rosa Stern, (Photofestival), Skulpturen Hus, Stockholm, Sweden
- 2001 Stockholm International Art Fair, Stockholm, Sweden
- 2000 The Diary of Dreams, XX1 Gallery, Warsaw, Poland
- 2000 Satisfaction Guaranteed, Centre for Contemporary Art, Ujazdowski Castle, Warsaw, Poland
- 2000 Satisfaction Guaranteed, AMS – Outdoor Gallery, 400 billboards all over Poland
- 1999 On Saturday I Eat Sweets and I Masturbate, Open Gallery, Kraków, Poland
- 1999 Things I Do In the Evenings, Manhattan Gallery, Łódź, Poland
- 1998 Menu of Desires, Bunkier Sztuki Gallery, Kraków, Poland
- 1998 The Love of a Man Named Dog, Contemporary Art Gallery Zachęta, Warsaw, Poland
- 1997 Lobster Lovers, Hallwalls Contemporary Art Center, Buffalo, New York, USA
- 1996 Trio for Skin, Voice and the Madman, Bucklein Theatre, Kraków, Poland
- 1996 Water-Tower. Headache, Centre for Contemporary Art, Warsaw, Poland
- 1995 No Sign of Dying Soon. The Past – the Physical Presence, State University of NY, NYC, USA
- 1995 Irritation, Zderzak Gallery, Kraków, Poland
- 1994 Fluids, Zderzak Gallery, Kraków, Poland

== Awards ==
- 2001 The Ministry of Culture and National Heritage Scholarship, Poland
- 1998 The Civitella Ranieri Fellowship
- 1997 The Skowhegan School of Painting and Sculpture Fellowship
- 1996 The ArtsLink Partnership, Buffalo, USA
- President's Award of the City of Kraków, Kraków, Poland

== See also ==
- Profile at culture.pl
