= Greetings from Jerusalem Avenue =

Public artwork in Warsaw, Poland

- Pozdrowienia z Alej Jerozolimskich (Polish)
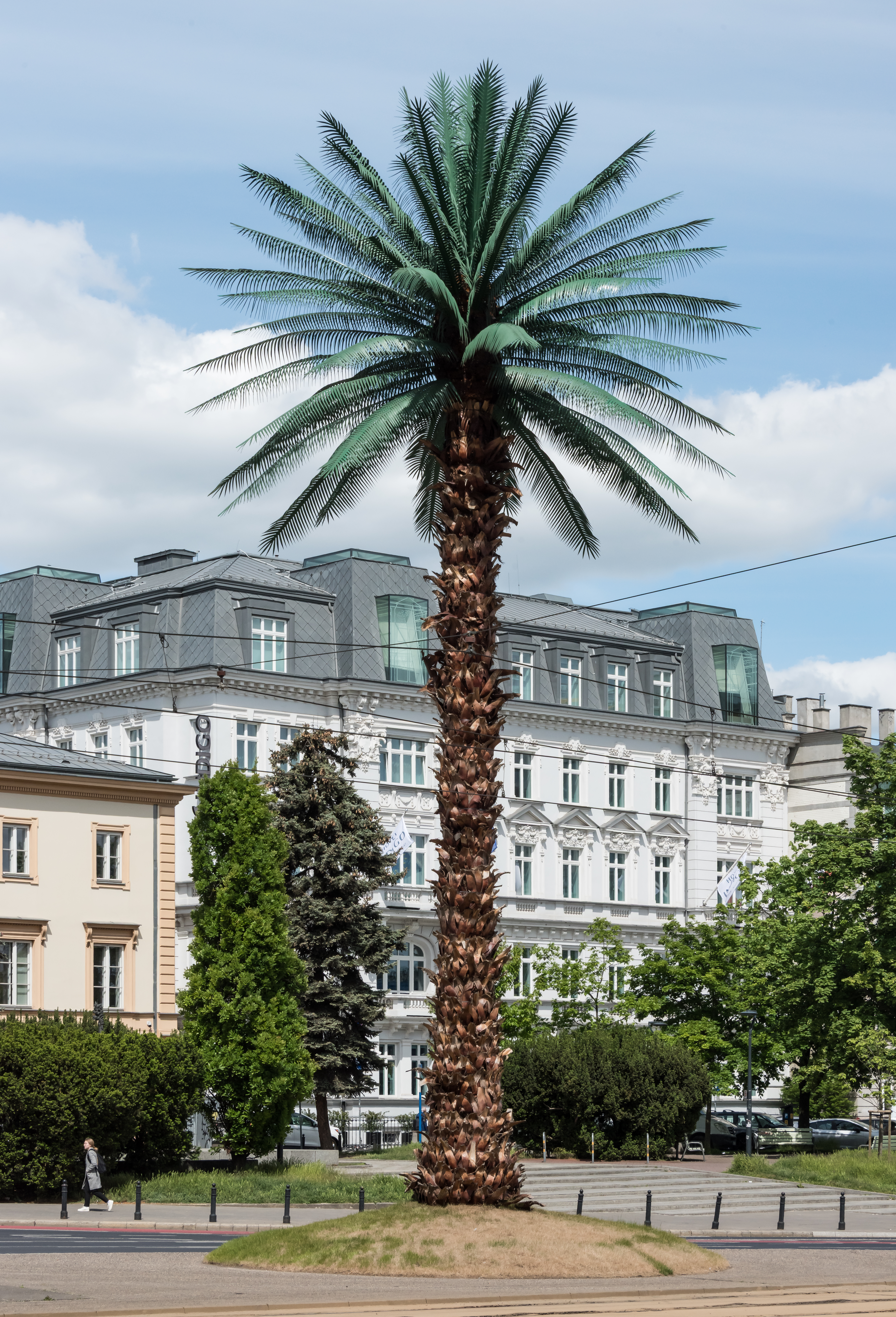
- Artist: Joanna Rajkowska
- Year: 2002
- Medium: Mixed-media installation
- Dimensions: c. 15 metres (49 ft)
- Location: Charles de Gaulle Roundabout, Warsaw; 52.2317°N 21.0208°E
- Curated by: Museum of Modern Art

Greetings from Jerusalem Avenue (Polish: Pozdrowienia z Alej Jerozolimskich) is a site-specific artwork in the form of a life-size artificial date palm. It was designed by Polish artist Joanna Rajkowska, and is located on the Charles de Gaulle Roundabout (Rondo gen. Charles’a de Gaulle’a), where Jerusalem Avenue (Aleje Jerozolimskie) intersects with New World Street (Nowy Świat) in the Polish capital of Warsaw. It was erected on December 12, 2002.

The work was intended by Rajkowska to draw attention to "the absence of the Jewish community in Poland" by highlighting and challenging "the invisibility of the street’s name." The project was thus intended as a social experiment, an anti-monument that metaphorically brings the “vanished Jews back into the landscape of contemporary Poland”.

Greetings from Jerusalem Avenue has become one of the most iconic art projects realised in Poland's public space after 1989 and its meaning has continuously evolved and extended. Since its inception, the palm tree location has become a prominent site for political and social activists, including women, nurses, LGBTQ+ communities, environmental activists, protesters against the war in Ukraine, and other groups.

== Inspiration ==
The palm tree was inspired by Joanna Rajkowska's and fellow artist Artur Żmijewski's visit to Israel in 2001 during the Second Intifada. During their stay in Jerusalem, they witnessed distant explosions, the sound of Israeli helicopters over Bethlehem and Rajkowska provoked an incident in the Orthodox district of Mea Shearim when she lay down across a pavement and only stood up when she was about to be hit by an enraged Hassidic Jew. These experiences left Rajkowska with “an omnipresent sense of fear and powerlessness” and a “profound sense of incomprehension.”

Upon her return to Warsaw, Rajkowska researched the history of Jerusalem Avenue in Warsaw and discovered that the street was named after an 18th-century Jewish settlement which existed for two years before it was dismantled by a group of merchants and craftsmen, jealous of the settlement’s economic prosperity. The settlement was called New Jerusalem and was established at present day Plac Zawiszy (Zawisza Square), then on the outskirts of Warsaw. Rajkowska was also impacted by a postcard found by Żmijewski in the Old Town in Yerushalayim, which featured a bare hill, a single palm tree and the words “Greetings from Hebron”. To her, the postcard looked as if it had been printed in Poland in the 1980s.

These connections, together with the ongoing Israeli aggression in occupied Palestine, highlighted for Rajkowska the historical and affective links between Jerusalem and Warsaw. They also produced a sense of profound anxiety linked to Rajkowska’s family history, which included her father and grandmother’s escape from a train bound for Auschwitz. Back in Warsaw, Rajkowska started to feel the acute void left by the Holocaust and experienced “a short circuit, [as if] the frames from Warsaw and Jerusalem overlapped.” Greetings from Jerusalem Avenue was therefore created both as a result of the trip to Israel and Rajkowska’s mourning over the genocide that had taken place in her country. The project is hence a comment on Polish-Jewish history and an expression of a transgenerational trauma, which tragically connects Poland and Israel. Before the Second World War, 30% of Warsaw's population was Jewish (about 370,000 people) in comparison to the current estimated population of 0.125% (less than 2,000 people).

The initial concept for the project emerged when, after their return to Warsaw, Żmijewski and Rajkowska were writing a text about the situation in Israel and no conclusion seemed obvious. Struggling with expressing herself in textual form, Rajkowska suddenly had an idea of how to engage with the topic as an artist. She envisaged putting up an espalier of palm trees along Jerusalem Avenue, a street she knew very well. In her own words, Greetings from Jerusalem Avenue started as “a caprice of imagination in the form of a question: what would it be like if Jerusalem Avenue in Warsaw was suddenly planted with palm trees, like the streets of Jerusalem?” Unable to carry out a project on such a scale, Rajkowska opted for a singular tree.

Rajkowska considers her artistic construction to be Leftist.

== Location ==
The location of Greetings from Jerusalem Avenue is topographically, historically, politically and socially significant. It is located at the De Gaulle Roundabout at the intersection of Nowy Świat street and Jerusalem Avenue. The latter is one of the main streets in Warsaw, featuring the Central Railway Station and the Stalinist Palace of Culture and Science. Nowy Świat, meanwhile, is home to many iconic city sites and governmental buildings in Warsaw, including the Old Town, the Presidential Palace, the Prime Minister’s Office and the Polish Parliament building. De Gaulle Roundabout itself is an important intersection, located by the former Central Committee of the Polish United Workers’ Party, which became Warsaw Stock Exchange following the fall of Communism in 1989. During the Second World War, there were numerous Nazi round-ups and murders of Polish civilians in the area and transports of prisoners to the Gestapo Detention Centre on Szucha Avenue. Both streets were almost completely destroyed during the Warsaw Uprising in 1944. Rajkowska has stated that “the name Jerusalem Avenue is a sign of our history. […] The name has grown into our culture to such an extent that nobody can hear what it means.”

== Construction ==
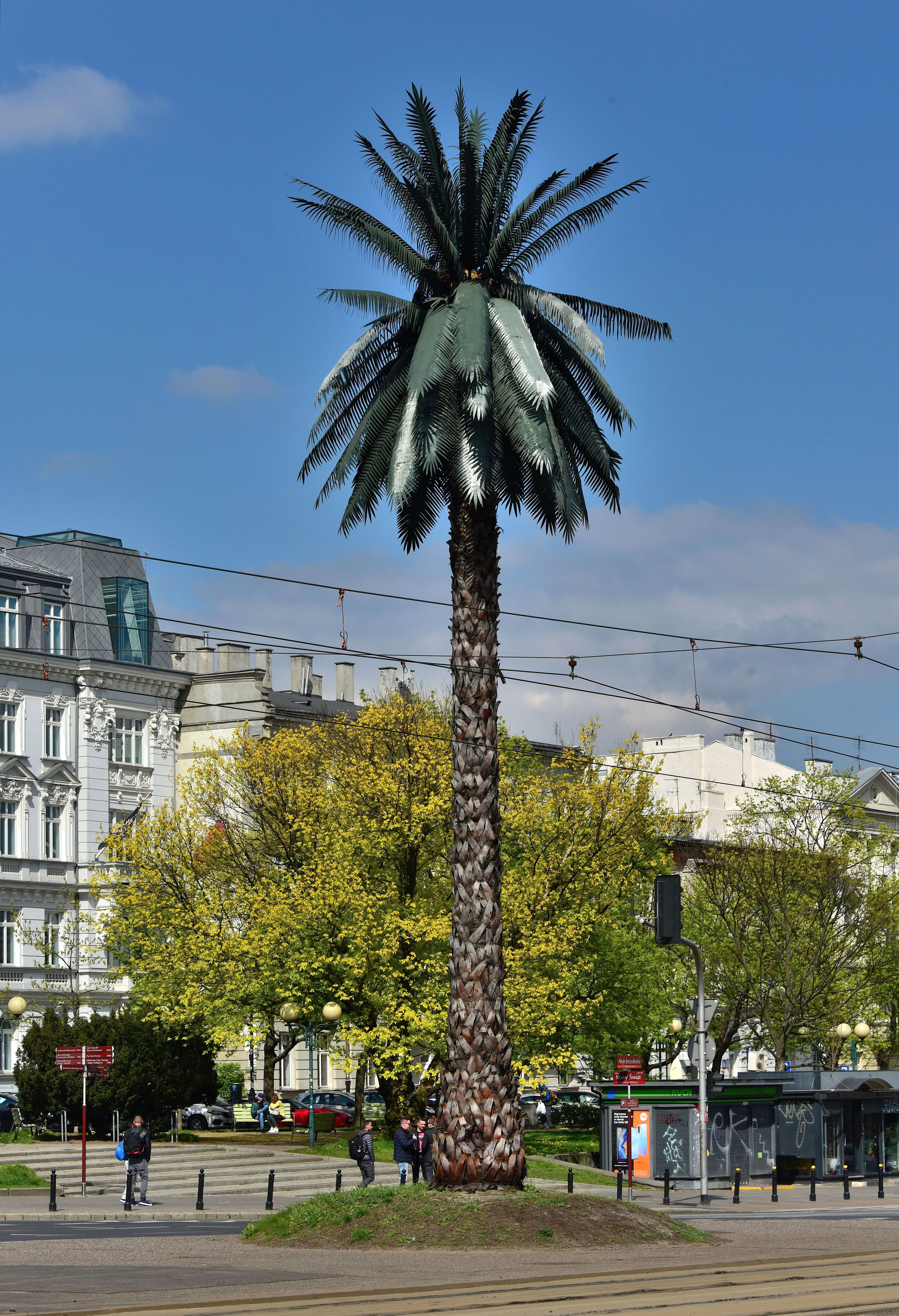
The tree in 2019

The palm is a life-size replica of a hybrid date and coconut palm tree, mounted on a slightly elevated circular foundation covered with self-seeding weeds. It is a mixed-media art installation, made of metal, PVC, fibreglass, polyurethane resin and natural date palm bark. The 12-meter (36 feet) tall structure is not permanently attached to the ground, instead, it is mounted on an octagonal metal foundation, a so-called grill, weighed down by concrete prefabricates, covered with soil and self-seeding weeds. The trunk is supported by a steel pipe and covered with natural date palm bark. Each leaf is made of fiberglass and resin mounted on a steel core, and attached to the trunk with metal bolts. During its existence, the installation has gone through several technical restorations to stabilize its structure, and ensure durability. The present combination of artificial and natural materials give the replica a natural appearance and make it resistant to weather conditions. The tree itself was made by an American company Soul-utions.Com.

=== Installation and maintenance ===
Construction of the artwork started as a partisan project and was organised by a small team of people: Michał Rudnicki (architect), Katarzyna Łyszkowicz (representative of Anda Rottenberg's foundation – the Institute of Art Promotion) and the artist herself, with financial backing from German, Norwegian, American and Polish companies, institutions and individuals. The trunk was manufactured in Escondido near San Diego on the Mexican-US border by a company based in Las Vegas and transported to Warsaw via Los Angeles, Houston and Gdynia. When the tree was erected in December 2002, tram traffic was suspended for two hours by the Warsaw Tram Company.

Initially, Greeting from Jerusalem Avenue was managed by the Warsaw Centre for Contemporary Art. However, as no art institution wanted to assume full responsibility for the project, by 2003 the installation did not have a formalised legal situation and had generated debt due to the unauthorised occupation of public space. To preserve its existence, the Palm Tree Defense Committee (Komitet Obrony Palmy) was formed, including major figures in the Polish art world. The Committee initiated the process of changing the work’s legal status from a “non-road object” to “a small piece of architecture” and, eventually, to “an artistic installation.” However, from December 2003 until late 2005, the project languished in legal limbo and in November 2004, the remaining leaves were taken down in protest at the situation.

A survey conducted in November 2005 showed that 72% of Varsovians supported the project. In spring 2006, the project received financial support from the Municipal Garden Works Company to be restored. The restoration, however, was not successful, as the right-wing Law and Justice local government did not provide sufficient funds. A grassroots initiative, organised among others by artists, philosophers and opera singers, allowed for the purchase of leaves which were elaborate, yet short-lived. In 2007, thanks to financial assistance from the National Depository for Securities, the installation underwent a complete makeover, acquired a new structural head as well as leaves that were tested in aerodynamic tunnels at speeds of up to 300 km/h. In 2012, Greetings from Jerusalem Avenue became part of the collection of the Museum of Modern Art in Warsaw (MSN). In December 2020, to mark the eighteenth anniversary of the installation, MSN opened a Palmiarnia (palm tree house), a temporary mini-exhibition of artefacts significant to the history of the project, located at Nowy Świat 18/20 in the immediate vicinity of De Gaulle Roundabout.

== Critical reception ==
Greetings from Jerusalem Avenue attracted media attention before it was even installed. The earliest articles date back to 2001. Once the installation was unveiled, it received immediate attention from the Polish and foreign press. By 2003, numerous articles had been published, including in Süddeutsche Zeitung, the Los Angeles Times, the Polish edition of Newsweek, and Gazeta Wyborcza, a major Polish newspaper. The coverage focused on the political transformation in Poland, accession to the European Union, and the country’s economic development. The Newsweek issue featured an image of Lech Wałęsa and the Solidarity movement logo in front of the tree.

Both Rajkowska and the general public have linked the tree to the idiomatic Polish expression "palma odbija" (literally: "the palm tree sprouts/bounces back"), used to describe crazy or extravagant behaviour or indicate something unthinkable, beyond one's ken, or simply something idiotic. Early publications also emphasised the carnivalesque character of the palm tree and described it as an exotic and playful symbol of the new Poland: a young capitalist country with big hopes in a unified Europe. The original context of the Polish-Jewish connections was almost completely lost.

Greetings from Jerusalem Avenue has received relatively little attention in academic circles. The first critical text was published six years after the project was completed, yet despite becoming one of the most recognizable sights in Warsaw, scholarship addressing the circumstances or impact of the installation has been scarce. Authors have analysed the installation in the context of colonialism and postcolonialism, Polish-Jewish history, memory after the Holocaust, the Polish-Jewish-Palestinian geopolitical triangle, and the emigration of the Jews from Poland to the United States.

== Opposition ==
Greetings from Jerusalem Avenue has been criticised by numerous people and circles on the Polish political right. Some have called it “a punch in the face” to Polish Catholic values. In 2002, Lech Kaczyński, then Mayor of Warsaw and future President of Poland, claimed: “Customarily, this was the place where during Christmas, the Christmas tree was placed. This is our tradition that we should cultivate. [When the permit expires], ideas of this sort will not be tolerated.” Since then, the Christmas tree's location has moved to Castle Square in Warsaw’s Old Town. In June 2022, on the day preceding the Equality Parade, Polish nationalists stopped at the palm tree during a march organised in the name of Roman Dmowski, a co-founder and chief ideologue of the National Democracy movement in Poland. Among the organisers of the march were Piotr Rybak and actor Wojciech Olszański, both known for their nationalistic and anti-Semitic views. During the march, Olszański, mounted on a horse and dressed in a period military uniform, delivered a speech during which he described Rajkowska’s installation as a sign of Polish “national shame” and a “symbol of [foreign] domination.” He demanded the palm tree be removed and replaced with “a great Slavic oak.”

== Public reception, use and appropriation ==
Since its inception, the palm tree location has become a prominent site for political and social activists, including women, nurses, LGBTQ+ communities, environmental activists, protesters against the war in Ukraine and other groups. It has thus been used and appropriated in numerous ways that have departed from its original context of Polish-Jewish history.

In December 2004, the Polish Green Party Zieloni 2004 and the Le Madame club community organised a performance in defence of the project. In the summer of 2007, the installation became a central, symbolic site during a prolonged strike by Polish nurses who protested in their so-called "White Village", a makeshift camp site put up in front of the Polish Prime Minister’s Office. Based on an idea from Polish philosopher, political activist and author Ewa Alicja Majewska, the palm tree was dressed in an oversized nurse’s bonnet as a sign of solidarity and as a message to politicians concerning the oppressive and economically-discriminatory system underpinning their employment.

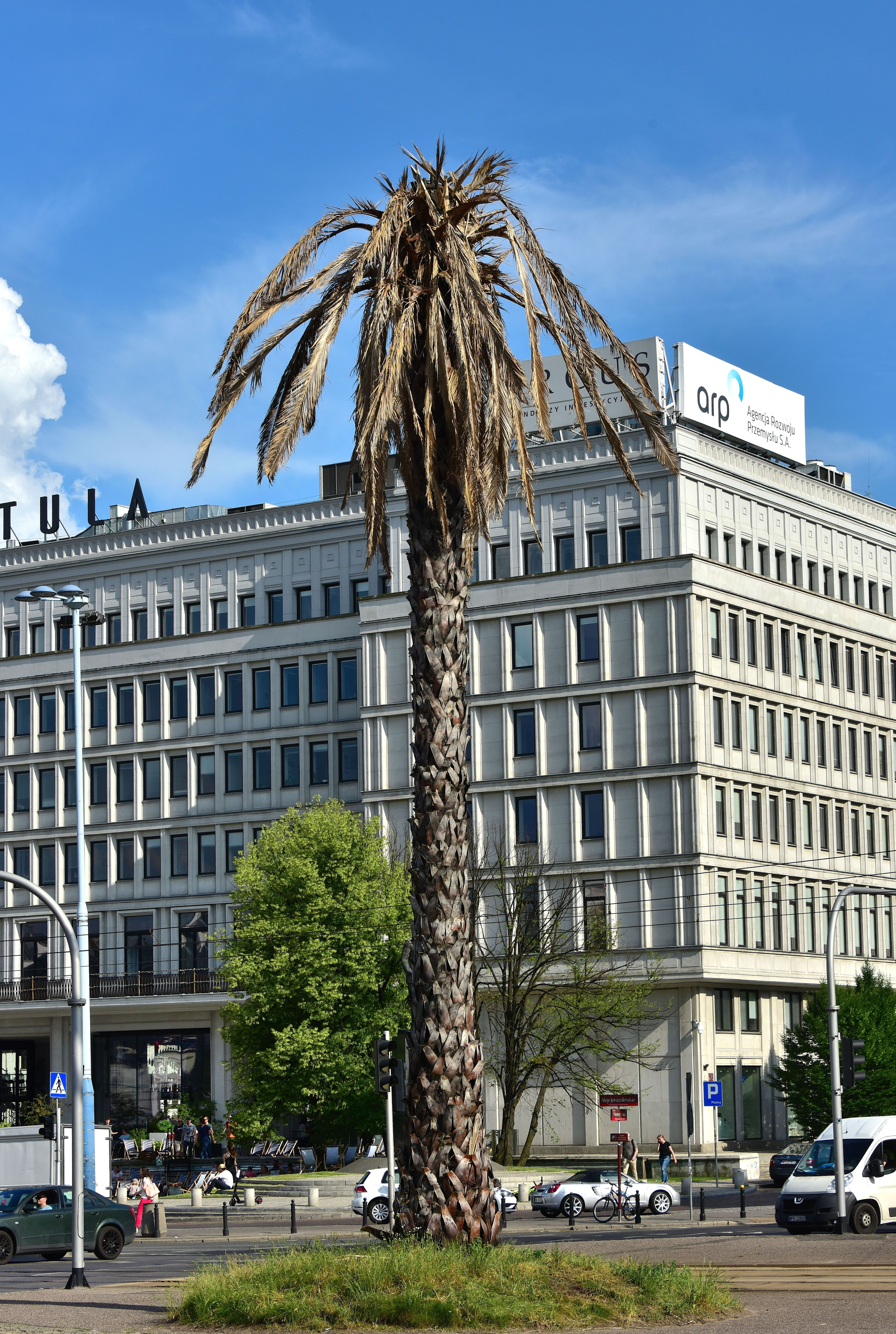
The tree was symbolically altered in 2019 in a reference to climate change

The palm tree has been used on multiple occasions to alert the public to the climate crisis. In 2009, it was used during a Greenpeace protest with a demand for a more decisive stance from the Polish government regarding climate change during the climate conference in Copenhagen. On June 1, 2019 the palm tree symbolically "died": the top was made ash-grey and the leaves were made to look dried out. The transformation (a project commissioned by UNEP/GRID-Warsaw Centre and carried out by the artist in collaboration with Syrena Communications, supported by the Museum of Modern Art in Warsaw) was aimed at drawing attention to air pollution and global climate change as part of various initiatives taken during World Environment Day. Amidst deepening anthropogenic climate change, the exotic tree became a sign of crisis and a warning placed in the very centre of Warsaw.

Greetings from Jerusalem Avenue has also become an important site for both Palestinian and Jewish contexts. At the beginning of 2011, during the Arab Spring, female Polish and Palestinian activists covered the palm tree with a large keffiyeh as a pro-Palestinian act of support. A year later, in February 2012, Rajkowska was asked by the Joint Distribution Committee (JOINT) to run workshops under the palm tree to celebrate Tu BiShvat, the Jewish holiday celebrating the New Year of the Trees.

The installation has also been appropriated in ways that run counter to the artist's intentions. In June 2012, an oversize football was placed next to the palm tree to promote Euro 2012, organised jointly by Poland and Ukraine. As a reaction, a group of anarchists removed most of the leaves and placed a banner reading “Bread not Games” across the tree to expose social problems in Poland and protest the populist use of the project. Numerous private people have used the site as a backdrop for wedding photos, as a tourist destination and for other events.

Greetings from Jerusalem Avenue has also been used in relation to Russian aggression in Ukraine and the refugee crisis on the Polish-Belarus border. In 2014, following Russia's annexation of Crimea and the Euromaidan movement, the palm tree was covered with a large Ukrainian flag to protest Russian aggression. In March 2022 the palm tree was again covered with a Ukrainian flag after Russia invaded Ukraine in late February. Since Autumn 2021, the installation was used as a response to events on the Polish-Belarus border where refugees from Iraq, Afghanistan, Syria, Turkey and other countries were pushed back into Belarus by Polish border forces. In October 2021, the organisations Feminist Fund, Love Does Not Exclude and March 8 Women’s organised a march of solidarity with the refugees who were trapped and dying on the border. Many participants carried thermal blankets as a symbol of their support for the “No human is illegal” slogan. There was also a green light installed on the palm tree’s trunk as a sign of hospitality towards the refugees, and Sebastian Cichocki wrote a letter from the palm tree to people (the so-called Palm Tree Letter) in which the palm tree made links between human suffering and death in various forests during both the Second World War and at the present moment. The Polish and English versions of the letter were placed in the window of Palmiarnia, causing outrage and criticism in right-wing circles.

The installation has also become a major site of pro-democratic demonstrations in Poland after the right-wing political party Law and Justice came to power in 2015. On November 11, 2019, during nation-wide protests against the gradual dismantling of the democratic system, a huge banner with a sign “Konstytucja” was placed on the palm tree by the informal civic movement Obywatele RP (Citizens of Poland) only to be almost immediately taken down by the police. In November 2020, after a series of "Black Protests" that followed a proposed abortion ban in 2016 and the decision of the Constitutional Tribunal to declare abortions of malformed foetuses unconstitutional, numerous Polish women told their abortion coming out stories in front of the installation.

In June 2018, during the Equality Parade in Warsaw, the art collective Czarne szmaty (Black Rags) staged a happening in front of the palm tree. Four members, dressed in bathing suits, performatively claimed the site for several hours by renaming it the island of “Lesbos” while reading poems by Sapho, Elizabeth Bishop and Adrienne Rich.

Since 2019, Greetings from Jerusalem Avenue has also become a regular meeting point for the grassroots political organisation Polskie Babcie (Polish Grandmas). Polskie Babcie advocate for the defence of the democratic system in Poland, including reproductive rights and LGBTQ+ rights, and criticise Law and Justice policies. Every Thursday at 4:30 pm, they picket in front of the tree, and engage in conversations with passers-by.

== See also ==
- History of the Jews in Poland
- Warsaw Ghetto
