= Rosa's Passage =

Art installation in Poland

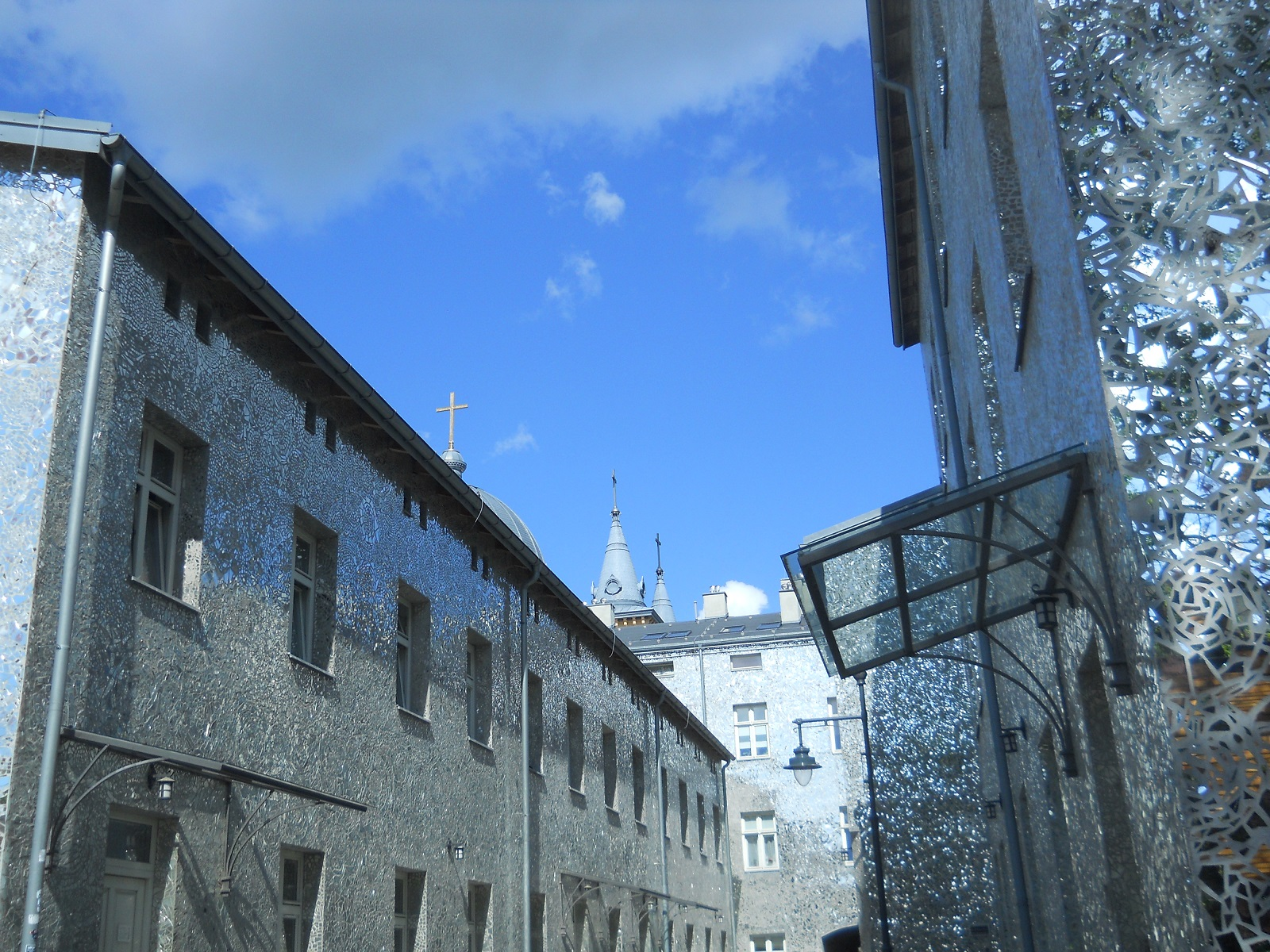
- Artist: Joanna Rajkowska
- Year: 2014
- Location: Łodz

Rosa's Passage (Polish: Pasaż Róży) is an art installation by Joanna Rajkowska which covered the courtyard of the tenement house at 3 Piotrkowska Street in Łódź with mirrors.

== Description ==
The courtyard of Antoni Engel's tenement house (pl) at 3 Piotrkowska Street was decorated with a mosaic of cut mirrors in various shapes. The project was carried out as part of the Łódź of Four Cultures Festival (pl) in 2014 and was created by Joanna Rajkowska. The mirror elements create figures resembling roses. The name of the passage also refers to the artist's daughter, who was diagnosed with retinoblastoma. The installation took two years to build.

== Gallery ==
Video of the installation (October 2015)

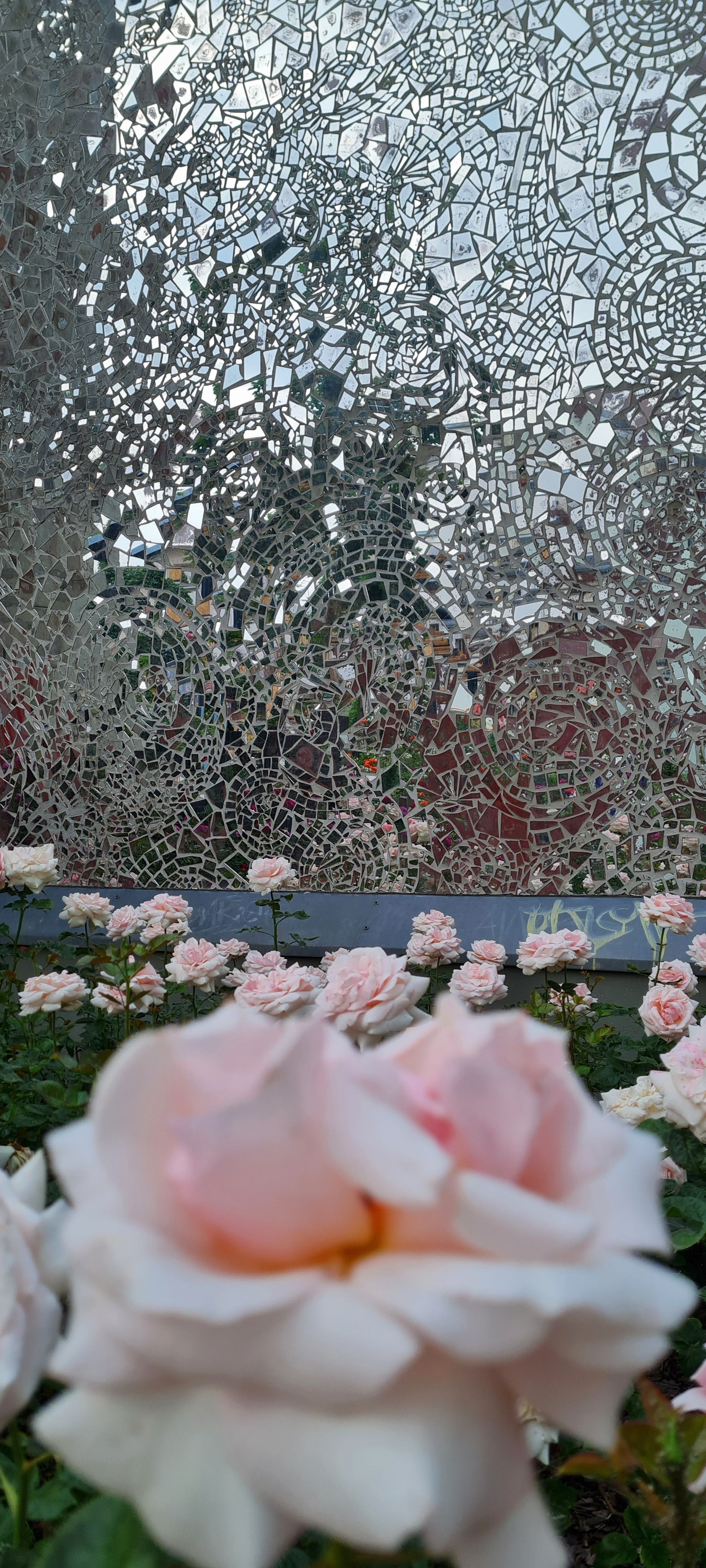
Roses at the installation (June 2023)

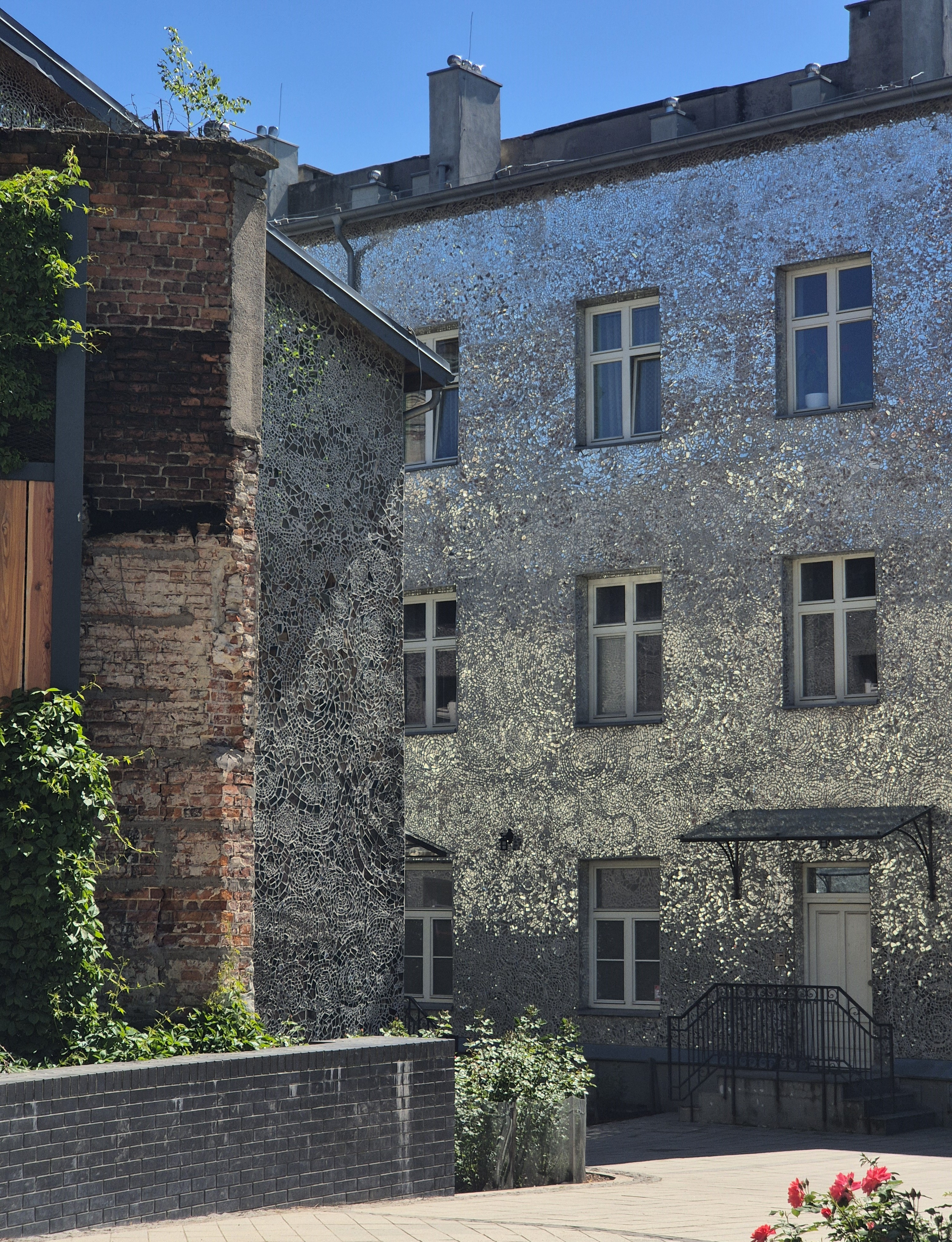
View of the installation (May 2024)

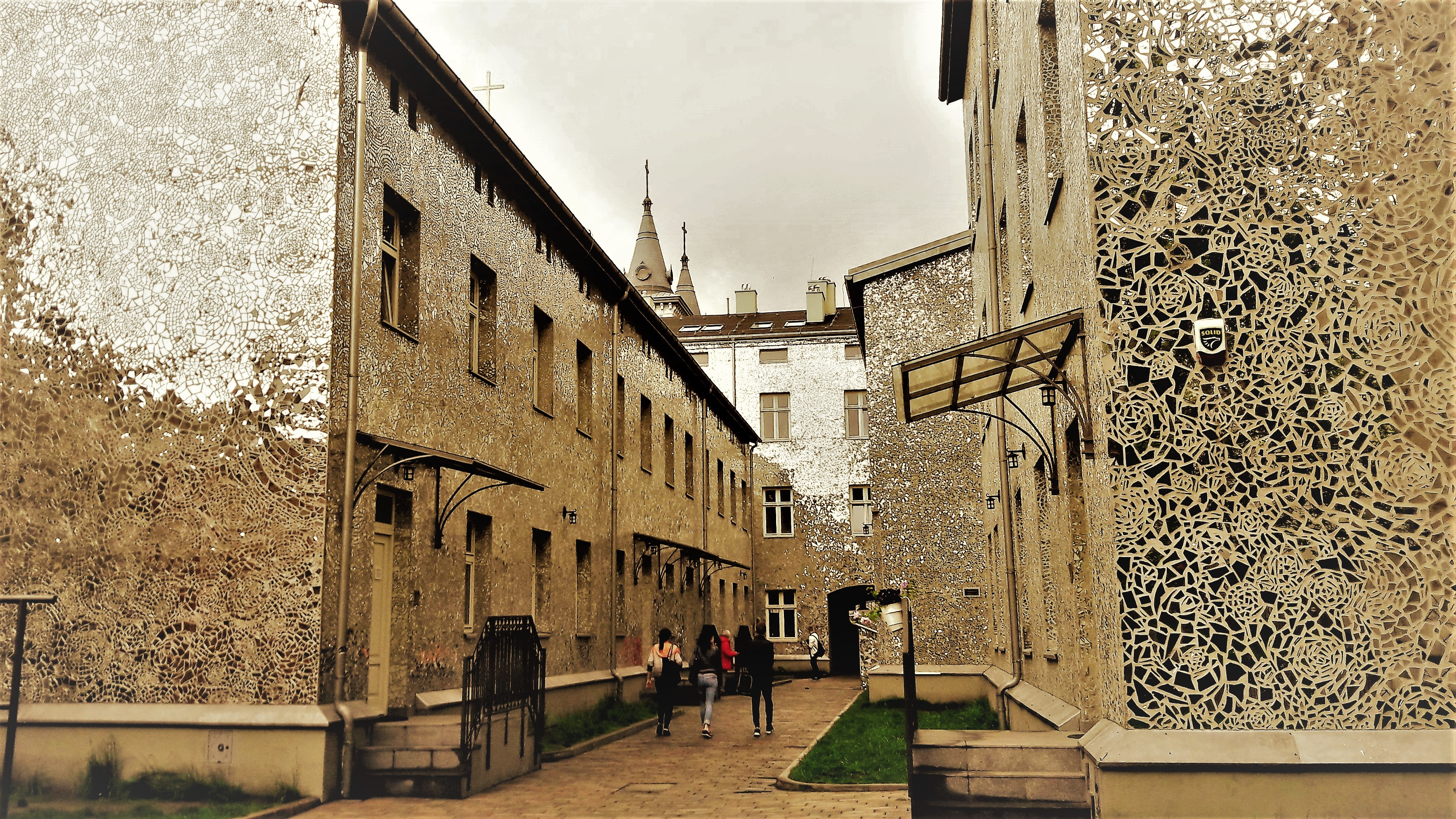
View of the street (May 2017)
