= Jerusalem Avenue, Warsaw =

Street in Warsaw, Poland

Coordinates: 52°13′48″N 21°00′42″E

Jerusalem Avenue Aleje Jerozolimskie
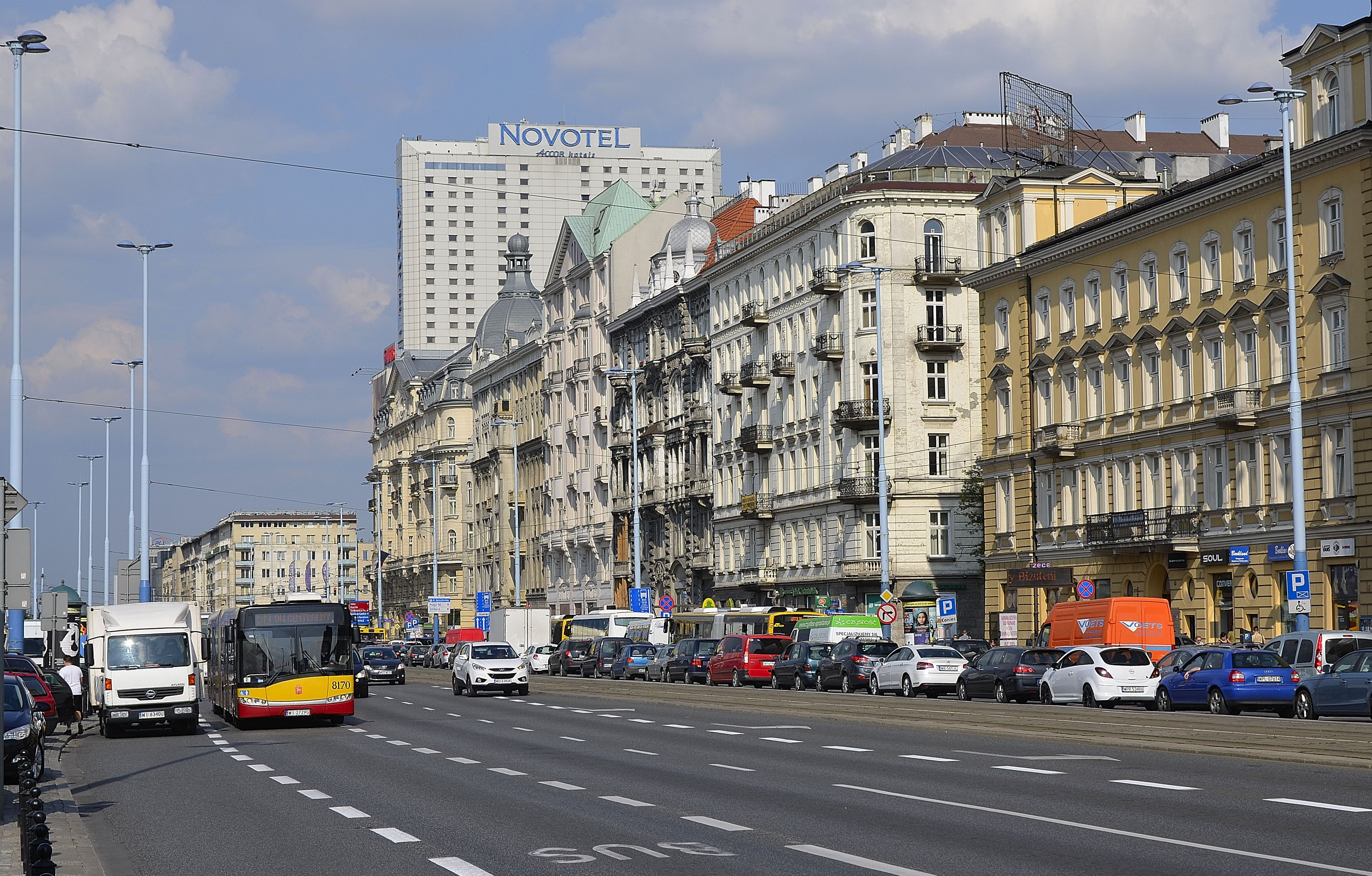
- Jerusalem Avenue
- Interactive map of Jerusalem Avenue; Aleje Jerozolimskie
- Namesake: Jerusalem
- Length: 10 km (6.2 mi)
- Area: Śródmieście, Warsaw
- Location: Warsaw
- Quarter: Skorosze, Salomea, Stare Włochy, Raków, Szczęśliwice, Ochota, Filtry, Śródmieście Południowe, Śródmieście Północne, Mirów
- Nearest metro station: Centrum
- Major junctions: rondo gen. Ch. de Gaulle’a

Other
- Known for: Greetings from Jerusalem Avenue

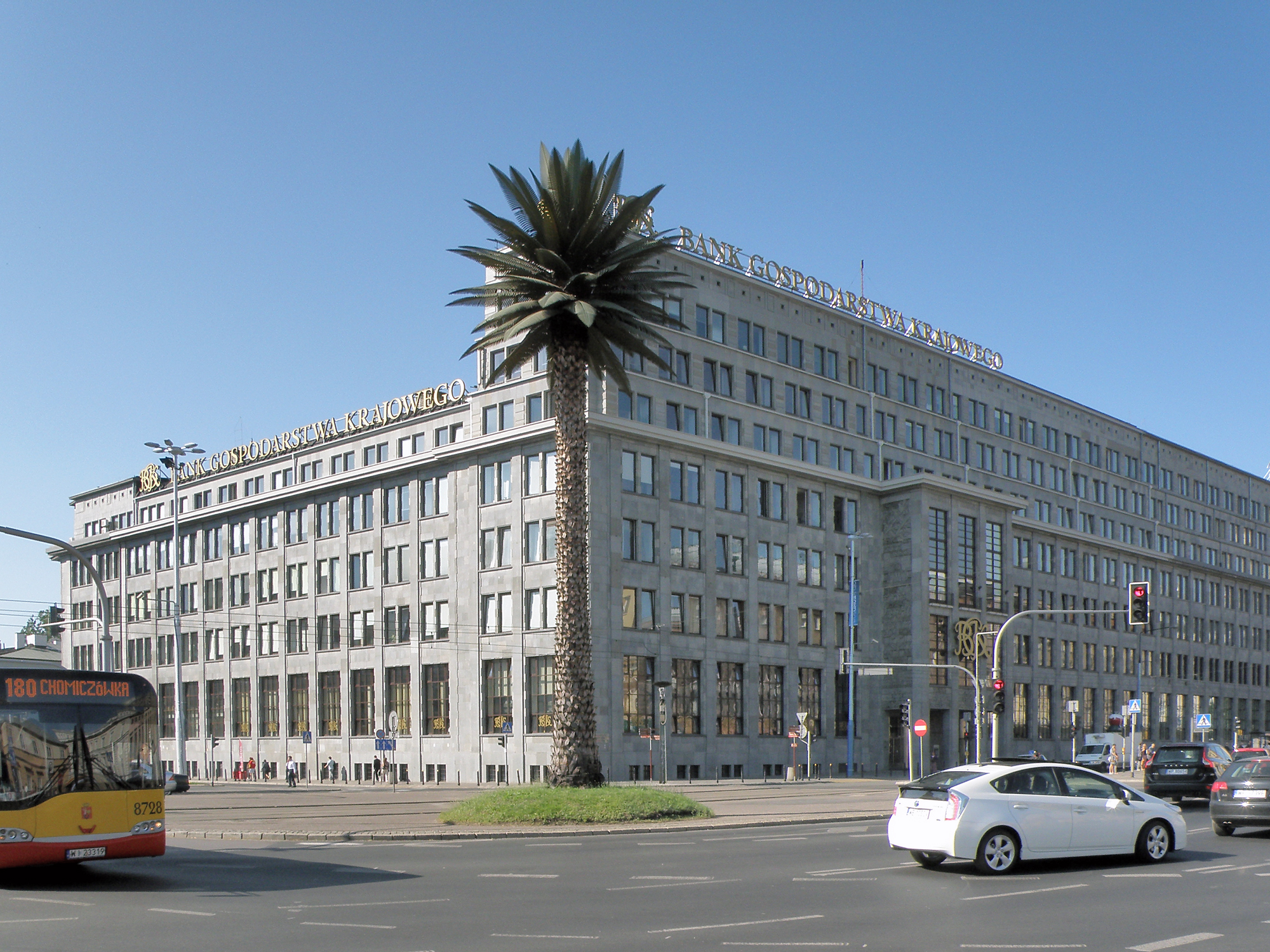
An artificial palm tree by Joanna Rajkowska in front of the modernist BGK bank

Jerusalem Avenue (Polish: Aleje Jerozolimskie) is one of the principal streets of the capital city of Warsaw in Poland. It runs through the City Centre along the east–west axis, linking the western boroughs of Wola and Ochota with the bridge on the Vistula River and the borough of Praga-Południe on the other side of the river.

== History ==
The name of the street comes from a small village erected in 1774 by prince and marshal August Sułkowski for the Jewish settlers in Mazovia. The name of the village was Nowa Jerozolima (New Jerusalem), and the road to Warsaw was named Aleja Jerozolimska (singular, as opposed to the modern Polish name, which is plural). The village was established despite an antisemitic law which forbade Jews from living within a two-mile radius of Old Warsaw. A lawsuit was brought against Sulkowsi and the neighborhood was destroyed on 23 January 1776. The Jewish community was expelled, their houses torn down, and their belongings confiscated.

It was there that the first railway station in Warsaw was built. In the late 19th century, the easternmost part of it became one of the most representative—and the most expensive—areas of the ever-growing city. In the early 20th century, and especially after Poland regained its independence in 1918, the street was extended westwards, and the borough of Wola was eventually incorporated into the city.

Under the Nazi regime, the name was changed to Bahnofstrasse. Most of the houses along the avenue, including priceless examples of Art Nouveau and modernist architecture, were destroyed during the systematic destruction of the city by Nazi German forces in the aftermath of the Warsaw Uprising.

After World War II, the Stalinist regime demolished what was left of the buildings, and since then the northern side of the street is currently dominated by the gigantic Palace of Culture and Science and the Warszawa Centralna railway station. The only surviving blocks of pre-war architecture are located to the south of the street, including the historic Hotel Polonia Palace and the Hoserów townhouse apartment building at 51 Jerusalem which host the Warsaw Fotoplastikon vintage stereoscopic theatre in its courtyard. Halfway down the street, at the junction with Krucza and Bracka streets, Warsaw's original main post-war department store, CDT 'Smyk' is located.

In 2002, Jewish-Polish artist Joanna Rajkowska created a memorial of the area's Jewish community. She struggled to find funders who were willing to take on the project, and her initial request for permission to install the piece was denied. The piece, Greetings from Jerusalem Avenue, is a 15-metre tall replica palm tree that was inspired by a trip the artist took to Jerusalem.

== Images ==
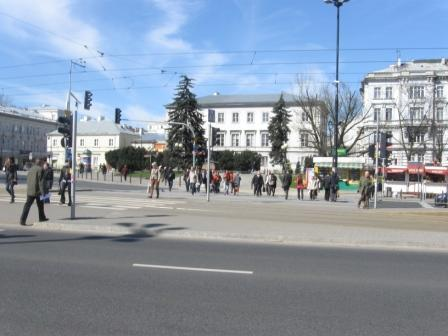
View on the Smolna street from Rondo de Gaulle'a and Nowy Świat Street

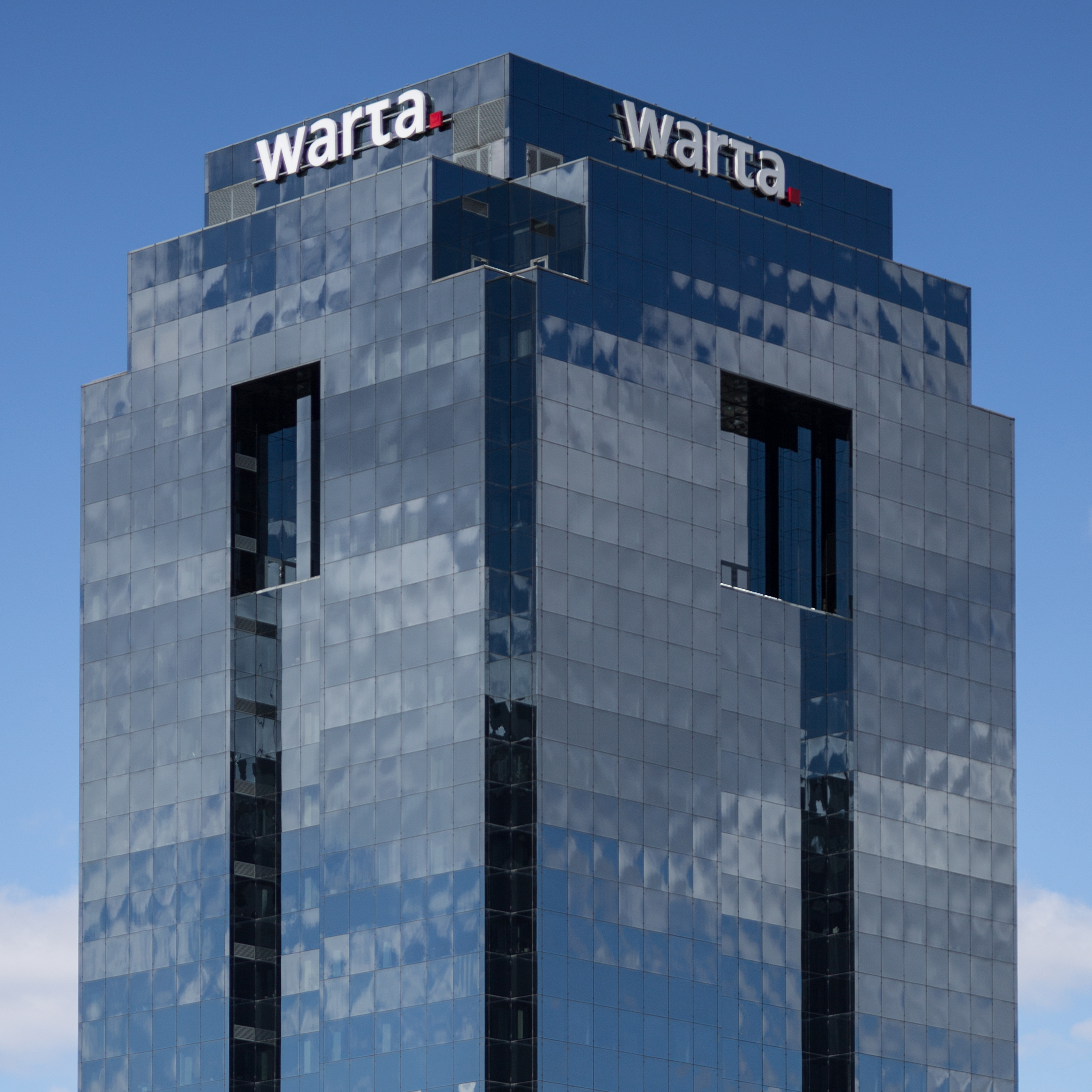
Warta Tower

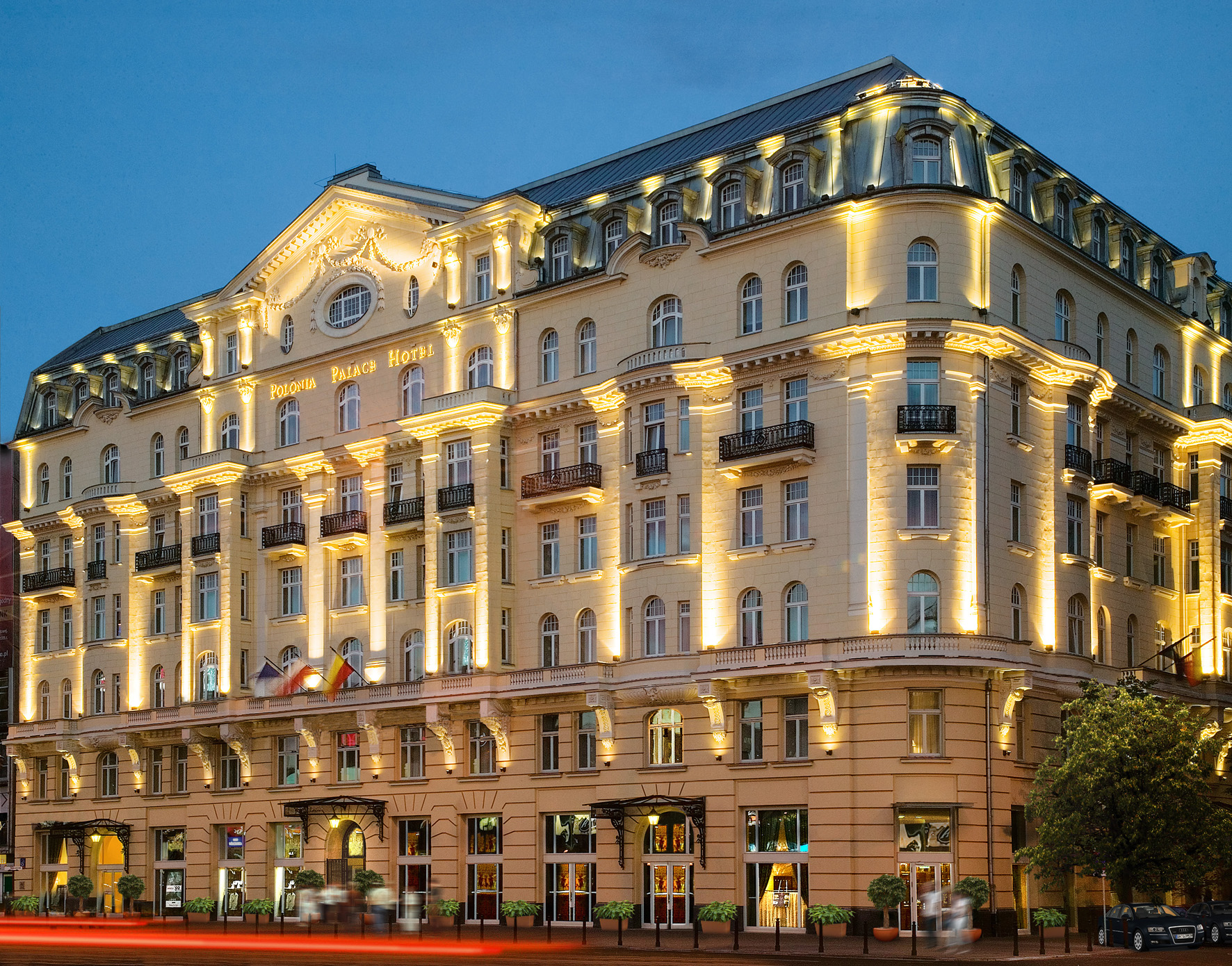
Hotel Polonia Palace

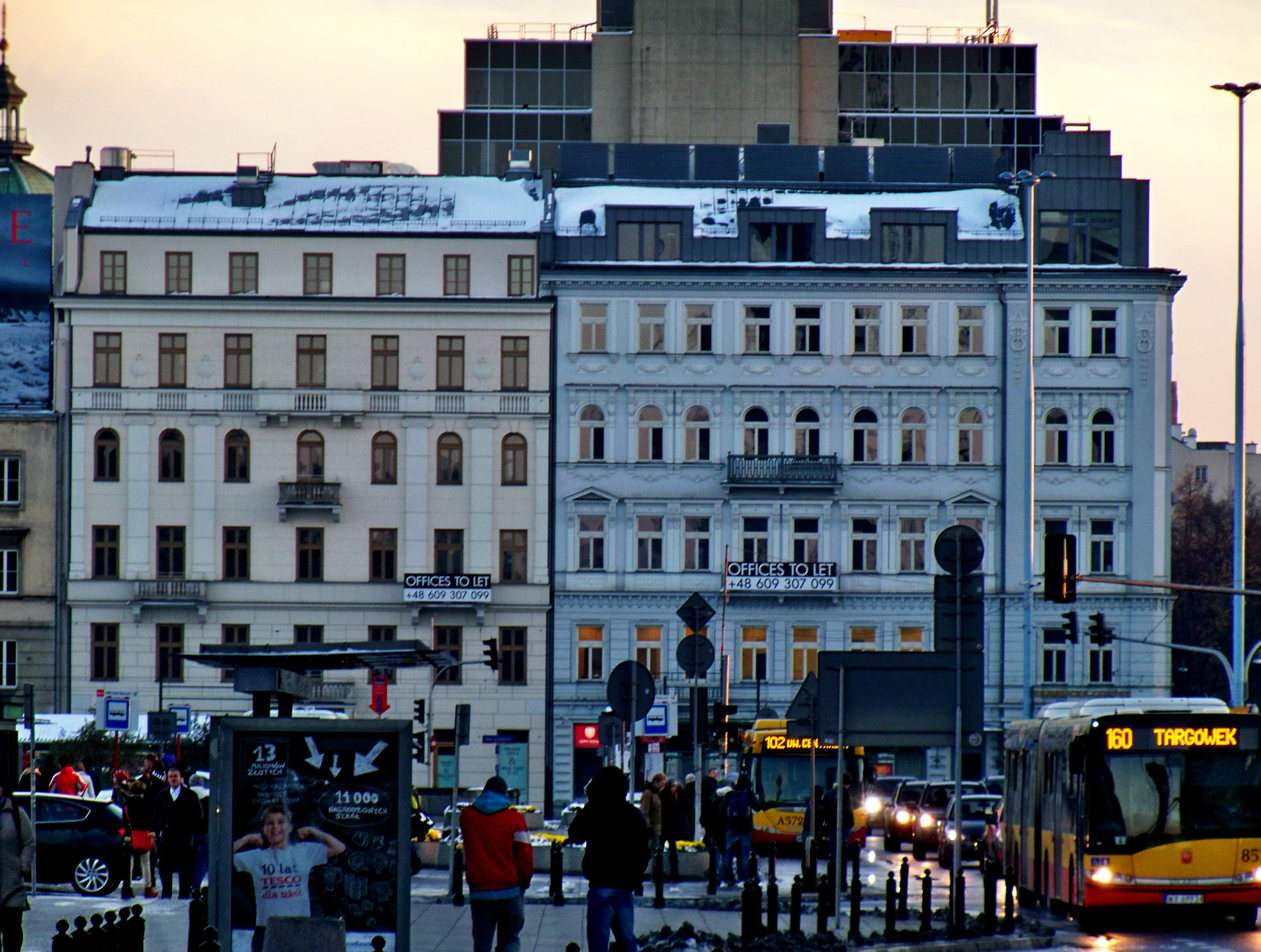
61 & 63 Jerusalem Avenue

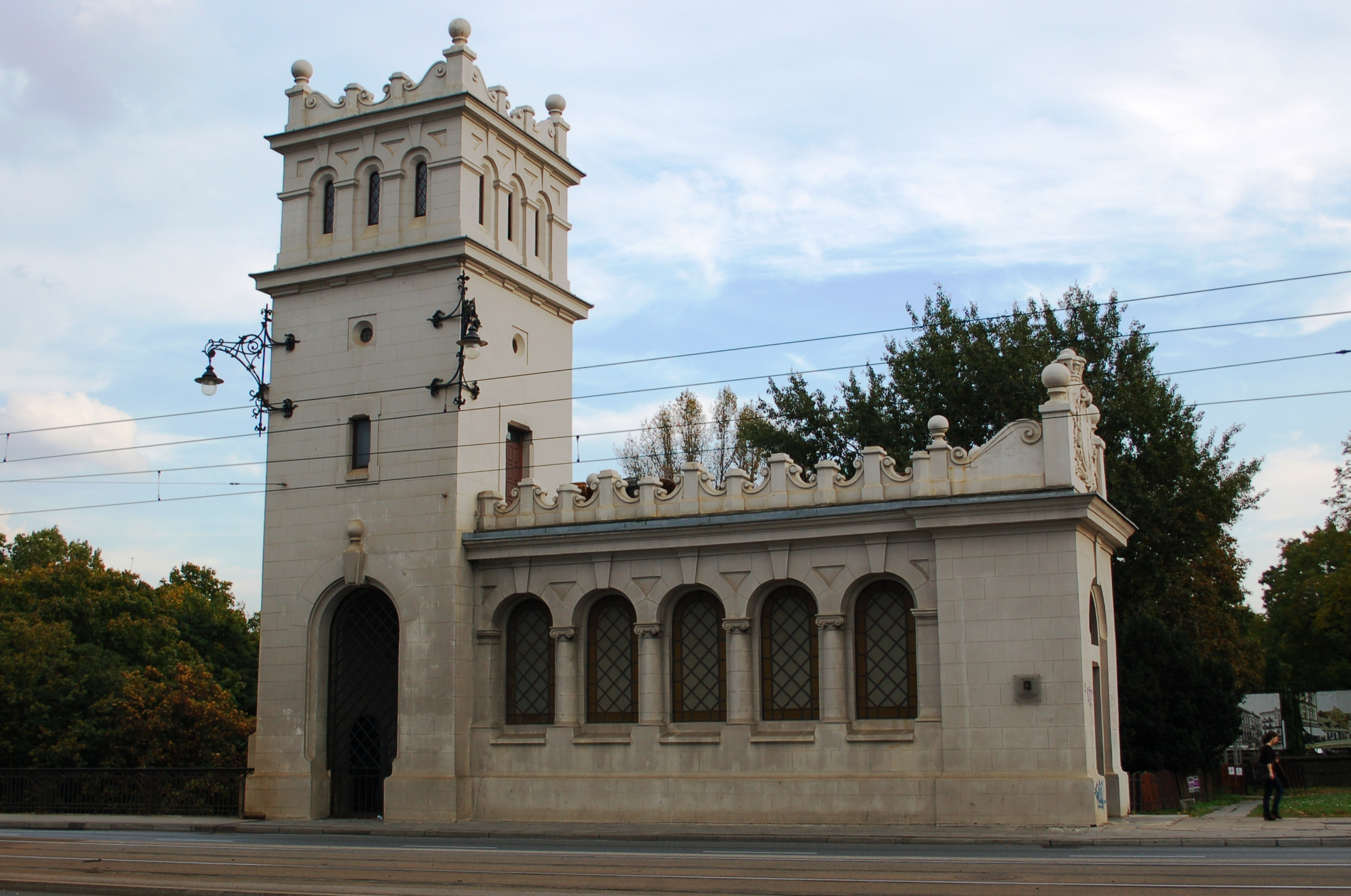
Poniatowski Bridge

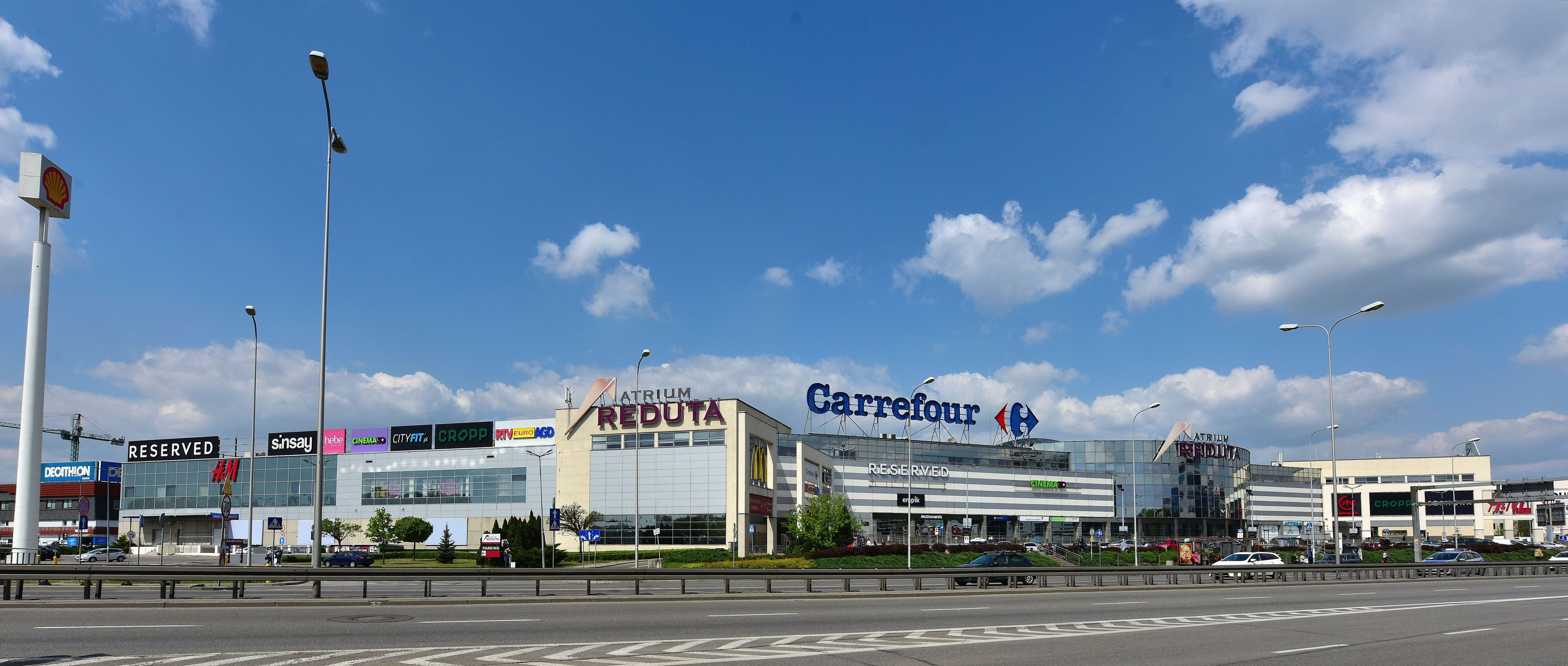
Atrium Reduta Mall

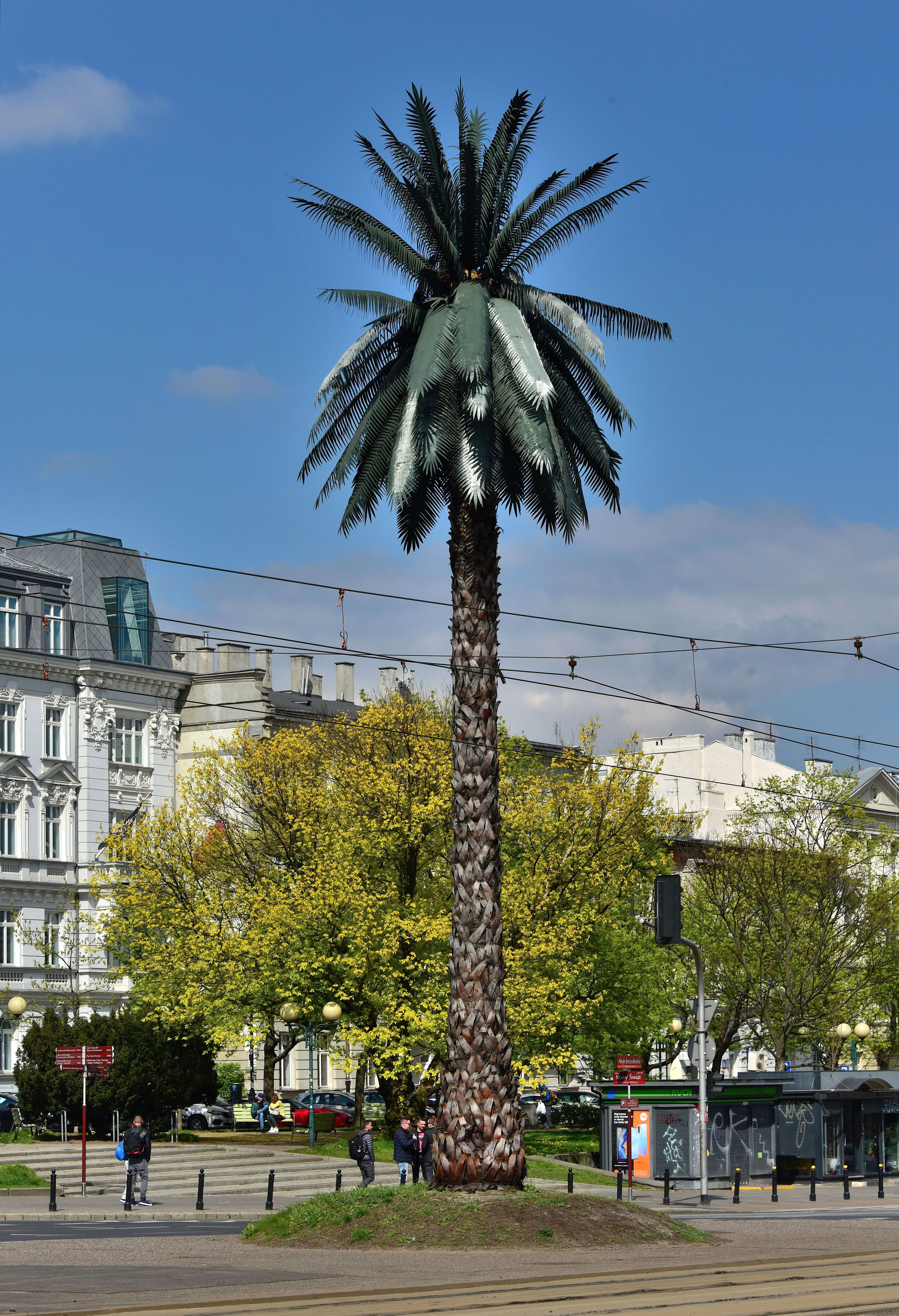
Greetings from Jerusalem Avenue, Joanna Rajkowska, 2002.
