= Hotel Polonia Palace =

Hotel in Warsaw, Poland

Polonia Palace Hotel
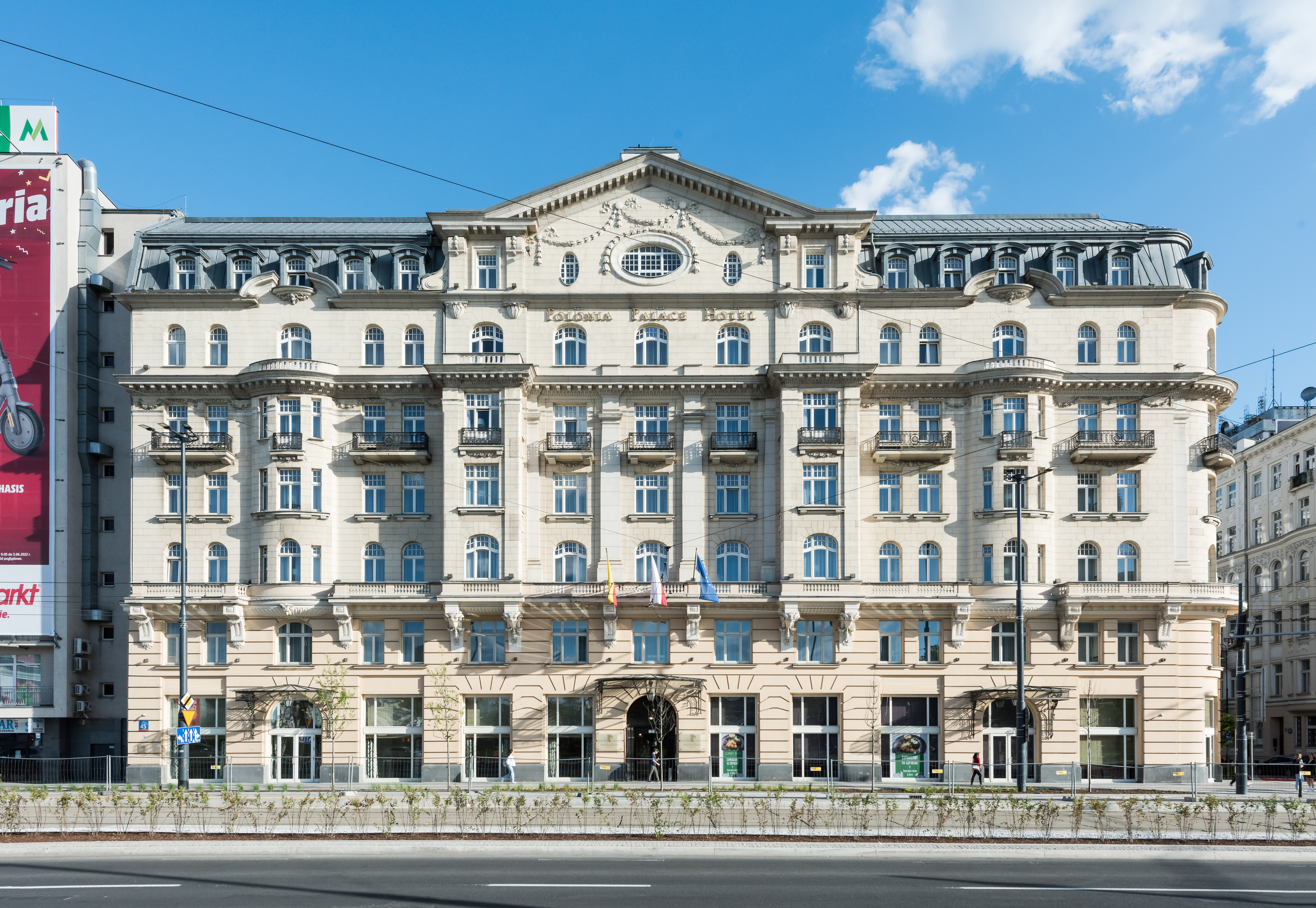
- Hotel Polonia Palace (2022)
- Interactive map of the Polonia Palace Hotel area

General information
- Location: Warsaw, Poland, Aleje Jerozolimskie 45
- Coordinates: 52°13′45.9″N 21°0′38.4″E
- Opening: July 14, 1913
- Owner: Syrena Hotel Group

Design and construction
- Architect: Juliusz Nagórski
- Developer: Konstanty Przedziecki

Other information
- Number of rooms: 206

Website
- www.poloniapalace.com

The Polonia Palace Hotel is a historic four-star hotel opened in 1913 and located in the heart of Warsaw on Jerusalem Avenue. It is the capital’s second oldest hotel after the Hotel Bristol, Warsaw. Together with the adjacent Metropol Hotel and the MDM Hotel, it is managed by the Syrena Hotel Group. It was declared an architectural monument of Poland's history and culture on July 1, 1965.

== History ==
=== Prewar ===
The Polonia Palace Hotel was developed by Count Konstanty Przedziecki, a member of one of Poland's oldest aristocratic families, whose grandfather Aleksander had constructed the nearby Hotel Europejski. The name Polonia Palace was chosen during the Period of Partition to have a strong patriotic element.

The hotel had a Parisian design with a mansard roof, a structure in the Beaux Arts style designed by Juliusz Nagórski, and interiors in the Louis XVI style designed by Józef Holewiński. It opened on July 14, 1913 and featured hot and cold running water and dial telephones in each of 160 rooms, though only six rooms had private bathrooms. It also included an attached garage, men's and ladies' hair salons, an extensive wine cellar and a laundry on-site. The hotel was located across from the Vienna Station, until that building was demolished in 1919. Later it was across from the new Warsaw Central Station, which was ultimately destroyed in World War II.

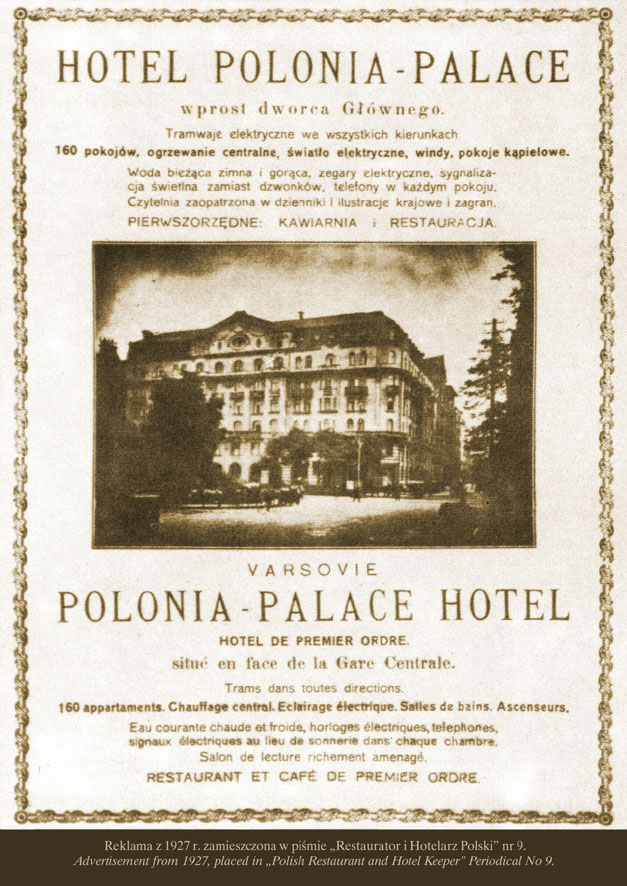
Advertisement from 1927

The hotel was expanded in 1924, with a new wing that included a dancehall where Rolf Roy, a well-known Viennese dancer, was appointed as its artistic manager. In 1925, a ball of dramatists and playwrights was held at the hotel, attended by such artists as Jan Lechoń, Stefan Żeromski, Ludwik Solski, Kornel Makuszyński, Maria Pawlikowska, Józef Węgrzyn and Tadeusz Boy-Żeleński. In 1927, the painter Kazimir Malevich held his first foreign exhibition outside the Soviet Union at the hotel. King Amanullah Khan of Afghanistan visited the hotel in 1929, when officials of the Second Republic of Poland honored him with the Order of the White Eagle. The author of ‘Flirt z Melpomeną’ (Flirting with Melpomena) and ‘Piekło kobiet’ (Women’s Hell) celebrated his jubilee, organized by the PEN Club, at the hotel. Jan Kiepura performed at the hotel. The Polish Arts Club operated from the hotel. In 1931 the Pre-Academic School of Hotel Management, established by the Naczelna Organizacja Polskiego Przemysłu Hotelarskiego (the General Organization of Polish Hotel Industry) opened at the Polonia Palace. The hotel became a favorite spot for meetings and the accommodation of diplomats and aristocrats, who would celebrate winter and ‘green’ carnivals there.

The hotel was used by the German military during World War II, when it was renamed Hotel Der Reichshof and accommodated German officers. It served as a hospital and supply base during the Warsaw Uprising and miraculously survived the almost complete destruction of the city of Warsaw.

=== Diplomatic Missions and Consulates (1945-1951) ===
The hotel re-opened on April 13, 1945. General Dwight David Eisenhower stayed at the hotel in 1945 for a victory banquet, greeted by huge crowds of cheering Varsovians. General Charles de Gaulle was also a guest that year.

At that time, Polonia Palace was the best surviving hotel in Warsaw and many diplomatic representatives had their offices there.

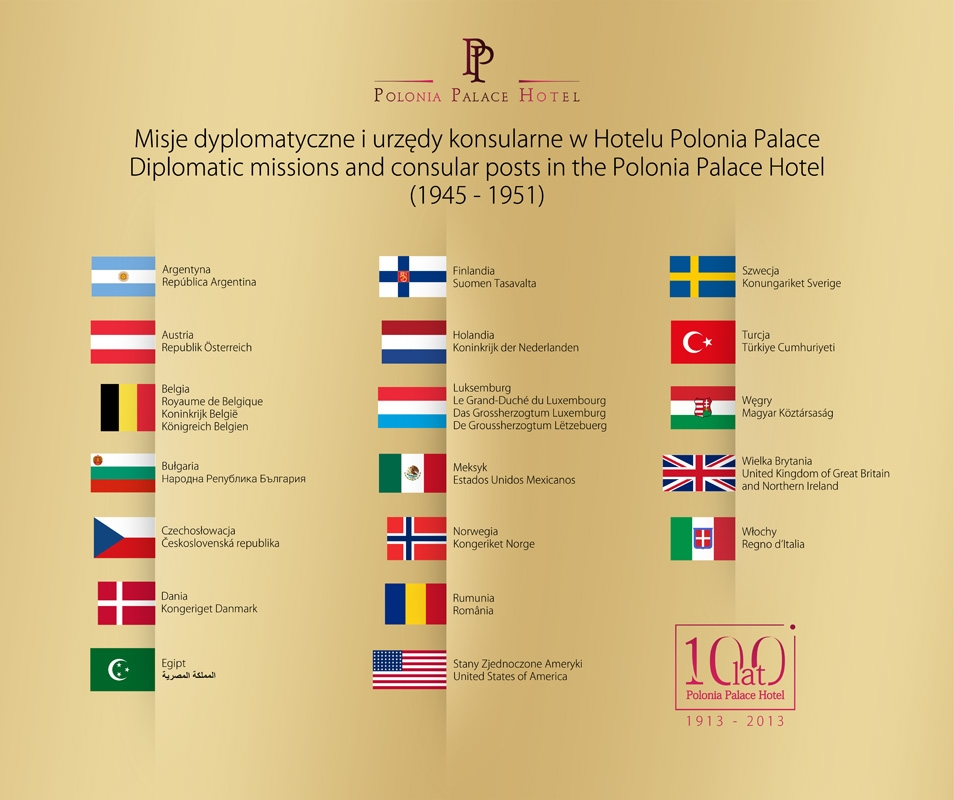
Memorial plaque

- Argentine Republic (1947-1948)
- Republic of Austria (1947-1948)
- Kingdom of Belgium (1946-1951)
- People's Republic of Bulgaria (1946-1948)
- Republic of Czechoslovakia (1946-1948)
- Kingdom of Denmark (1945-1948)
- Kingdom of Egypt (1946-1951)
- Republic of Finland (1946-1948)
- Kingdom of the Netherlands (1946-1948)
- Grand Duchy of Luxembourg (1946-1949)
- United Mexican States (1946-1947)
- Kingdom of Norway (1946-1947)
- Republic of Turkey (1947-1949)
- Hungarian Republic (1947-1949)
- United Kingdom of Great Britain and Ireland (1946)
- Romania (3 names of the country within that period of time) (1946-1950)
- Kingdom of Italy 1946
- United States of America (1946-1948)
- Kingdom of Sweden 1945

=== Post-war era ===
The hotel was renamed the Hotel Polonia during the Communist era. Chinese Premier Zhou Enlai visited the hotel for a banquet in 1953. In 1955, during the Fifth International Chopin Piano Competition, the entire fourth floor was emptied and refurnished with over a dozen pianos for the competitors, including Adam Harasiewicz. The Hotel Metropol was built next to the Polonia in 1965, and the two hotels operated together. The Polonia was made a protected monument on July 1, 1965 and renovated in 1968-1973. Plans had originally called for the hotel's historic interiors to be gutted and completely modernized, but due to financial shortages, the work was not carried out and the original interiors survived.

The hotel hosted congresses of technicians, steelworkers, and unions, and events like the a book fair. Its guests included representatives from the national football team like Zbigniew Boniek, Grzegorz Lato and Jan Tomaszewski and popular artists and bands like ‘Skaldowie’, ‘Czerwone Gitary’ and Poznańskie Słowiki.

In 1974, the state-owned Syrena Hotel Group was established, owning the Hotel Polonia and the adjoining Hotel Metropol.

=== Today ===
In 1997, Syrena was bought by an Austrian group for $24 million. They closed the Hotel Polonia in 2001 for a lengthy restoration, costing €30 million. The hotel reopened as the Hotel Polonia Palace on March 31, 2005. It was again renovated in 2010.

== Gallery ==
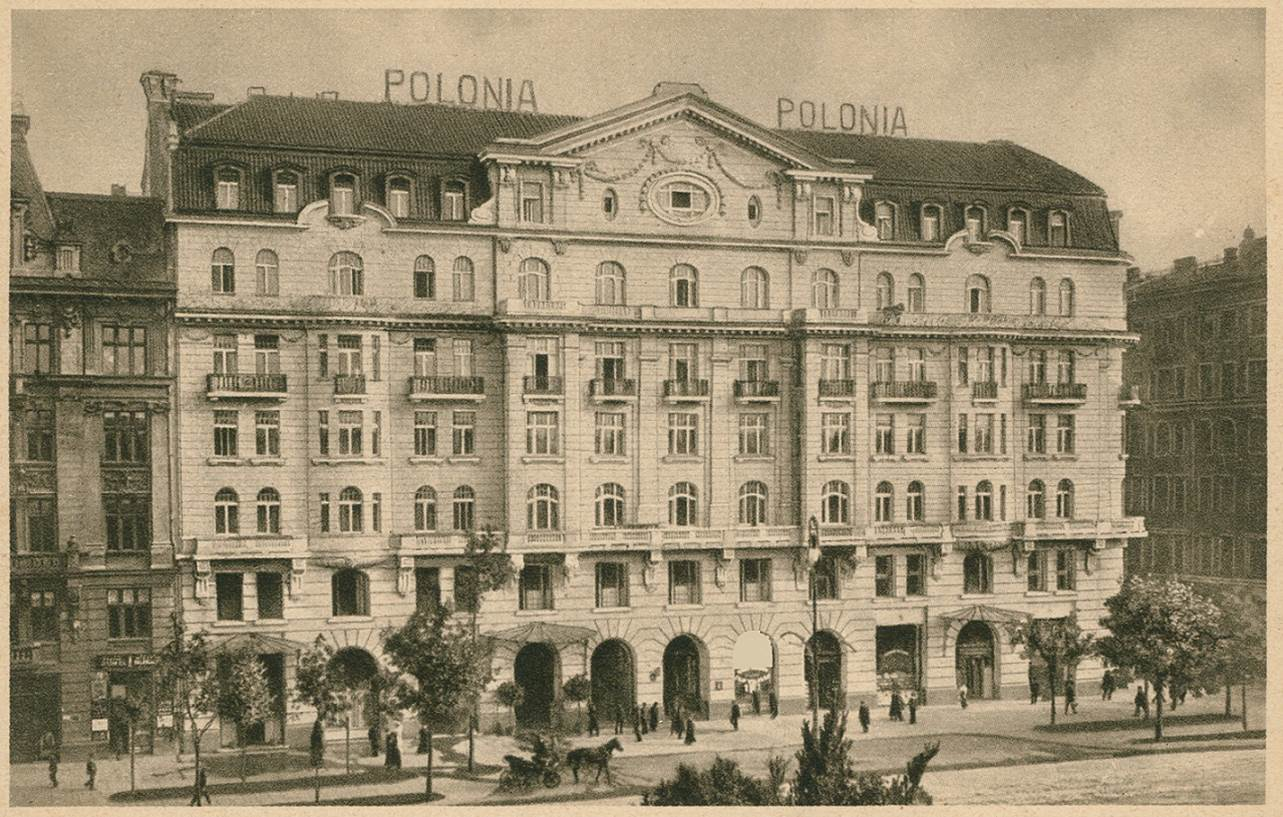
Hotel Polonia Palace, 1920s

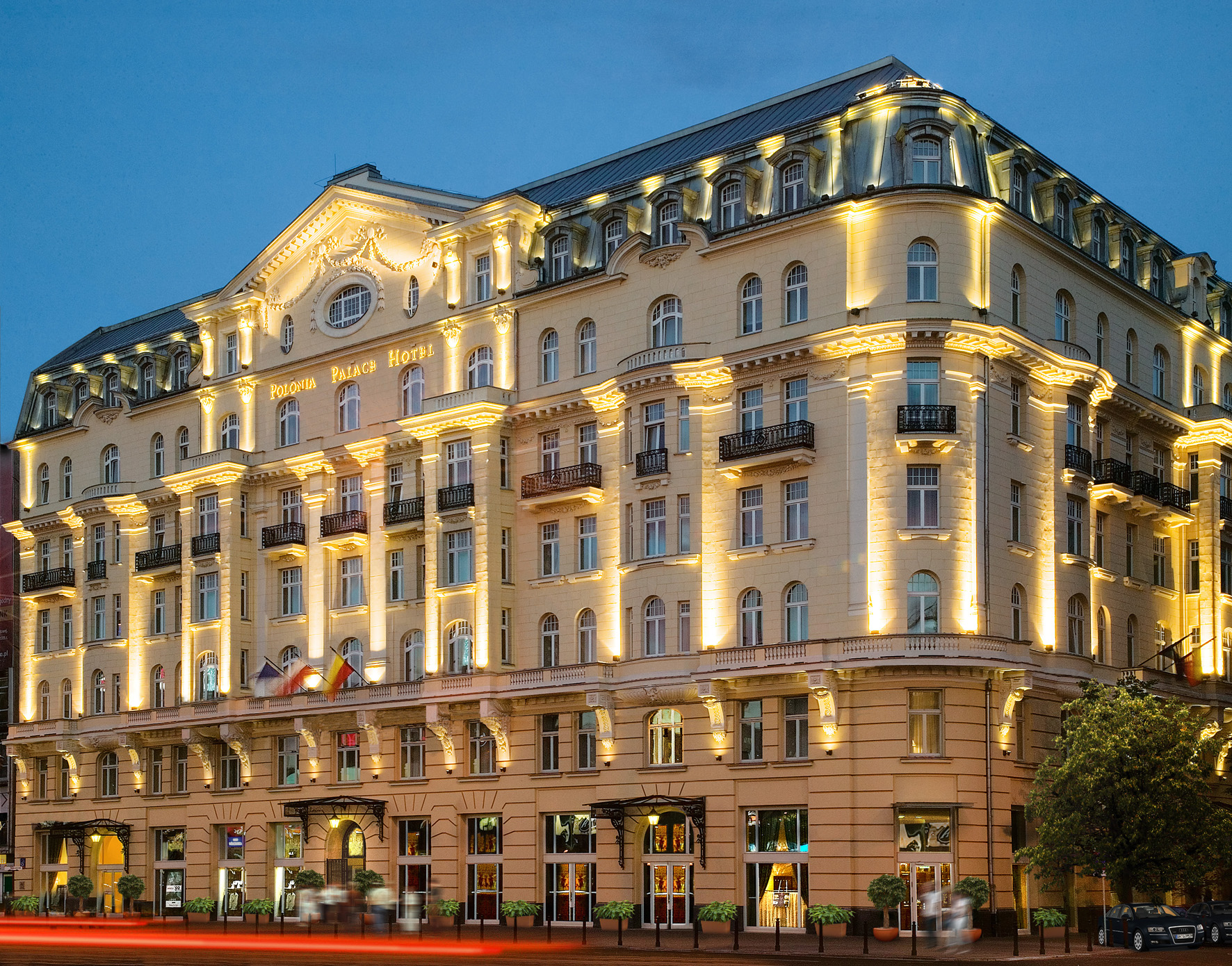
Hotel Polonia Palace today

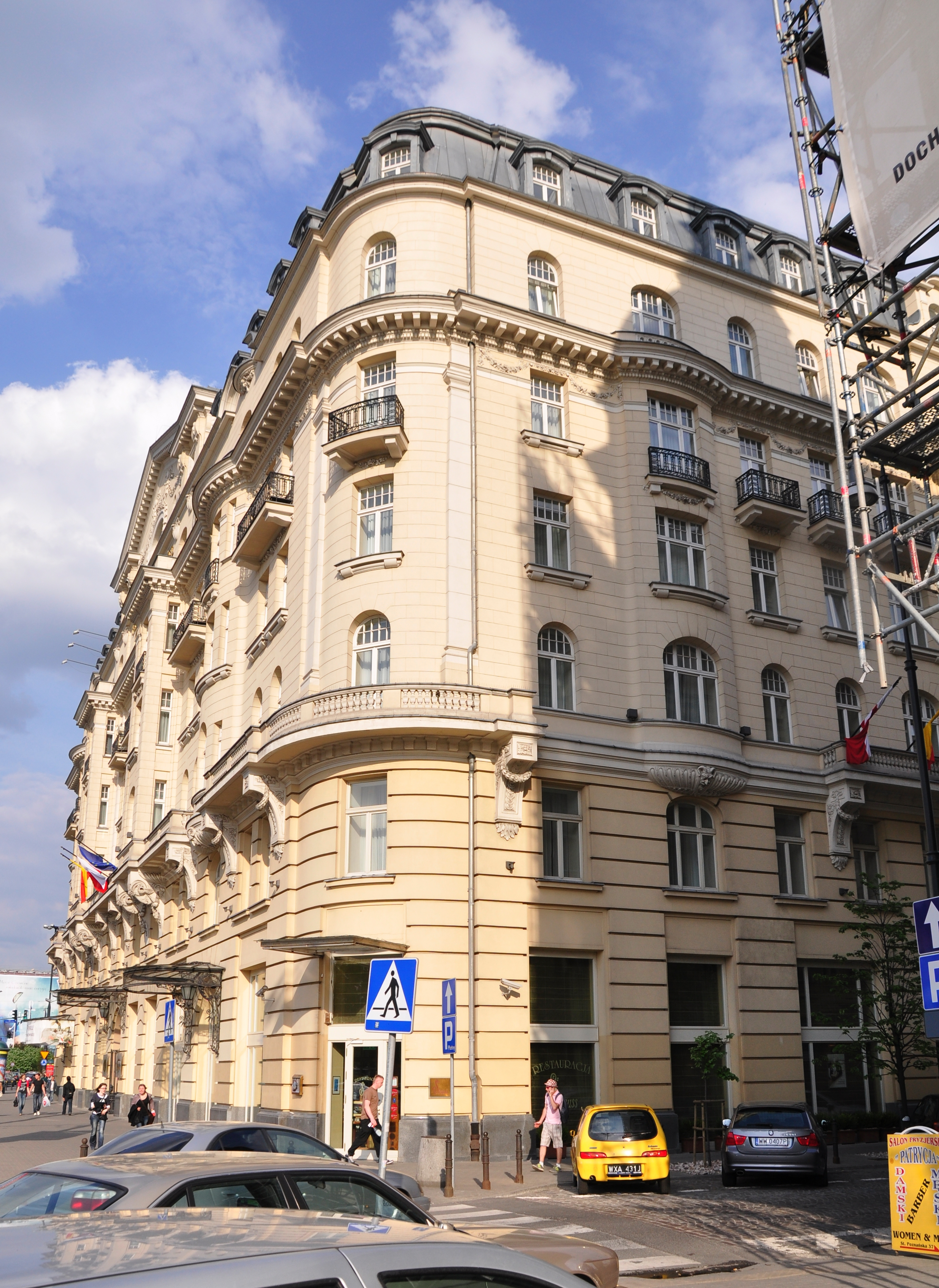
Hotel Polonia Palace

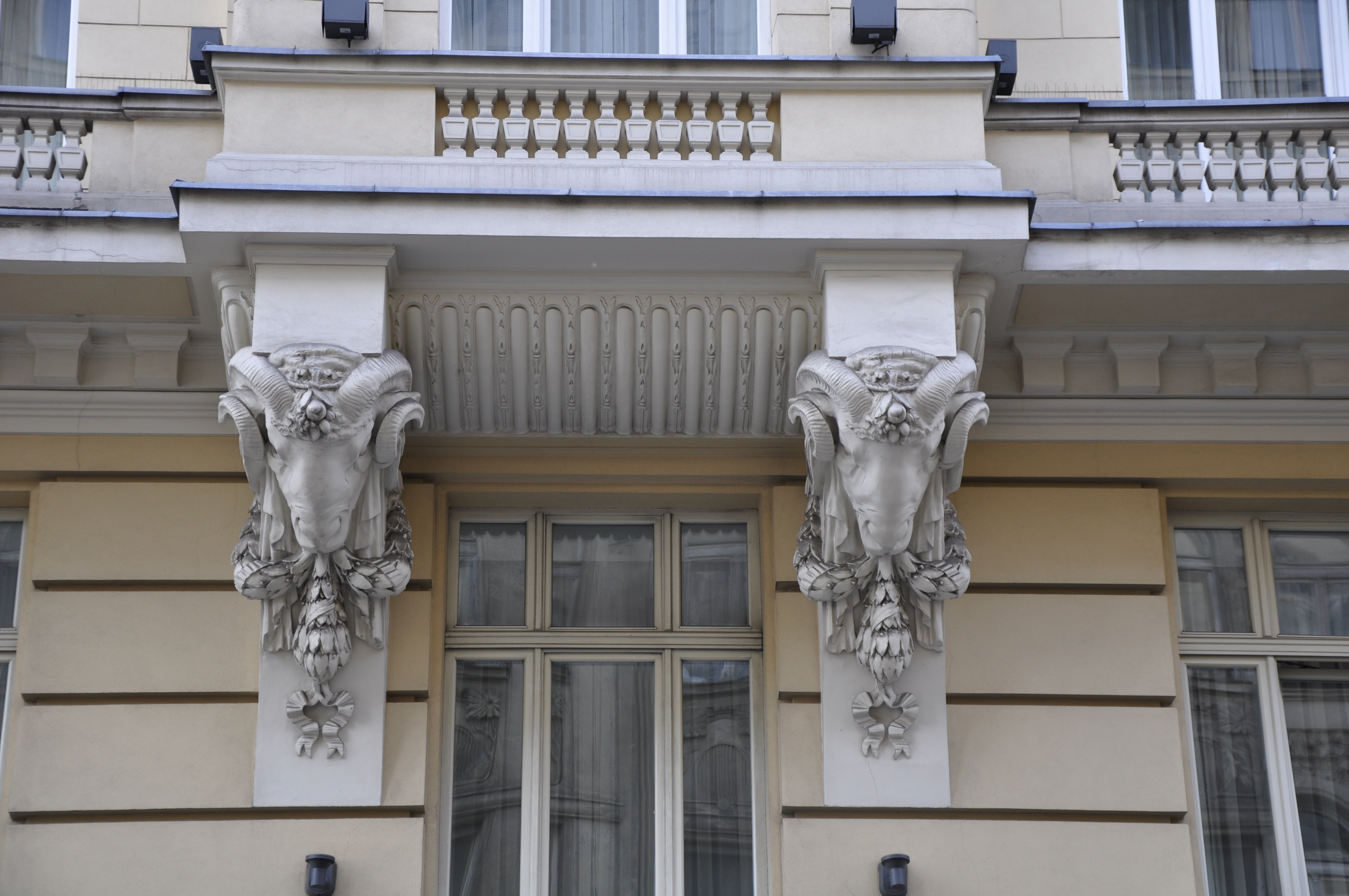
Hotel Polonia Palace detail

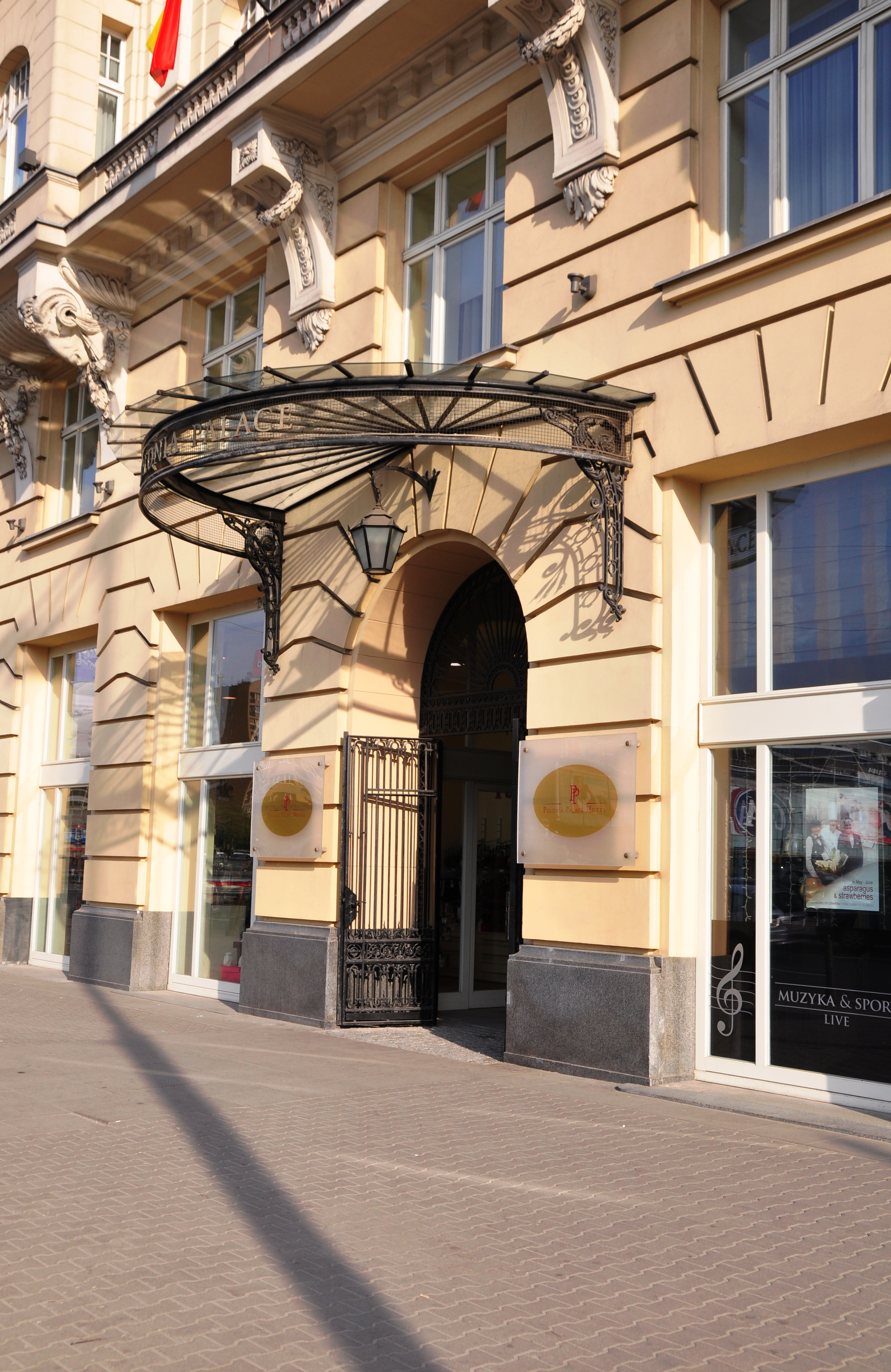
Hotel Polonia Palace, main entrance

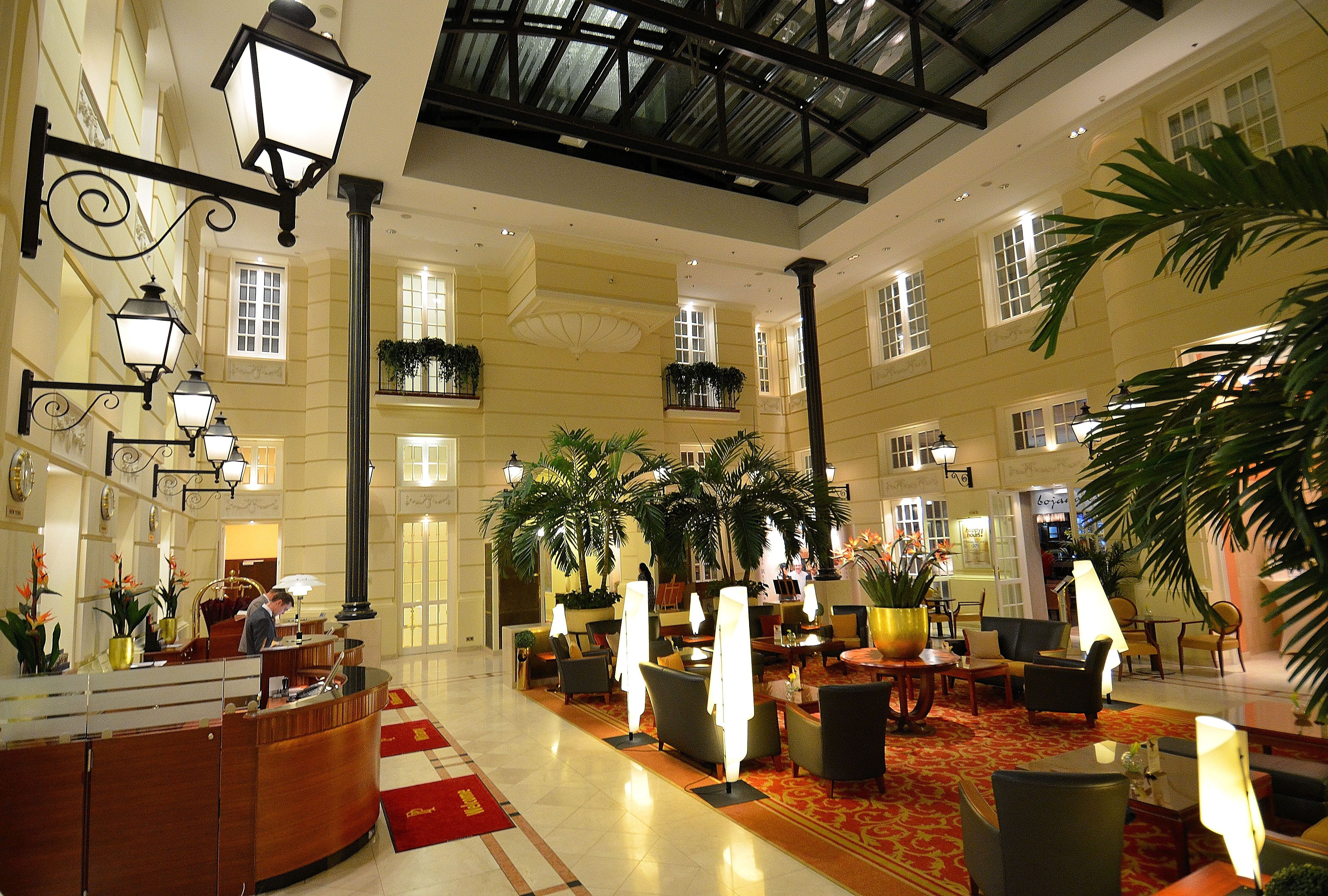
Hotel Polonia Palace lobby

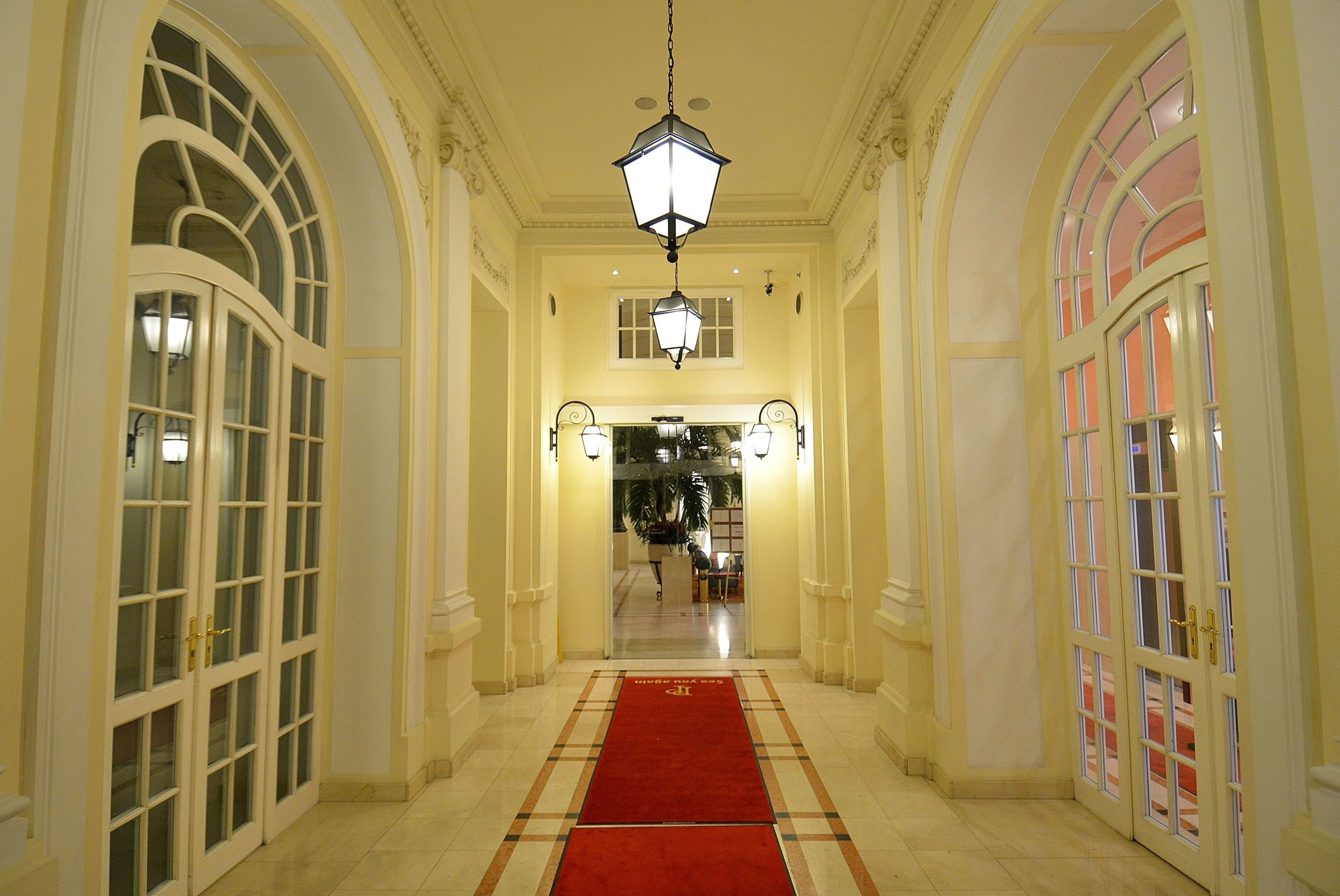
Hotel Polonia Palace entrance hallway

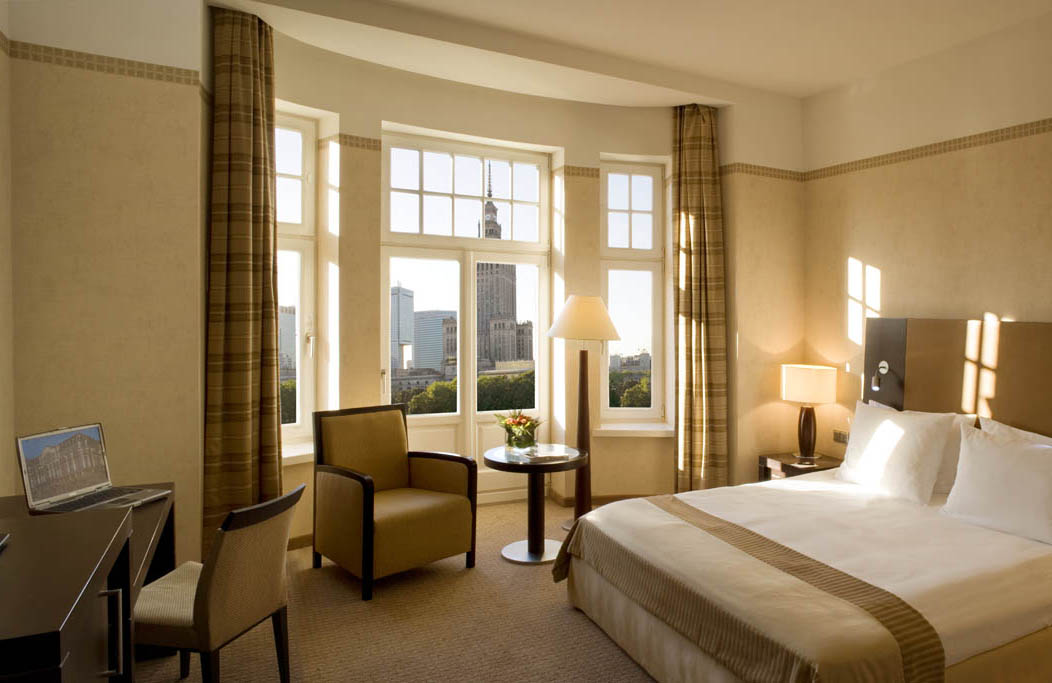
Deluxe Business Room

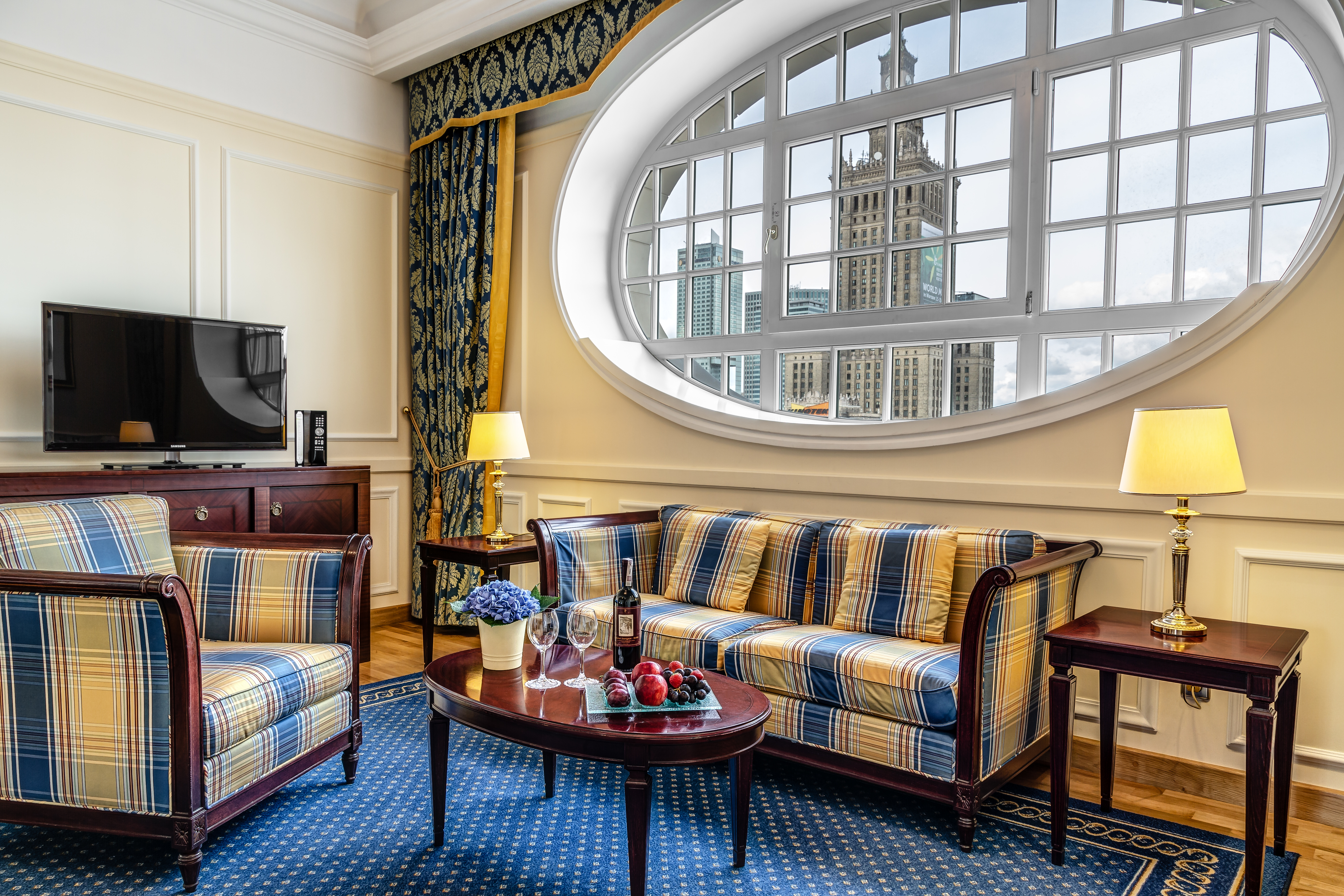
English Apartment

== See also ==
- Architecture of Warsaw
- Architecture of Poland
- Hotel Bristol, Warsaw
