= V Tower (Warsaw) =

Coordinates: 52°13′37″N 20°59′35″E

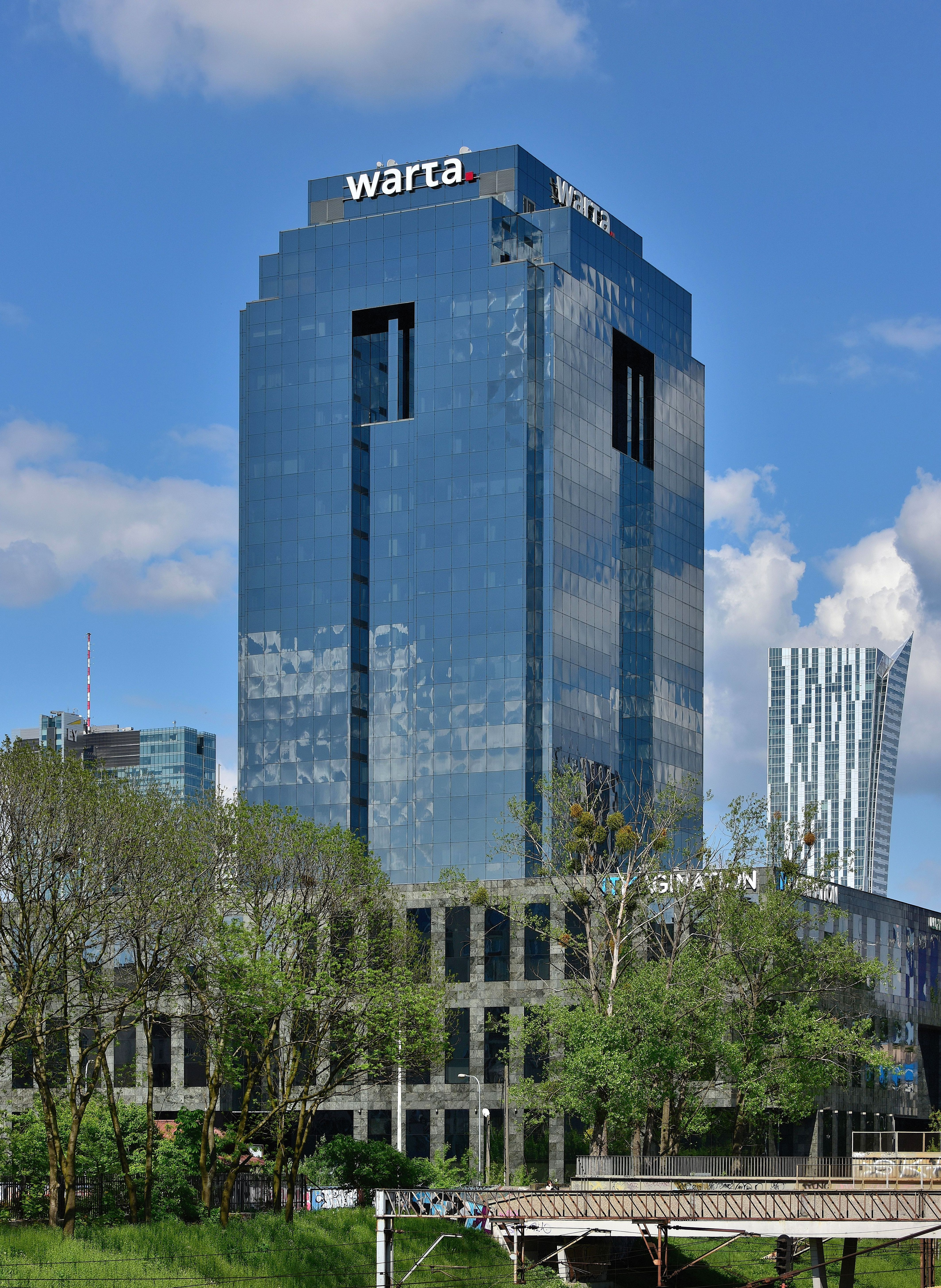
- Interactive map of the V Tower area

General information
- Location: Warsaw, Poland, ul. Chmielna 85/87
- Construction started: 1998
- Completed: 2000
- Owner: Cornerstone Investment Management

Height
- Height: 82m

Technical details
- Floor count: 22+3
- Floor area: 25,800m²

Design and construction
- Architects: Jerzy Czyż, Leszek Kazimierz Klajnert

Website
- wartatower.pl

V Tower (formarly Warta Tower) is an office building in Wola, Warsaw, Poland.

== Description ==
The building was designed by Jerzy Czyż and Leszek Kazimierz Klajnert. It a 22-storey building and is 82 meters tall. It was in construction between 1998 and 2000. It is owned by TUiR Warta insurance company, which is where the name of the building comes from. The building is the headquarters of the company.

The building is almost completely glazed in dark blue glass. Lower floors of the buildings have panels of polished dark gray granite.

The lobby of the building contains a sculpture of Barbara Falender. The area of the courtyard is 1200 m^{2}.

The beginning of a full revitalization process began in February 2024. The project is a comprehensive process, focused on preserving the building's original architectural character and materials. The initiative aims to highlight its Art Deco style while integrating modern technologies and forward-looking solutions to meet contemporary tenant needs.

== History ==
In March 2022 Globalworth, the owner of the building, offered space for 500 Ukrainian refugees under the SPACE FOR UKRAINE motto.
