= Joanna Mytkowska =

Polish curator and art critic (born 1970)

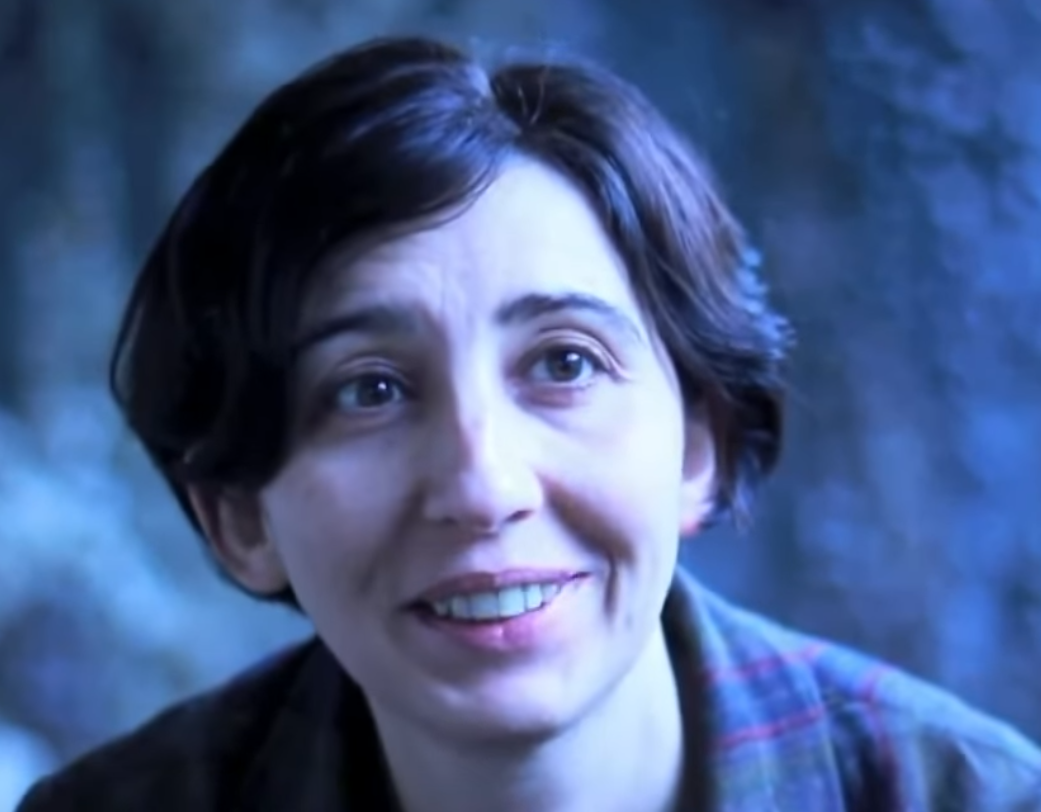
- Joanna Mytkowska in 2013
- Born: 1970 (age 55–56)
- Occupations: Curator; art critic; museum director

Joanna Mytkowska (1970) is a Polish curator and art critic. She has been the director of the Museum of Modern Art, Warsaw since 2007. She is the co-founder of the Foksal Gallery Foundation, which since 2001 has been operating independently from the Foksal Gallery.

== Early life and education ==
Mytkowska studied at the University of Warsaw from 1988 to 1994.

== Career ==
Mytkowska was the curator of the Artur Żmijewski exhibition at the Polish Pavilion during the 51st Venice Biennale (2005).

She organized the following exhibits for the Centre Georges Pompidou: Paweł Althamer (2006), The Magellanic Cloud (2007), The Anxious (2008) and Promises of the Past (2010).

Mytkowska was a member of the selection committee for Documenta 14, which took place in 2017. She was also a member of the jury that selected Kerstin Brätsch for the Edvard Munch Art Award in 2017.

== Recognition ==
In December 2018 Mytkowska was awarded the Igor Zabel Award for her curatorial and intellectual achievements at the Museum of Modern Art in Warsaw.
