= Take the Money and Run =

Take the Money and Run may refer to:

== Songs ==
- "Take the Money and Run" (Bunny Walters song), 1972
- "Take the Money and Run", by Crosby & Nash from Wind on the Water, 1975
- "Take the Money and Run" (Steve Miller Band song), 1976
- "Take the Money and Run", by Gerry Rafferty from Night Owl, 1979
- "Take the Money and Run", by Haustor from Bolero, 1985
- "Take the Money and Run", by Alan Parsons from Alan Parsons Live, 1994
- "Solo Impala (Take the Money and Run)", by the Fashion from The Fashion, 2007
- "Take the Money and Run", by Michael Nyman and David McAlmont from The Glare, 2009
- "Take the Money and Run" (O'G3NE song), 2016

== Movies and television ==
- Take the Money and Run (film), a 1969 comedy film by Woody Allen
- Take the Money and Run (TV series), a 2011 American reality game show
- "Take the Money and Run" (CSI: Crime Scene Investigation), an episode

== Other uses ==
- Take the Money and Run (artwork), 2021 work by Jens Haaning
