= Museum of Modern Art, Warsaw =

Modern art museum in Warsaw, Poland

Coordinates: 52°13′59″N 21°0′06″E

Museum of Modern Art in Warsaw
- Muzeum Sztuki Nowoczesnej w Warszawie

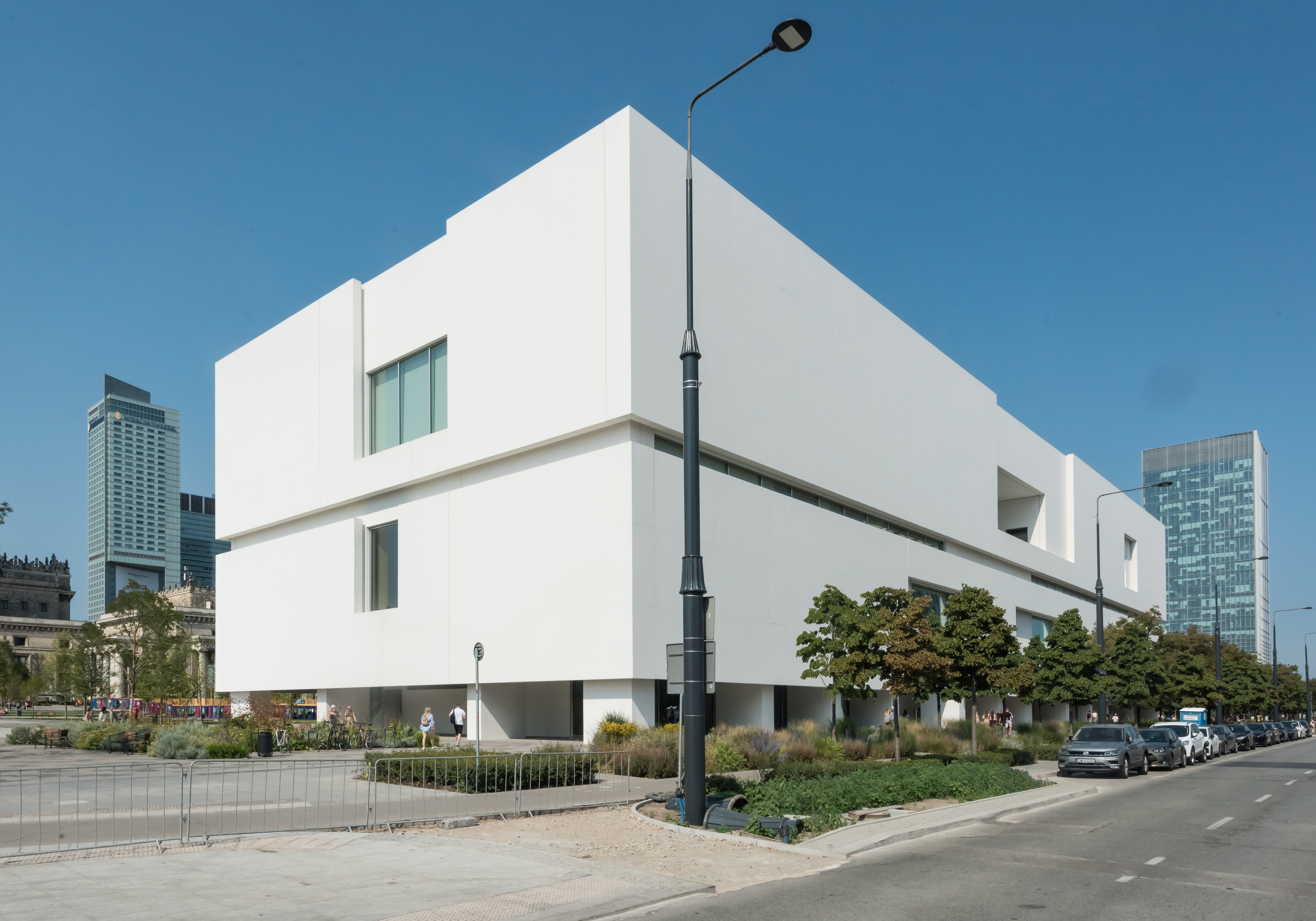
- Interactive fullscreen map
- Established: 2005
- Location: Śródmieście, Warsaw, Poland
- Director: Joanna Mytkowska
- Architect: Thomas Phifer
- Public transit access: Centrum; Świętokrzyska
- Website: www.artmuseum.pl/en

The Museum of Modern Art in Warsaw (Polish: Muzeum Sztuki Nowoczesnej w Warszawie, MSN), also known as MSN Warsaw, is a modern and contemporary art museum in Warsaw, Poland. The museum was founded in 2005 and the director of the museum since June 6, 2007 has been Joanna Mytkowska. MSN was a cultural institution co-run by the Ministry of Culture and National Heritage and the city of Warsaw, from 2023 it is a local government cultural institution run by the city of Warsaw.

In 2024, the museum opened in its Thomas Phifer-designed venue at Marszałkowska Street. The permanent collection is expected to be presented by February 2025. Before its current location, the museum was located at temporary premises: Museum at Pańska (office spaces at ul. Pańska 3) and the Museum over Vistula pavilion (exhibition space at Wybrzeże Kościuszkowskie 22), which was designed by A. Krischanitz and decorated by Sławomir Pawszak.

== Thomas Phifer Building ==
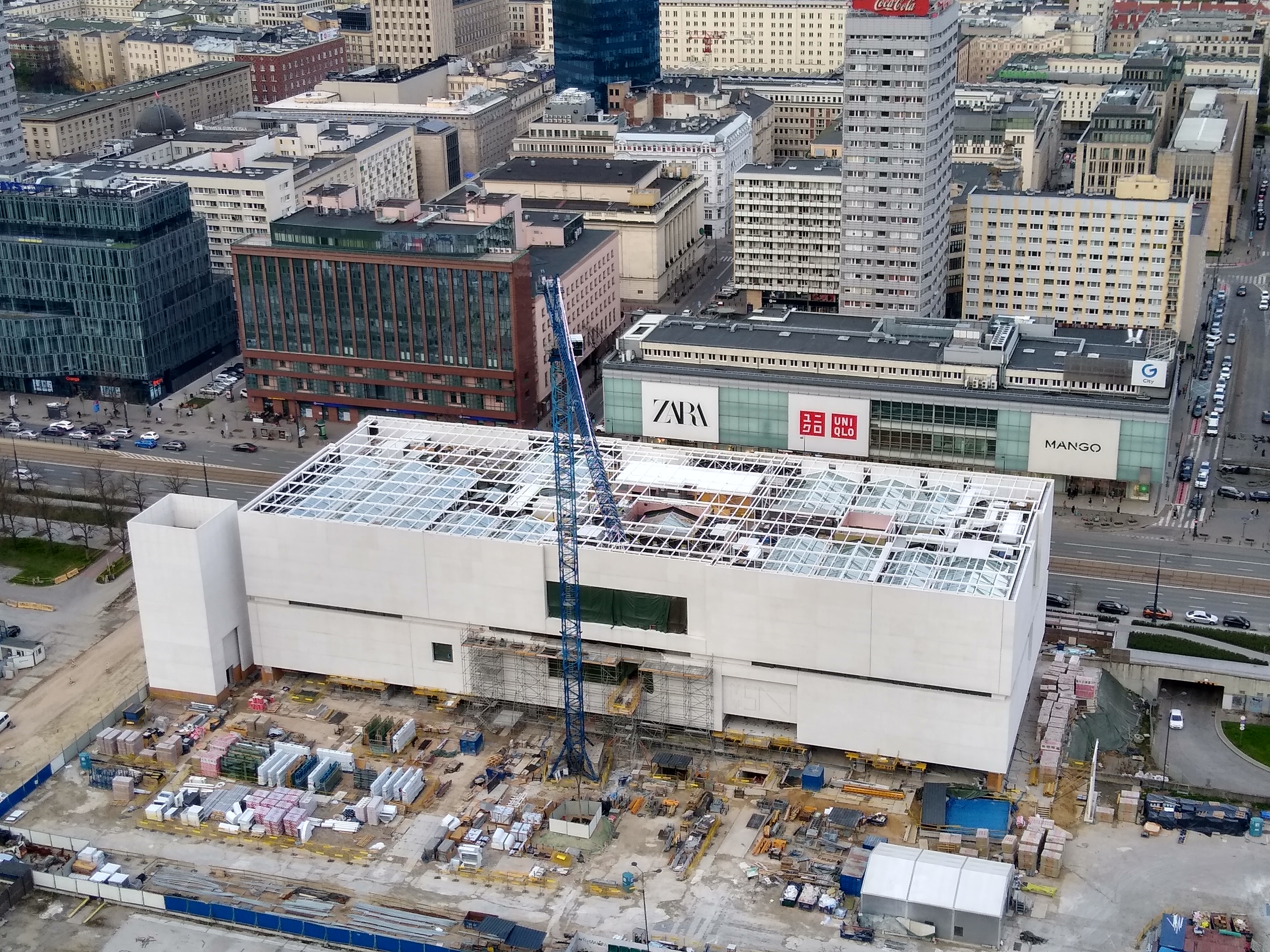
MSN construction in 2023, as seen from the Palace of Culture and Science

In 2006, the first international architectural competition for the design of the museum was announced. The competition was won in February 2007 by architect C. Kerez. It was chosen from over 100 designs. Eventually however, in May 2012, the City terminated the contract with Christian Kerez. At the same time it was decided that for the next three years the temporary location for the museum would be in Pańska Street, off the nearby main thoroughfare Emilii Plater.

The new custom-built museum was designed by the New York City-based architecture studio Thomas Phifer and Partners, chosen in the two-stage tender proceeding in 2013–14. Located on the northern side of Plac Defilad (city center), it was opened on 25 October 2024.

In an interview with ARTnews on September 29 2025, the museum director Joanna Mytkowska highlighted that the new building is already an iconic architectural landmark in the centre of Warsaw, reflecting multiple aspects of Polish history including war time destruction, communism era and the post communism transformation period. Mytkowaska said the museum's collection reflect this transformation from local interpretations of art to international audiences.

== Collection and program ==
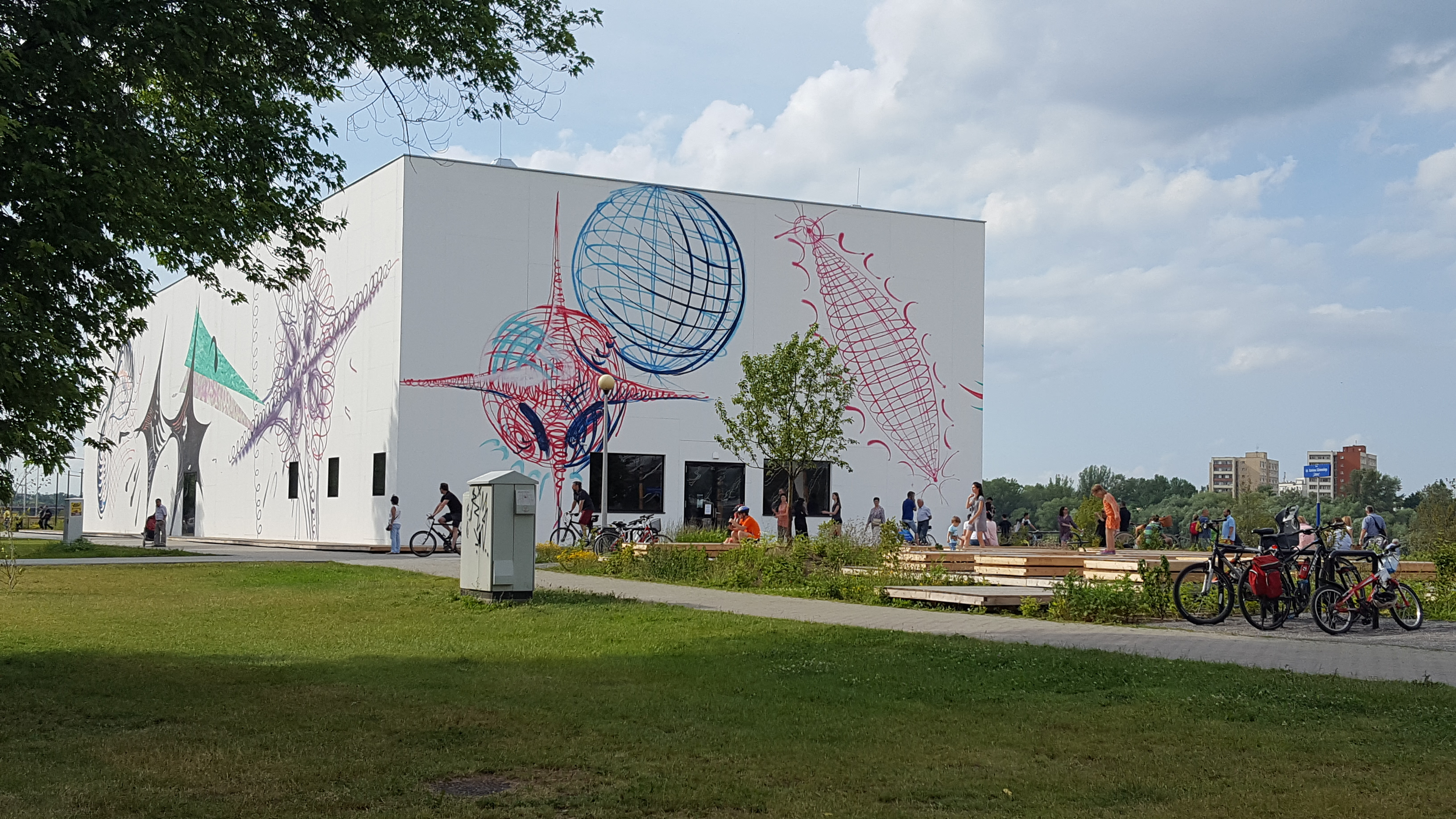
Museum on the Vistula

The museum presents the achievements and changes in Polish art of the twentieth and twenty-first century in an international context, creates an art collection, presents significant phenomena in the field of visual arts, film, theater and music, as well as supports exceptionally talented artists.

The museum has in its collection works by Mirosław Bałka, Yael Bartana, Wojciech Bąkowski, Rafał Bujnowski, Oskar Dawicki, Ion Grigorescu, Aneta Grzeszykowska, KwieKulik, Deimantas Narkevičius, Jadwiga Sawicka, Krzysztof Wodiczko, Andrzej Wróblewski, Artur Żmijewski, Magdalena Abakanowicz, Paweł Althamer, Katarzyna Kozyra, Jarosław Modzelewski, Katarina Šeda, Wilhelm Sasnal, Marek Sobczyk, Monika Sosnowska, Alina Szapocznikow, Piotr Uklański, archives of Eustachy Kossakowski, among others.

=== Selected temporary exhibitions ===
- Tiger in the Garden – The Art of Maria Prymaczenko (2024)
- Cruel Tales. Aleksandra Waliszewska and the Symbolism of the East and the North – at the Lithuanian National Museum of Art (2022)
- Things Have Turned – an exhibition on the 50th anniversary of the monthly Literatura na Świecie (2021)
- Henryk Streng/Marek Włodarski and Jewish-Polish Modernism (2021)
- MIRIAM CAHN: I, THE HUMAN BEING (2019)
- Daniel Rycharski. Fears (2019)
- Edi Hila. Painter of Transformation (2018)
- Danwen Xing, Diary. Avant-Garde in China 1993–2003 (2018)
- Zofia Rydet. Record, 1978–1990 (2015)
- Július Koller “?” (2015)
- Andrzej Wróblewski: Recto / Verso 1948–1949, 1956–1957 (2015)
- Maria Bartuszová. Transitional forms (2014)
- TypoPolo, exhibition about TypoPolo (2014)
- Wall and Tower, show of works by Israeli artist Yael Bartana (2009)
- Domestication, exhibition of works by Palestinian artist Ahlam Shibli (2009)
- 9 Rays of Light in the Sky, show of works by Henryk Stażewski (2008)
- Żelimir Żilnik at the Museum of Modern Art in Warsaw (2008)
- Sharon Hayes – In the Near Future (2008)

=== Gallery ===
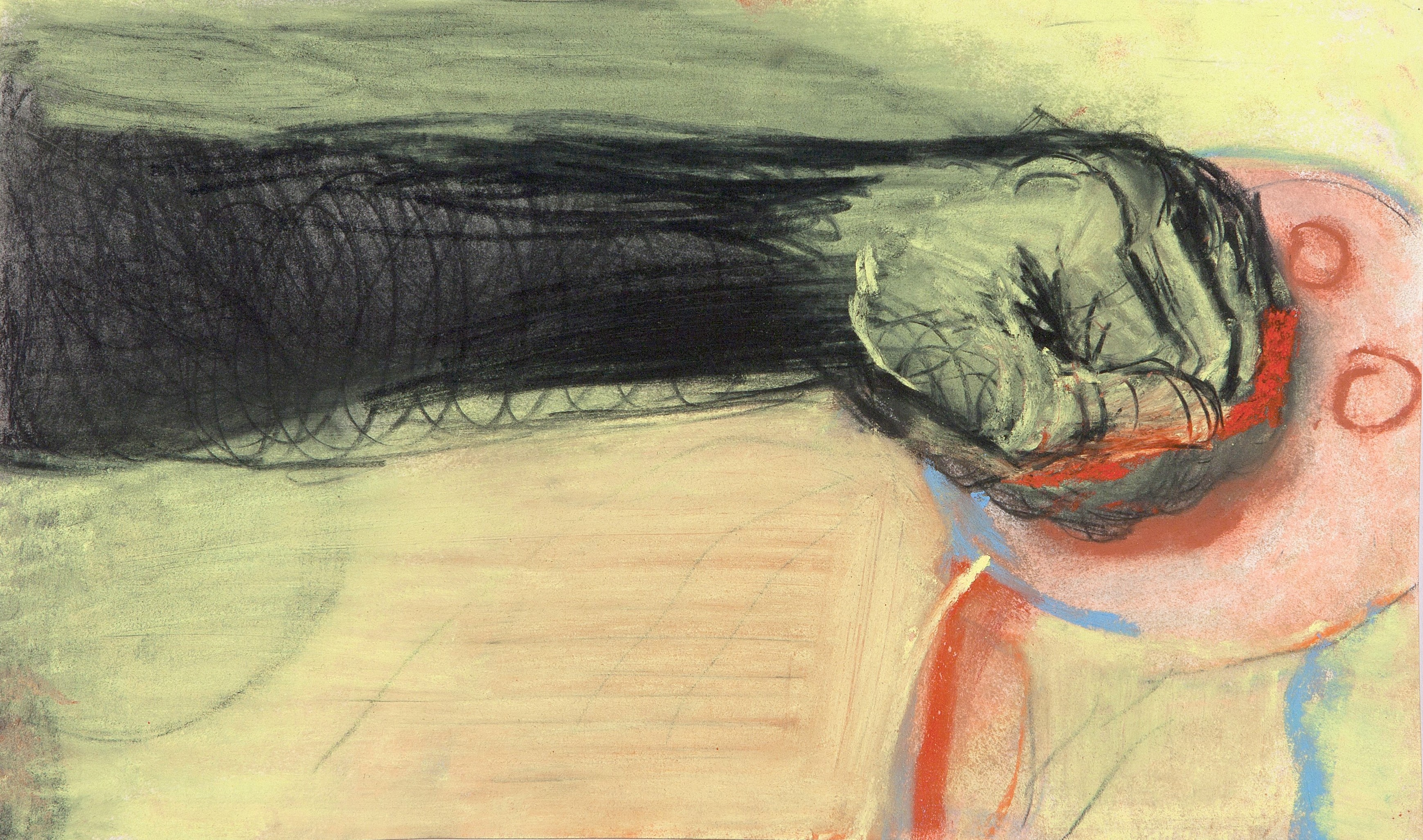
Miriam Cahn, o.T. 10.05.2012 (2012)

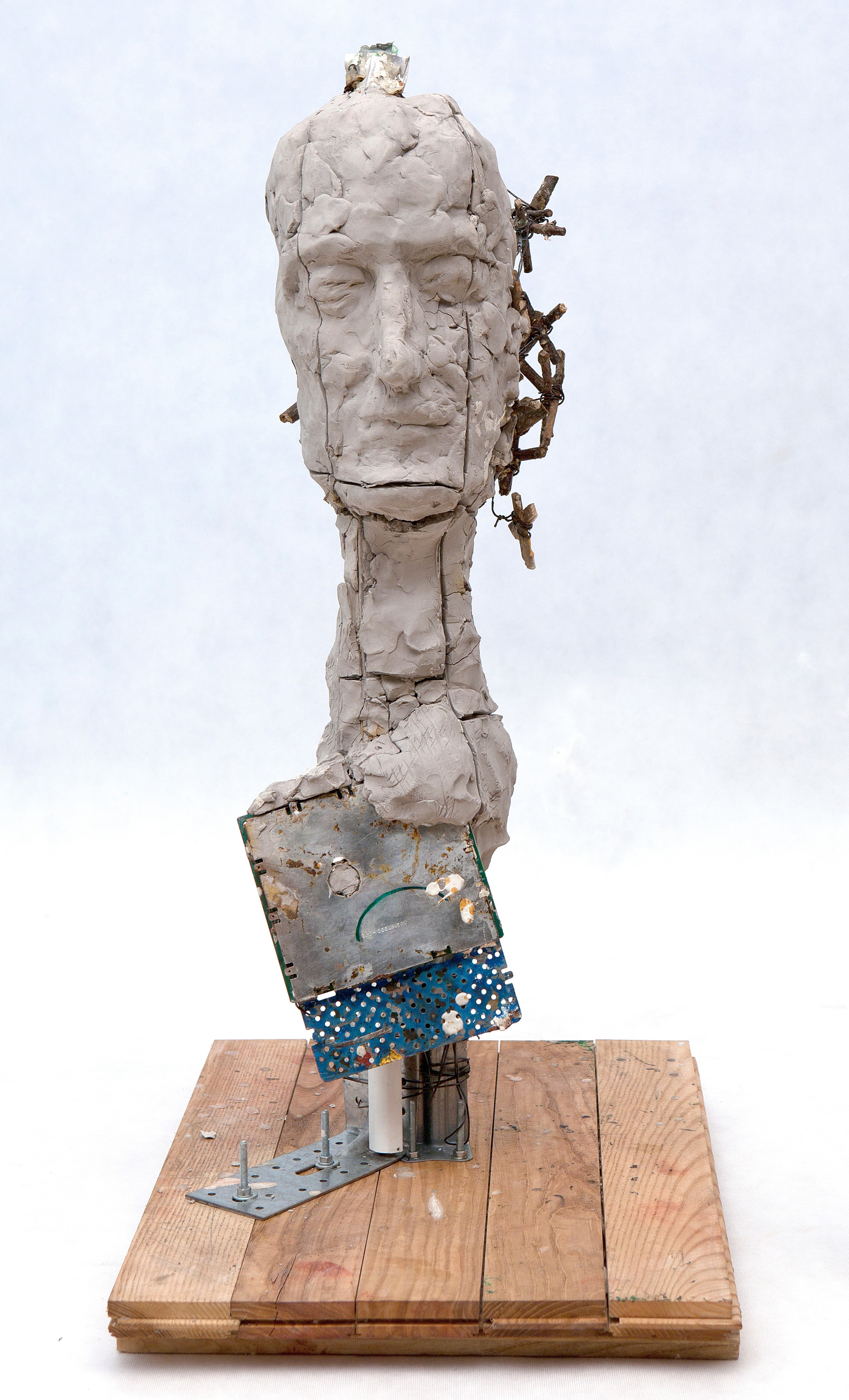
Artur Żmijewski, Paweł Althamer, Visit of Professor Zemła (2013)

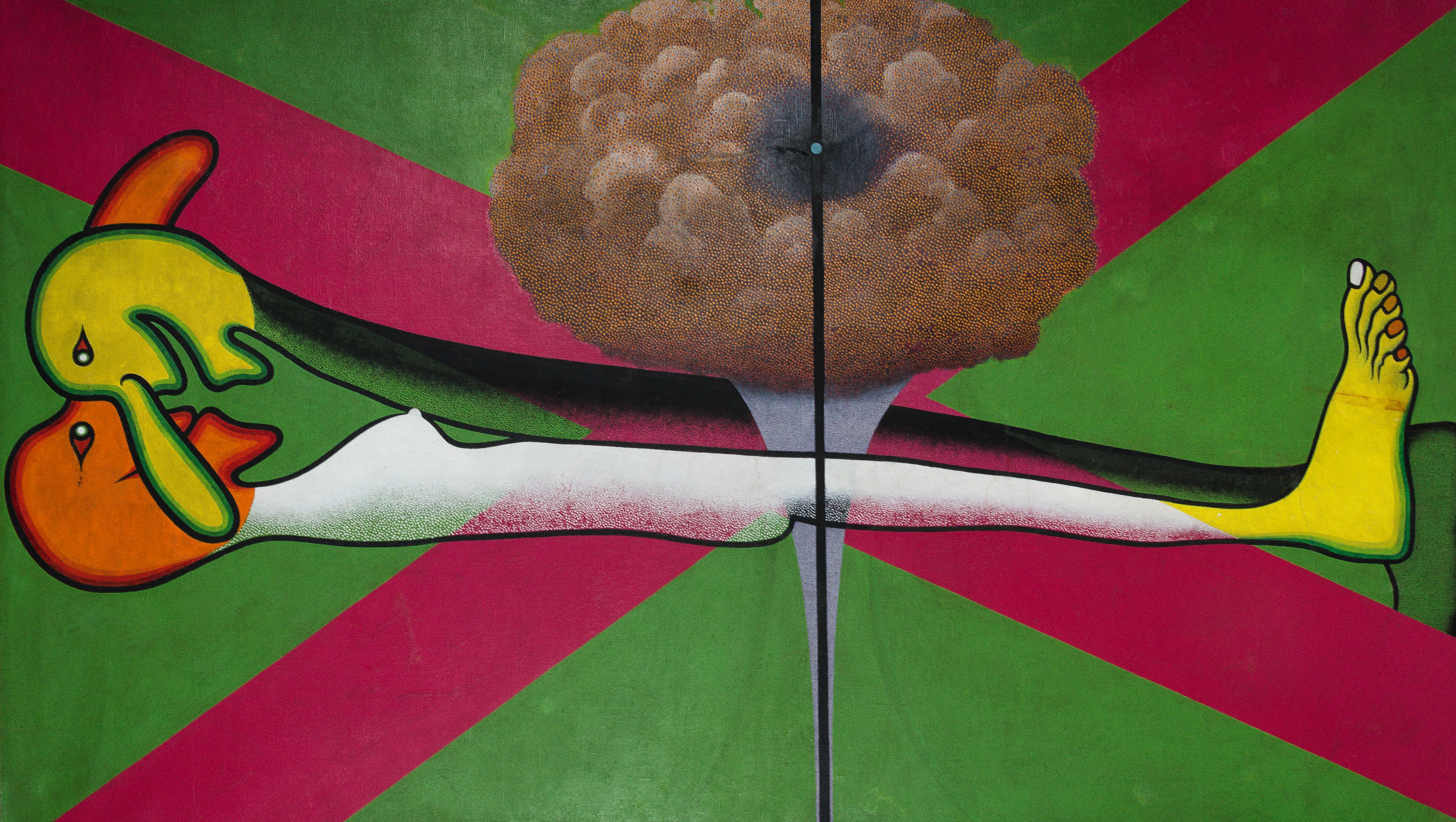
Edward Narkiewicz, Untitled (1969)

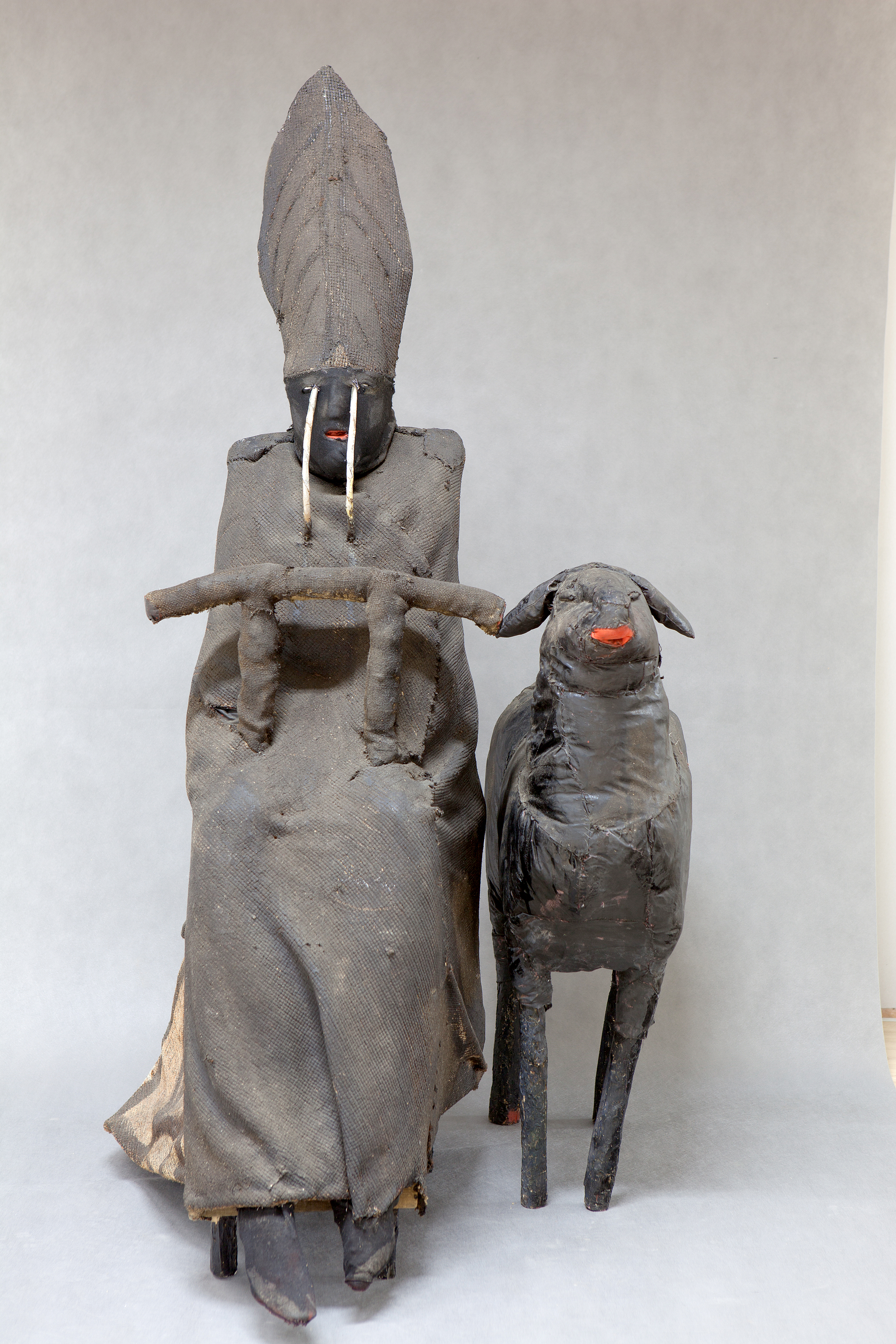
Mirosław Bałka, Black Pope and Black Sheep (1987)

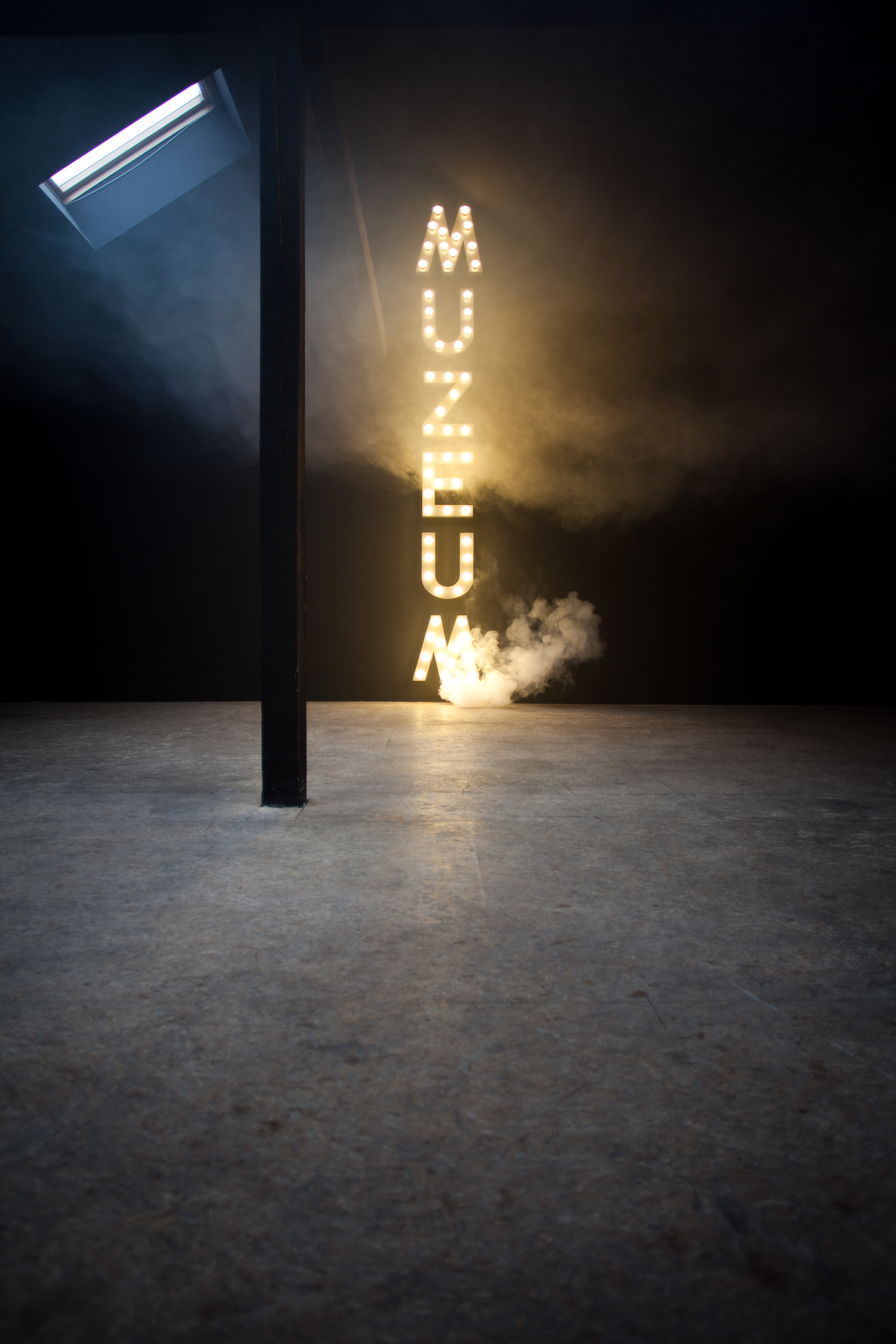
Paulina Ołowska, Museum (2010)

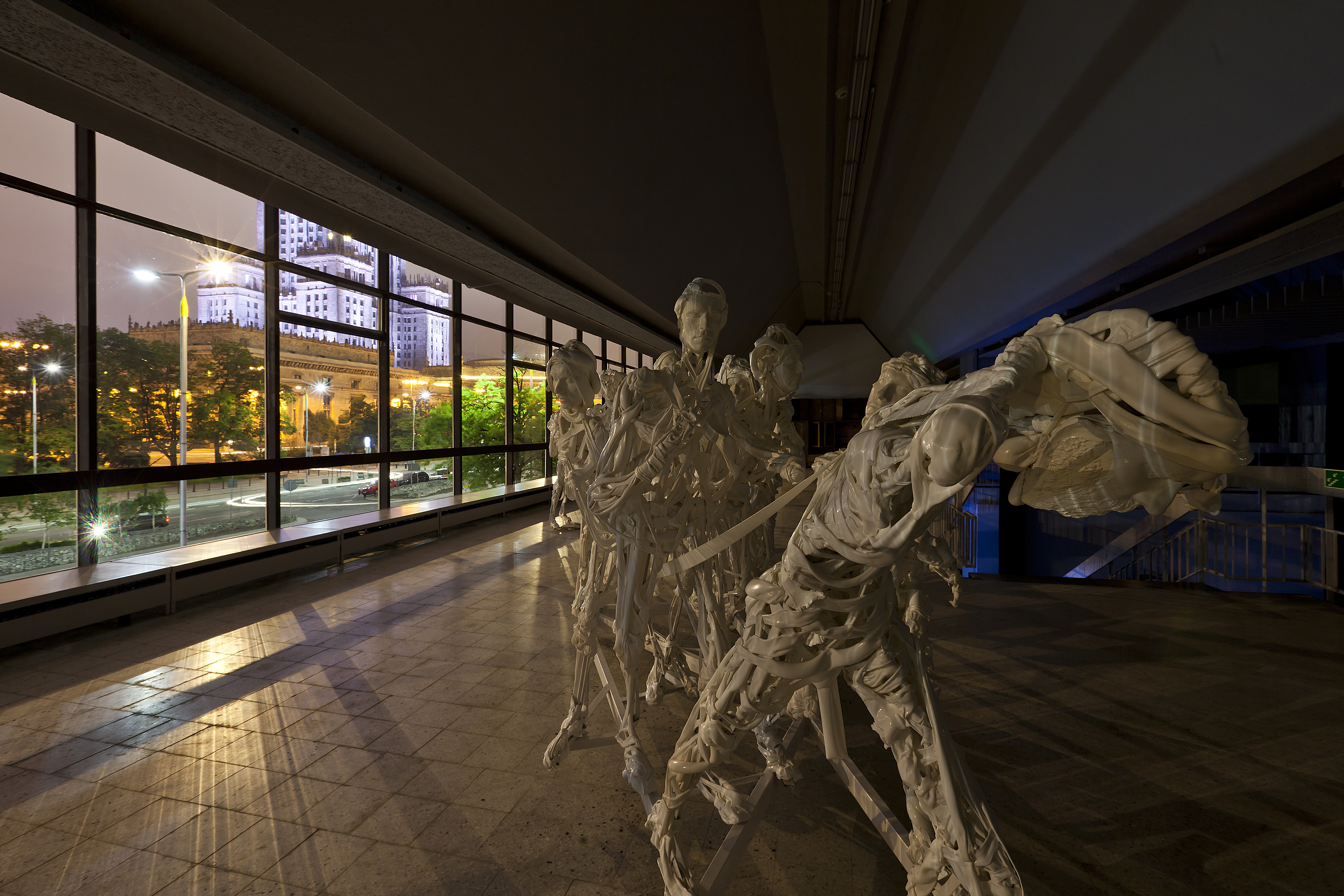
Paweł Althamer, Burlaks (2012)

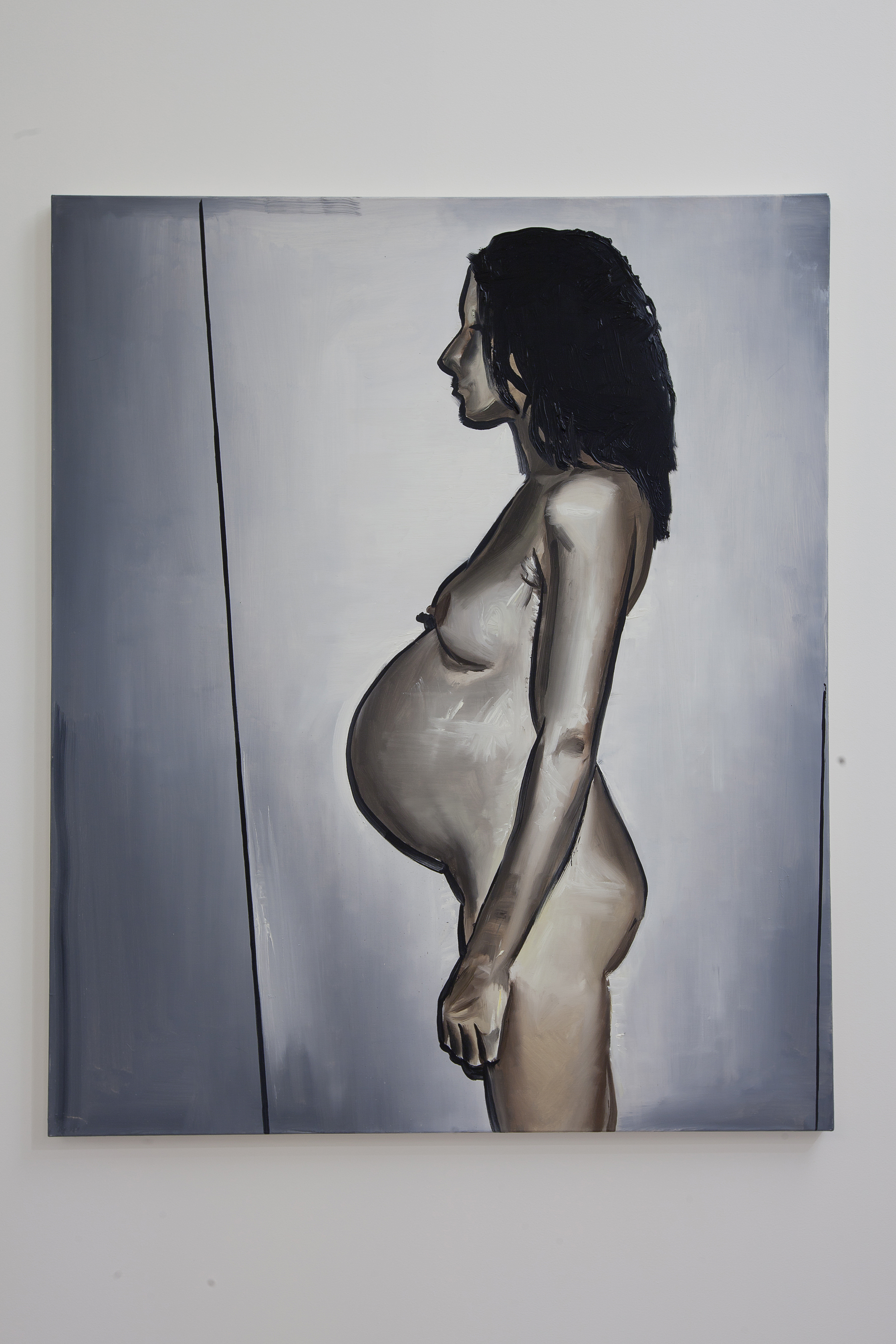
Wilhelm Sasnal, Anka (2010)

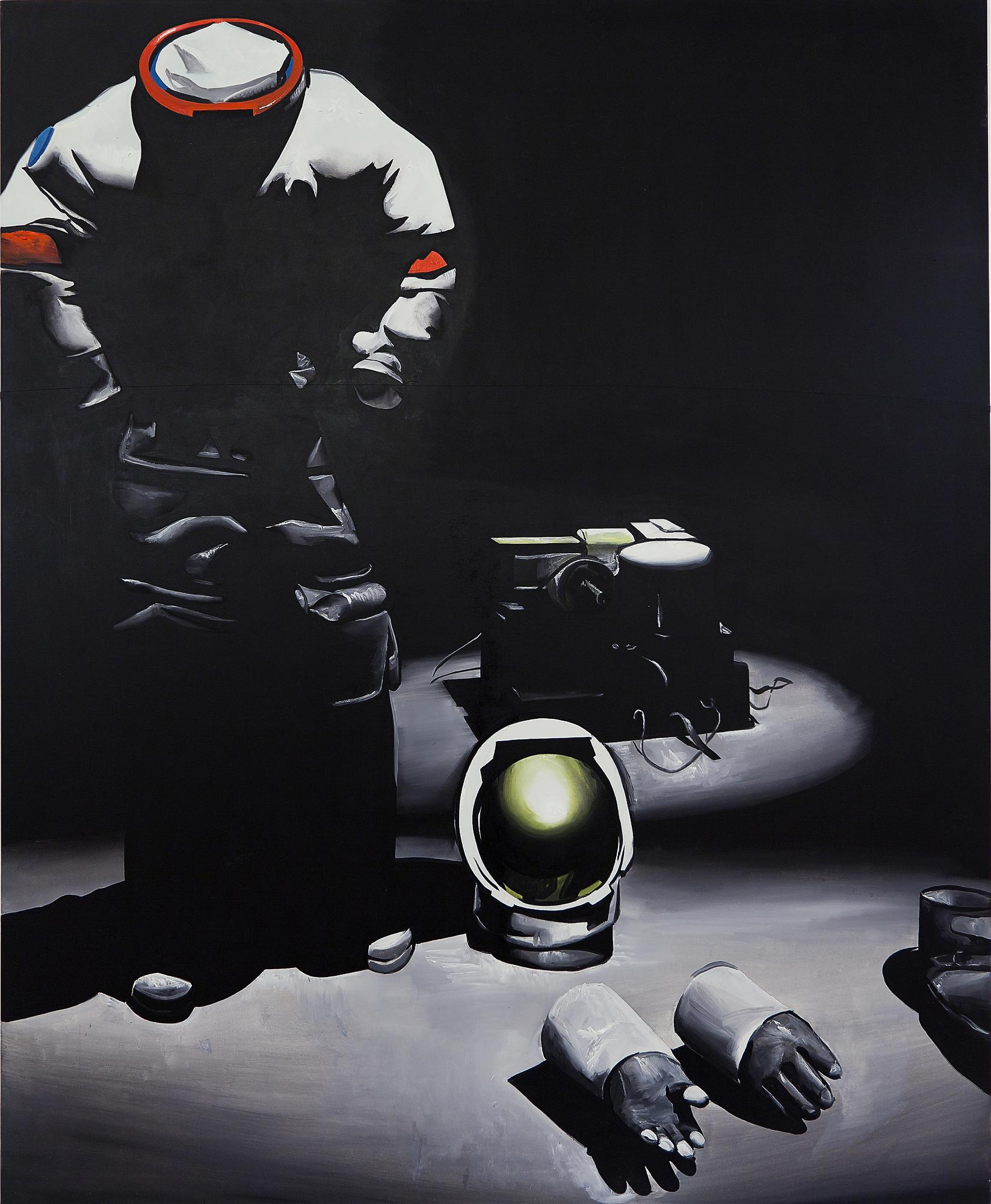
Wilhelm Sasnal, Untitled (Astronaut) (2011)

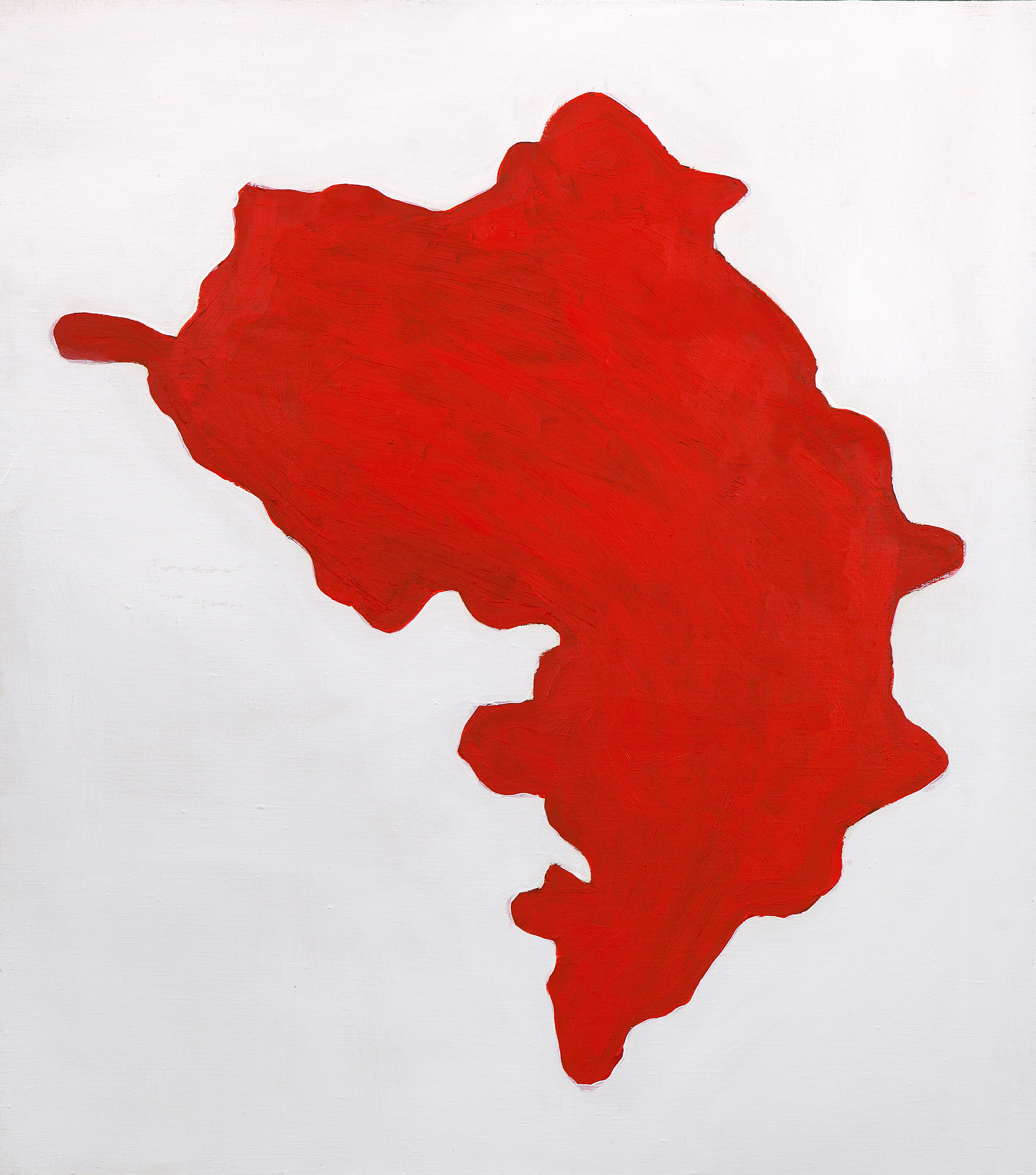
David Ter-Oganjan, Nagorno-Karabakh (2011)

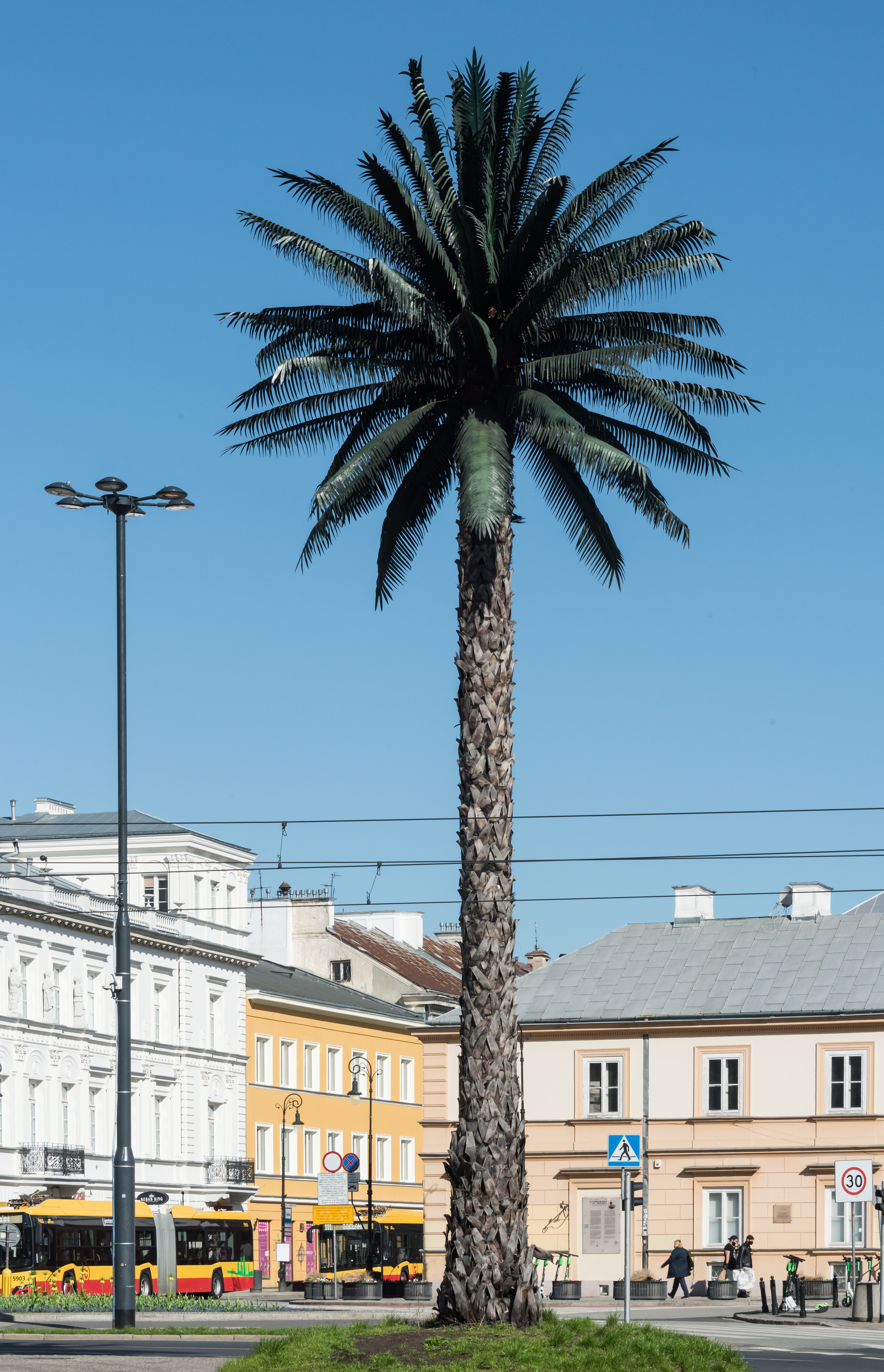
Joanna Rajkowska, Greetings from Jerusalem Avenue (2002, Jerusalem Avenue, Warsaw)

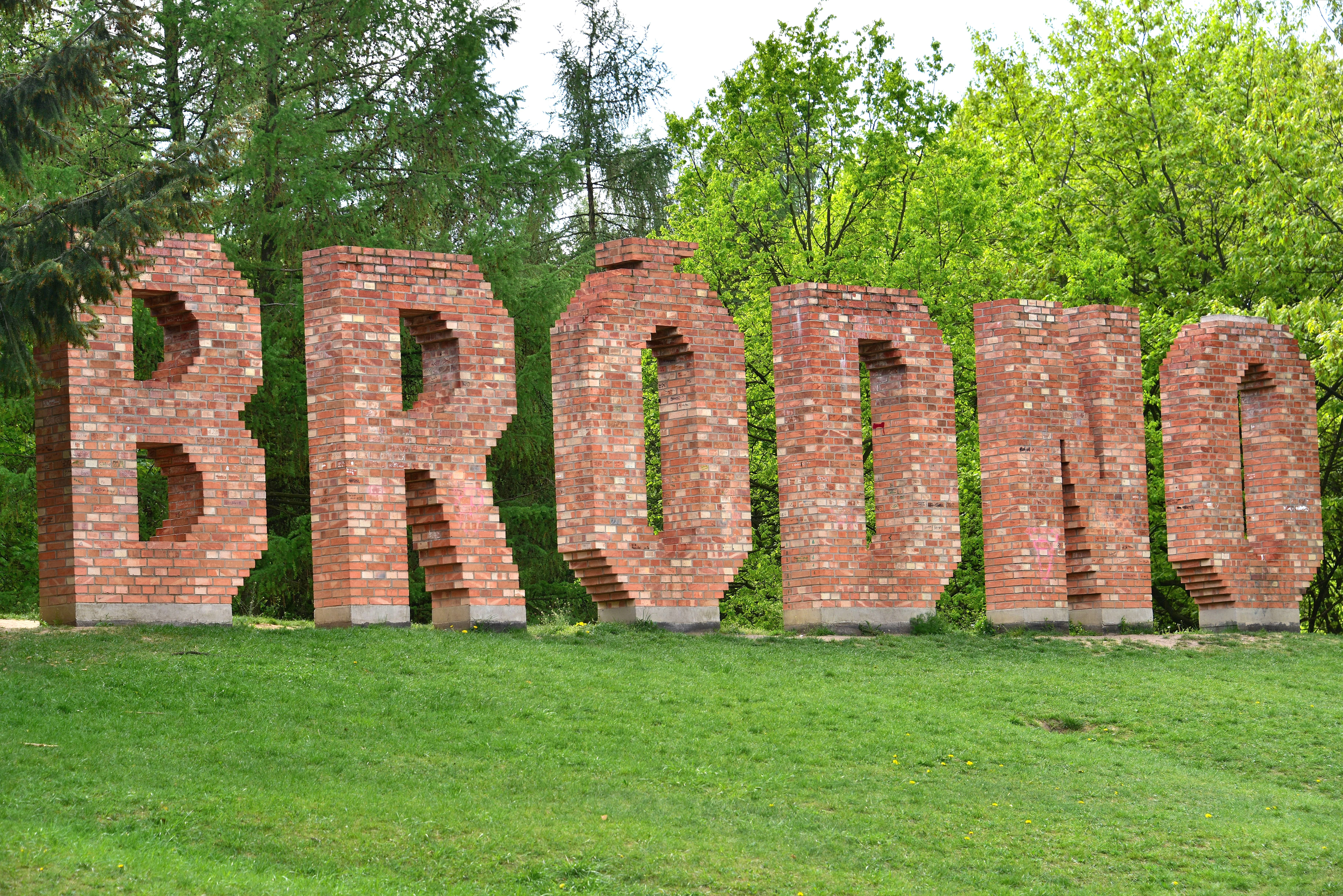
Jens Haaning, Bródno (2012, Bródno Park)

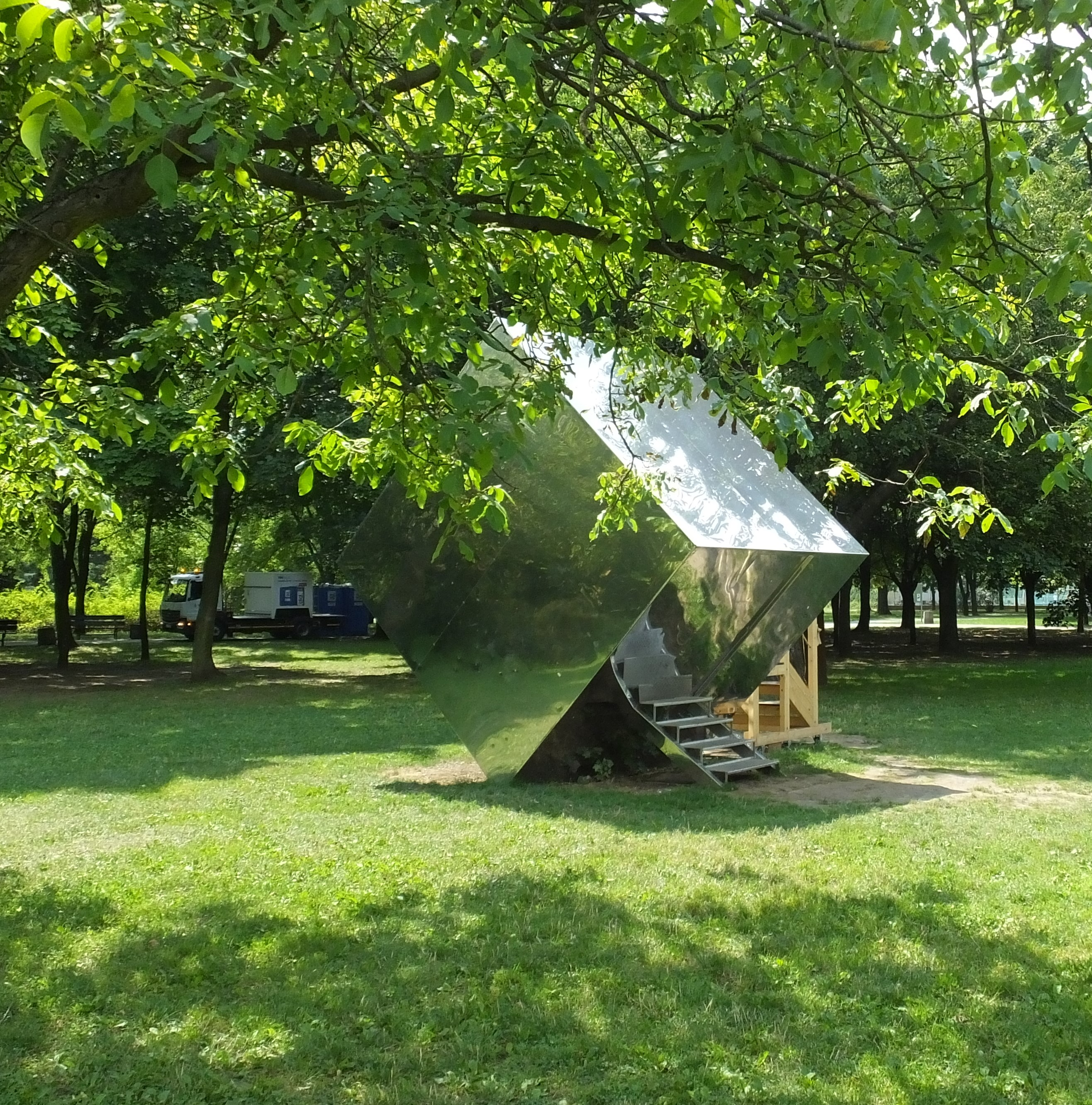
Paweł Althamer and Rirkrit Tiravanija, Overturned Tea House With Coffee Machine (2005, Bródno Park)

== See also ==
- Zachęta National Gallery of Art
- Ujazdów Castle
- Bródno Park
