= Jason Loebs =

Jason Loebs (born in 1981) is an American conceptual artist based in New York. He is known for his exploration of phenomena such as dispersion, decay, and entropy in relation to the information society. His work delves into the invisible forces and digital traces that shape contemporaneity, often using technology to reveal unseen aspects of everyday objects and environments.

== Early life and education ==
Jason Loebs attended the Whitney Independent Study Program in 2011, received his MFA from the Art Institute of Chicago in 2007, and a certificate from the Pennsylvania Academy of the Fine Arts in 2004.

== Exhibitions ==
Jason Loebs works have been exhibited in solo and group exhibitions MMK, Museum für Moderne Kunst, Frankfurt am Main, Fridericianum, Kassel; Museum of Modern Art Warsaw; Kunstverein Nürnberg; Ludlow 38 of the Goethe-Institut New York, Maxwell Graham Galley, New York; Éclair, Berlin; Galerie Max Mayer, Düsseldorf; Kunsthalle Freiburg, Fribourg.
