= Bródno Park =

Urban park in Warsaw, Poland

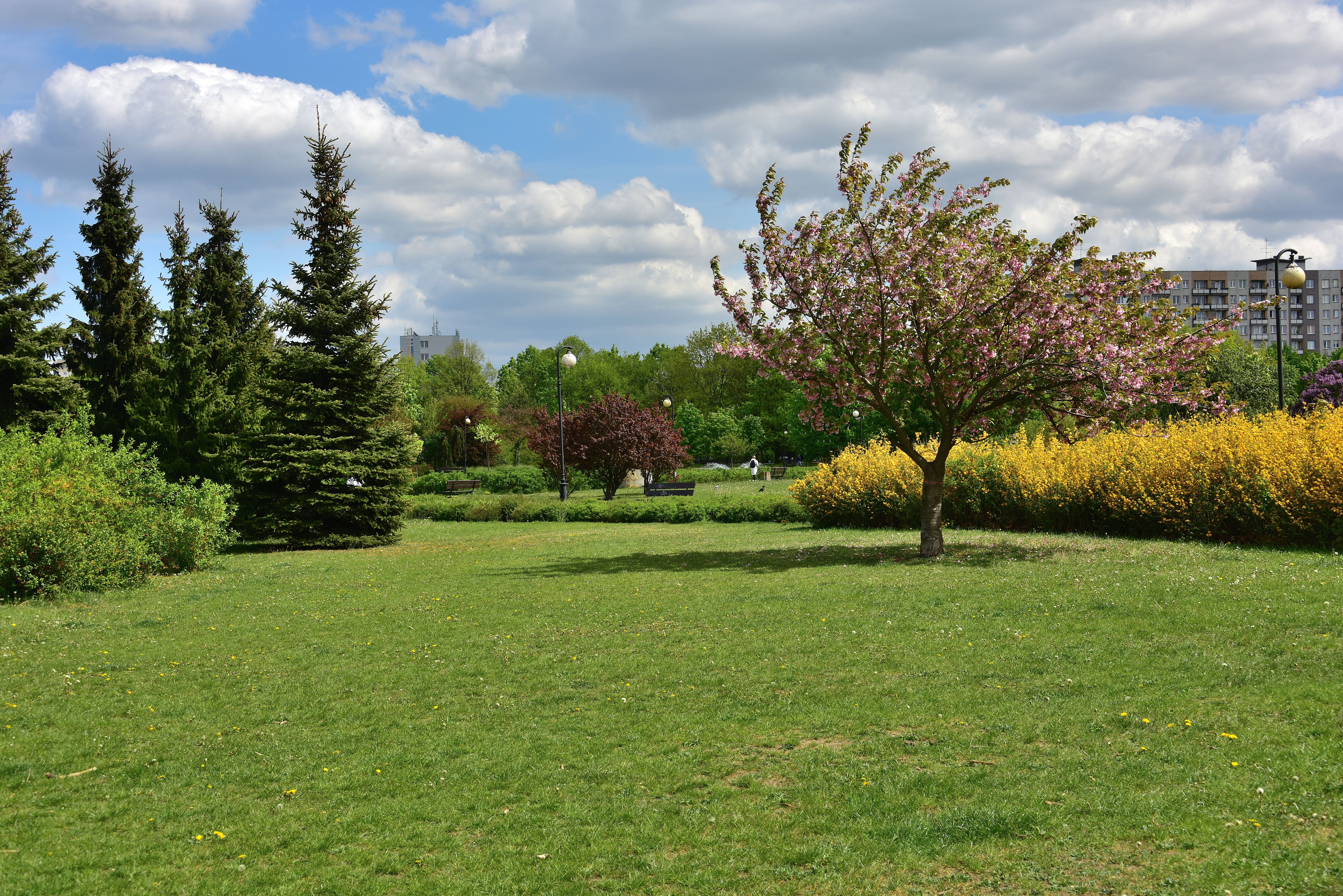
- The Bródno Park in 2019.
- Interactive map of Bródno Park
- Type: Urban park
- Location: Warsaw, Poland
- Coordinates: 52°17′26″N 21°02′11″E
- Area: 25.4 hectares (63 acres)
- Created: 1978
- Designer: Stefania Traczyńska

The Bródno Park (Polish: [ˈbrud.nɔ]; Polish: Park Bródnowski) is an urban park in the city of Warsaw in Masovian Voivodeship, Poland, within the neighbourhood of Bródno in the Targówek district. It is placed between Kondratowicza, Chodecka, Wyszogrodzka, and Łabiszyńska Streets. The park was opened in 1978.

== History ==
The park was designed by Stefania Traczyńska, and developed between 1976 and 1978.

In 2009, the Bródno Sculpture Park (Polish: Park Rzeźby na Bródnie), an outdoors arts exhibition designed by artist Paweł Althamer, was opened within the park. The arts collection displayed there is managed by the Museum of Modern Art in Warsaw.

== Characteristics ==
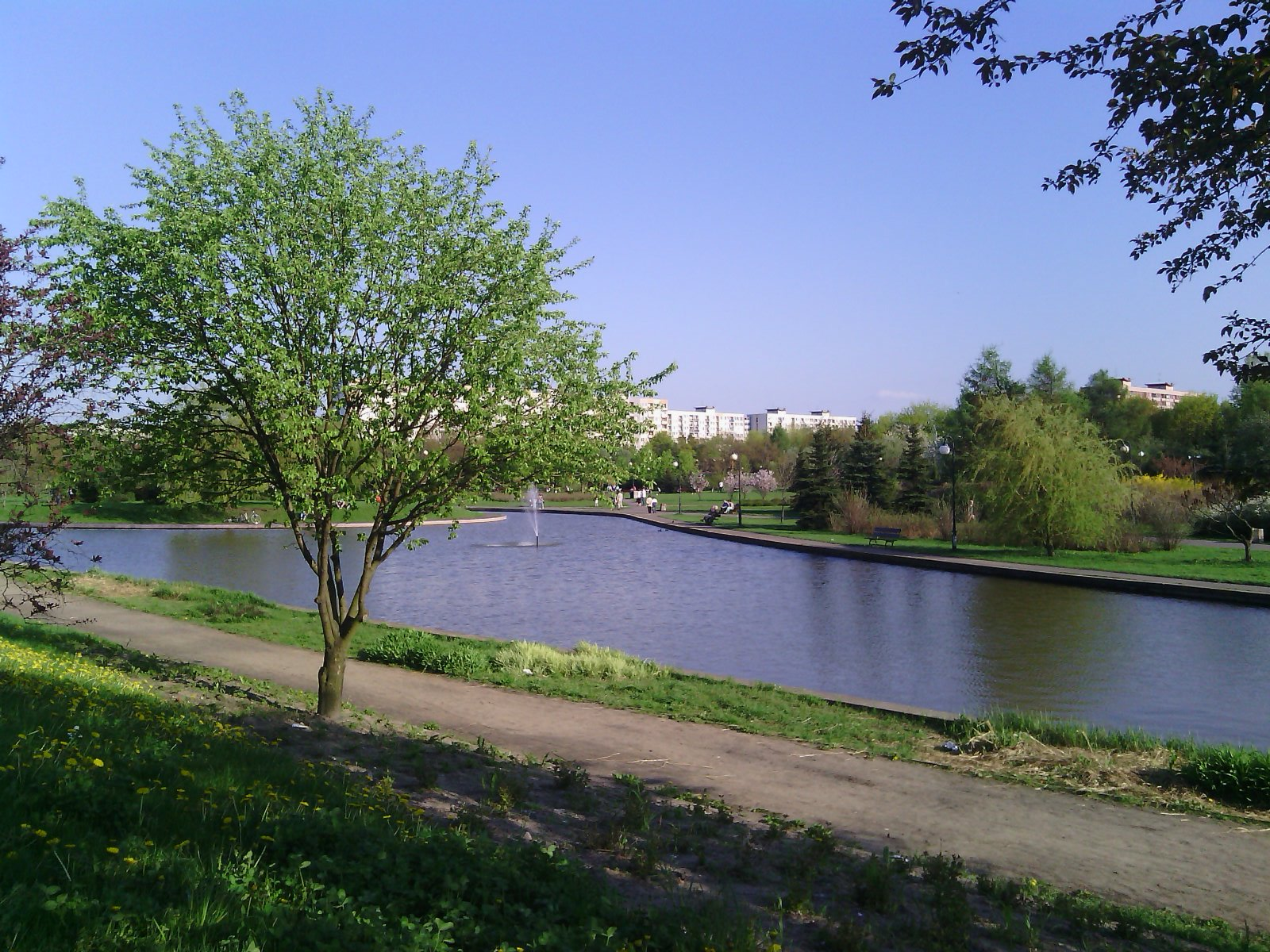
One of the ponds in the Bródno Park, in 2013.

The park is placed between Kondratowicza, Chodecka, Wyszogrodzka, and Łabiszyńska Streets. It has a total area of 25.4 ha. It forms a recreational area for local inhabitants, and includes courts for basketball, volleyball, and association football.

The park also includes several small ponds with their total area measuring 0.7 ha.

In the park functions the Bródno Sculpture Park (Polish: Park Rzeźby na Bródnie), an outdoors arts exhibition designed by artist Paweł Althamer. The arts collection displayed there is managed by the Museum of Modern Art.
