= Bródno =

Neighborhood in Warsaw, Poland

Coordinates: 52°17′N 21°02′E

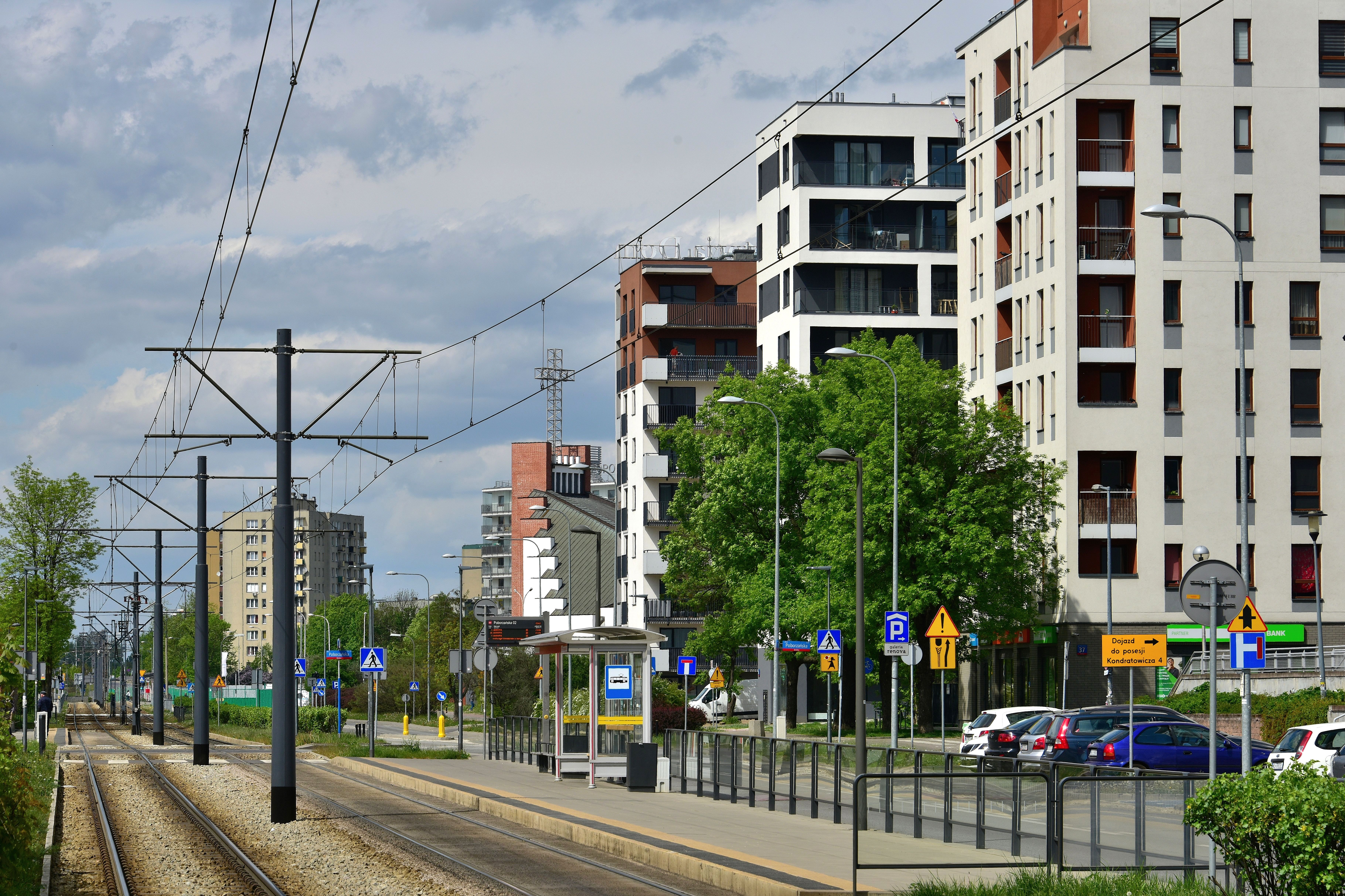
Rembielińska Street, Bródno

Bródno is a neighborhood in the Warsaw borough of Targówek, located on the eastern side of the Vistula river.

Bródno is inhabited by approximately 100,000 people. Among the most notable landmarks are Bródno Park and the Bródno cemetery, the largest cemetery in Warsaw and one of the largest cemeteries in Europe. In the beginning of the 10th century the castle has been built. It was quite close to the forest and near Bródno Park. In the area there was a small river named Brodnia. In the 14th century a grange has also arisen in the area. This neighborhood is divided into two parts - Bródno and Bródno-Podgrodzie. The apartments are located between the railways and the bridge. Bródno borders Praga and Białołęka.

== History ==
A settlement in the area of Bródno was established in the 9th century. Soon afterwards, a substantial fortified stronghold was built there, but it was burned down in the mid-11th century and never rebuilt. The settlement itself, which had a craft and trading character, continued to exist. It formed part of the domain of the dukes of Masovia and, after Masovia was incorporated into the Crown, became part of the royal estates.

The name Bródno was first recorded in 1414–1425. The city derives its name from the Brodnia River, which flows nearby. During the Swedish Deluge, in 1656, the settlement was completely destroyed, most likely during the battle fought there on 28–30 July 1656 between Polish forces and the Swedish and Brandenburg armies.

In 1867–1868, the Bródno commune was established by imperial decree. Following the construction of the Vistula Railway, the area began to undergo rapid industrial development.

In 1570, there existed eleven unrented włókas and one lan of one wójt. In the following century, a twelve-lan folwark was established. In the mid 17th century, Poland-Lithuania was invaded by the Swedes in what became the deluge; the accompanying 1656 Battle of Warsaw ended the town's rapid development. Jewish settlers began burying their dead in Brodno in 1743, paving the way for the establishment of the Bródno Jewish Cemetery. The city's development largely restarted when the Warszawa Praga railway station and accompanying Vistula Railway were opened in 1875. By 1880, the area had 360 houses and 960 inhabitants. A major flood in 1917 caused large parts of the city to be underwater. In 1925, residents funded the construction of a monument commemorating the 1920 defense of Warsaw during the Polish–Soviet War.

The area was largely destroyed in 1939 during the German invasion of Warsaw. Under the Communists, there were plans to construct a housing project and a park, as well as a large shopping and cultural center; only a smaller version of the park was built. The area largely took its current form in the 1970s. In 2022, the Bródno metro station opened as the northwesternmost station of the Warsaw Metro.

== Bibliography ==
- Stolarski, Rafał E., ed. (2010). Bródno i okolice w pamiętnikach mieszkańców. Vol. 2 (2nd, corrected and expanded ed.). Warsaw: Urząd Dzielnicy Targówek m.st. Warszawy. p. 272. ISBN 978-83-60508-53-4.
