= Miriam Cahn =

Swiss painter

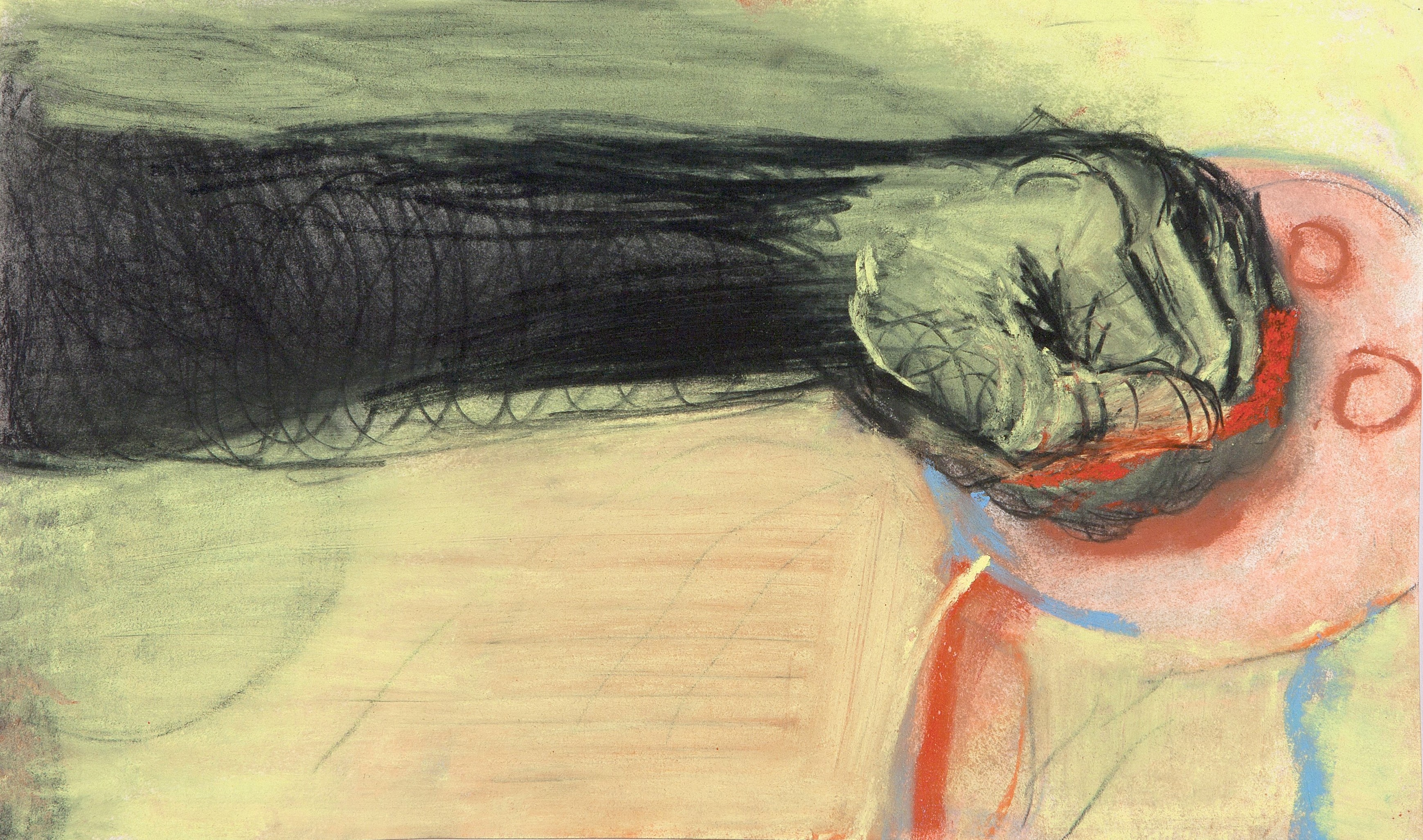
Miriam Cahn, untitled 10 May 2012, 2012, pastel and charcoal on paper, 39 x 23 cm. Museum of Modern Art in Warsaw Collection

Miriam Cahn (born 21 July 1949) is a Swiss painter.

== Biography ==
Cahn was born on 21 July 1949 in Basel, Switzerland. She studied at Schule für Gestaltung Basel in Basel from 1968 to 1973, where she became involved with feminist and anti-nuclear movements. Cahn is Jewish.

== Work ==
Cahn's paintings and drawings incorporate feminism and child endangerment themes, female rituals; often featuring "violent and shocking representations of sexual organs". They are often created using unorthodox methods. Cahn's first exhibition was Being a Women in My Public Role in 1979. Cahn's first exhibition in the United States was at the Elizabeth Dee Gallery, New York City, in 2011. Cahn's work has described as having Neo-Expressionist influences.

== Reception and awards ==
Jörg Scheller describes Cahn as a "feminist who likes to fight." Her work has been the source of some controversy, including in 2023, when several French far-right associations petitioned to have Cahn's fuck abstraction! removed from the "My Serial Thought" show at the Palais de Tokyo, claiming the painting depicted "pedo-pornographic" material. France's State Council rejected the appeal and allowed the painting, which abstractly depicted the Bucha massacre by Russian troops.

In 1998, Cahn won the Käthe Kollwitz Prize awarded by the Academy of Arts, Berlin.

In 2024, Cahn received the Goslarer Kaiserring.

== Collections ==
Cahn's works can be found in numerous art collections around the world, among others at MoMA in New York, at the Tate Modern in London, at the Reina Sofía Museum in Madrid, as well as at the Museum of Modern Art in Warsaw.

== Exhibitions ==
=== Individual exhibitions ===
- READING DUST, Stedelijk Museum Amsterdam, 2024
- Miriam CAHN: Ma pensée serielle, Palais de Tokyo, Paris 2023
- Miriam Cahn: ME AS HAPPENING, Kunsthal Charlottenborg (Copenhagen), 2020–21
- Sifang Art Museum, Nanjing, 2019
- Miriam Cahn: I as Human, Museum of Modern Art in Warsaw, 2019
- Miriam Cahn: I as Human, Haus der Kunst, Munich, 2019
- everything is equally important, Museo Nacional Centro de Arte Reina Sofia, Madrid, 2019
- DAS GENAUE HINSCHAUEN, Kunsthaus Bregenz, 2019
- ICH ALS MENSCH, Kunstmuseum Bern, 2019
- devoir-aimer, Galerie Jocelyn Wolff, Paris, 2017
- mare nostrum, Meyer Riegger, Berlin, 2016
- Lachen bei gefahr, Badischer Kunstverein, Karlsruhe, 2012
- Sarajevo, Stampa, Basel, 1993
- Stampa, Basel, 1994
- Nachkrieg-Vorkrieg (Was Fehlt), Stampe, Basel, 1992
- Museum für Moderne Kunst, Frankfurt am Main, 1992, 1995
- Verwandschaften, Galerie Espace, Amsterdam, 1991
- Verwandschaften, Stampa, Basel, 1990
- Verwandschaften, Art Frankfurt, 1990
- Verwandschaften, Cornerhouse, Manchester, 1990
- Elisabeth Kaufmann, Zurich, 1988
- Van de Loo, Munich, 1988
- Lesen in Staub, Gemeentemuseum, Arnhem, 1988
- Lesen in Staub, Haus am Waldsee, Berlin, 1988
- Lesen in Staub/Weibliche Monate, Kunstverein Hannover, 1988
- Musée Rath, Geneva, 1988
- Lesen in Staub/Strategische Orte, Galerie Schmela, Düsseldorf, 1987
- Centre Culturel Suisse, Paris, 1987
- Galerie Vorsetzen, Hamberg, 1987
- Stampa, Basel, 1987
- Strategische Orte, DAAD, Berlin, 1986
- Strategische Orte, Stampa, Basel, 1986
- Strategische Orte, Kunsthalle Baden-Baden, and Kunstmuseum, Bonn, 1985
- Strategische Orte, Elisabeth Kaufmann, Zurich, 1985
- Das Klassische Lieben, Musée la Chaux-de-Fonds, 1984
- Das Klassische Lieben, Galerie Grita Insam, Vienna, 1984
- Das Klassische Lieben, Stampa, Basel, 1984
- Das Klassische Lieben, Kunsthalle Basel, 1983
- Wach Raum 1, Konrad Fischer, Zurich, 1982
- Stampa, Basel, 1977, 1979, 1981

=== Selected group exhibitions ===
- Documenta 14, Athens, Greece and Kassel, Germany, 2017
- 21st Sydney Biennal, 2018
- Prière de toucher – Le tactile dans l'art, Museum Tinguely, Basel, 2016
- Module mai, Palais de Tokyo, Paris, 2010
- Sammlung Van de Loo, Neue National galerie Berlin, 2004
- Where Is Abel, Your Brother?, Zachęta – National Gallery of Art, Warsaw, 1995
- From Beyond the Pale, Irish Museum of Modern Art, Dublin, 1994
- Centre d'Art Contemporian, Geneva, 1994
- Zur Sache Selbst, Künstlerinnen des 20. Jahrhunderts Museum, Wiesbaden, 1990
- Triennal de Dibuix, Fundació Joan Miró, Barcelona, 1989
- Sydney Biennal, 1986
- Crosscurrents in Swiss Art, Serpentine Gallery, London, 1984
- Documenta, Kassel, Germany, 1982
- Feministische Kunst International, Frauenzimmer, Basel, 1979
- Claudia Martínez Garay and Miriam Cahn: Ten Thousand Things, Sifang Art Museum, Nanjing, 2020
