= Aneta Grzeszykowska =

Polish artist

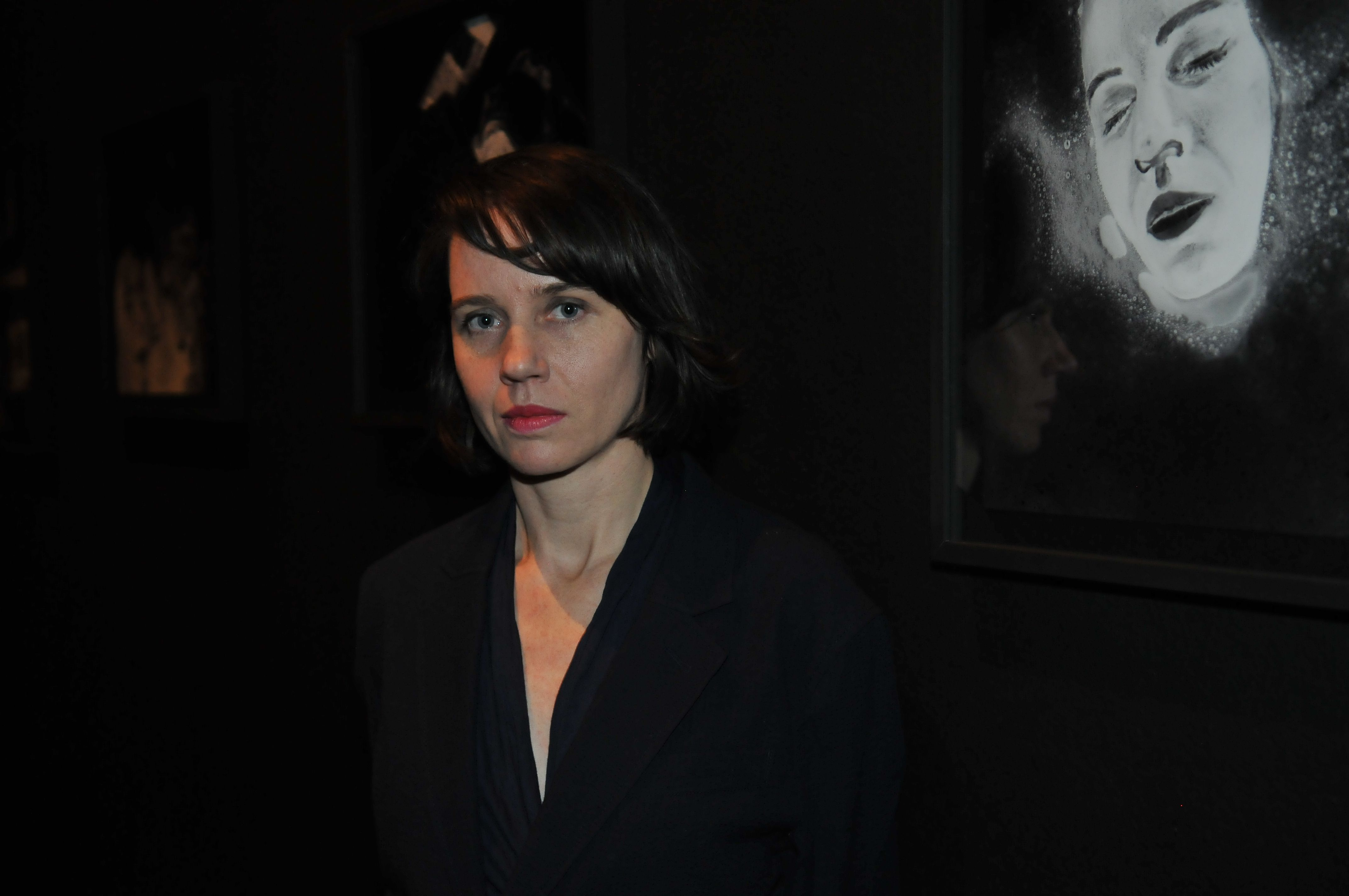
Aneta Grzeszykowska in front of her work from the Negative Book series

Aneta Grzeszykowska (1974) is a Polish Artist.

Her work is included in the collections of the Guggenheim Museum, New York, the Seattle Art Museum, the Rubell Museum, Miami, the Museum of Modern Art, Warsaw and the Zachęta National Gallery of Art.
