= The Venetians (sculptures) =

The Venetians is a 90 figure 2013 sculptural group created by the Polish visial artist Pawel Althamer (b. 1967) for the 55th Venice Biennale. Cast in plastic, the artist captured the hands and countenances of Venetians in plastic before connecting them to corpuses made of extruded plastic ribbons.

The work en total was subsequently exhibited in 2014 at the f!irst U.S. museum survey of Althamer's opus at the New Museum in New York City. The pieces were created with the help of the artist's father's plastics firm
