= TypoPolo =

Style of advertising in Poland

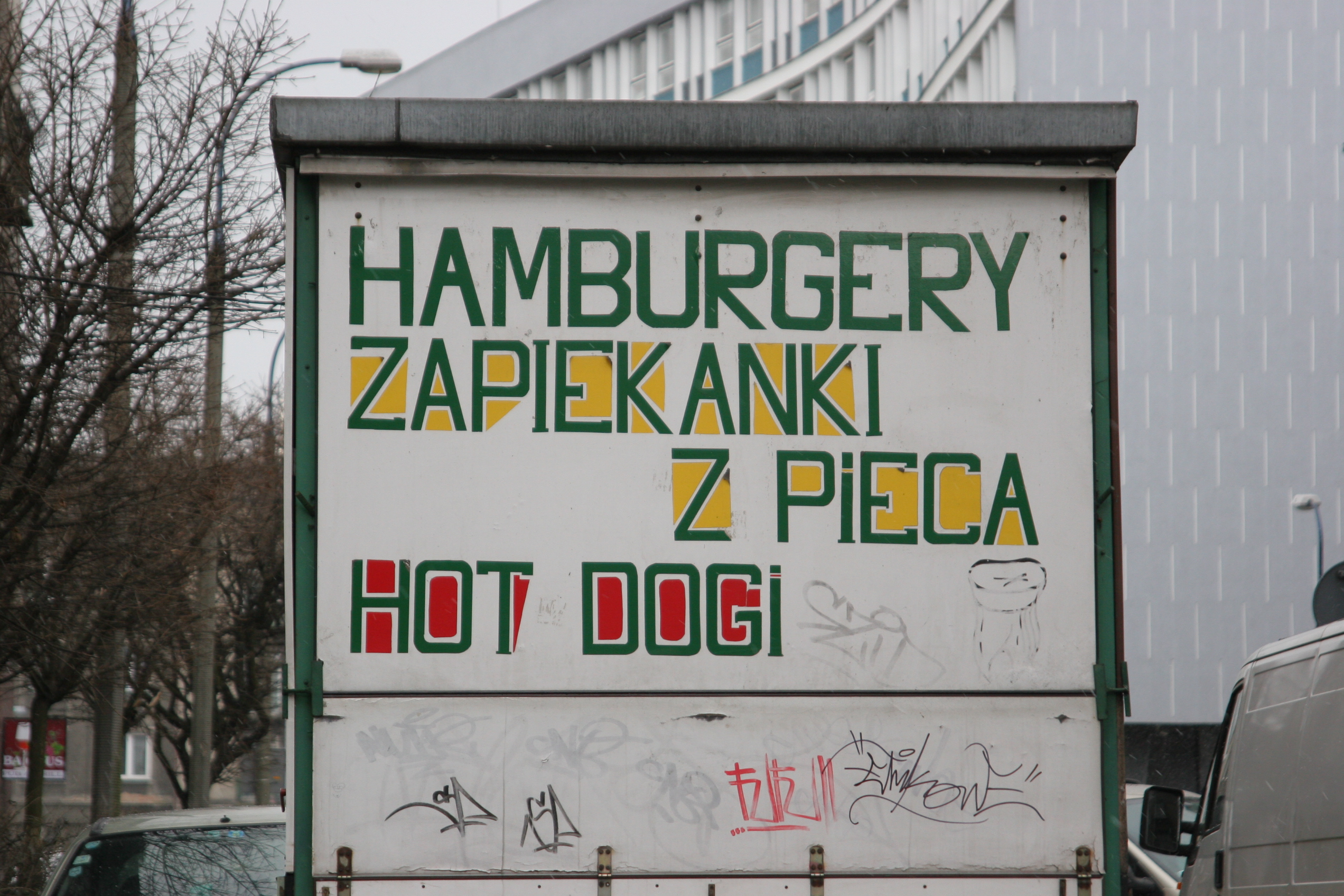
An example of TypoPolo used on a sign advertising fast food, including zapiekanka, in Kraków

TypoPolo is a term applied to the vernacular graphic design that emerged in Poland during the 1990s. TypoPolo was used by small businesses to advertise themselves in response to the economic changes wrought by the collapse of communism and the effects of shock therapy. It has been viewed as a notable element of visual culture in post-communist Poland.

== History ==
Following the collapse of communism, small business owners in Poland adopted a naïve design aesthetic in order to advertise their services. The style became a popular way to stand out amongst the competition in the 1990s. The phrase TypoPolo was coined in 2001 by the poster artist Jakub Stępień in order to describe the particular Polish form of graphic design. Referencing disco polo, the term connotes shopfront lettering and advertising that is seen as kitsch.

In 2014, the Museum of Modern Art and the BWA-Design gallery organised an exhibition of TypoPolo that was displayed in Warsaw and Wrocław respectively.

== Gallery ==
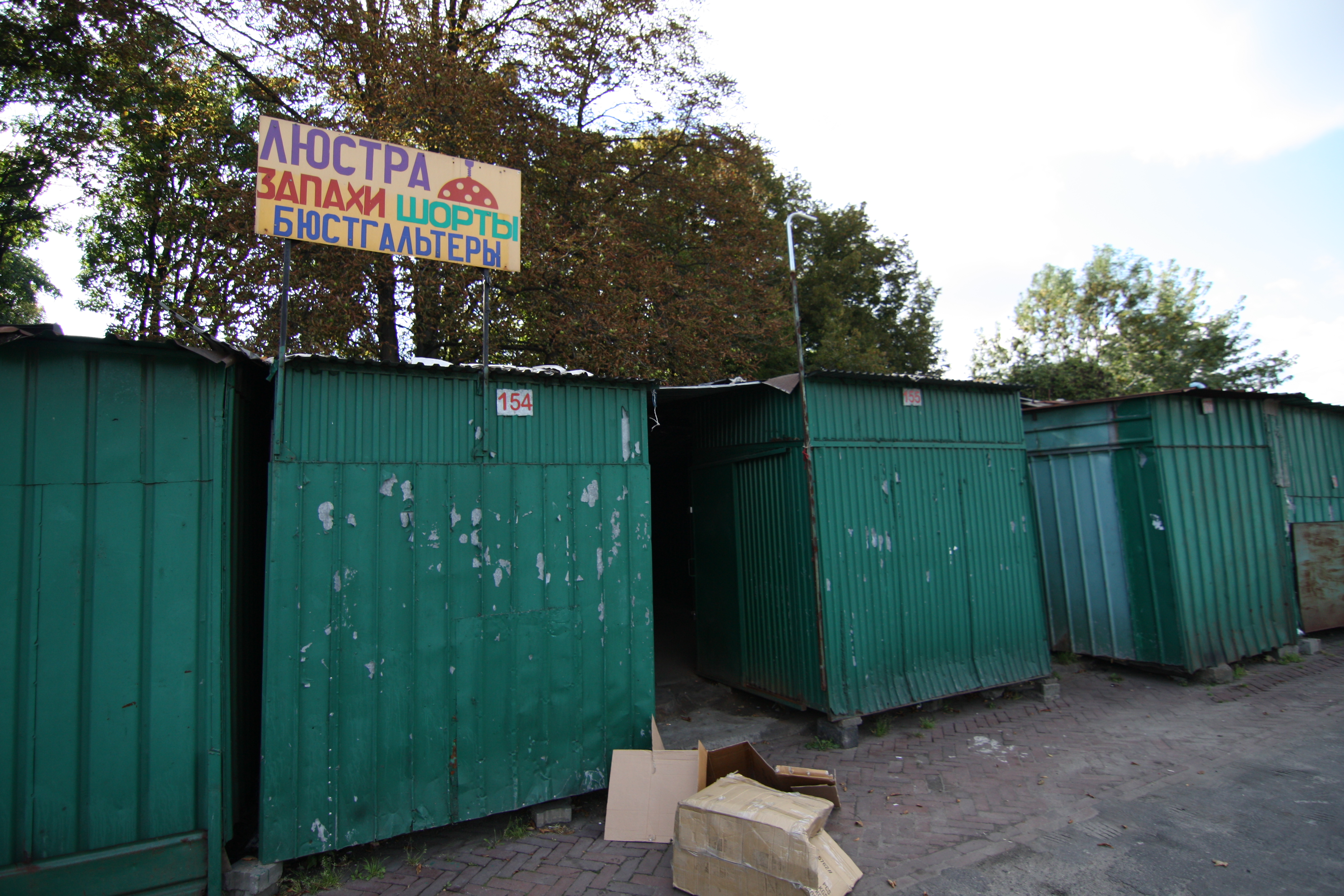
A TypoPolo design in Cyrillic script at the 10th-Anniversary Stadium, 2008

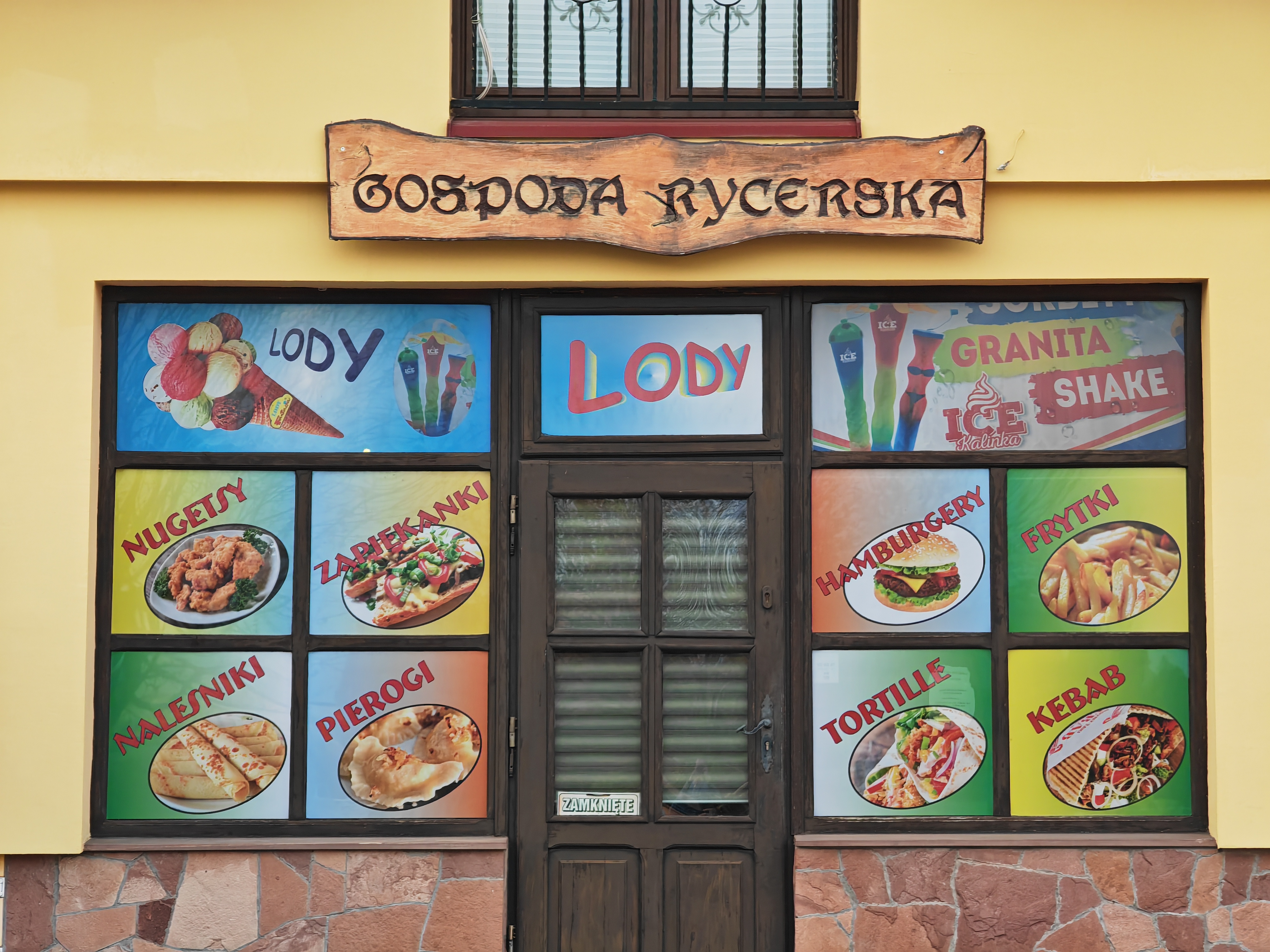
A food outlet in Szydłów

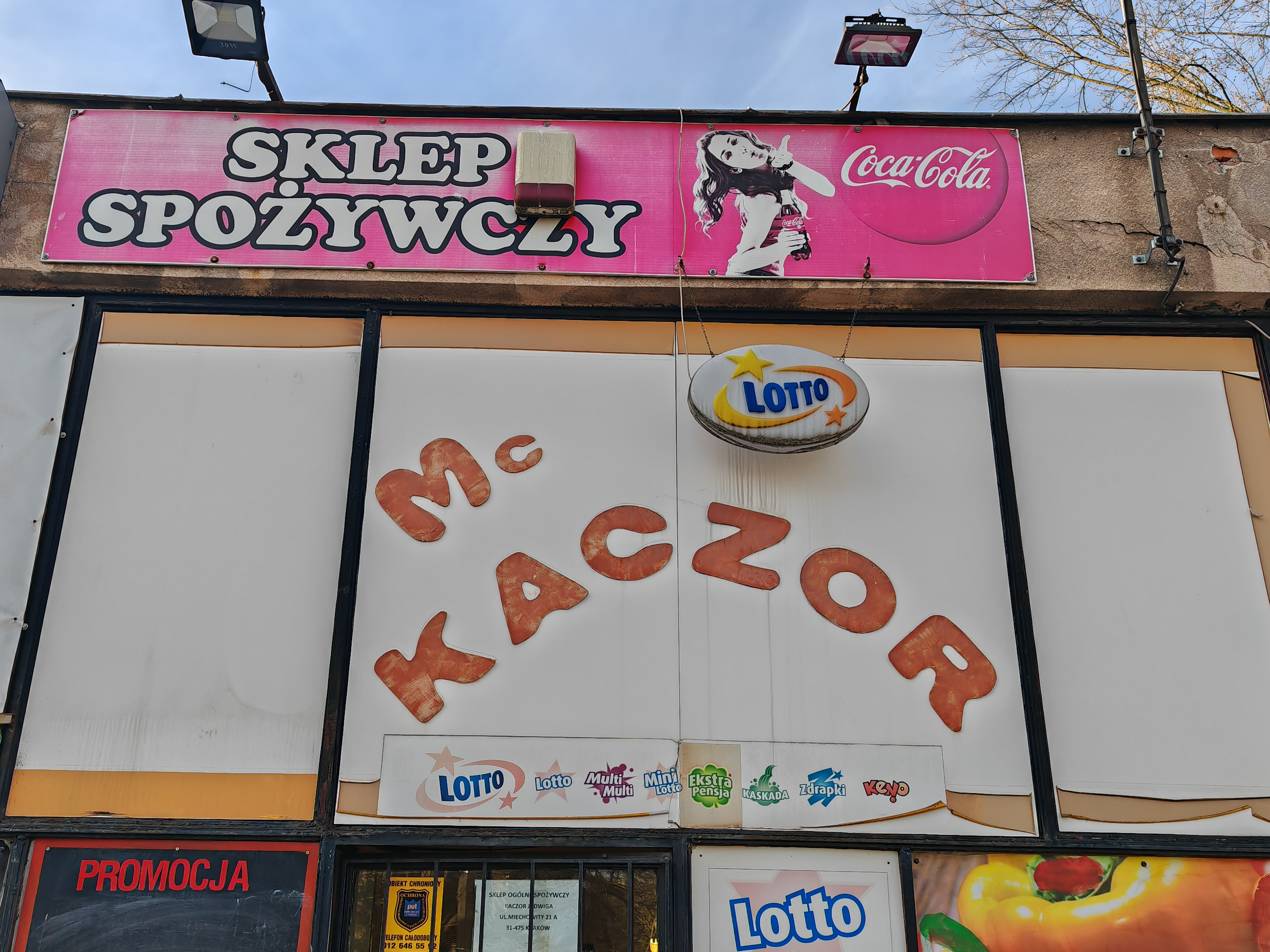
Sign of the McKaczor shop in Kraków

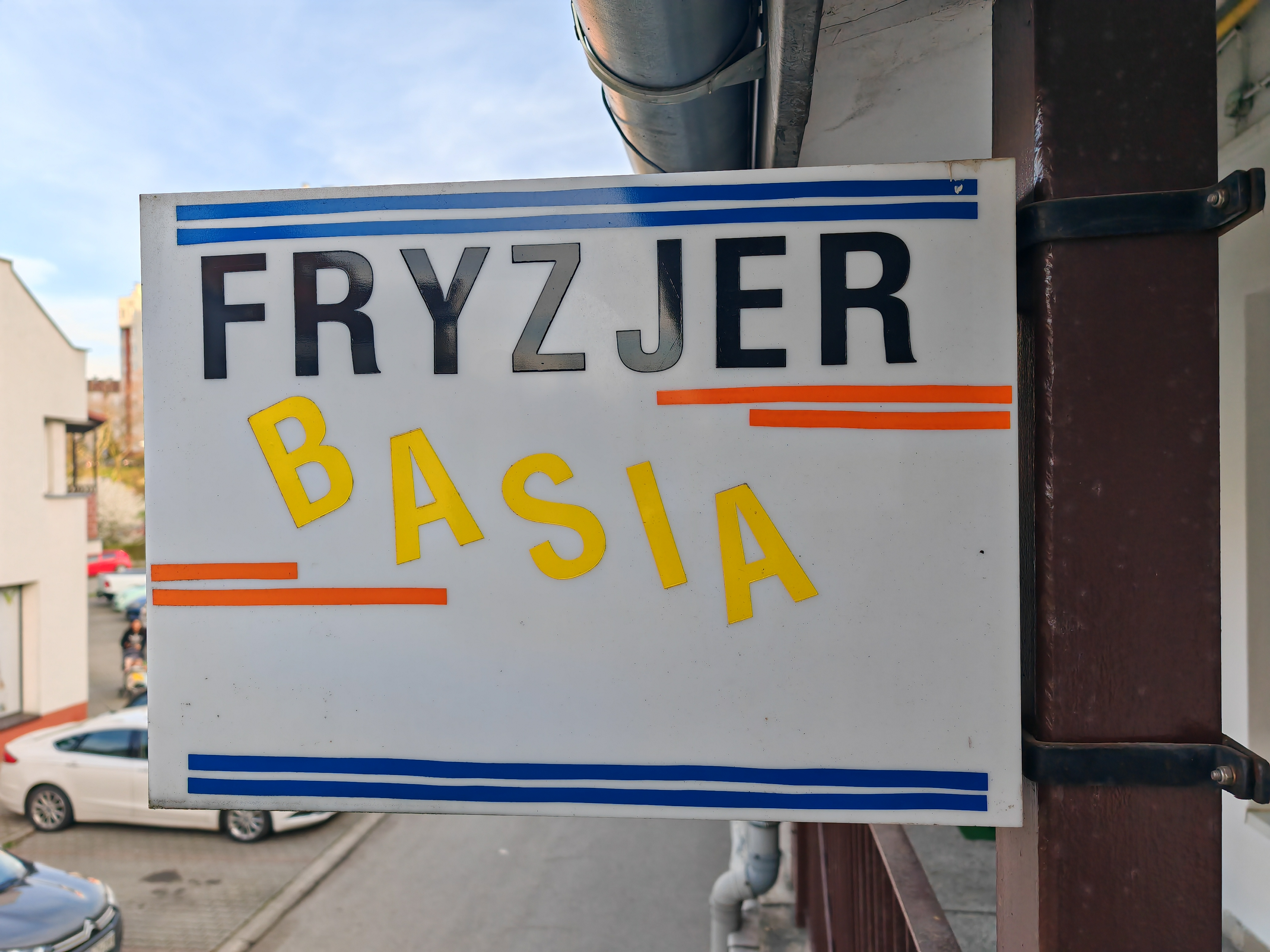
A sign outside a barber shop in Kraków

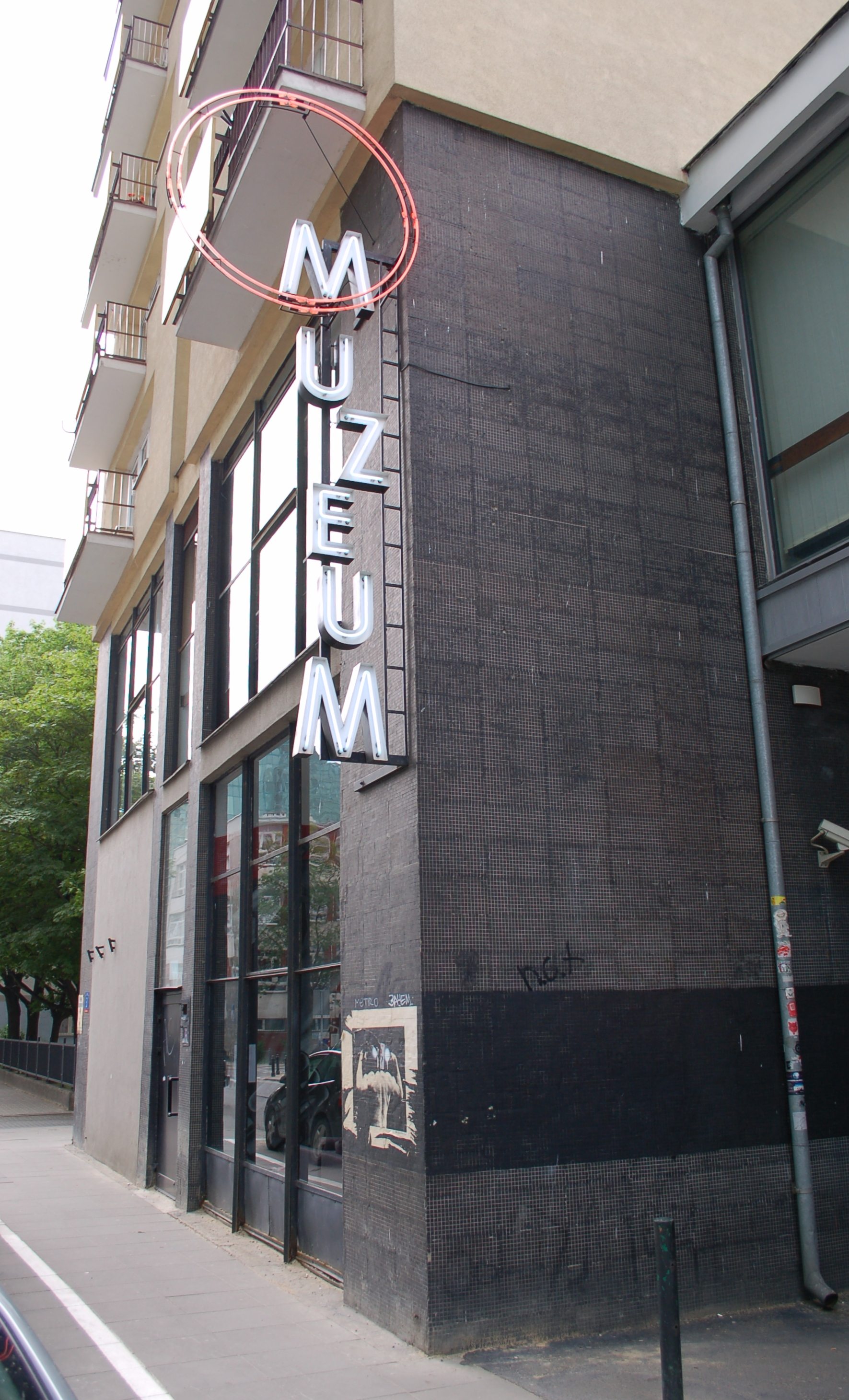
Sign of the Museum of Modern Art in Warsaw, the design of which drew inspiration from TypoPolo and the Polish road signs typeface
