= Jens Haaning =

Danish artist (born 1965)

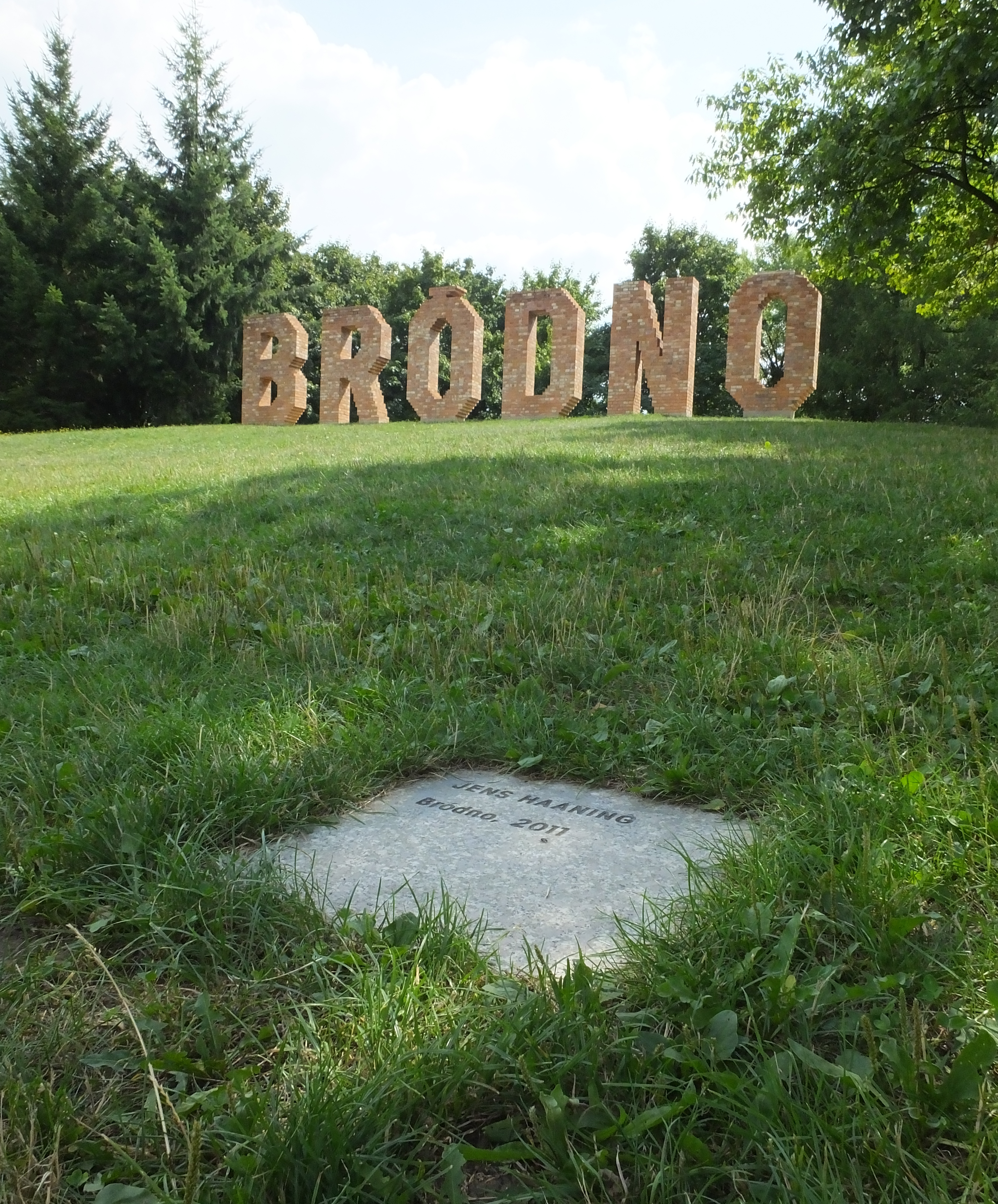
"Bródno" – Bródno Sculpture Park in Warsaw (Poland)

Jens Haaning (born 1965) is a Danish conceptual, contemporary artist living and working in Copenhagen. His subject matter includes changing society in the West, power and communication in the global society, migration, displacement, nationalism, and human coexistence.

In 2021, his piece, Take the Money and Run, gained significant media attention after Haaning pocketed the approximately 532,000 Danish Kroner the commissioner of the work had intended to be included in the finished piece.

== Exhibitions ==
Haaning's main exhibitions: Documenta XI, Kassel, Germany (2002), the 9th Istanbul Biennial, Istanbul, Turkey (2005), Traffic at CAPC Museé d'art contemporain, Bordeaux, France (1996), Vienna Secession, Vienna, Austria (1997, 1998, 2007), Publicness at ICA, London, England (2003), the 6th Gwangju Biennale, Gwangju, South Korea (2002, 2006) and Göteborg International Biennial for Contemporary Art, Gothenburg, Sweden (2017) showed Haaning’s works from the 1990s until 2017.

Examples of his interventions in institutional structures or public spaces include: Middelburg Summer 1996 (1996), a temporary relocation of a factory employing immigrant workers to the exhibition space in De Vleeshal, Middelburg, The Netherlands; and Turkish Jokes (1994), a sound piece with a tape-recording of jokes, told by Turks in their native language, which was originally played in a public square in Oslo, Norway.

== Take the Money and Run ==
In 2021, Haaning was lent $84,000 to create pieces for KUNSTEN Museum of Modern Art Aalborg in Denmark, to recreate two earlier works. Haaning was originally supposed to recreate two pieces from 2007 and 2010 that used real cash affixed to canvases to show the average annual income of Danes and Austrians, respectively. As part of the new commission, the Kunsten loaned the artist bills valued at approximately 532,000 DKK ($76,000) to use in the works, as well as an artist’s fee of about 40,000 krone. When the transport boxes with Haaning’s work arrived, museum staff opened them to find two framed blank canvases entitled Take the Money and Run.

The museum put the new artworks on display, but when Haaning declined to return the money, it took legal action. Haaning told Danish radio at the time: "The work is that I have taken their money. It’s not theft. It is a breach of contract, and breach of contract is part of the work." After lengthy legal proceedings, the Copenhagen court ordered Haaning to repay most of the money. The judgment, published on 18 September 2023, deducted 40,000 Danish Kroner ($5,700) from the repayment amount, allowing Haaning to keep it as an artist and display fee since the museum did end up using Take the Money and Run in the exhibition.
