= Take the Money and Run (artwork) =

2021 artwork by Jens Haaning

Take the Money and Run is a piece of artwork by Jens Haaning, commissioned by the Kunsten Museum of Modern Art Aalborg in Denmark in 2021. The artwork consists of an empty canvas, intended to act as a commentary on poor work wages.

The Kunsten Museum commissioned Haaning to reproduce two of his earlier pieces in which he represented the annual wages of Austrian and Danish workers by framing piles of real kroner and euro bills, offering the artist with 532,549 Danish kroner worth of bills to use for the reproductions; instead, Haaning delivered two blank canvases to the museum. The museum demanded that Haaning return the money that was intended to be incorporated into the artwork, and in turn triggered a response from the artist:

This is only a piece of art if I don't return the money.

— Jens Haaning

Kunsten Museum later filed a civil lawsuit to recover the money from Haaning. In September 2023, Haaning was ordered by Copenhagen City Court to repay 492,549kr; the original amount, minus 40,000kr for artist's and viewing fees, as the exhibition had gone ahead. He was also ordered to pay 78,500kr in court fees.

The verdict was appealed, but before the case went to the national court, in 2024 Jens Haaning and Kunsten settled out of court. The foundation "Den Obelske Familiefond" donated an undisclosed amount to make the settlement possible.

As of 2026, the two canvases were still in the collection of the Kunsten Museum of Modern Art Aalborg and had been exhibited once, in 2025.

== See also ==
- Monochrome painting
- Conceptual art
