= Oskar Dawicki =

Polish writer, poet, sociologist

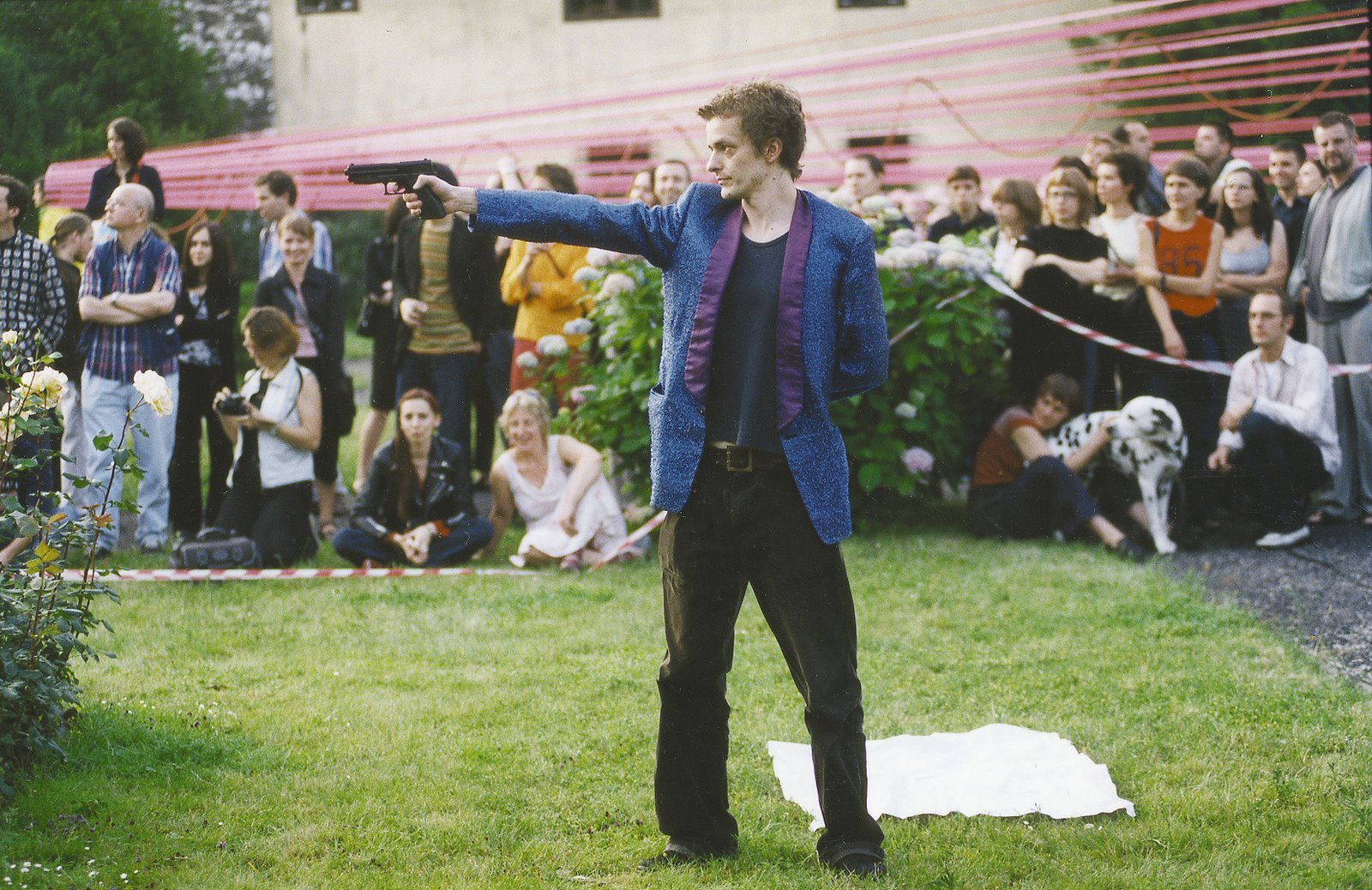
- Born: 28 July 1971 (age 55); Stargard Szczeciński, Szczecin Voivodeship, Polish People's Republic
- Education: Nicolaus Copernicus University
- Occupations: Visual artist, performer

Oskar Dawicki (born 28 July 1971 in Stargard Szczeciński) is a Polish performer and multimedia artist, a graduate of the Fine Arts Faculty at the Nicolaus Copernicus University in Toruń and co-founder of the Azorro Supergroup. He has exhibited nationally and internationally at venues including Zachęta, Manifesta Biennale, Postmasters Gallery, New York, and Warsaw Raster Gallery which represent the artist. Dawicki's life and work has been the subject of a movie, Performer, directed by Maciej Sobieszczański and Łukasz Ronduda which premiered at Berlinale. "Performer" was awarded the "THINK: FILM AWARD" at the Berlinale Film Festival and was screened among others at Tate Modern London, and the Museum of Modern Art in Warsaw.
