= Paweł Althamer =

Polish artist

Pawel Althamer
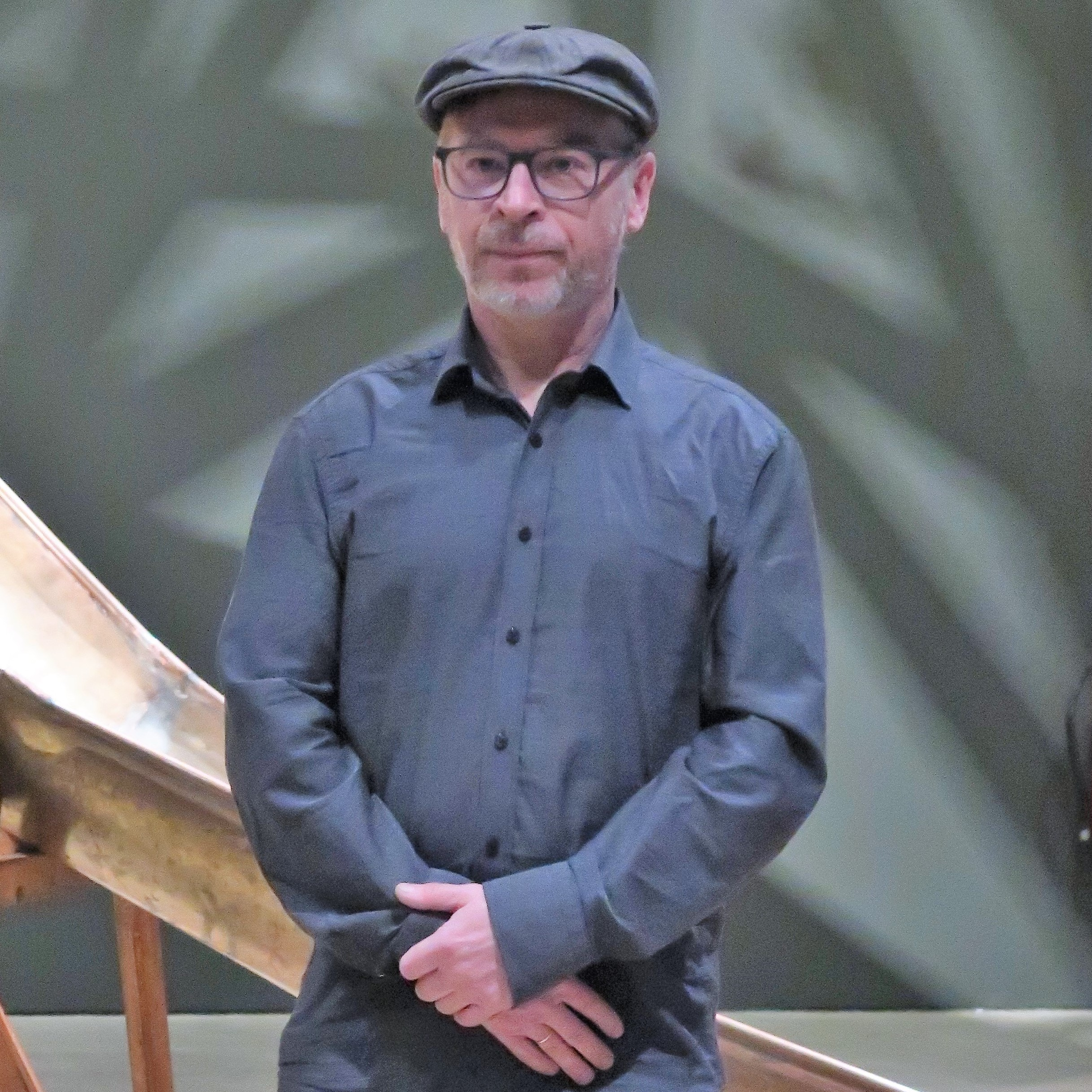
- Pawel Althamer in 2019
- Born: May 12, 1967 (age 59); Warsaw
- Education: Warsaw Academy of Fine Arts
- Known for: sculpture, video art
- Awards: Vincent Award (2004); KAIROS Prize (2013); Order of Polonia Restituta (2015)

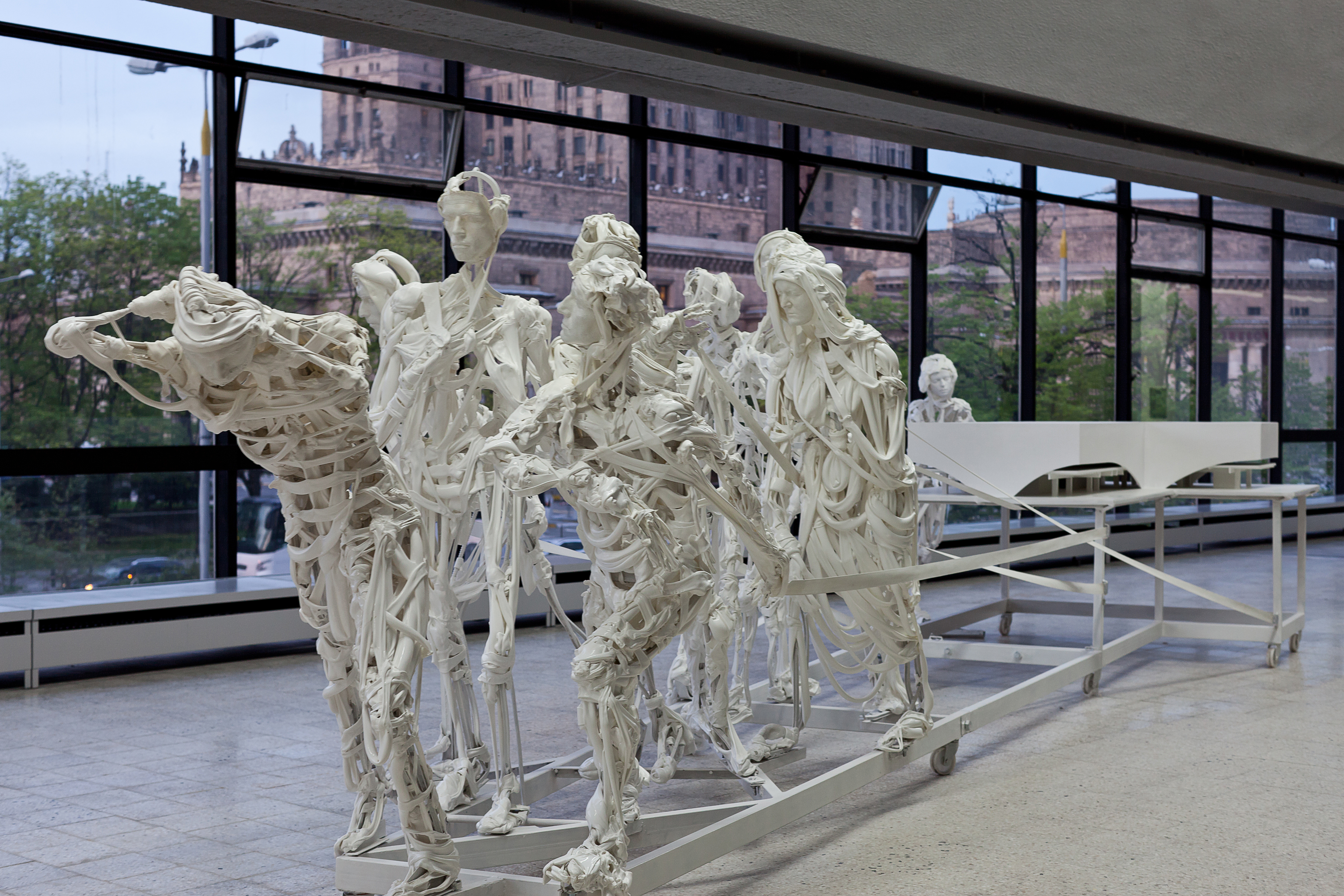
Burłacy, 2012, Museum of Modern Art, Warsaw

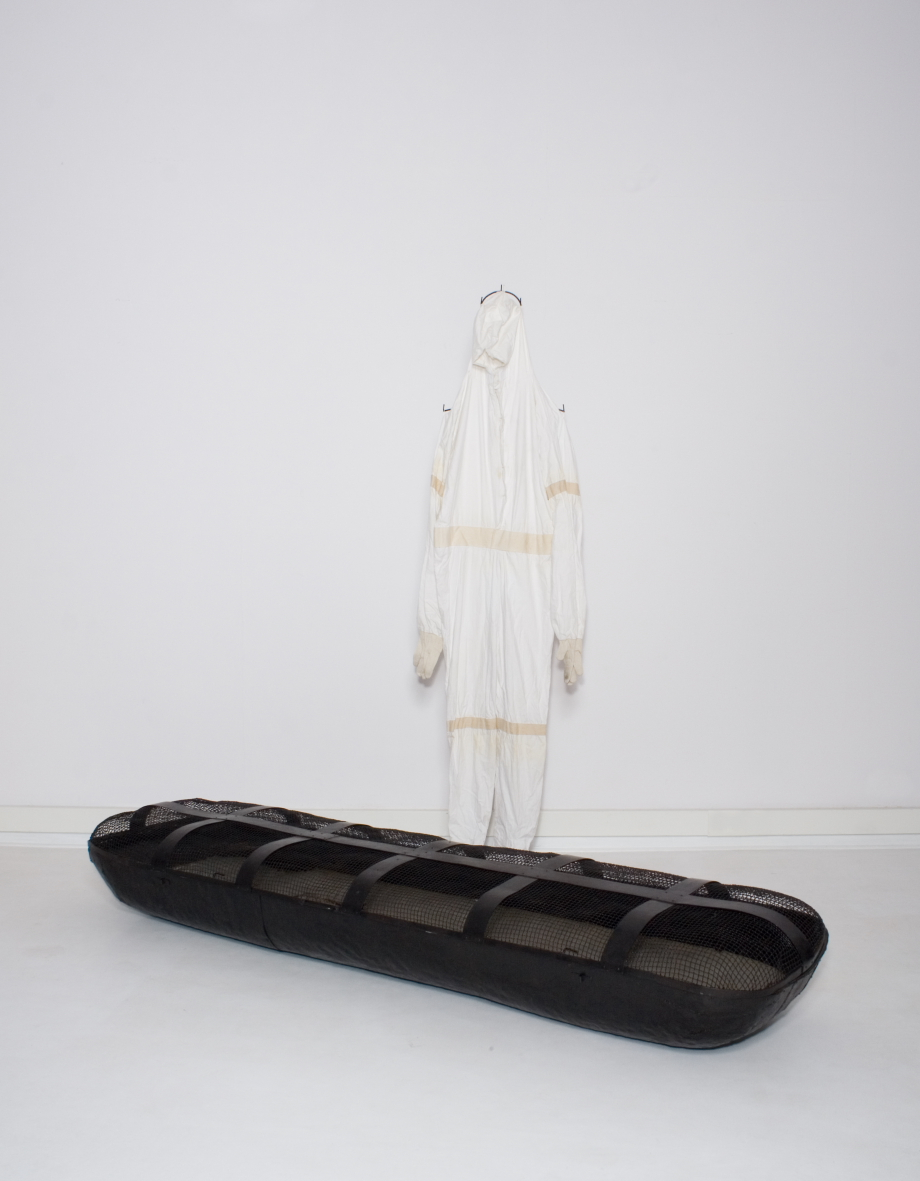
Althamer's A Boat and a Wetsuit, 2010. Permanent collection of the Zachęta National Gallery of Art in Warsaw

Paweł Althamer (born 12 May 1967, Warsaw) is a Polish sculptor, performer, collaborative artist and creator of installations, and video art.

== Life and work ==
In the years 1988–1993, he studied sculpture at the Warsaw Academy of Fine Arts. Beginning in the mid-1990s he collaborated with the Foksal Gallery in Warsaw. In 2000, he participated in Manifesta 3 in Ljubljana, Slovenia. In 2004, he won the Vincent Award from the Broere Charitable Foundation in the Netherlands.

Althamer's series of sculptures "The Venetians" was exhibited in the arsenale section of the 2013 Venice Biennale. Also in 2013, he took part in Performa 13 presenting Biba Performa where he collaborated with multiple artists. In 2015, he was awarded the Officer's Cross of the Order of Polonia Restituta for his artistic achievements.

He is represented by Neugerriemschneider, Berlin and Fundacja Galerii Foksal, Warsaw. His solo exhibitions include Bonnefantenmuseum, Maastricht, Institute of Contemporary Arts, London, Deutsche Guggenheim, Berlin, Musée National d’Art Moderne, Centre Georges Pompidou, Paris New Museum of Contemporary Art, New York, and Helsinki Art Museum.

== See also ==
- List of Polish artists
- Igor Mitoraj
- Alina Szapocznikow
- Wilhelm Sasnal
