= April 12 =

April 12 this year in various calendars
- Sunday, 12 April 2026
Akan	Nwonakwasi
Armenian	26 Ahekani 1475
Aztec	Tlaxochimaco 12, 2 Xōchitl
Babylonian	23 Adaru, 2336 SE
Balinese pawukon	Luang, Pepet, Beteng, Menala, Wage, Aryang, Redite of Landep, Uma, Ogan, Raksasa
Bengali	29 Chaitro, BS 1432
Chinese	Yang Fire Dragon・Emptiness Mansion; Fire Horse Year, Month 2, Day 25 (Qingming, 8 days until Guyu)
Common Era	12 April 2026 CE
Coptic	4 Parmouti, AM 1742
Egyptian	1 Epagomenae, 2774 NE
Ethiopian	4 Miyāzyā, 2018 Amätä Məhrät
French Republican	Décade III, Tridi de Germinal de l'Année 234 de la République
Gregorian	12 April, AD 2026
Hebrew	25 Nisan, AM 5786; Omer 10
Hindu	Śravaṇa・Sādhya; Solar: 30 Caitra, 1947 SE; Lunisolar: Daśamī, Kṛishna pakṣa of Caitra, 2083 VE; Rāudra・5126 KY・1,872,677
Icelandic	Sunnudagur, 20 Einmánuður 2025
Islamic	24 Shawwal, AH 1447 (using tabular method)
ISO week date	2026-W15-7
Japanese	25 Kisaragi, Reiwa 8 (Seimei, 8 days until Kokuu)
Julian	30 March, AD 2026 (AM 7534)
Julian day	2461143
Korean	25 Tokkidal, 4359 DE
Maya	13.0.13.9.0; 13 Pop, 2 Ahau
Roman	ante diem III Kalendas Apriles, MMDCCLXXIX AUC
Solar Hijri	23 Farvardin, SH 1405
Tibetan	25 dbo, me pho rta 2153 or 1772 or 1000

<<	April					>>
Su	Mo	Tu	We	Th	Fr	Sa
			1	2	3	4
5	6	7	8	9	10	11
12	13	14	15	16	17	18
19	20	21	22	23	24	25
26	27	28	29	30
2026

April 12 in recent years
2026 (Sunday)
2025 (Saturday)
2024 (Friday)
2023 (Wednesday)
2022 (Tuesday)
2021 (Monday)
2020 (Sunday)
2019 (Friday)
2018 (Thursday)
2017 (Wednesday)

April 12 is the 102nd day of the year (103rd in leap years) in the Gregorian calendar; 263 days remain until the end of the year.

== Events ==
=== Pre-1600 ===
- 240 – Shapur I becomes co-emperor of the Sasanian Empire with his father Ardashir I.
- 467 – Anthemius is elevated to Emperor of the Western Roman Empire.
- 627 – King Edwin of Northumbria is converted to Christianity by Paulinus, Bishop of York.
- 806 – Nikephoros I of Constantinople is consecrated as patriarch of Constantinople.
- 1159 – Having received the submission of the prince of Antioch, Raynald of Châtillon, Byzantine Emperor Manuel I Komnenos enters triumphantly the city of Antioch.
- 1204 – The Crusaders of the Fourth Crusade breach the walls of Constantinople and enter the city, which they completely occupy the following day.
- 1588 – The Instruction of 12 April 1588 was enacted, which is widely regarded as the formal establishment of the Dutch Republic.

=== 1601–1900 ===
- 1606 – The Union Flag is adopted as the flag of English and Scottish ships.
- 1776 – American Revolution: With the Halifax Resolves, the North Carolina Provincial Congress authorizes its Congressional delegation to vote for independence from Britain.
- 1782 – American Revolution: A Royal Navy fleet led by Admiral George Rodney defeats a French fleet led by the Comte de Grasse at the Battle of the Saintes off Dominica in the Caribbean Sea.
- 1796 – War of the First Coalition: Napoleon Bonaparte wins his first victory as an army commander at the Battle of Montenotte, splitting the Austrian and Piedmontese armies away from each other, and marking the beginning of the Piedmontese surrender in the war.
- 1807 – The Froberg mutiny on Malta ends when the remaining mutineers blow up the magazine of Fort Ricasoli.
- 1820 – Alexander Ypsilantis is declared leader of Filiki Eteria, a secret organization to overthrow Ottoman rule over Greece.
- 1831 – Soldiers marching on the Broughton Suspension Bridge in Manchester, England, cause it to collapse.
- 1861 – American Civil War: Battle of Fort Sumter. The war begins with Confederate forces firing on Fort Sumter, in the harbor of Charleston, South Carolina.
- 1862 – American Civil War: The Andrews Raid (the Great Locomotive Chase) occurs, starting from Big Shanty, Georgia (now Kennesaw).
- 1864 – American Civil War: The Battle of Fort Pillow: Confederate forces kill most of the African American soldiers that surrendered at Fort Pillow, Tennessee.
- 1865 – American Civil War: Mobile, Alabama, falls to the Union Army.
- 1877 – The United Kingdom annexes the Transvaal.
- 1900 – One day after its enactment by the Congress, President William McKinley signs the Foraker Act into law, giving Puerto Rico limited self-rule.

=== 1901–present ===
- 1910 – SMS Zrínyi, one of the last pre-dreadnought battleships built by the Austro-Hungarian Navy, is launched.
- 1917 – World War I: Canadian forces successfully complete the taking of Vimy Ridge from the Germans.
- 1927 – Shanghai massacre of 1927: Chiang Kai-shek orders the Chinese Communist Party members executed in Shanghai, ending the First United Front.
- 1927 – Rocksprings, Texas is hit by an F5 tornado that destroys 235 of the 247 buildings in the town, kills 72 townspeople, and injures 205; third deadliest tornado in Texas history.
- 1928 – The Bremen, a German Junkers W 33 type aircraft, takes off for the first successful transatlantic aeroplane flight from east to west.
- 1934 – The strongest surface wind gust in the world at the time of 231 mph, is measured on the summit of Mount Washington, New Hampshire. It has since been surpassed.
- 1934 – The U.S. Auto-Lite strike begins, culminating in a five-day melee between Ohio National Guard troops and 6,000 strikers and picketers.
- 1937 – Sir Frank Whittle ground-tests the first jet engine designed to power an aircraft, at Rugby, England.
- 1945 – U.S. President Franklin D. Roosevelt dies in office; Vice President Harry S. Truman succeeds him.
- 1945 – World War II: The U.S. Ninth Army under General William H. Simpson crosses the Elbe River astride Magdeburg, and reaches Tangermünde—only 80 kilometres from Berlin.
- 1955 – The polio vaccine, developed by Dr. Jonas Salk, is declared safe and effective.
- 1961 – Space Race: The Soviet cosmonaut Yuri Gagarin becomes the first human to travel into outer space and perform the first crewed orbital flight, Vostok 1.
- 1963 – The Soviet nuclear-powered submarine K-33 collides with the Finnish merchant vessel M/S Finnclipper in the Danish straits.
- 1970 – Soviet submarine K-8, carrying four nuclear torpedoes, sinks in the Bay of Biscay four days after a fire on board.
- 1980 – The Americo-Liberian government of Liberia is violently deposed.
- 1980 – Transbrasil Flight 303, a Boeing 727, crashes on approach to Hercílio Luz International Airport in Florianópolis, Brazil. Fifty-five out of the 58 people on board are killed.
- 1980 – Canadian runner and athlete Terry Fox begins his Marathon of Hope Run in St. John's, NF
- 1981 – The first launch of a Space Shuttle (Columbia) takes place: The STS-1 mission.
- 1983 – Harold Washington is elected as the first black mayor of Chicago.
- 1985 – Space Shuttle Discovery launches on STS-51D to deploy two communications satellites.
- 1990 – Jim Gary's "Twentieth Century Dinosaurs" exhibition opens at the Smithsonian Institution National Museum of Natural History in Washington, D.C. He is the only sculptor ever invited to present a solo exhibition there.
- 1990 – Widerøe Flight 839 crashes after takeoff from Værøy Airport in Norway, killing five people.
- 1992 – The Euro Disney Resort officially opens with its theme park Euro Disneyland; the resort and its park's name are subsequently changed to Disneyland Resort Paris.
- 1999 – United States President Bill Clinton is cited for contempt of court for giving "intentionally false statements" in a civil lawsuit; he is later fined and disbarred.
- 1999 – During the NATO bombing of Yugoslavia, an American McDonnell Douglas F-15E Strike Eagle shoots a passenger train, killing between 20 and 60 people.
- 2002 – A suicide bomber blows herself up at the entrance to Jerusalem's Mahane Yehuda Market, killing seven people and wounding 104.
- 2007 – A suicide bomber penetrates the Green Zone and detonates in a cafeteria within a parliament building, killing Iraqi MP Mohammed Awad and wounding more than twenty other people.
- 2009 – Zimbabwe officially abandons the Zimbabwean dollar as its official currency.
- 2010 – Merano derailment: A rail accident in South Tyrol kills nine people and injures a further 28.
- 2013 – Two suicide bombers kill three Chadian soldiers and injure dozens of civilians at a market in Kidal, Mali.
- 2014 – The Great Fire of Valparaíso ravages the Chilean city of Valparaíso, killing 16 people, displacing nearly 10,000, and destroying more than 2,500 homes.
- 2026 – The Tisza Party, led by Péter Magyar wins the 2026 Hungarian parliamentary election, defeating Viktor Orbán's Fidesz party, which had ruled the country for 16 years, marking the first change in government in Hungary for over a decade.

== Births ==
=== Pre-1600 ===
- 811 – Muhammad al-Jawad, the ninth Imam of Shia Islam (died 835)
- 959 – En'yū, emperor of Japan (died 991)
- 1116 – Richeza of Poland, queen of Sweden and Grand Princess of Minsk (died 1156)
- 1432 – Anne of Austria, Landgravine of Thuringia (died 1462)
- 1484 – Antonio da Sangallo the Younger, Italian architect, designed the Apostolic Palace and St. Peter's Basilica (died 1546)
- 1484 – Maharana Sangram Singh, Rana of Mewar (died 1527)
- 1500 – Joachim Camerarius, German scholar and translator (died 1574)
- 1526 – Muretus, French philosopher and author (died 1585)
- 1550 – Edward de Vere, 17th Earl of Oxford, English courtier and politician, Lord Great Chamberlain (died 1604)
- 1577 – Christian IV of Denmark (died 1648)

=== 1601–1900 ===
- 1612 – Simone Cantarini, Italian painter and engraver (died 1648)
- 1639 – Martin Lister, English naturalist and physician (died 1712)
- 1656 – Benoît de Maillet, French diplomat and natural historian (died 1738)
- 1705 – William Cookworthy, English minister and pharmacist (died 1780)
- 1710 – Caffarelli, Italian actor and singer (died 1783)
- 1713 – Guillaume Thomas François Raynal, French historian and author (died 1796)
- 1716 – Felice Giardini, Italian violinist and composer (died 1796)
- 1722 – Pietro Nardini, Italian violinist and composer (died 1793)
- 1724 – Lyman Hall, American physician, clergyman, and politician, 16th Governor of Georgia (died 1790)
- 1748 – Antoine Laurent de Jussieu, French botanist and author (died 1836)
- 1777 – Henry Clay, American lawyer and politician, 9th United States Secretary of State (died 1852)
- 1792 – John Lambton, 1st Earl of Durham, English soldier and politician, Lord Privy Seal (died 1840)
- 1794 – Germinal Pierre Dandelin, Belgian mathematician and engineer (died 1847)
- 1796 – George N. Briggs, American lawyer and politician, 19th Governor of Massachusetts (died 1861)
- 1799 – Henri Druey, Swiss lawyer and politician, 2nd President of the Swiss Confederation (died 1855)
- 1801 – Joseph Lanner, Austrian composer and conductor (died 1843)
- 1816 – Charles Gavan Duffy, Irish-Australian politician, 8th Premier of Victoria (died 1903)
- 1823 – Alexander Ostrovsky, Russian playwright and translator (died 1886)
- 1839 – Nikolay Przhevalsky, Russian geographer and explorer (died 1888)
- 1845 – Gustaf Cederström, Swedish painter (died 1933)
- 1851 – José Gautier Benítez, Puerto Rican soldier and poet (died 1880)
- 1851 – Edward Walter Maunder, English astronomer and author (died 1928)
- 1852 – Ferdinand von Lindemann, German mathematician and academic (died 1939)
- 1856 – Martin Conway, 1st Baron Conway of Allington, English mountaineer, cartographer, and politician (died 1937)
- 1863 – Raul Pompeia, Brazilian writer (died 1895)
- 1868 – Akiyama Saneyuki, Japanese admiral (died 1918)
- 1869 – Henri Désiré Landru, French serial killer (died 1922)
- 1871 – Ioannis Metaxas, Greek general and politician, 130th Prime Minister of Greece (died 1941)
- 1874 – William B. Bankhead, American lawyer and politician, 47th Speaker of the United States House of Representatives (died 1940)
- 1880 – Addie Joss, American baseball player and journalist (died 1911)
- 1883 – Imogen Cunningham, American photographer and educator (died 1976)
- 1883 – Dally Messenger, Australian rugby player, cricketer, and sailor (died 1959)
- 1884 – Tenby Davies, Welsh runner (died 1932)
- 1884 – Otto Meyerhof, German physician and biochemist, Nobel Prize laureate (died 1951)
- 1885 – Robert Delaunay, French painter (died 1941)
- 1887 – Harold Lockwood, American actor and director (died 1918)
- 1888 – Dan Ahearn, Irish-American long jumper and police officer (died 1942)
- 1888 – Cecil Kimber, English automobile engineer (died 1945)
- 1892 – Henry Darger, American writer and artist (died 1973)
- 1894 – Dorothy Cumming, Australian-American actress (died 1983)
- 1894 – Francisco Craveiro Lopes, Portuguese field marshal and politician, 13th President of Portugal (died 1964)
- 1898 – Lily Pons, French-American soprano and actress (died 1976)

=== 1901–present ===
- 1901 – Lowell Stockman, American farmer and politician (died 1962)
- 1902 – Louis Beel, Dutch academic and politician, 36th Prime Minister of the Netherlands (died 1977)
- 1903 – Jan Tinbergen, Dutch economist and academic, Nobel Prize laureate (died 1994)
- 1907 – Felix de Weldon, Austrian-American sculptor, designed the Marine Corps War Memorial (died 2003)
- 1907 – Zawgyi, Burmese poet, author, literary historian, critic, scholar and academic (died 1990)
- 1908 – Ida Pollock, English author and painter (died 2013)
- 1908 – Robert Lee Scott, Jr., American pilot and general (died 2006)
- 1910 – Gillo Dorfles, Italian art critic, painter and philosopher (died 2018)
- 1910 – Irma Rapuzzi, French politician (died 2018)
- 1911 – Mahmoud Younis, Egyptian engineer (died 1976)
- 1912 – Frank Dilio, Canadian businessman (died 1997)
- 1912 – Hamengkubuwono IX, Indonesian politician, 2nd Vice President of Indonesia (died 1988)
- 1912 – Hound Dog Taylor, American singer-songwriter and guitarist (died 1975)
- 1913 – Keiko Fukuda, Japanese-American martial artist (died 2013)
- 1914 – Armen Alchian, American economist and academic (died 2013)
- 1916 – Beverly Cleary, American author (died 2021)
- 1916 – Russell Garcia, American-New Zealand composer and conductor (died 2011)
- 1916 – Benjamin Libet, American neuropsychologist and academic (died 2007)
- 1917 – Helen Forrest, American singer and actress (died 1999)
- 1917 – Vinoo Mankad, Indian cricketer (died 1978)
- 1917 – Robert Manzon, French racing driver (died 2015)
- 1919 – István Anhalt, Hungarian-Canadian composer and educator (died 2012)
- 1919 – Billy Vaughn, American musician and bandleader (died 1991)
- 1921 – Robert Cliche, Canadian lawyer, judge, and politician (died 1978)
- 1922 – Simon Kapwepwe, Zambian politician, 2nd Vice President of Zambia (died 1980)
- 1923 – Ann Miller, American actress, singer, and dancer (died 2004)
- 1924 – Raymond Barre, French economist and politician, Prime Minister of France (died 2007)
- 1924 – Peter Safar, Austrian physician and academic (died 2003)
- 1924 – Curtis Turner, American race car driver (died 1970)
- 1925 – Evelyn Berezin, American computer scientist and engineer (died 2018)
- 1925 – Ned Miller, American country music singer and songwriter (died 2016)
- 1925 – Oliver Postgate, English animator, puppeteer, and screenwriter (died 2008)
- 1926 – Jane Withers, American actress (died 2021)
- 1927 – Thomas Hemsley, English baritone (died 2013)
- 1927 – Alvin Sargent, American screenwriter (died 2019)
- 1928 – Hardy Krüger, German actor (died 2022)
- 1928 – Jean-François Paillard, French conductor (died 2013)
- 1929 – Elspet Gray, Scottish actress (died 2013)
- 1929 – Mukhran Machavariani, Georgian poet and educator (died 2010)
- 1930 – John Landy, Australian runner and politician, 26th Governor of Victoria (died 2022)
- 1930 – Bryan Magee, English philosopher and politician (died 2019)
- 1930 – Manuel Neri, American sculptor and painter (died 2021)
- 1930 – Pythagoras Papastamatiou, Greek lyricist and playwright (died 1979)
- 1930 – Michał Życzkowski, Polish technician and educator (died 2006)
- 1931 – Leonid Derbenyov, Russian poet and songwriter (died 1995)
- 1932 – Lakshman Kadirgamar, Sri Lankan lawyer and politician, 5th Sri Lankan Minister of Foreign Affairs (died 2005)
- 1932 – Herbert Butros Khaury, American singer and ukulele player (died 1996)
- 1932 – Jean-Pierre Marielle, French actor (died 2019)
- 1933 – Montserrat Caballé, Spanish soprano and actress (died 2018)
- 1934 – Heinz Schneiter, Swiss footballer and manager (died 2017)
- 1935 – Jimmy Makulis, Greek singer (died 2007)
- 1936 – Tony Earl, American politician, 40th Governor of Wisconsin (died 2023)
- 1936 – Charles Napier, American actor (died 2011)
- 1936 – Kennedy Simmonds, Kittitian politician, 4th Prime Minister of Saint Kitts and Nevis
- 1937 – Dennis Banks, American author and activist (died 2017)
- 1937 – Igor Volk, Ukrainian-Russian colonel, pilot, and astronaut (died 2017)
- 1939 – Alan Ayckbourn, English director and playwright
- 1939 – Johnny Raper, Australian rugby league player and coach (died 2022)
- 1940 – Woodie Fryman, American baseball player (died 2011)
- 1940 – Herbie Hancock, American pianist, composer, and bandleader
- 1941 – Bobby Moore, English footballer and manager (died 1993)
- 1942 – Bill Bryden, Scottish actor, director, and screenwriter (died 2022)
- 1942 – Carlos Reutemann, Argentinian race car driver and politician (died 2021)
- 1942 – Jacob Zuma, South African politician, 4th President of South Africa
- 1943 – Sumitra Mahajan, Indian politician, 16th Speaker of the Lok Sabha
- 1944 – Lisa Jardine, English historian, author, and academic (died 2015)
- 1944 – John Kay, German-Canadian singer-songwriter, guitarist, and producer
- 1945 – Lee Jong-wook, South Korean physician and diplomat (died 2006)
- 1946 – John Dunsworth, Canadian actor and comedian (died 2017)
- 1946 – Ed O'Neill, American actor and comedian
- 1946 – George Robertson, Baron Robertson of Port Ellen, Scottish politician and diplomat, 10th Secretary General of NATO
- 1947 – Roy M. Anderson, English epidemiologist, zoologist, and academic
- 1947 – Martin Brasier, English palaeontologist, biologist, and academic (died 2014)
- 1947 – Tom Clancy, American historian and author (died 2013)
- 1947 – David Letterman, American comedian and talk show host
- 1947 – Wayne Northrop, American actor (died 2024)
- 1948 – Jeremy Beadle, English television host and producer (died 2008)
- 1948 – Joschka Fischer, German academic and politician
- 1948 – Christos Iakovou, Greek weightlifter
- 1948 – Marcello Lippi, Italian footballer, manager, and coach
- 1949 – Scott Turow, American lawyer and author
- 1949 – Pravin Gordhan, South African politician (died 2024)
- 1950 – Joyce Banda, Malawian politician, 4th president of Malawi
- 1950 – Flavio Briatore, Italian businessman
- 1950 – David Cassidy, American singer-songwriter and guitarist (died 2017)
- 1950 – Nicholas Sackman, English composer and educator
- 1951 – Tom Noonan, American actor (died 2026)
- 1952 – Reuben Gant, American football player
- 1952 – Leicester Rutledge, New Zealand rugby player
- 1952 – Gary Soto, American poet, novelist, and memoirist
- 1952 – Ralph Wiley, American journalist (died 2004)
- 1953 – Tanino Liberatore, Italian author and illustrator
- 1954 – John Faulkner, Australian educator and politician, 52nd Australian Minister for Defence
- 1954 – Steve Stevaert, Belgian businessman and politician (died 2015)
- 1954 – Pat Travers, Canadian singer-songwriter and guitarist
- 1955 – Fabian Hamilton, English graphic designer, engineer, and politician
- 1956 – Andy Garcia, Cuban-American actor, director, and producer
- 1956 – Herbert Grönemeyer, German singer-songwriter and actor
- 1957 – Greg Child, Australian mountaineer and author
- 1957 – Vince Gill, American singer-songwriter and guitarist
- 1957 – Tama Janowitz, American novelist and short story writer
- 1958 – Will Sergeant, English guitarist
- 1958 – Klaus Tafelmeier, German javelin thrower
- 1958 – Ginka Zagorcheva, Bulgarian hurdler
- 1960 – David Thirdkill, American basketball player
- 1961 – Corrado Fabi, Italian racing driver
- 1961 – Charles Mann, American football player and sportscaster
- 1961 – Magda Szubanski, English-Australian actress, comedian and writer
- 1962 – Art Alexakis, American singer-songwriter and musician
- 1962 – Carlos Sainz, Spanish racing driver
- 1962 – Nobuhiko Takada, Japanese mixed martial artist and wrestler, founded Hustle
- 1963 – Lydia Cacho, Mexican journalist and author
- 1964 – Chris Fairclough, English footballer and coach
- 1964 – Amy Ray, American folk-rock singer-songwriter, musician, and music producer
- 1965 – Kim Bodnia, Danish actor and director
- 1965 – Chi Onwurah, English politician
- 1965 – Gervais Rufyikiri, Burundian politician
- 1965 – Mihai Stoica, Romanian footballer and manager
- 1966 – Nils-Olav Johansen, Norwegian guitarist and singer
- 1966 – Lorenzo White, American football player
- 1967 – Sarah Cracknell, English singer-songwriter
- 1968 – Alicia Coppola, American actress
- 1968 – Toby Gad, German songwriter and producer
- 1968 – Adam Graves, Canadian ice hockey player
- 1969 – Michael Jackson, American football player and politician (died 2017)
- 1969 – Jörn Lenz, German footballer and manager
- 1969 – Lucas Radebe, South African footballer and sportscaster
- 1970 – Sylvain Bouchard, Canadian speed skater
- 1971 – Nicholas Brendon, American actor (died 2026)
- 1971 – Shannen Doherty, American actress, director, and producer (died 2024)
- 1972 – Paul Lo Duca, American baseball player and sportscaster
- 1973 – J. Scott Campbell, American author and illustrator
- 1973 – Ryan Kisor, American trumpet player and composer
- 1973 – Antonio Osuna, Mexican-American baseball player
- 1973 – Christian Panucci, Italian footballer and manager
- 1974 – Belinda Emmett, Australian actress (died 2006)
- 1974 – Bryan Fletcher, Australian rugby league player and sportscaster
- 1974 – Roman Hamrlík, Czech ice hockey player
- 1974 – Marley Shelton, American actress
- 1974 – Sylvinho, Brazilian footballer and manager
- 1976 – Olga Kotlyarova, Russian runner
- 1976 – Brad Miller, American basketball player
- 1977 – Giovanny Espinoza, Ecuadorian footballer
- 1977 – Sarah Monahan, Australian actress
- 1977 – Jason Price, Welsh footballer
- 1977 – Glenn Rogers, Australian-Scottish cricketer
- 1978 – Guy Berryman, Scottish bassist (Coldplay)
- 1978 – Scott Crary, American director, producer, and screenwriter
- 1978 – Svetlana Lapina, Russian high jumper
- 1978 – Robin Walker, English businessman and politician
- 1979 – Claire Danes, American actress
- 1979 – Elena Grosheva, Russian gymnast
- 1979 – Mateja Kežman, Serbian footballer
- 1979 – Jennifer Morrison, American actress
- 1979 – Sergio Pellissier, Italian footballer
- 1979 – Cristian Ranalli, Italian footballer
- 1979 – Lee Soo-young, South Korean singer
- 1980 – Sara Head, Welsh Paralympic table tennis champion
- 1980 – Brian McFadden, Irish singer-songwriter
- 1981 – Yuriy Borzakovskiy, Russian runner
- 1981 – Nicolás Burdisso, Argentinian footballer
- 1981 – Tulsi Gabbard, American politician
- 1981 – Grant Holt, English footballer and professional wrestler
- 1981 – Hisashi Iwakuma, Japanese baseball pitcher
- 1983 – Jelena Dokic, Serbian-Australian tennis player
- 1983 – Luke Kibet, Kenyan runner
- 1984 – Aleksey Dmitrik, Russian high jumper
- 1985 – Brennan Boesch, American baseball player
- 1985 – Hitomi Yoshizawa, Japanese singer
- 1986 – Blerim Džemaili, Swiss footballer
- 1986 – Marcel Granollers, Spanish tennis player
- 1986 – Jonathan Pitroipa, Burkinabé footballer
- 1987 – Luiz Adriano, Brazilian professional footballer
- 1987 – Brooklyn Decker, American model and actress
- 1987 – Shawn Gore, Canadian football player
- 1987 – Brendon Urie, American singer, songwriter, musician and multi-instrumentalist
- 1988 – Ricky Álvarez, Argentinian footballer
- 1988 – Stephen Brogan, English footballer
- 1988 – Amedeo Calliari, Italian footballer
- 1988 – Jessie James Decker, American singer-songwriter
- 1988 – Moamen Zakaria, Egyptian footballer
- 1989 – Bethan Dainton, Welsh rugby union player
- 1989 – Ádám Hanga, Hungarian basketball player
- 1989 – Miguel Ángel Ponce, American-Mexican footballer
- 1989 – Valentin Stocker, Swiss footballer
- 1989 – Kaitlyn Weaver, Canadian-American ice dancer
- 1990 – Hiroki Sakai, Japanese footballer
- 1991 – Lionel Carole, French professional footballer
- 1991 – Oliver Norwood, English-born Northern Irish international footballer
- 1991 – Magnus Pääjärvi, Swedish ice hockey player
- 1991 – Jazz Richards, Welsh international footballer
- 1992 – Chad le Clos, South African swimmer
- 1992 – The Vivienne, Welsh drag queen (died 2025)
- 1993 – Robin Anderson, American tennis player
- 1993 – Ryan Nugent-Hopkins, Canadian ice hockey player
- 1994 – Eric Bailly, Ivorian professional footballer
- 1994 – Isabelle Drummond, Brazilian actress and singer
- 1994 – Guido Rodríguez, Argentine footballer
- 1994 – Saoirse Ronan, American-born Irish actress
- 1994 – Sehun, South Korean musician
- 1995 – Pedro Cachin, Argentine tennis player
- 1996 – Jan Bednarek, Polish footballer
- 1996 – Matteo Berrettini, Italian tennis player

== Deaths ==
=== Pre-1600 ===
- 45 BC – Gnaeus Pompeius, Roman general and politician (born 75 BC)
- 352 – Julius I, pope of the Catholic Church
- 434 – Maximianus, archbishop of Constantinople
- 901 – Eudokia Baïana, Byzantine empress and wife of Leo VI
- 1125 – Vladislaus I, Duke of Bohemia (born 1065)
- 1167 – Charles VII, king of Sweden (born c. 1130)
- 1256 – Margaret of Bourbon, Queen of Navarre, regent of Navarre (born c. 1217)
- 1443 – Henry Chichele, English archbishop (born 1364)
- 1500 – Leonhard of Gorizia, Count of Gorz (born 1440)
- 1530 – Joanna La Beltraneja, Princess of Castile (born 1462)
- 1550 – Claude, Duke of Guise (born 1496)
- 1555 – Joanna, Queen of Castile and Aragon (born 1479)

=== 1601–1900 ===
- 1675 – Richard Bennett, English politician, colonial Governor of Virginia (born 1609)
- 1684 – Nicola Amati, Italian instrument maker (born 1596)
- 1687 – Ambrose Dixon, English-American soldier (born 1619)
- 1704 – Jacques-Bénigne Bossuet, French bishop and theologian (born 1627)
- 1748 – William Kent, English architect, designed Holkham Hall and Chiswick House (born 1685)
- 1782 – Metastasio, Italian-Austrian poet and composer (born 1698)
- 1788 – Carlo Antonio Campioni, French-Italian composer (born 1719)
- 1795 – Johann Kaspar Basselet von La Rosée, Bavarian general (born 1710)
- 1814 – Charles Burney, English composer and historian (born 1726)
- 1817 – Charles Messier, French astronomer and academic (born 1730)
- 1850 – Adoniram Judson, American lexicographer and missionary (born 1788)
- 1866 – Peter Hesketh-Fleetwood, English politician, founded Fleetwood (born 1801)
- 1872 – Nikolaos Mantzaros, Greek composer and theorist (born 1795)
- 1878 – William M. Tweed, American lawyer and politician (born 1823)
- 1879 – Richard Taylor, Confederate general (born 1826)
- 1885 – William Crowther, Dutch-Australian politician, 14th Premier of Tasmania (born 1817)
- 1898 – Elzéar-Alexandre Taschereau, Canadian cardinal (born 1820)

=== 1901–present ===
- 1902 – Marie Alfred Cornu, French physicist and academic (born 1842)
- 1906 – Mahesh Chandra Nyayratna Bhattacharyya, Indian scholar, academic, and philanthropist (born 1836)
- 1912 – Clara Barton, American nurse and humanitarian, founded the American Red Cross (born 1821)
- 1920 – Vlasis Gavriilidis, Greek jourtnalist (born 1848)
- 1933 – Adelbert Ames, American general and politician, 30th Governor of Mississippi (born 1835)
- 1937 – Abdülhak Hâmid Tarhan, Turkish playwright and poet (born 1852)
- 1938 – Feodor Chaliapin, Russian opera singer (born 1873)
- 1943 – Viktor Puskar, Estonian colonel (born 1889)
- 1945 – Franklin D. Roosevelt, American lawyer and politician, 32nd President of the United States (born 1882)
- 1953 – Lionel Logue, Australian actor and therapist (born 1880)
- 1962 – Ron Flockhart, Scottish racing driver (born 1923)
- 1966 – Sydney Allard, English racing driver and founder of the Allard car company (born 1910)
- 1968 – Heinrich Nordhoff, German engineer (born 1899)
- 1971 – Ed Lafitte, American baseball player and dentist (born 1886)
- 1973 – Arthur Freed, American songwriter and producer (born 1894)
- 1975 – Josephine Baker, French actress, activist, and humanitarian (born 1906)
- 1976 – Christos Kakkalos, Greek mountain guide (born 1882)
- 1977 – Philip K. Wrigley, American businessman, co-founded Lincoln Park Gun Club (born 1894)
- 1980 – William R. Tolbert, Jr., Liberian politician, 20th President of Liberia (born 1913)
- 1981 – Prince Yasuhiko Asaka of Japan (born 1887)
- 1981 – Joe Louis, American boxer and wrestler (born 1914)
- 1981 – Little River attacks in Durham, North Carolina
- 1983 – Jørgen Juve, Norwegian football player and journalist (born 1906)
- 1983 – Carl Morton, American baseball player (born 1944)
- 1984 – Edwin T. Layton, American admiral and cryptanalyst (born 1903)
- 1986 – Valentin Kataev, Russian author and playwright (born 1897)
- 1988 – Colette Deréal, French singer and actress (born 1927)
- 1988 – Alan Paton, South African historian and author (born 1903)
- 1989 – Abbie Hoffman, American activist, co-founded Youth International Party (born 1936)
- 1989 – Sugar Ray Robinson, American boxer (born 1921)
- 1992 – Ilario Bandini, Italian racing driver and businessman (born 1911)
- 1997 – George Wald, American neurologist and academic, Nobel Prize laureate (born 1906)
- 1998 – Robert Ford, Canadian poet and diplomat (born 1915)
- 1999 – Boxcar Willie, American singer-songwriter (born 1931)
- 2001 – Harvey Ball, American illustrator, created the smiley (born 1921)
- 2002 – George Shevelov, Ukrainian-American linguist and philologist (born 1908)
- 2004 – Moran Campbell, Canadian physician and academic, invented the venturi mask (born 1925)
- 2006 – William Sloane Coffin, American minister and activist (born 1924)
- 2007 – Kevin Crease, Australian journalist (born 1936)
- 2008 – Cecilia Colledge, English-American figure skater and coach (born 1920)
- 2008 – Patrick Hillery, Irish physician and politician, 6th President of Ireland (born 1923)
- 2008 – Jerry Zucker, Israeli-American businessman and philanthropist (born 1949)
- 2009 – Marilyn Chambers, American actress
- 2010 – Michel Chartrand, Canadian trade union leader (born 1916)
- 2010 – Werner Schroeter, German director and screenwriter (born 1945)
- 2011 – Karim Fakhrawi, Bahraini journalist, co-founded Al-Wasat (born 1962)
- 2012 – Mohit Chattopadhyay, Indian poet and playwright (born 1934)
- 2012 – Rodgers Grant, American pianist and composer (born 1935)
- 2013 – Robert Byrne, American chess player and author (born 1928)
- 2013 – Johnny du Plooy, South African boxer (born 1964)
- 2013 – Michael France, American screenwriter (born 1962)
- 2013 – Brennan Manning, American priest and author (born 1934)
- 2013 – Annamária Szalai, Hungarian journalist and politician (born 1961)
- 2013 – Ya'akov Yosef, Israeli rabbi and politician (born 1946)
- 2014 – Pierre Autin-Grenier, French author and poet (born 1947)
- 2014 – Pierre-Henri Menthéour, French cyclist (born 1960)
- 2014 – Maurício Alves Peruchi, Brazilian footballer (born 1990)
- 2014 – Hal Smith, American baseball player and coach (born 1931)
- 2014 – Billy Standridge, American race car driver (born 1953)
- 2015 – Paulo Brossard, Brazilian jurist and politician (born 1924)
- 2015 – Patrice Dominguez, Algerian-French tennis player and trainer (born 1950)
- 2015 – Alfred Eick, German commander (born 1916)
- 2015 – André Mba Obame, Gabonese politician (born 1957)
- 2016 – Mohammad Al Gaz, Emirati politician & diplomat (born 1930)
- 2016 – Anne Jackson, American actress (born 1925)
- 2017 – Charlie Murphy, American actor and comedian (born 1959)
- 2020 – Tarvaris Jackson, American football player (born 1983)
- 2021 – Joseph Siravo, American actor and producer (born 1955)
- 2022 – Gilbert Gottfried, American comedian, actor, and singer (born 1955)
- 2024 – Roberto Cavalli, Italian fashion designer and inventor (born 1940)
- 2024 – Eleanor Coppola, American filmmaker (born 1936)
- 2024 – Robert MacNeil, Canadian-American journalist and author (born 1931)
- 2025 – Pilita Corrales, Filipino singer-songwriter and actress (born 1939)
- 2026 – Asha Bhosle, Indian playback singer, businesswoman, actress and television personality (born 1933)
- 2026 – Chris Payton-Jones American football player (born 1995)

== Holidays and observances ==
- Children's Day (Bolivia)
- Christian feast day:
  - Adoniram Judson (Episcopal Church)
  - Alferius
  - Blessed Angelo Carletti di Chivasso
  - Erkembode
  - Giuseppe Moscati
  - Pope Julius I
  - Sabbas the Goth
  - Teresa of the Andes
  - Zeno of Verona
  - April 12 (Eastern Orthodox liturgics)
- Commemoration of first human in space by Yuri Gagarin:
  - Cosmonautics Day (Russia)
  - International Day of Human Space Flight
  - Yuri's Night (International observance)
- Halifax Day (North Carolina)
- National Redemption Day (Liberia)
