= Życzkowski =

Życzkowski (feminine: Życzkowska, plural: Życzkowscy) is a Polish surname. Notable people with the surname include:

- Karol Życzkowski (born 1960), Polish mathematician and physicist
- Michał Życzkowski (1930–2006), Polish technical professor
