= Marcin Maciejowski =

Polish painter, drawer, and photographer (born 1974)

- Born: 14 June 1974 (age 52); Babice
- Education: Academy of Fine Arts in Kraków
- Known for: Painting, drawing
- Awards: Paszport Polityki (2002)

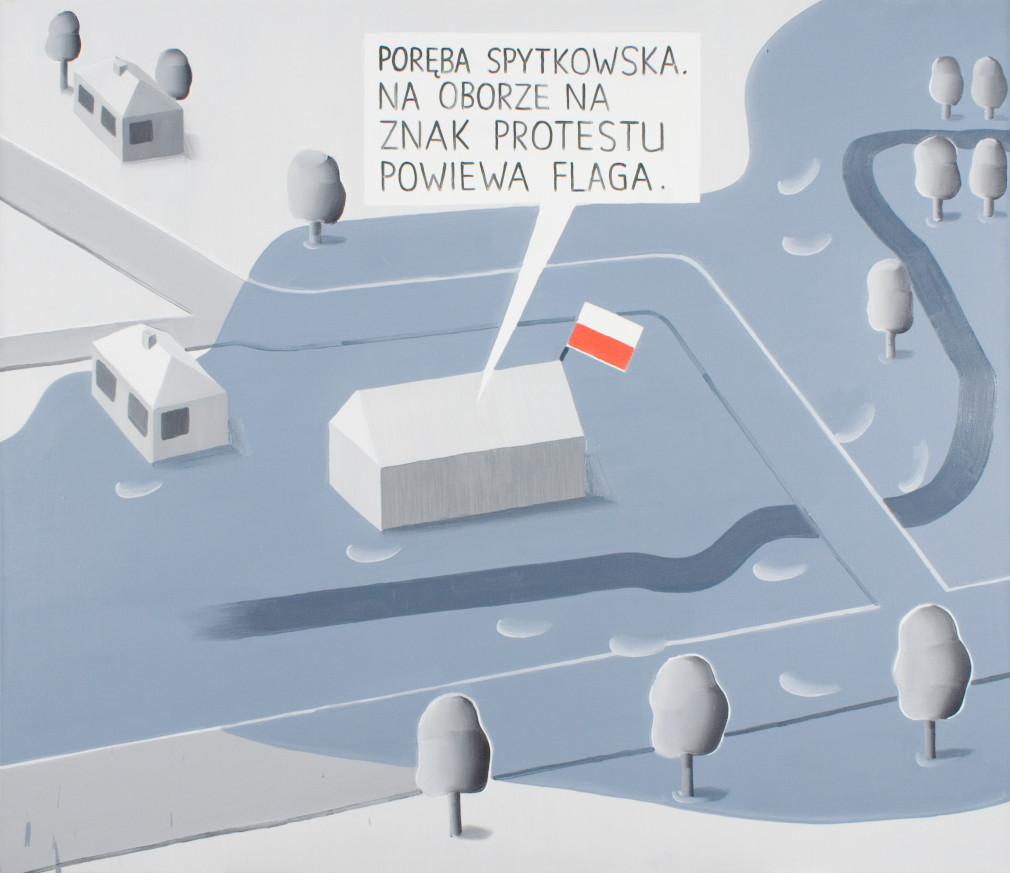
Poręba Spytkowska by Marcin Maciejowski

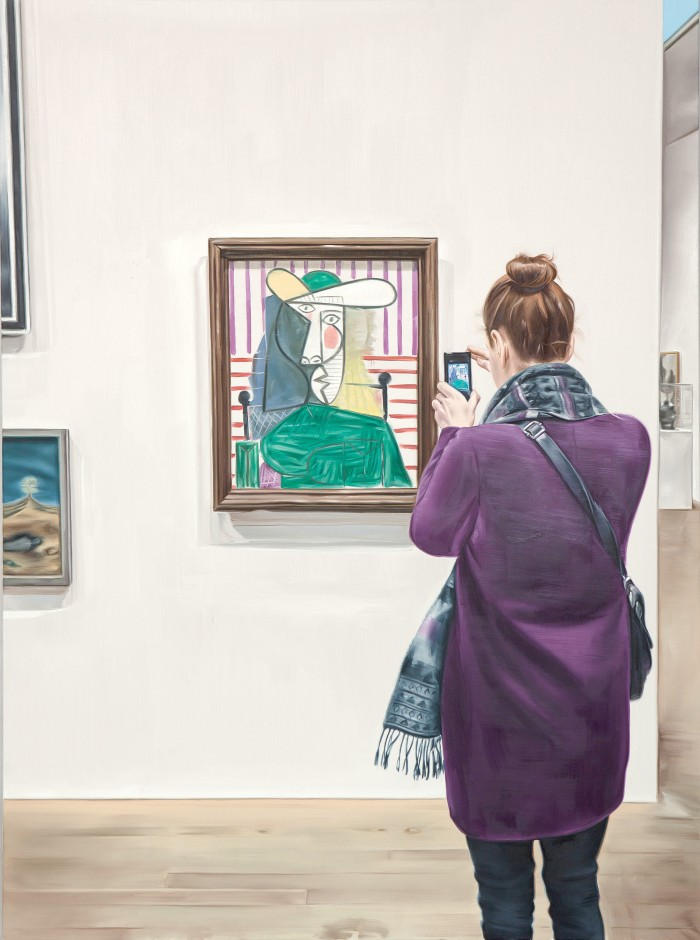
"Popiersie kobiety (1944) by Marcin Maciejowski

Marcin Maciejowski (born 14 June 1974) is a Polish painter and drawer who co-created, together with Wilhelm Sasnal, Rafał Bujnowski and Józef Tomczyk, the Ładnie group.

== Biography ==
He was born in Babice. He graduated from the Construction Technical School in Krzeszowice. He studied at the Faculty of Architecture of the Kraków University of Technology, but interrupted his studies after the third year and moved to the Faculty of Graphic Arts of the Kraków Academy of Fine Arts. There, in 2001 he obtained a diploma in the poster studio of Piotr Kunce.

He was active in the Ładnie group from 1996. In 1998 he founded and edited (together with Rafał Bujnowski) the artzine Słynne Pismo we Wtorek. His first exhibitions took place at the Galeria Otwarta (Open Gallery) ran by Rafał Bujnowski. In 1999 he exhibited his cycle of paintings Obrazy o dobru, miłości i kulturze at the Klub Kulturalny (Cultural Club) in Kraków.

According to Wacława Milewska, “the protagonists of his mocking images, often accompanied by verbal commentary, are stars of mass culture, politicians and representatives of youth subcultures.”

== Accolades ==
- Paszport Polityki in the field of visual arts (2002)
- Award in the Najpiękniejsze Książki Roku Competition for illustrations of the book Ale o co ci chodzi? by Marcin Świetlicki (2019)
- Kraków Book of the Month Award for the book Rysunki wawelskie (2025)

== Bibliography ==
- Maciejowski, Marcin (2001). Jan Michalski (ed.). POLSKA. Kraków. ISBN 83-87279-17-X.
- Maciejowski, Marcin (2007). Dieter Giesing, Goschka Gawlik/Christian Meyer (ed.). I Wanna Talk to You. Vienna. ISBN 978-3-86560-253-4.
- Drągowska, Magdalena; Kuryłek, Dominik; Tatar, Ewa Małgorzata (2008). Krótka historia Grupy Ładnie. Kraków: Korporacja Ha!art.
