= Rafał Bujnowski =

Polish painter, drawer, and photographer (born 1974)

- Born: 3 February 1974 (age 52); Wadowice
- Education: Academy of Fine Arts in Kraków
- Known for: Painting, photography, drawing
- Awards: Jan Cybis Award (2019)

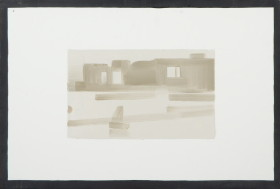
Obraz matki Whistlera by Rafał Bujnowski, from the collection of Zachęta National Gallery of Art

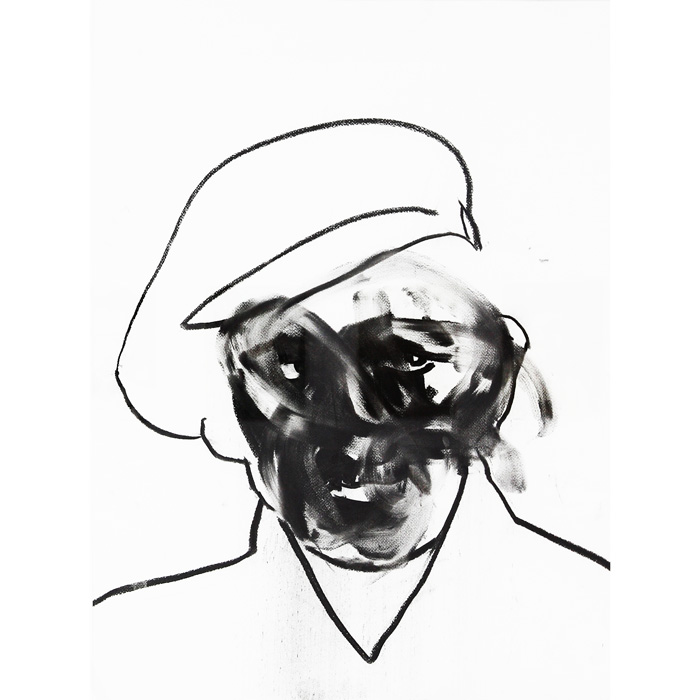
Górnik by Rafał Bujnowski, from the collection of Museum of Modern Art in Warsaw

Rafał Bujnowski (born 3 February 1974) is a Polish artist who works with painting and photography mediums. He has worked and collaborated with artists Wilhelm Sasnal, Marcin Maciejowski and Józef Tomczyk, the Ładnie group.

He was born in Wadowice, Poland. He studied at the Faculty of Architecture of the Kraków University of Technology (1993–1995) and at the Faculty of Graphic Arts of the Kraków Academy of Fine Arts (1995–2000). His painting cycles included Zmierzch (2004), Lamp Black (2007) and Nokturn (2014).

== Accolades ==
- Europas Zukunft Award (2005)
- Jan Cybis Award (2019)

== Bibliography ==
- Bujnowski R., Krajewski M., Küper S., Potocka M.A. (2005). A. Smolak (ed.). Rafał Bujnowski. Malen / painting / malowanie. Translated by M. Brand. Kraków: Galeria Sztuki Współczesnej Bunkier Sztuki. ISBN 83-86905-64-6.
- Drągowska, Magdalena; Kuryłek, Dominik; Tatar, Ewa Małgorzata (2008). Krótka historia Grupy Ładnie. Kraków: Korporacja Ha!art.
- Łukasz Gorczyca, ed. (2013). Rafał Bujnowski. Polityka obrazów. Wybrane prace z lat 1999–2013. Warszawa. ISBN 978-83-938244-7-2.
- Drągowska, M. (2017). "Historia Grupy Ładnie (Sasnal, Bujnowski, Maciejowski)". Artyści z Krakowa. Generacja 1970-1979. Kraków: MOCAK. pp. 8–33. ISBN 978-83-65851-06-2.
