= Ranalli =

Ranalli is an Italian surname. Notable people with the surname include:

- Cristian Ranalli, (born 1979) Italian footballer
- George Ranalli (born 1946), American architect, scholar, and curator
