= Zachęta – National Gallery of Art =

- Zachęta – Narodowa Galeria Sztuki

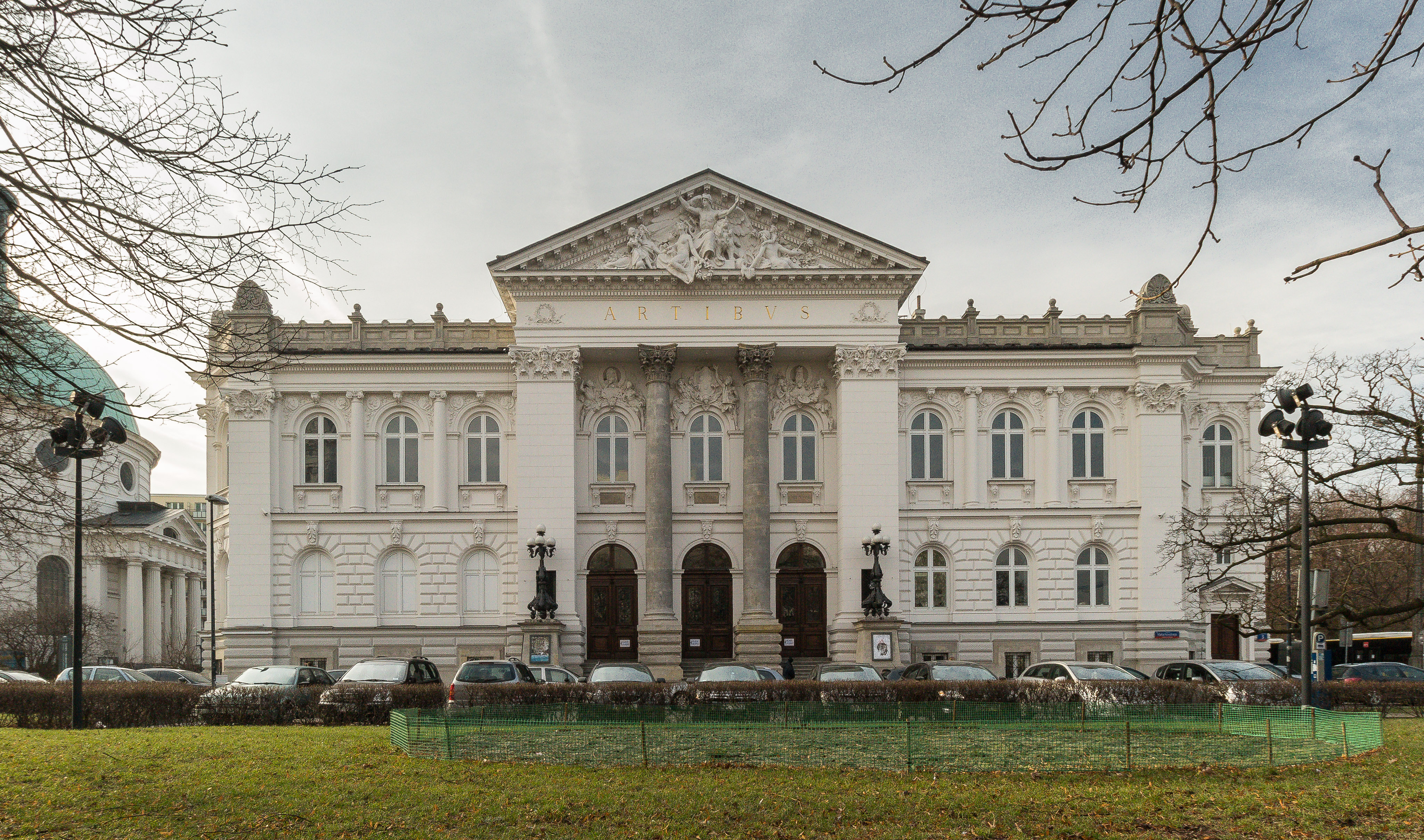
- Established: 13 December 1860
- Location: Warsaw, Poland
- Coordinates: 52°14′21″N 21°0′42″E
- Type: Contemporary art museum
- Director: Agnieszka Pindera
- Public transit access: Swietokrzyska
- Website: www.zacheta.art.pl

The Zachęta – National Gallery of Art (Polish: Zachęta – Narodowa Galeria Sztuki) is a contemporary art museum in the center of Warsaw, Poland. The Gallery's chief purpose is to present and support Polish contemporary art and artists. With numerous temporary exhibitions of well-known foreign artists, the gallery has also established itself internationally.

The word "zachęta" means encouragement. The Zachęta Gallery takes its name from Towarzystwo Zachęty do Sztuk Pięknych (Society for the Encouragement of the Fine Arts), founded in Warsaw in 1860.

== History ==
=== Society for the Encouragement of Fine Arts ===
Before 1860 there were neither public museums nor libraries nor other generally accessible institutions that allowed for exchange between artists. The repression that resulted from the November Uprising, made higher artistic education virtually impossible. The last major exhibition took place in 1845. After protests by artists during the 1850s, the Wystawa Krajowa Sztuk Pięknych (National Exhibition of Fine Arts) was approved in 1858, and lead to negotiations with Russian rulers who in the end permitted the foundation of the Society for the Encouragement of Fine Arts in 1860. The Society's statutes were set by artists and art experts. The first official meeting and the election of a board of directors took place on 13 December 1860. The board had twelve members, six artists and six art experts, and was elected annually. The members remained in office for at least one month but no longer than one year.

The primary aim of the Society was the dissemination of fine arts as well as support and encouragement of artists. Furthermore, its intention was to create general awareness of art among the Polish society. In 1860 the Society had 234 official registered members. Only one year later the number had increased to 1464.

Initially, all artworks were on display until they were sold. Soon enough that lead to crowded walls and a monotonous permanent exhibition. After fundamental changes made between 1900 and 1939, the permanent exhibition was shown only in addition to temporarily changing exhibitions.

The Society hosted annual salons, funded scholarships and offered other aid to young artists, both members and candidates.

=== The building ===
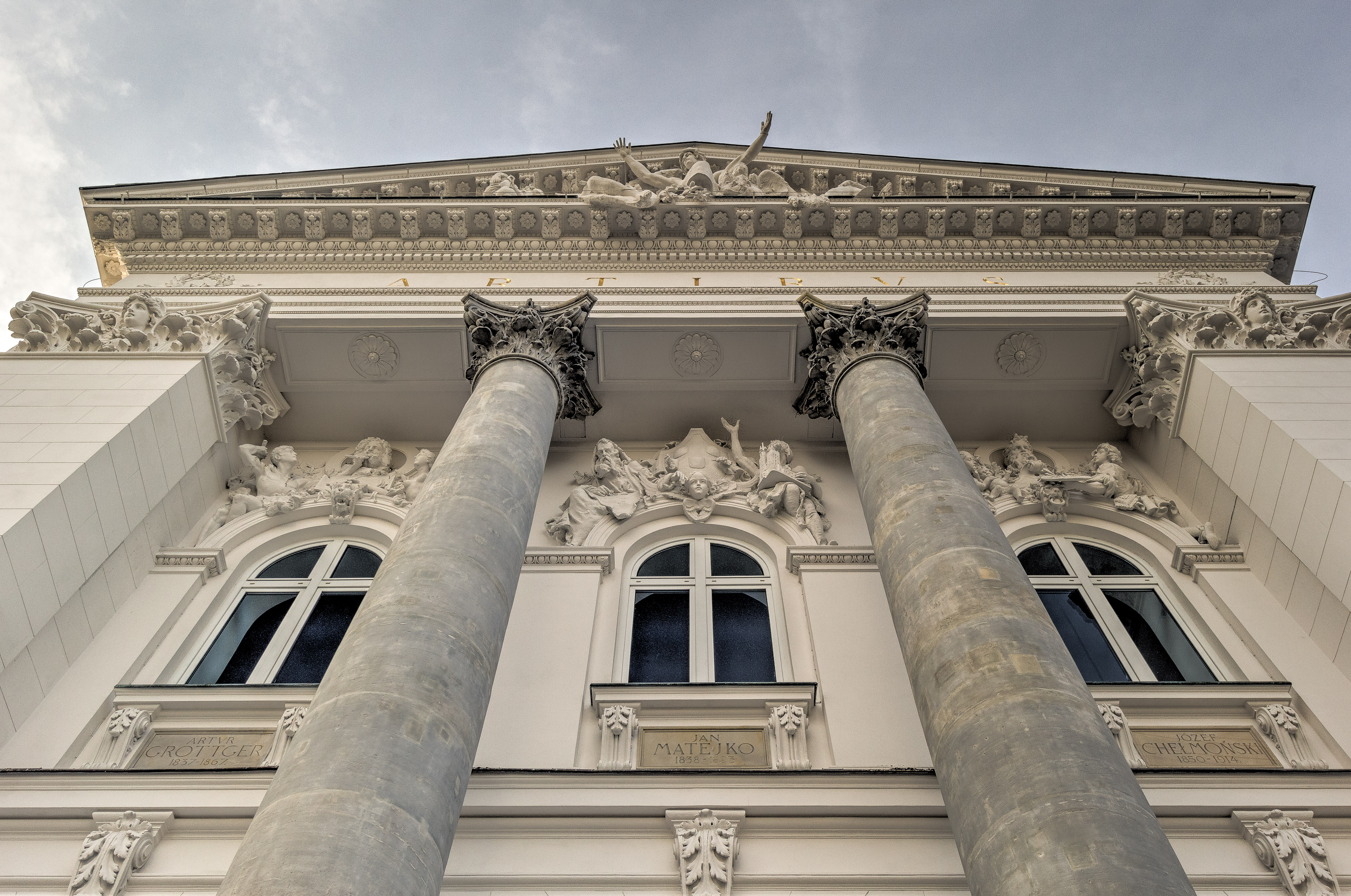
Architectural details of the building

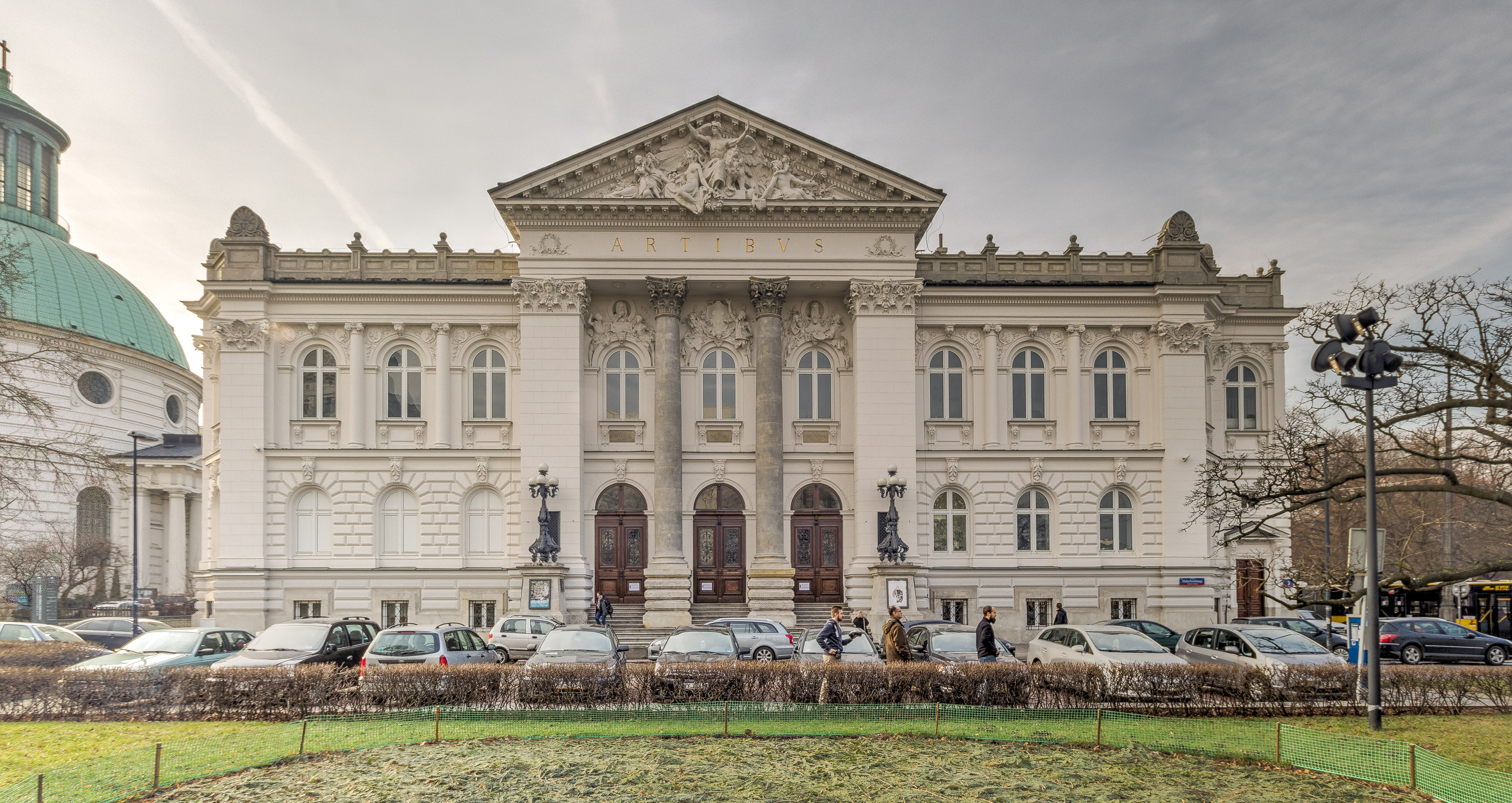
Zachęta Gallery, front view

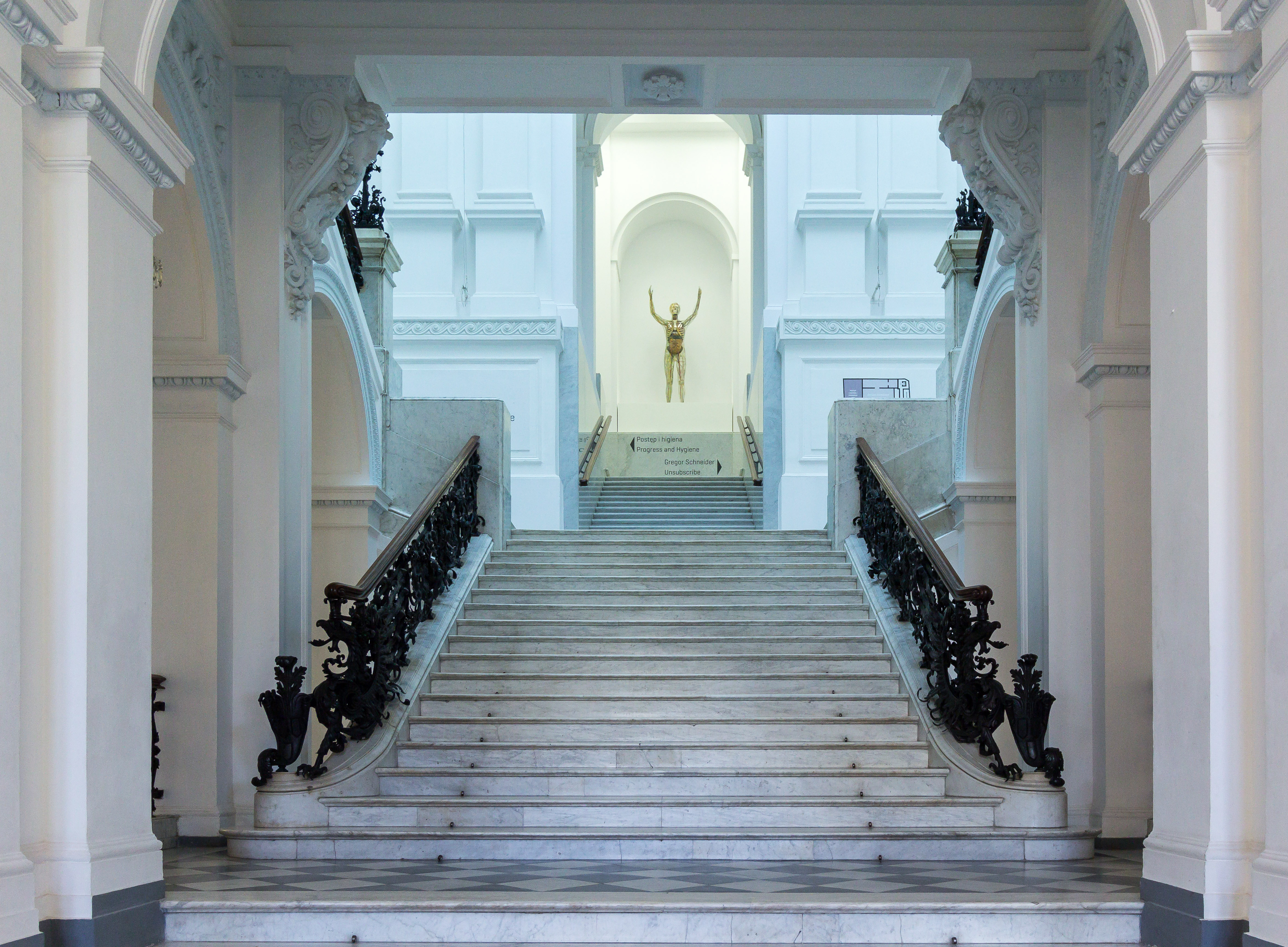
Zachęta - main hall and staircase

First tenders for the design of a new building were put out in 1862. However, due to a lack of financial resources the plans were not realized. After the Society was given land by the municipality, another competition was announced in 1894, won by the Warsaw architect, Stefan Szyller. He presented an architectural design in neo-Renaissance style with classical elements. The portal is ornamented with allegorical figures and sculptural works by Zygmunt Otto. The architrave of the building is engraved with the Latin word Artibus.

Construction work began in 1898. In December 1900, the front building was officially opened followed by the opening of the south wing in 1903. Both the opening and extension of the building were exceptionally well reviewed. Szyller's plans originally included the construction of two more wings which could not be implemented at that time.

In 1958, the Ministry of Art and Culture decided to reconstruct the building. Surrounding houses had been destroyed during the war and thus, involuntarily, gave way to the extension of the building. The Warsaw architects, Oskar Hansen, Lech Tomaszewski and Stanisław Zamecznikow, were entrusted with the reconstruction, but the planned reconstruction was postponed.

In 1982, the reconstruction plans were taken up again and executed by the Shop for Preservation of Monuments. From 1991 to 1993, the reconstruction was supervised and executed by the company, Dom i Miasto (Home and City). The company was also responsible for the extension of the staircases inside the building, which allowed for direct access to the exhibition halls within the new part of the building. The resulting monumental perspective is emphasized by the Gladiator, a work by the Polish sculptor, Pius Weloński, which remained from the Society's former collection.

The extension of the building created a larger exhibition space, a storage facility for the artwork, an unloading platform and an office wing with a separate entrance. The largest exhibition hall was named after the Polish painter, Jan Matejko. Another room is named after Gabriel Narutowicz, the first president of the Second Polish Republic, who was assassinated at Zachęta on 16 December 1922 by Eligiusz Niewiadomski, a Polish painter and critic. To commemorate the president and Wojciech Gerson, one of the founders of the Society for the Encouragement of Fine Arts, two plaques were revealed during the gallery's anniversary celebrations in 2000.

Since its official opening in 1900, the Zachęta building has housed several institutions:

- 1900–1939: Society for the Encouragement of Fine Arts
- 1939–1945: House of German Culture
- 1945–1989: Central Bureau for Art Exhibitions
- 1989–2003: Zachęta State Gallery of Art
- since 2003: Zachęta National Gallery of Art

The Zachęta building was registered as a historical monument in 1965.

=== 1939 to 1945 ===
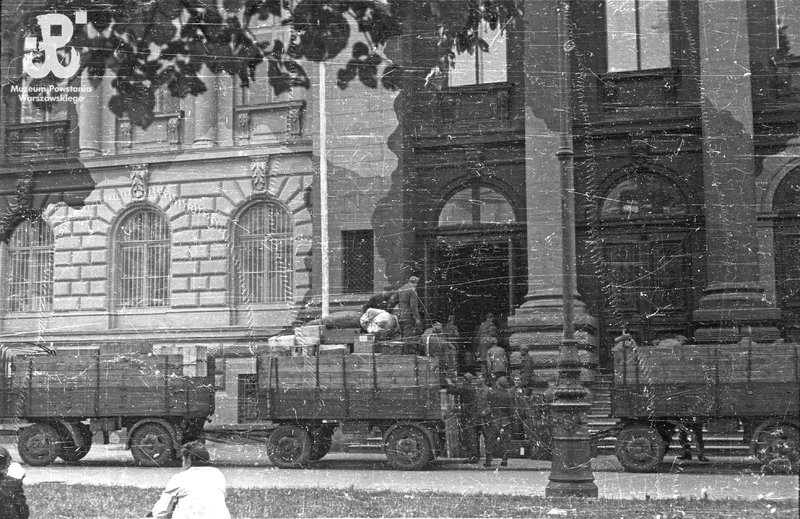
Zachęta looted by the Germans in July 1944

During the Invasion of Poland at the beginning of the Second World War almost all of the buildings surrounding the museum were destroyed while the Zachęta building remained comparatively undamaged. Following the Polish capitulation, German units occupied the building and converted it into the Haus der Deutschen Kultur (House of German Culture) which was mainly used for propaganda purposes. The Society for the Encouragement of Fine Arts was dissolved. The artwork, as well as other documents belonging to the Society, were largely brought to the Muzeum Narodowe, or confiscated and sent to Germany. The transport took place on open trucks without any proper documentation. During the Warsaw Uprising the Zachęta building was heavily damaged by artillery and bombs and thus needed to be fully renovated at the end of the war. Traces of a flammable substance were found, suggesting that German units planned to set the building on fire before their withdrawal.

=== 1945 to 1989 ===
After the war, the Society for the Encouragement of Fine Arts was not reactivated. It was replaced by the Centralne Biuro Wystaw Artystycznych (Central Bureau for Art Exhibitions) which was founded in 1949 by the Ministry for Art and Culture at the request of the Association for Fine Arts, Poland. In 1951, the bureau began to host exhibitions. The first director (1949–1954) was Armand Vetulani.

The central bureau was responsible for the organisation of art exhibitions, and all other artistic activity, throughout the entire country. Branch offices were opened in Kraków, Katowice, Poznań, Łódź, Zakopane, Gdańsk, Szczecin, Wrocław, Olsztyn and Opole. Eventually, the Central Bureau for Art Exhibitions became the most important institution in the area of cultural policy.

The 1980s were characterized by radical political changes related to the declaration of martial law, leading to a boycott of all official galleries. In fact, the central bureau never really recovered from these drastic failures.

=== After 1989 ===
The fall of the Berlin Wall and the fall of the Iron Curtain changed political circumstances fundamentally, and also affected the structure of the central bureau. Barbara Majewska, the director of the bureau, moved the bureau away from its former old and centralistic structures, and on May 30, 1994, the Central Bureau for Art Exhibitions was closed and turned into the Zachęta State Gallery.

In 2003, the Polish minister of culture, Waldemar Dąbrowski, renamed the gallery Narodowa Galeria Sztuki (National Gallery of Art).

== Exhibitions ==
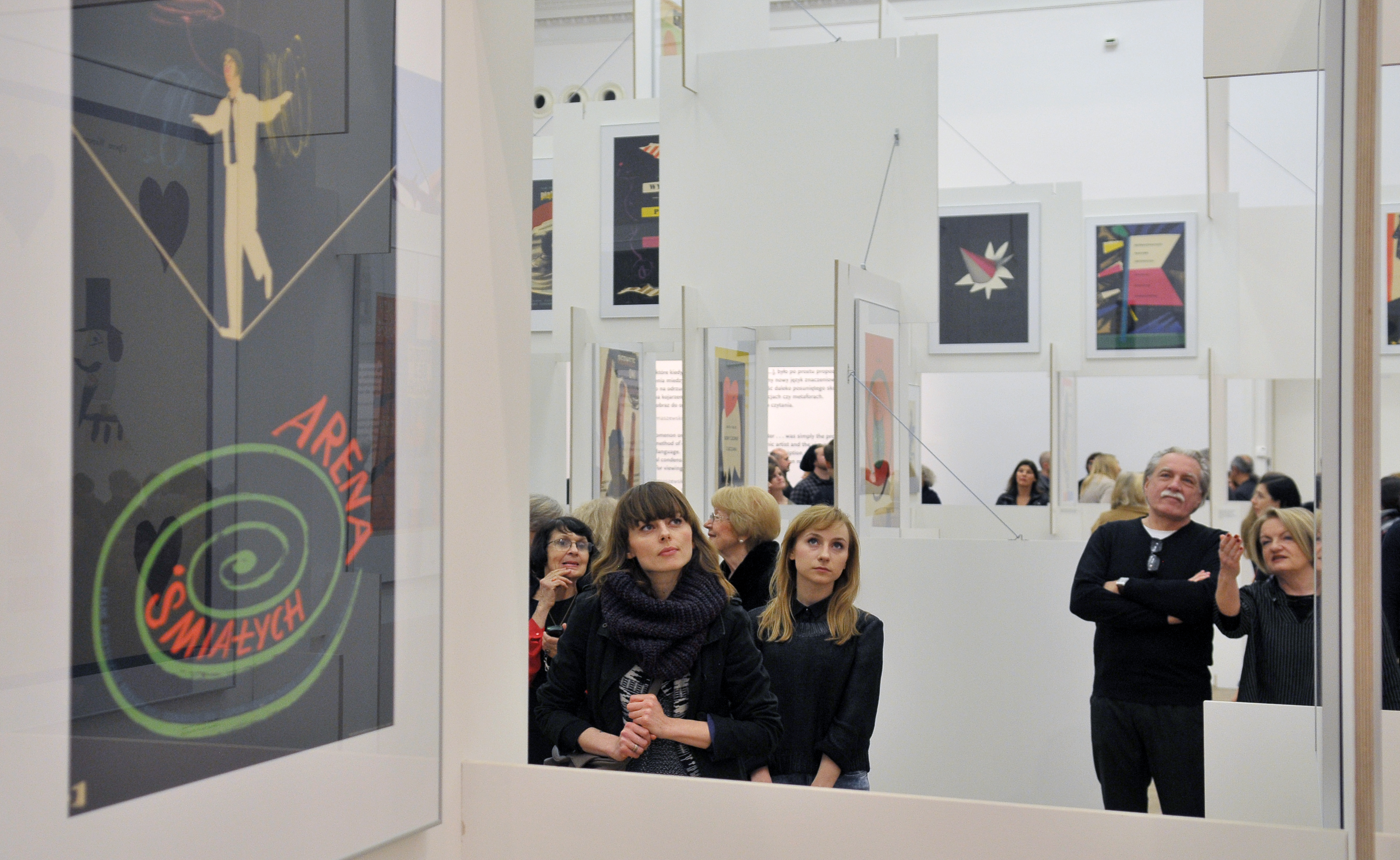
Monographic exhibition of Henryk Tomaszewski, Zachęta Gallery, 2014

In 2000, the gallery marked its 100th anniversary with the exhibition, Polonia - Polonia. The exhibition included over 100 objects from different times and representing different types of media. All of the artwork presented national subjects.

In the same year, the gallery opened the exhibition Słońce i inne Gwiazdy (The Sun and other Stars) based on a survey taken in 1999. The survey was directed primarily to Polish art historians, critics and curators, and asked for the most important artists of the 20th century. The result was two lists: one presenting the most important Polish artists and the other presenting the most important foreign artists. Słońce i inne Gwiazdy exhibited ten of the elected Polish artists: Magdalena Abakanowicz, Tadeusz Kantor, Katarzyna Kobro, Roman Opałka, Henryk Stażewski, Władysław Strzemiński, Alina Szapocznikow, Witkacy, Witold Wojtkiewicz and Andrzej Wróblewski.

Also in 2000, the ten most important foreign artists were presented in another exhibit and consisted of Pablo Picasso, Francis Bacon, Joseph Beuys, Marcel Duchamp, Wassily Kandinsky, Andy Warhol, Kazimir Malevich, Salvador Dalí, Piet Mondrian and Constantin Brâncuși.

In 2000, the Swiss art historian, Harald Szeemann, curated an exhibition featuring Maurizio Cattelans, La Nona Ora (The ninth Hour). The artwork shows Pope John Paul II hit and buried by a meteor. As the influence of the Catholic Church in Poland still is very strong, the presentation of Cattelan's work led to a public scandal.

== Permanent collection ==
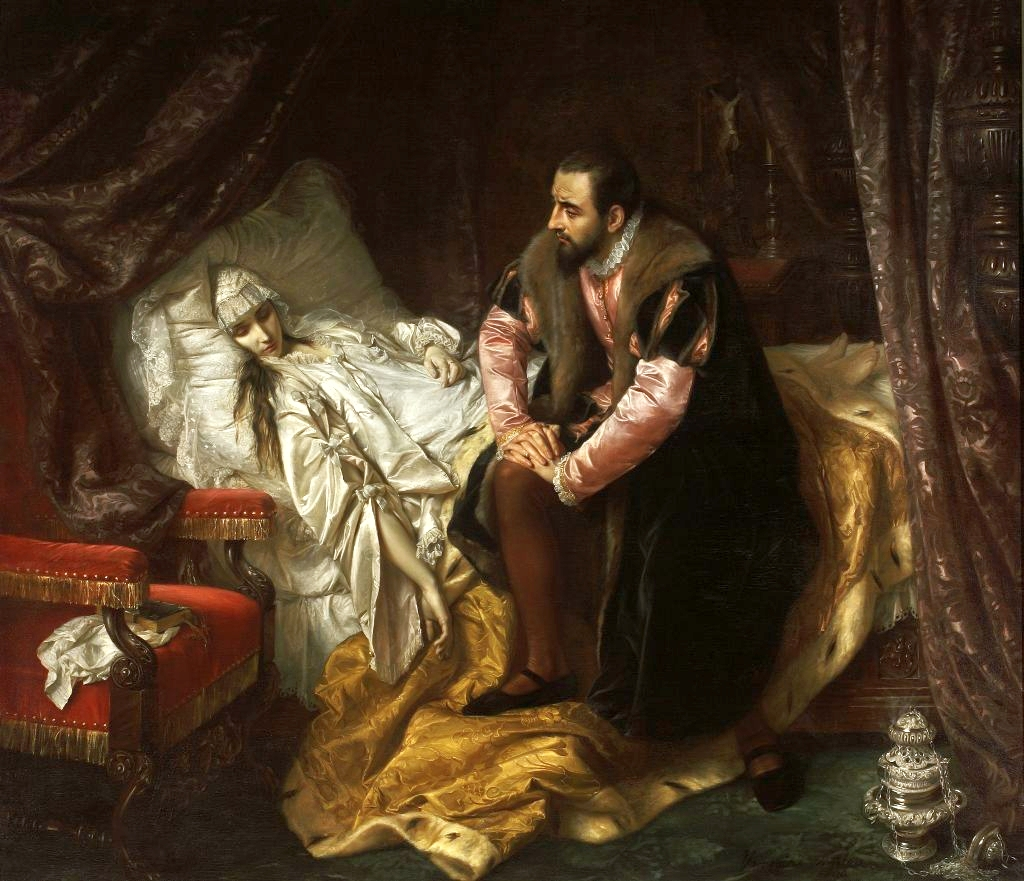
Death of Barbara Radziwiłł. a painting by Józef Simmler.

The collection began with a picture of Józef Simmler's Death of Barbara Radziwiłł. Objects have come mainly from donations and wills. At the end of the 19th century, the collection already comprised over one thousand items.

The permanent collection of Zachęta National Gallery of Art today comprises 3600 objects of which about 700 are paintings, almost 80 are video works and around 100 are sculptures and installations. In addition, the gallery owns an extensive collection of over 2600 works on paper such as graphic works, drawings and photographs. Polish artists from the 20th century, like Tadeusz Kantor, Henryk Stażewski and Alina Szapocznikow, are represented within the collection as well as Polish contemporary artists such as Mirosław Bałka, Katarzyna Kozyra, Zbigniew Libera, Wilhelm Sasnal and Krzysztof Wodiczko.

The works of the collection not only reflect the often complicated past of the institution, but also show the focus of the gallery. Today, it concentrates on works of contemporary Polish artists, including works that have been shown in the gallery as well as works which were produced in cooperation with the gallery. Some of these projects are exhibited in other locations, such as the Polish Pavilion at the Biennale in Venice. There is no permanent exhibition of the collection. The works either become integrated in temporary shows or are on loan for exhibitions in other Polish institutions or abroad.

Decisions about changes to the collection are made by the Commission for Purchases, Donations and Deposits, formed in 1990. Since 2008, the Department of Collections and Inventories is responsible for taking care of Zachęta's collection.

=== Gallery ===
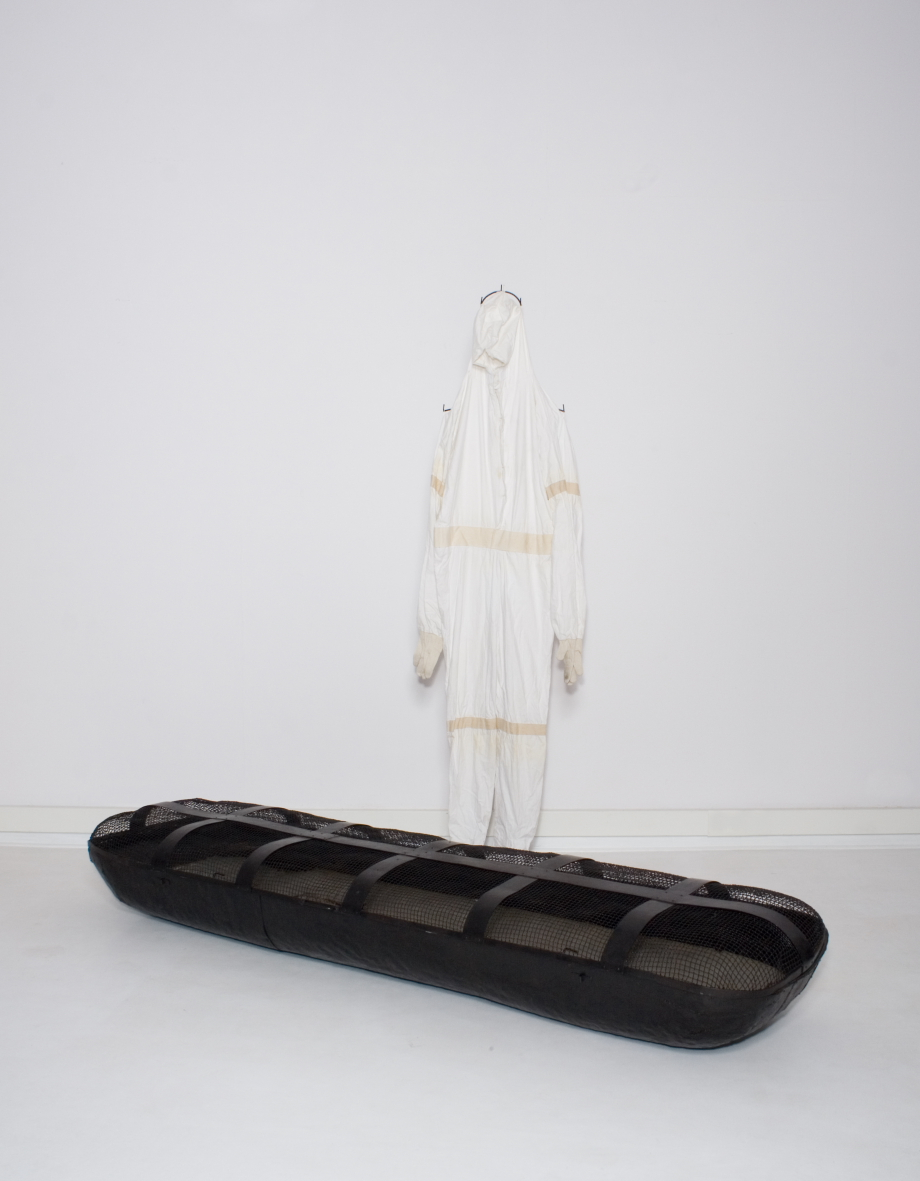
Paweł Althamer A Boat and a Space Suit

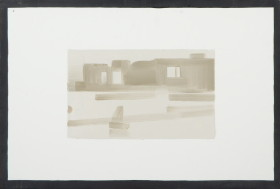
Rafał Bujnowski Matka Whistlera

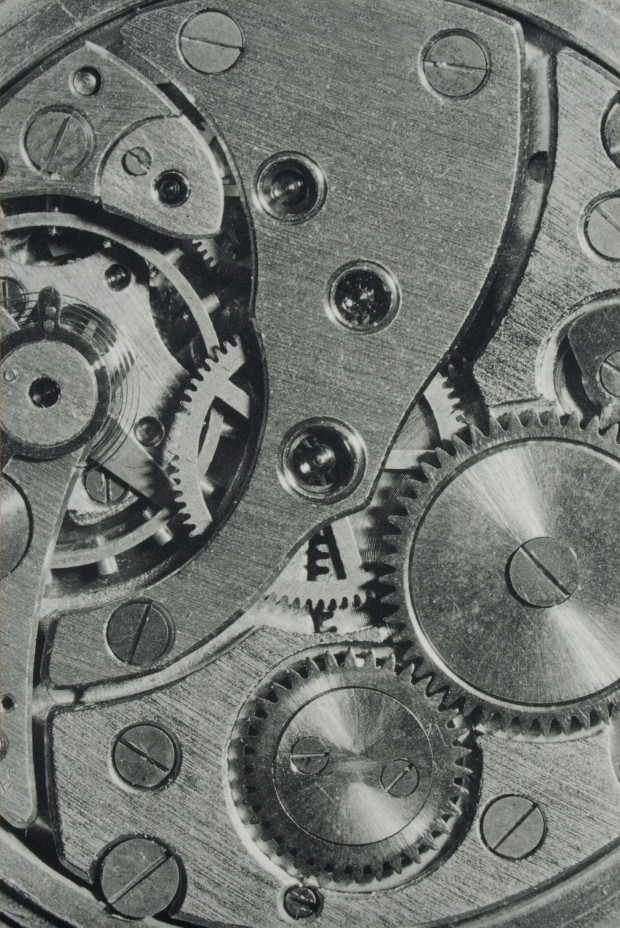
Zbigniew Dłubak Teaching Board I /1-4/

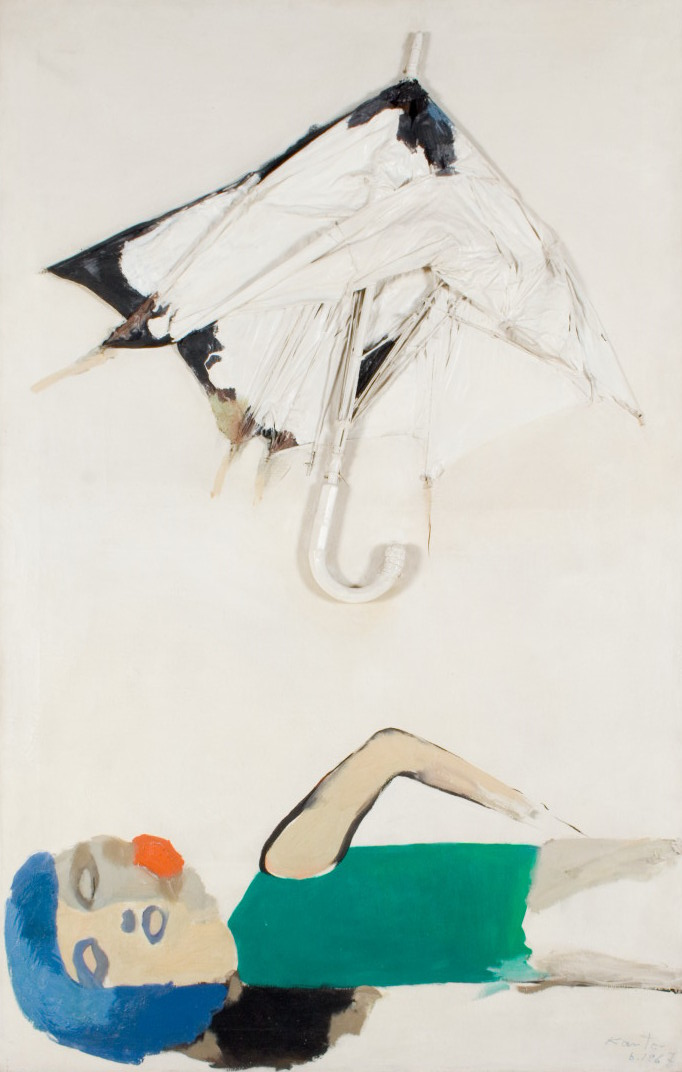
Tadeusz Kantor Umbrella and Woman

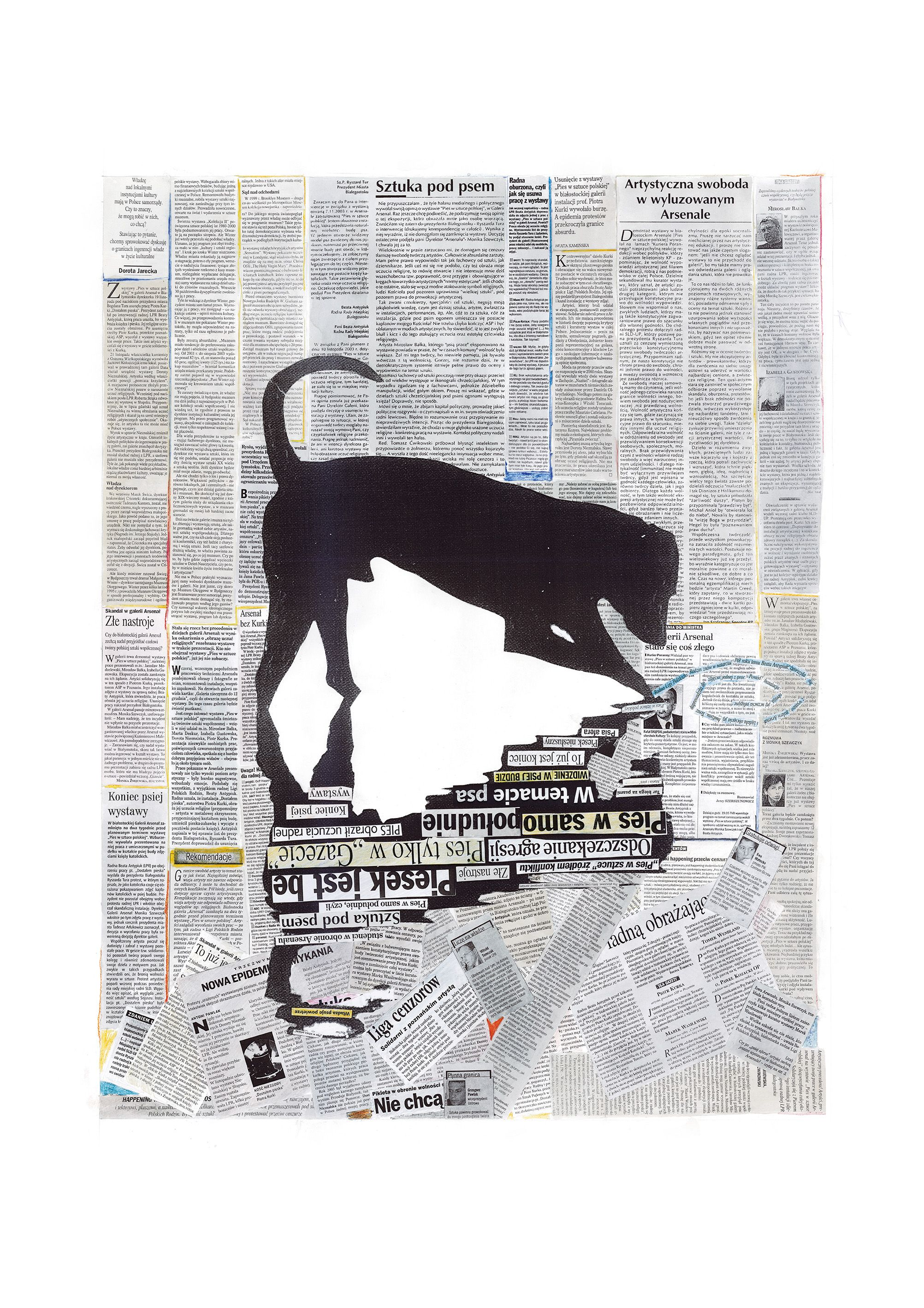
Goshka Macuga The Dog (Pies)

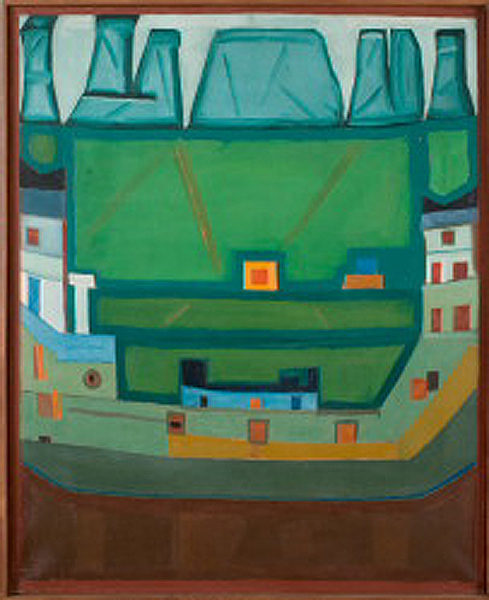
Jerzy Nowosielski City at the Foot of the Mountains (Landscape)

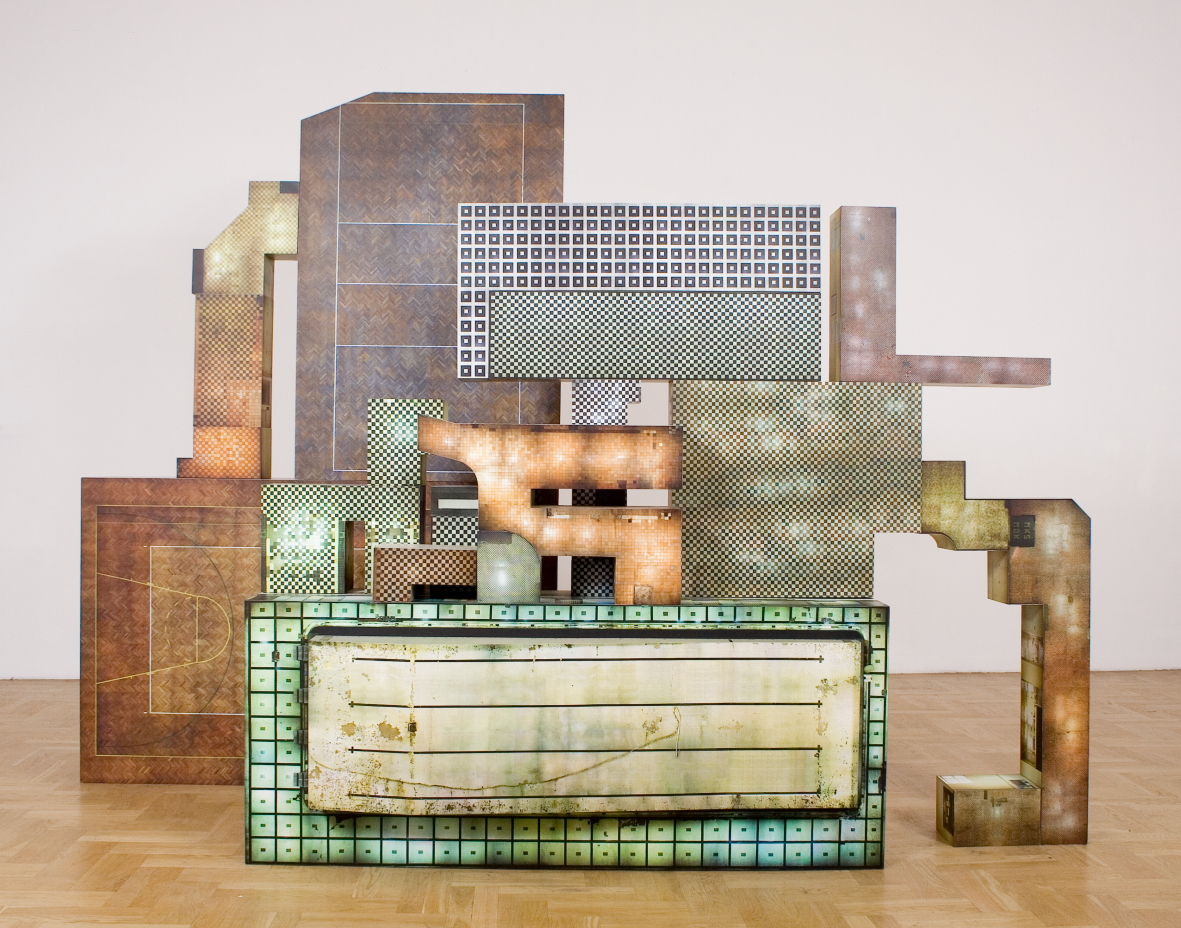
Aneta Grzeszykowska "YMCA"

== Library ==
The Zachęta library includes:

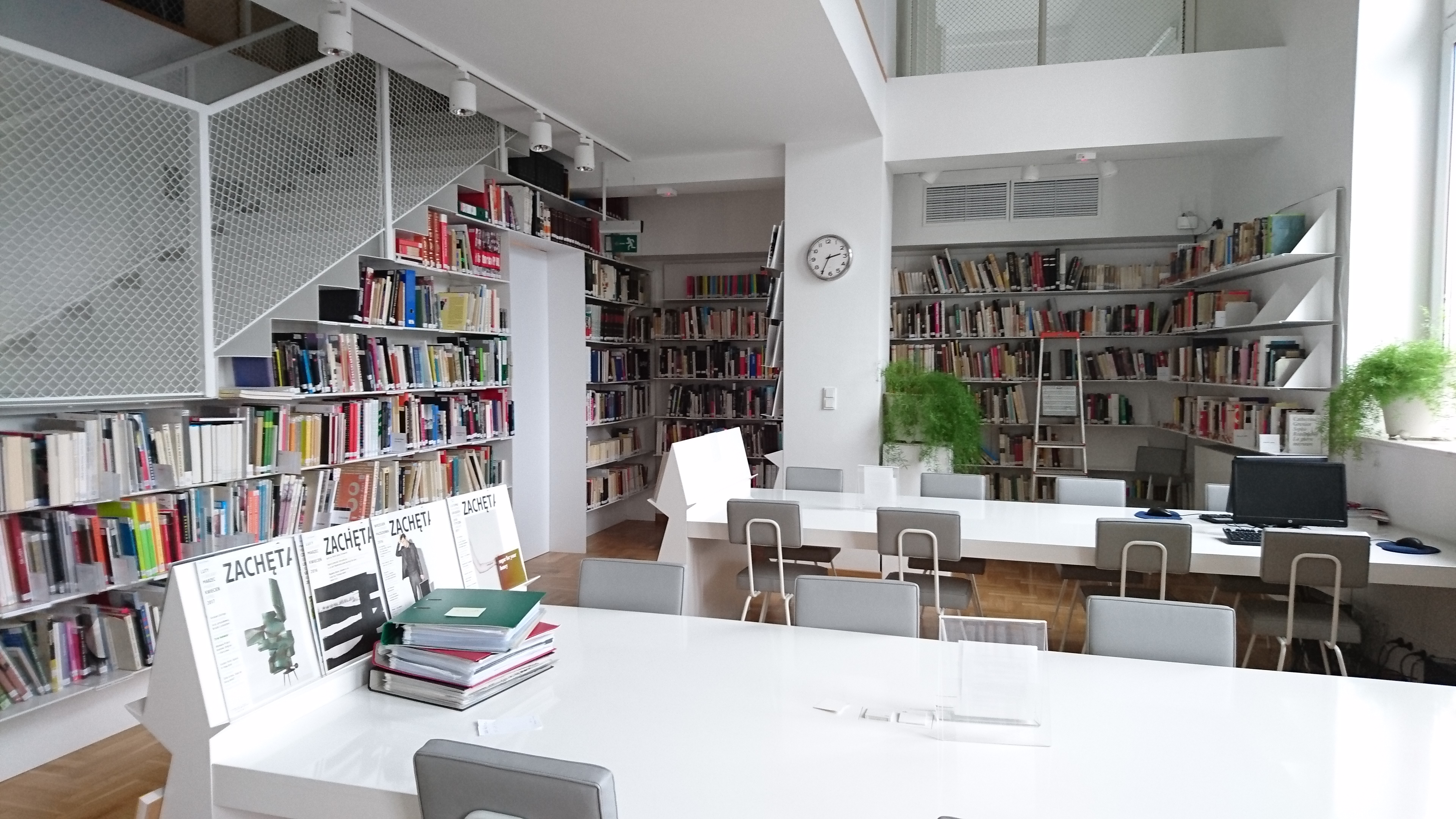
Zachęta library

- Catalogues about Polish artists who are working in Poland and abroad, about foreign artists who are working in Poland, as well as catalogues about certain cycles of exhibitions. The catalogue collection is one of the most extensive in Poland.
- Books about contemporary art and related subjects.
- Magazines: Polish as well as foreign magazines about art in general.

The Department for Documentation archives the lives and works of Polish artists since 1945. In addition to biographical notes, there is a list of exhibitions the respective artists took part in as well as newspaper clippings and exhibition catalogues. The archive is accessible and can only be used on-site.

The gallery's bookshop is located on the ground floor of the building, offering catalogues, books and magazines of Polish and foreign artists as well as catalogues of exhibitions which took place at both the Zachęta and Kordegarda.

The gallery also runs a separate Pedagogy Department which is responsible for the organisation of lectures, meetings and talks with artists and art historians, concerts, guided tours as well as educational programmes.

== Project Kordegarda ==
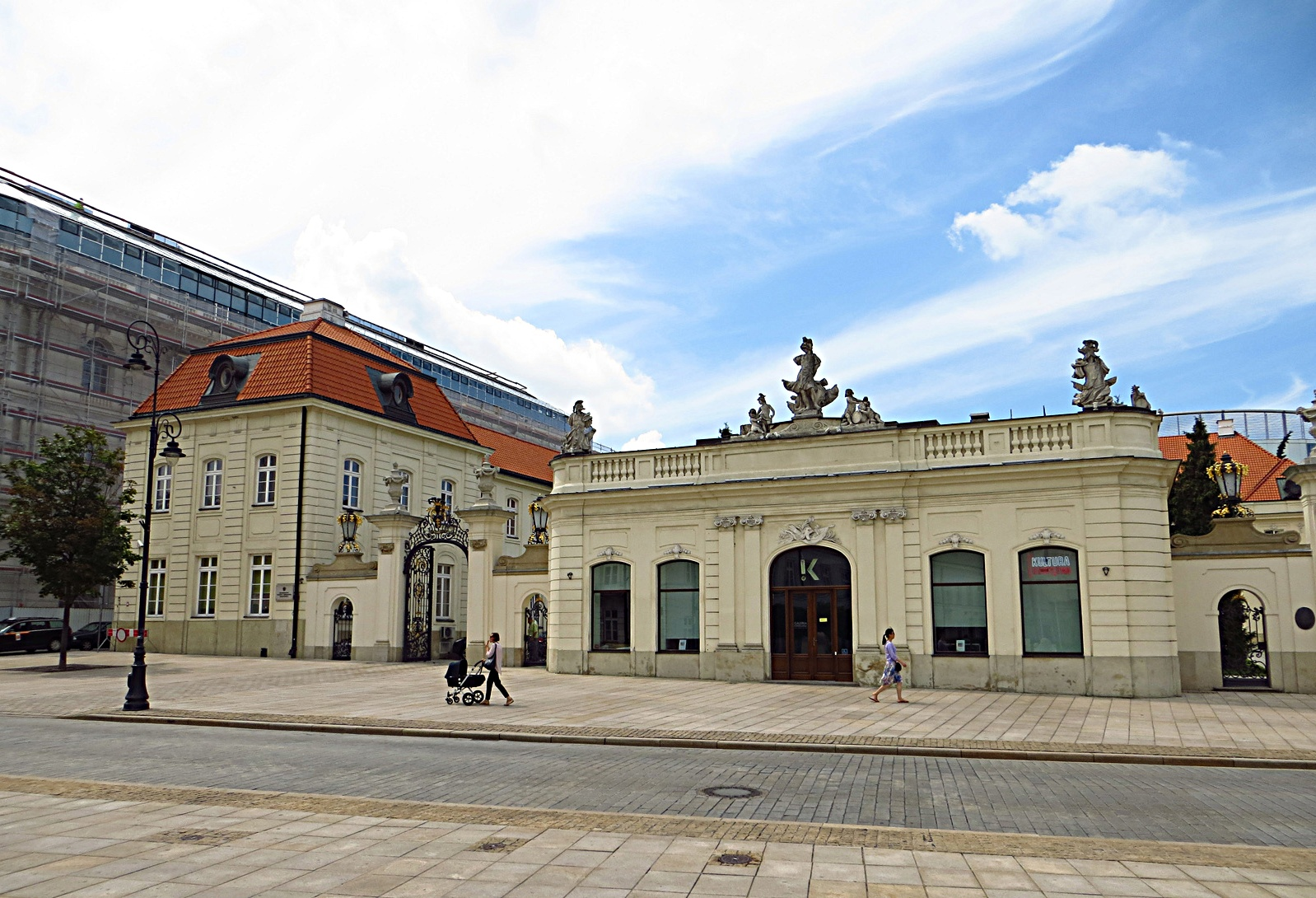
Kordegarda Gallery

The Kordegarda Gallery (literally: guardroom) was founded in 1956 as a branch of the Zachęta and situated on Krakowskie Przedmieście in Warsaw. It was an additional exhibition space, directed and organised by Zachęta, yet to a certain extent independent with regard to its exhibition programme.

In 2010, the Kordegarda Gallery moved to Gałczynskiego street, just off the historic Ulica Nowy Świat (New World Street). While still directed by the Zachęta, the Kordegarda Gallery became more independent, devoting its attention to young artists, both Polish and foreign. The main idea is to present the artists within the context of urban structures and emphasize the cooperation of artist and gallery. In fact, the exhibition room is just as important as the art within, which is why every artist is asked to work individually with the exhibition room and design the artwork, especially for the given space.

Currently, the Zachęta is updating both the concept and programme of the Kordegarda Gallery.

== Controversies ==
In the past, the influence of the catholic church in Poland was demonstrated by the censoring of various exhibitions due to blasphemy. In December 2000, the Polish right-wing politician Witold Tomczak damaged Maurizio Cattelan's sculpture, La Nona Ora, and prompted the dismissal of director, Anda Rottenberg. In a letter addressed to the prime minister, Tomczak denounced Rottenberg, suggested that she should curate "rather in Israel than in Poland", and then demanded the dismissal of the "civil servant of Jewish origin". He also proposed prosecution due to violation of religious sentiments.

== See also ==
- List of national galleries
