= Geometry of Quantum States =

2006 book by Ingemar Bengtsson and Karol Życzkowski

Geometry of Quantum States: An Introduction to Quantum Entanglement
- Author: Ingemar Bengtsson and Karol Życzkowski
- Language: English
- Genre: Nonfiction
- Publisher: Cambridge University Press
- Publication date: 2006 (first edition); 2017 (second edition)
- ISBN: 978-0-521-81451-5

Geometry of Quantum States: An Introduction to Quantum Entanglement is a book by Ingemar Bengtsson and Karol Życzkowski about the mathematics used in quantum physics. The first edition was published in 2006 and the second in 2017.

== Contents ==
The text begins by introducing the idea of convex sets, using color theory. It then discusses classical probability theory from a geometric perspective and develops the concept of complex projective space, after which it outlines the mathematical fundamentals of quantum mechanics. The following chapters then go into detail about topics within quantum theory, including coherent states, density matrices, aspects of quantum channels, distinguishability measures for quantum states, and von Neumann entropy.

The second edition added a chapter about discrete structures in finite-dimensional Hilbert spaces. This chapter covers topics related to mutually unbiased bases and the special quantum measurements known as SIC-POVMs.

== Reception ==
The text received generally positive reviews. Miłosz Michalski called the first edition "indispensable" for readers interested in the mathematics of quantum information, praising its writing style, use of illustrations, choice of exercises, and extensive collection of references. D. W. Hook also appreciated the illustrations, and singled out the authors' treatment of quantum measurements as particularly clear. Hook found the volume to be less a textbook and more a collection of largely self-contained essays. Reviewing the book for MathSciNet, Paul B. Slater found it "a markedly distinctive, dedicatedly pedagogical, suitably rigorous text".

Gerard J. Milburn called the book "a delight to read and to savour". Its explanation of the Fubini–Study and Bures metrics were the best that he had encountered to date. Milburn opined that readers who wanted a quick introduction to entanglement would benefit more from a shorter book, but those with the time to devote to the topic should "hang a gone fishin' notice on your office door" and read Bengtsson and Życzkowski.

== Editions ==
- Bengtsson, Ingemar; Życzkowski, Karol (2006). Geometry of Quantum States: An Introduction to Quantum Entanglement (1st ed.). Cambridge University Press. ISBN 978-0-521-81451-5. MR 2230995.
- Bengtsson, Ingemar; Życzkowski, Karol (2017). Geometry of Quantum States: An Introduction to Quantum Entanglement (2nd ed.). Cambridge University Press. ISBN 978-1-107-02625-4.

== See also ==
- Mathematical formulation of quantum mechanics
