= Wilhelm Sasnal =

Polish painter (born 1972)

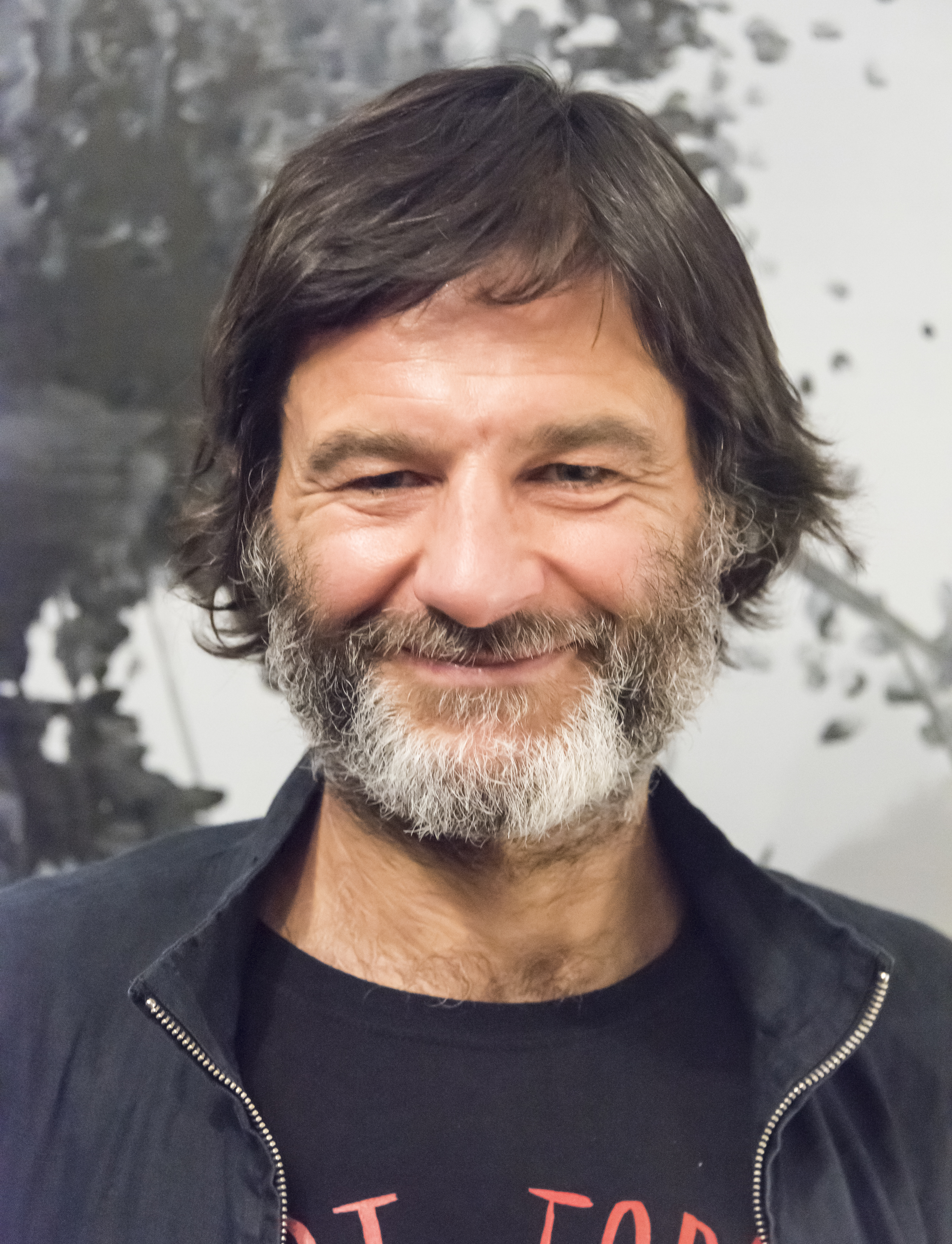
- Wilhelm Sasnal, 2022
- Born: 1972 (age 53–54); Tarnów, Poland
- Education: Academy of Fine Arts in Kraków
- Known for: Painting, photography, poster art, film
- Awards: Paszport Polityki (2022); Order of Polonia Restituta (2014); Vincent Award (2006)

Wilhelm Sasnal (born 1972) is a Polish painter, photographer, poster artist, illustrator and filmmaker. Sasnal graduated in painting from the Academy of Fine Arts in Kraków in 1999. He is considered one of the most prominent and internationally successful Polish contemporary artists.

== Early life and career ==
Wilhelm Sasnal was born in Tarnów, Poland, in 1972. He studied architecture for two years at the Tadeusz Kościuszko University of Technology in Kraków, beginning in 1992, and then became a painting student at the Academy of Fine Arts in Kraków, Poland. While there, he helped form an artist's collective that exhibited together as the Ładnie Group (together with Rafał Bujnowski, Marcin Maciejowski and Józef Tomczyk) until 2000. Named after the Polish word meaning "pretty" or "nice," the members made paintings of their contemporary, often banal surroundings, using a deskilled aesthetic that countered the style valued by their instructors. Sasnal finished his studies in 1999, and then worked briefly for advertising companies in Kraków while also making paintings, graphic novels (his strips are regularly published in Machina and Przekroj, two Polish periodicals), photographs, and films.

== Work ==
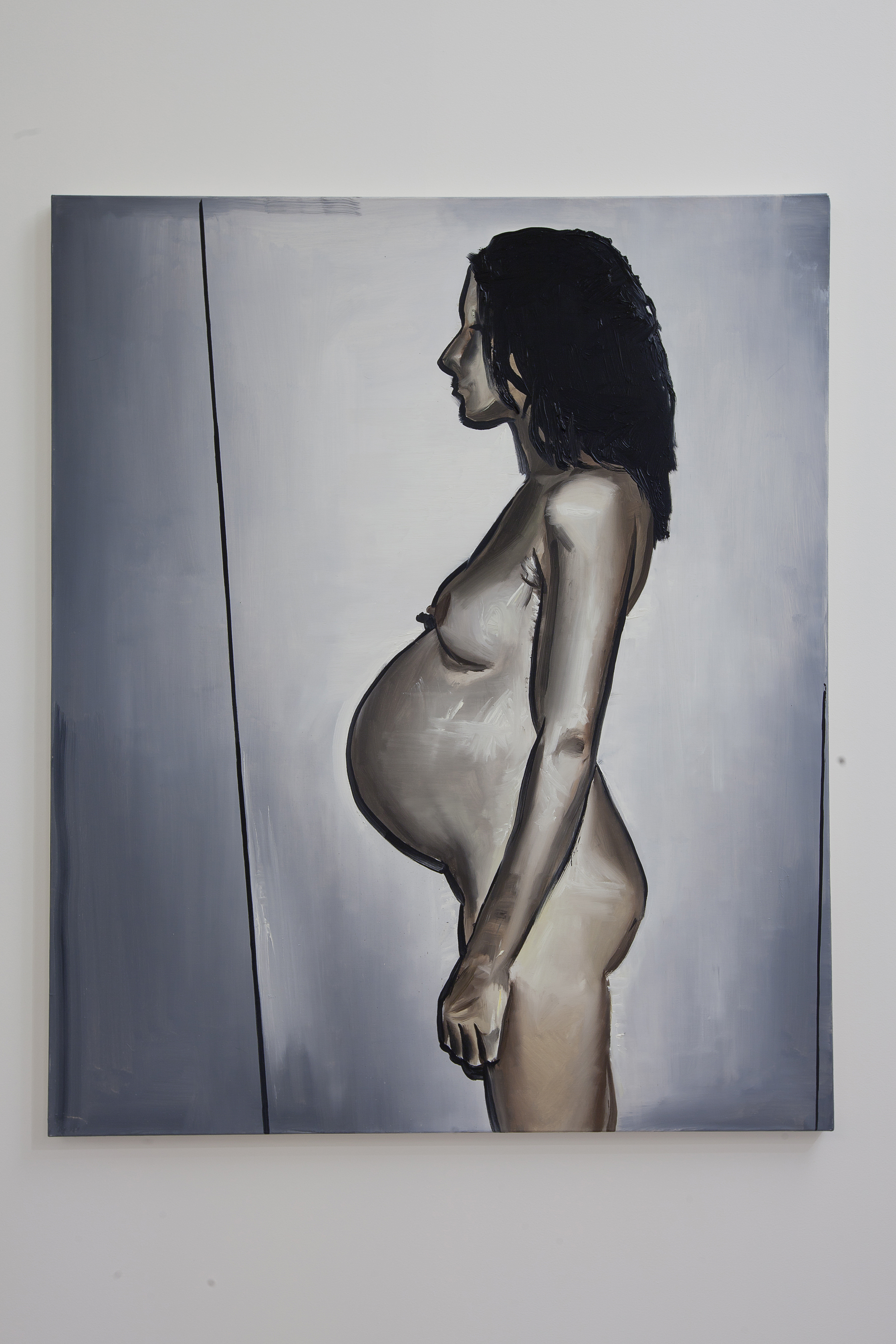
Wilhelm Sasnal, Anka, 2010, collection of the Museum of Modern Art, Warsaw

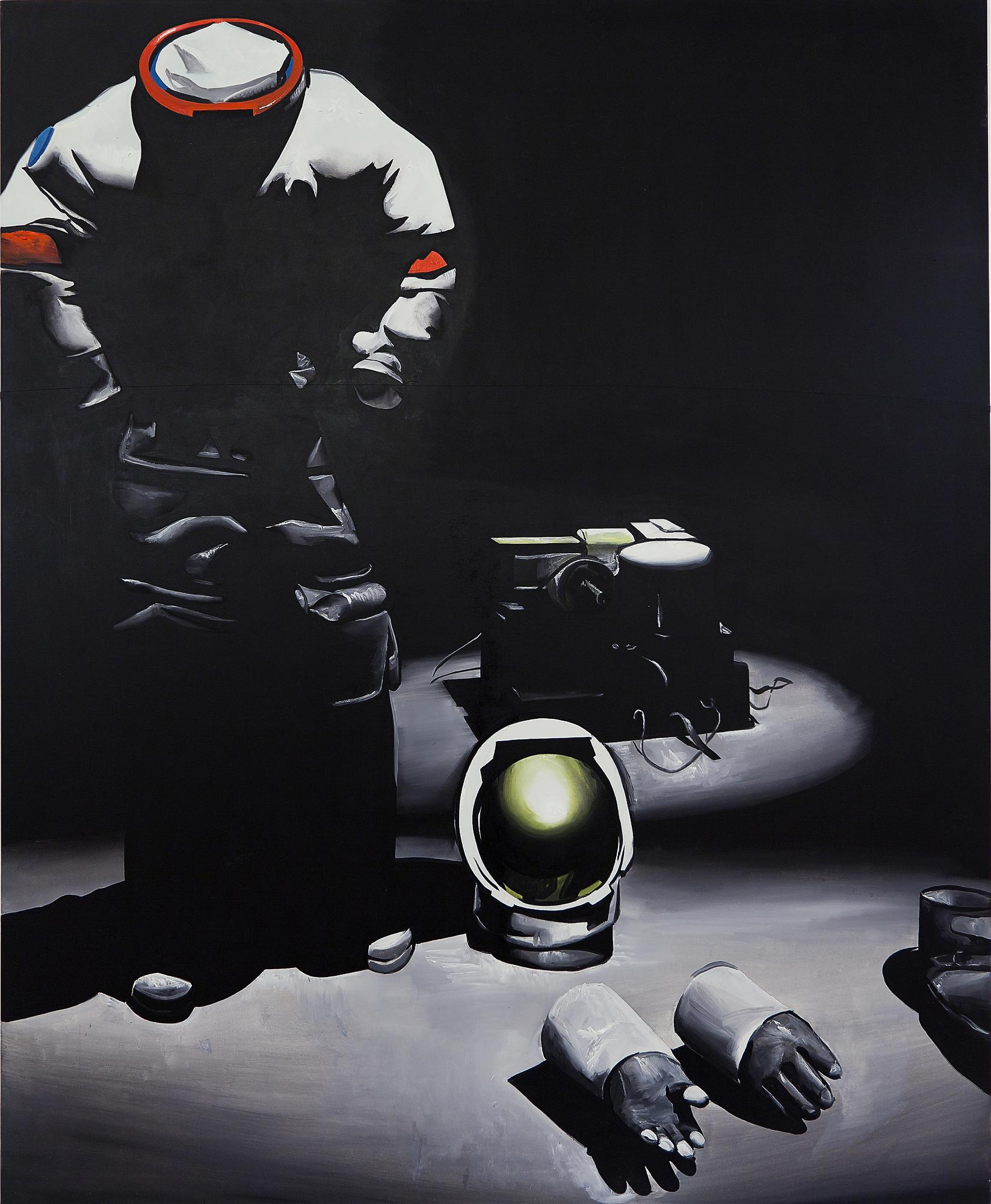
Wilhelm Sasnal, Untitled (Astronaut), 2011, Museum of Modern Art in Warsaw

Sasnal produces pencil drawings, ink drawings, photographs, videos and paintings. In his art he employs a variety of media and cultivates a non-uniform practice.

Sasnal is primarily a painter. He paints a wide variety of subjects: More or less banal everyday objects, portraits of historical figures, views of his home town Kraków, snapshots of friends and family members and very often existing images from the internet or mass media are his starting point. Other sources include Art Spiegelman's 1973 graphic Holocaust novel Maus, and stills from Claude Lanzmann's 1985 documentary Shoah as source material. Even if, over the years, one can make out a number of overarching themes, there are always new paintings that shift the emphases and connections once again. The same is true of his painting style. His approach is unpredictable and his methods range from graphic reduction and a pointedly two-dimensional, illustration-oriented style to seemingly autonomous gestures with brush and paint. Like Neo Rauch, however, Sasnal makes the grip of the Communist era on the post-Communist imagination his subject.

While painting is still at the centre of Sasnal's work, he has also increasingly turned to photography and film in recent years. The video work The Band (2002) was made during a live performance of indie rock band Sonic Youth. A 2007 piece is a product many times removed from the 1961 Polish movie on which it is based – a fictionalized account of a historical event in which a railway worker accidentally sold industrial methyl alcohol as vodka, causing widespread illness, blindness and death. The 16-mm film projection Untitled (2007) is based on found-footage from the late 1970s of Elvis Presley. Swiniopas (Swineherd) (2008), his first ever feature-length film, is an adaptation of an 1842 Hans Christian Andersen fairytale of the same name yet radically deviates from the original. Shot in black and white, Sasnal's version is set in bleak, rural Poland. It concerns a swineherd who smuggles letters back and forth between a farmer's daughter and her lesbian lover. Also in 2008, Sasnal caused controversy in Scotland with his film The Other Church, which focused on the brutal murder of the Polish student Angelika Kluk in Glasgow. In 2025, Sasnal released a feature-length film The Assistant – made together with his wife, Anka Sasnal – adapted from the novel The Assistant by Robert Walser.

== Collections ==
Sasnal's art work is in collections of such institutions as the Guggenheim Museum, the Saatchi Gallery and Tate Modern in London, POLIN Museum of the History of Polish Jews, MSN in Warsaw, and Museum of Modern Art in New York.

== Recognition ==
In 1999 Sasnal received the Grand Prix prize on the Bielska Jesień Painting Biannual and in 2003 the Pegasus (pol. Pegaz) award. In 2006, he claimed first place on the list of 100 emerging artists compiled by Flash Art magazine devoted to contemporary art. He is also the winner of the 2006 Vincent van Gogh Biennial Award for Contemporary Art in Europe. In 2014, he was awarded the Knight's Cross of the Order of Polonia Restituta in recognition for his outstanding achievements in the field of art. In 2022, he won the annual Paszport Polityki cultural award in the Creator of Culture category presented by the Polityka magazine. In July 2026, he received Rubens Prize.

== See also ==
- A monument to something that never happened (28.03.1983)
- List of Polish artists
- Igor Mitoraj
- Paweł Althamer
- Alina Szapocznikow
