= Ładnie group =

Polish artistic group (1996–2001)

The Ładnie group was an art ensemble active from 1996 to 2002, formed by Wilhelm Sasnal, Rafał Bujnowski, Marcin Maciejowski, students of the Kraków Academy of Fine Arts; and Józef Tomczyk, a model.

The group was formed by artists who attended the drawing class ran by Marek Firek. The group published magazine Słynne Pismo we Wtorek. The group met in the Roentgen club at the Szczepański Square. According to Wacława Milewska, Ładnie “mocked contemporary Polish reality, the symptoms of its provincialism and the perversions of the emerging capitalism.”
