= Mahmoud Younis =

Suez Canal nationalization Engineer

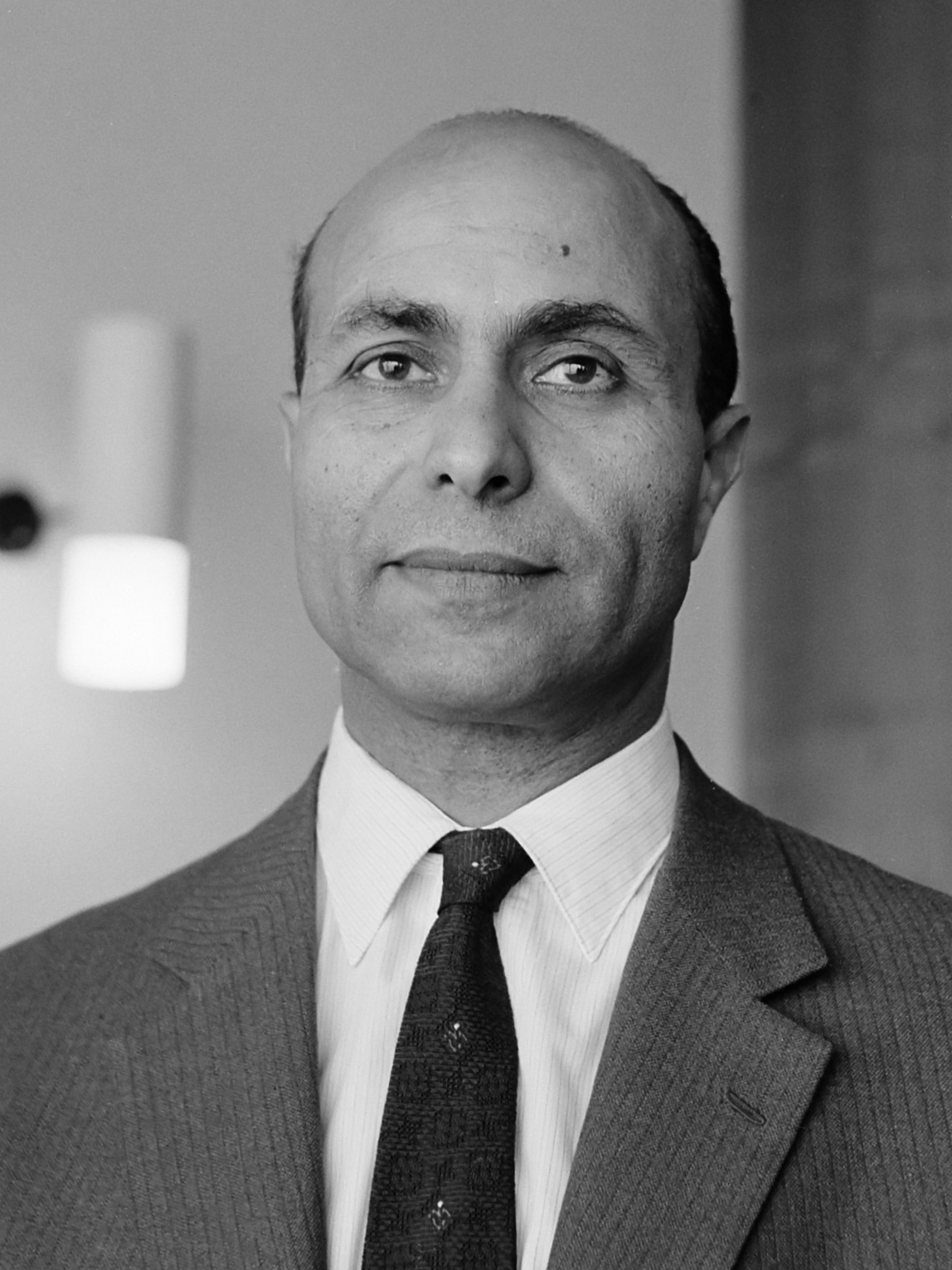
- Mahmoud Younis (1963)
- Born: April 12, 1911; Cairo, Egypt
- Died: April 18, 1976 (aged 65); Cairo, Egypt

Mahmoud Younis (Arabic: محمود يونس; April 12, 1911 – April 18, 1976) was an engineer of the Suez Canal nationalization on July 26, 1956. He served as Chairman of the Suez Canal Authority (July 10, 1957 – October 10, 1965). He also served as the head of engineers' syndicate during the rule of Gamal Abdel Nasser.
