= Michał Życzkowski =

Polish mechanical engineer

- Born: 12 April 1930; Kraków, Poland
- Died: 24 May 2006 (aged 76)
- Education: Tadeusz Kościuszko Kraków University of Technology, Imperial College London
- Employer: Tadeusz Kościuszko Kraków University of Technology

Michał Życzkowski (12 April 1930 – 24 May 2006) was a Polish mechanical engineer.

== Career ==
Życzkowski was born in Kraków. In 1954 he graduated at the Tadeusz Kościuszko Kraków University of Technology, and in 1958 he received a diploma at the Imperial College London. He became Professor and doctor honoris causa of the Tadeusz Kościuszko Kraków University of Technology, full member of Polish Academy of Sciences and Polish Academy of Learning, Foreign Corresponding Member of the Austrian Academy of Sciences.

He was the youngest professor in the history of Poland during his time. He became professor at the age of 31. He advised 29 Ph.D. students, 11 of them were promoted to professors.

He had four children, among them Karol Życzkowski. He died in his home city of Krakow.

== Editor ==
Member of Editorial Boards of:

- International Journal of Mechanical Sciences
- Structural Optimization
- Journal of Theoretical and Applied Mechanics
- Zeitschrift für Angewandte Mathematik und Mechanik.

== Works ==
- Sprężystość i plastyczność (with Wiesław Krzyś), Wydawnictwo Naukowe PWN Warsaw, 1962
- Obciążenia złożone w teorii plastyczności, Wydawnictwo Naukowe PWN Warsaw, 1973
  - Combined loadings in the theory of plasticity, Wydawnictwo Naukowe PWN Warsaw, 1981
  - 294 scientific publications
