= Karol Życzkowski =

Polish physicist (born 1960)

- Born: 1960 (age 65–66); Kraków, Poland
- Education: Jagiellonian University
- Father: Michał Życzkowski
- Scientific career
- Fields: Quantum physics
- Workplaces: Jagiellonian University

Karol Życzkowski (born 1960) is a Polish physicist and mathematician. He is a professor of physics at the Atomic Physics Department, Institute of Physics, of the Jagiellonian University in Kraków, Poland, and also at the Center for Theoretical Physics of the Polish Academy of Sciences in Warsaw. He worked as a Humboldt Fellow at the University of Essen (1989–1990) and as senior Fulbright Fellow at the University of Maryland, College Park (1996/97). In 2005/06 visiting scientist at the Perimeter Institute, Waterloo (Ontario).

Member of Academia Europaea since 2014. Życzkowski was a member of the Commission on European Matters PAU created by the Polish Academy of Learning. Życzkowski has contributed to quantum chaos, quantum measurement, entropy, and entanglement, the theory of voting and jointly with Wojciech Słomczyński designed the Jagiellonian Compromise - a voting system for the Council of the European Union. He worked on complex Hadamard matrices, numerical range and numerical shadow.
