= Cristian Ranalli =

Italian footballer (born 1979)

Personal information
- Date of birth: 12 April 1979 (age 47)
- Place of birth: Rome, Italy
- Height: 1.75 m (5 ft 9 in)
- Position: Forward

Youth career
- 1997–1998: Roma

Senior career*
Years	Team	Apps	(Gls)
1998–2000	Roma	0	(0)
1998–1999	→ Torres (loan)	30	(8)
1999–2000	→ Arezzo (loan)	13	(1)
2000	→ Nocerina (loan)	10	(2)
2000–2001	Lodigiani	0	(0)
2001–2002	Lanciano	42	(14)
2002–2003	Cagliari	7	(0)
2003–2005	Reggiana	23	(4)
2004	→ Cesena (loan)	11	(1)
2005	→ Cisco Roma (loan)	4	(1)
2005	→ Giulianova (loan)	7	(1)
2005–2006	Foggia	20	(2)
2006–2007	Cisco Roma	25	(3)
2007–2008	Giulianova	16	(1)
2008–2009	Isola Liri	24	(1)
2009–2010	Artena	?	(?)
2010–2011	Flaminia	?	(?)
Total		243	(41)
- * Club domestic league appearances and goals

Cristian Ranalli (born 12 April 1979) is a former Italian footballer.

== Club career ==
Born in the Lazio region of Rome, Ranalli started his career at Roma. He was loaned to Serie C2 sides Torres, Arezzo and Nocerina of Serie C1. In mid-2000, he joined Lodigiani on a co-ownership deal, for a nominal fee of 1 million Italian lire. He then joined Serie C2 side Lanciano in another co-ownership after being bought back from Lodigiani. He won the Champion in 2001 and scored 14 goals at Serie C1 next season.

=== Cagliari & doping administration ===
On 26 June 2002, he was bought back by Roma and 2 days later, on 28 June (2 days before the closure of 2001–02 fiscal year) exchanged with Gianluca Picciau of Serie B side Cagliari in another co-ownership deal. Both players was priced for €3.5 million (for 50% rights). Which later named as one of the victim of doping administration, as Roma also swapped backup players and even youth players with other teams with inflated price, and gained a "profit" of €55 billion. Doping administration was Italian media to describe the Italian clubs suspected to use cross-trading (exchange player with same price and contract length) and inflated the price in order to increase the profit of selling player. In although they did not received real money of selling player, the acquire cost was to amortized proportionality during the player contract (usually multi-year), overall it still appeared a profit in the first year fiscal report, in although most of the nominal value of the registration rights of new signings, were far higher than the fair value. Thus like took drug to enhance the economic situation.

That led to an investigation by prosecutor of Rome for a suspected false accounting in 2004. But Roma was fined €60,000 on 30 October 2007 by Criminal Court of Rome for irregularity on youth players transfer only, as cross trading and inflating the price itself is not illegal, prosecutor failed to prove the purpose behind is illegal against the clubs.

Ranalli made his league debut for the Sardinian side on 28 September 2002, against Genoa, he replaced Mauro Esposito in the 76th minutes. he played the next match in December, also a substitute. He played 5 more appearances from December to January as sub.

=== Reggiana ===
In June 2003, Cagliari gave the remained 50% rights of Picciau to Roma, and Roma also bought back Ranalli for just €50,000. Ranalli then sold to Reggiana in co-ownership deal for same price. He played half season for Reggiana, then for league rival Cesena, which the team won the promotion playoffs. In 2004–05 season, he returned to Reggiana. In January 2005, he left for Serie C2 side Cisco Roma (at that time known as Cisco Lodigiani) but in February for Giulianova of Serie C1.

=== Late career ===
On 31 August 2005, he was signed by Serie C1 side Foggia. In the next season, he returned to Cisco Roma at Serie C2. In 2007–08 season, he played for Serie C2 side Giulianova. He was rumored to leave the club in January, and after he played the full match in the 0–0 draw with Poggibonsi on 27 January 2008, he never played again for Giulianova. In 2008–09 season, he returned to Lazio region, this time for Lega Pro Seconda Divisione side Isola Liri. In 2009–10 season, he played for Artena of Eccellenza Lazio. One season later, he moved to Flaminia, where he would eventually retire.
