= Tadeusz Kościuszko Kraków University of Technology =

Public university with a technical profile in Kraków

PK Kraków University of Technology
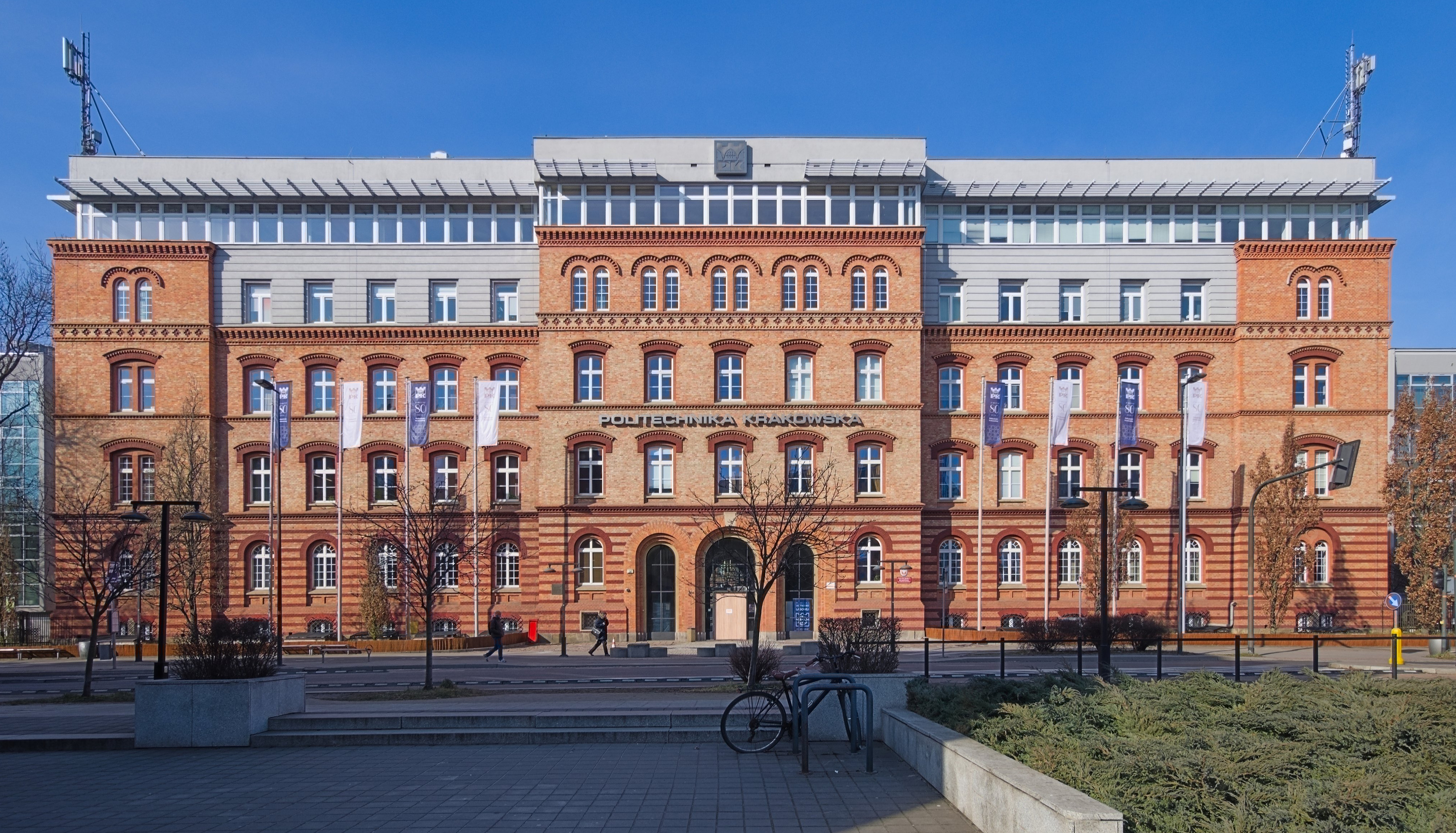
- Other names: Kraków University of Technology, Politechnika Krakowska im. Tadeusza Kościuszki
- Established: 1954
- Rector: Andrzej Szarata
- Students: c. 12 000 (2013)
- Location: Warszawska Street 24, Kraków, 31-155, Poland

University rankings

Global – Overall
- QS World: 1001-1200 (2026)

PK Kraków University of Technology (Polish: Politechnika Krakowska im. Tadeusza Kościuszki) is a public university with a technical profile in Kraków created in 1954 from some departments of AGH (established in 1946).

In September 1976, by a decree of the Council of Ministers of Poland, Tadeusz Kościuszko was appointed patron of the Kraków Polytechnic.

In 2004, Museum of the Kraków Polytechnic (Muzeum Politechniki Krakowskiej) was established.

== Bibliography ==
- Politechnika Krakowska 1946–1976. Stanisław Weiss (ed.). Kraków. 1976.
- Politechnika Krakowska 1945–1995. Władysław Muszyński (ed.). Kraków. 1995.
