= List of convenience shops in the United Kingdom =

This is a list of convenience shops in the United Kingdom.

== History ==
In mid-September 2015 Booker Group announced it would acquire Musgrave Retail Partners GB, owner of the Londis and Budgens brands for £40m, adding Londis's 1,630 convenience shops and 167 Budgens franchise outlets to its estate.

In December 2016, McColl's announced it would acquire 298 former Co-op shops

In August 2017, Sainsbury's announced it had entered exclusive talks to acquire Nisa, however talks were abandoned in August due to concerns over monopoly and competition inquiries. It was then announced that the Co-operative Group has entered talks to acquire Nisa. In November, the Co-op announced that the Nisa board had recommended members accept the Co-op's £140m offer for the company. In 2022, McColl's was placed in voluntary administration and purchased by Morrisons.

== Current ==
The list of current convenience stores has been split into those run by major retailers, and those that are symbol groups.

=== Major retailers ===
Shop name	Image	Founded/ Came to UK	Owned by	Notes
Aldi Local			Aldi	Smaller city centre c-store format, sized around 6,500 sq. ft.
Amazon Fresh		2021	Amazon	Chain of cashierless c-stores. Amazon also partner with several UK retailers including Morrisons, Booths and Co-op to sell groceries online through the Amazon UK website.
Asda Express			Asda	Chain of smaller c-store shops within the wider Asda business started in 2022, with plans for 300 by 2026. Asda also operate a petrol forecourt c-store estate and work with partners through the 'Asda On The Move' brand.
Circle K			Alimentation Couche-Tard	Leading forecourt and convenience retailer on the island of Ireland, with 49 sites in Northern Ireland.
Co-op Food		1844	Various consumers' co-operatives	Co-op Food is a brand used by a federation of approx. 15 UK consumers' co-operatives, together forming a supermarket brand which sources products from the Co-operative Retail Trading Group, and has the largest number of shops for a UK convenience shop multiple. The Co-operative Group is the largest member with around 2,400 owned and franchised stores (including larger supermarkets).
Heron Foods			B&M European Value Retail S.A.	Chain of approx. 300 convenience shops.
Iceland Local		2023	Iceland	New convenience format launched in 2023.
Lidl			Lidl	Smaller store format for predominantly urban locations.
Little Waitrose & Partners		2008	Waitrose	Small convenience shops selling Waitrose goods; aim to have 300 shops by 2018
M&S Simply Food		2005	Marks & Spencer and BP franchise agreement	120 convenience shops based within BP Connect roadside fuel stations
Morrisons Daily		2019	Morrisons	Convenience shop chain with approx. 480 company-owned and franchise stores
One Stop			Tesco	Approx. 1,000 owned and franchised stores.
Poundland Local			Poundland	Chain of convenience shops
Sainsbury's Local		1998	Sainsbury's	Chain of approx. 800 convenience shops run by Sainsburys
Tesco Express			Tesco	Second smallest shops in Tesco family; approx. 2,000 shops nationwide

=== Symbol groups and chains ===
Shop name	Image	Founded/ Came to UK	Owned by	Notes
Bargain Booze Select Convenience		1981	Bestway Wholesale	Chain of franchised convenience shops operated by Britain's biggest off licence chain. Bargain Booze Purchased Central Stores in December 2017.
Best-one		1990	Bestway Wholesale	A Symbol group with over 2,000 convenience shops located in England & Jersey, CI
Blakemore Retail		1917	Privately owned	UK's largest family owned operator of convenience shops; operate as a member of Spar UK. Took on a number of My Local shops after the collapse of the chain.
Budgens		1872	Tesco (Booker Group)	Symbol group in England and Wales founded in 1872.
Central Convenience Stores			Bestway Wholesale	Central is a franchise based convenience shop chain based in the Dorset area.
Costcutter		1986	Bestway Wholesale	Symbol group and convenience shops supplied by Nisa; operates under the Costcutter, mycostcutter, Mace, Supershop and kwiksave brands
Day-Today (Scotland)		2003	United Wholesale	Symbol group founded in 2003, there are now over 300 Day-Today convenience stores in Scotland.
Family Choice			Tesco (Booker Group)	Symbol Group
Family Shopper		2014	Tesco (Booker Group)	Discount symbol group set up by Booker to run alongside Premier and offer more discounted lines
Go Local Extra			A G Parfetts Cash & Carry	Symbol group for independent shops owned by A G Parfetts
Greens Retail			Greens	Scotland's leading chain of Convenience Stores (formerly Eros Retail). Operating 16+ stores throughout Scotland as of March 2023, with substantial growth aspirations and plans to achieve a £100m annualised sales target from 50+ stores..
GT Retail			James Retail Group	Chain of convenience shops located in the Midlands and North of England
HKS Retail Ltd		1984		Operator Petrol stations and convenience shops across the Midlands
Jones Convenience Stores		1911	Privately owned	Chain of 16 convenience shops located in Somerset
KeyStore		1995	J.W Filshill	A leading Scottish convenience symbol group.
Lifestyle Express			Unitas Wholesale	Symbol group of independent shops, roughly 2000 in number operating
Londis		1959	Tesco (Booker Group)	Symbol group and convenience shops
Mace (Northern Ireland)			Musgrave	Symbol group, previously in the United Kingdom through Bestway Wholesale (United Kingdom)
Nisa		1977	The Co-operative Group	Symbol group; formerly Nisa-Today's, which supplies around 5,000 stores
Park & Shop		1975	Park Garage Group	Own-brand
Premier		1994	Tesco (Booker Group)	Symbol group with over 2400 shops that are independently owned
Proudfoot Supermarkets		1946	Privately owned	Chain of supermarkets/convenience stores in the Scarborough area
Select & Save			Privately owned	Chain of 100 symbol group convenience shops supplied by Nisa
Shop'N Drive		2012	Rontec	Chain of convenience shops located at roadside fuel stations
Simply Fresh			Bestway Wholesale	Symbol group of 25 convenience shops, affiliated to Costcutter
Spar		1957	SPAR International B.V.	Symbol group, overseen by five wholesalers: James Hall & Co, Henderson Wholesale Ltd, CJ Lang & Son Ltd, Appleby Westward Group Ltd and AF Blakemore
Today's Extra		1985	Unitas Wholesale	Retailers' cooperative & symbol group of around 400 convenience shops; formerly part of Nisa-Today
USave		2003	United Wholesale (Scotland)	Symbol group founded in 2003, there are now over 200 USave convenience shops in Scotland.
Welcome			Southern Co-op	Franchised convenience chain with approx. 69 stores focused on southern England.
Whistlestop			Select Service Partner	Convenience chain primarily focused on rail, coach and airport locations. Select Service Partner also operate Marks & Spencer Simply Food sites at major railway and motorway service stations.

== Defunct ==
Shop name	Image	Founded / Came to UK	Fate	Notes
Aberness			Bought by Somerfield in 2004	Scottish convenience chain
Alldays		1991	Bought by the Co-operative Group	Convenience shop group set up in 1991 by Watson & Philip which went into receivership in 2002
All 'Ours			Merged with Premier Stores	Symbol group within the Moffat company
Bells Stores			Bought by Sainsbury's in 2004, branded as Sainsbury's at Bells before being converted to Sainsbury's Local	Small chain of 54 convenience shops in the North East England
Botterils Convenience Shops		c.1950s	Bought by Scotmid in 2010.	Small chain of 51 convenience shops in Scotland
Central Shops		2013	Conviviality Retail in 2017	
Circle K			Bought by Watson & Philip in 1993 for £21m and re-branded Alldays	American-owned convenience shops
Cullens		2004	Bought by Tesco from Adminstore	Presence in central London, operating since 1876; part of Adminstore group which also owned Europa and Harts
David Sands		1812	Bought by Co-operative Group in 2012	Chain of 28 convenience shops located in Scotland
Dawn Til Dusk		1986	Went into receivership in 1999	was an English chain of 90 convenience shops located throughout the North of England
Dillons				Symbol group. Rebranded as One Stop in early 2000’s
Europa		2004	Bought by Tesco from Adminstore	Presence in central London; part of Adminstore group which also owned Cullens and Harts
Happy Shopper			Purchased by Booker Group	Formerly a Symbol group but now a sub brand sold in Premier Stores after the purchase of parent company Nurdin and Peacock
Harts		2004	Bought by Tesco from Adminstore	Presence in central London; part of Adminstore group which also owned Cullens and Europa
Healds Day & Nite			Bought by Tesco owned One Stip in 2000	Chain of 98 convenience shops
Jacksons Stores		1991	Bought by Sainsbury's in 2004, branded as Sainsbury's at Jacksons Stores before being converted to Sainsbury's Local	Regional in Yorkshire and North Midlands
Karolina Shop		2008	Closed in 2021	Chain of 19 Polish shops across Northern Ireland
Local Plus		2001	Bought by the Co-operative Group	Chain of 64 convenience shops created by a management buyout of South West Alldays shops
McColl's		Morrisons	Bought in 2022 and converted to the Morrisons Daily format by September 2024.	
Loco		2012	Purchased by The Co-operative Group (Nisa Group)	Symbol group run by Nisa, which had 50 shops nationwide by 2013 Fascia retired and replaced with Nisa Express format.
Misselbrook & Weston (M&W)				Original operator of One Stop, later bought out by T&S Stores operator of Dillons
Melias			Bought by Dee Corporation	Chain of convenience shops owned by Fine Fare; rebranded or sold after Gateway purchase
Morning, Noon & Night		1991	Bought by Scotmid in 2004	
My Local		2011	Went into administration in late June 2016, all shops closed by early July 2016.	Chain of convenience shops created by Morrisons initially under M Local name; sold as part of re-organisation and was renamed My Local in September 2015.
RS McColl's			Scottish McColl's stores, bought by Morrisons in 2022 and converted by September 2024.	
7-Eleven			Taken over by Budgens	Convenience shop chain
Sperrings		1985	Became Circle K	A chain of convenience stores founded by Bob Sperring
Swift			Purchased by Iceland Foods	Chain of convenience shops. Stores closed in 2023.
Ugo		2011	Owned by Haldanes Group	Chain of 22 convenience shops created by Haldanes after purchasing shops from Netto; went into administration in 2012
VG			Shops rebranded either Spar or Alldays (which itself became part of the Co-operative Group)	
Wavy Line				Small chain of small supermarkets and convenience shops located in the South and South East of England

== See also ==
- List of supermarket chains in the United Kingdom
- List of convenience stores
