= HSBC Bank plc v Madden =

- Court: Court of Appeal of England and Wales
- Decided: 31 July 2000
- Citations: [2000] EWCA Civ 330, [2000] ICR 1283

Court membership
- Judges sitting: Nourse LJ, Mummery LJ and Rix LJ

Keywords
- Unfair dismissal

HSBC Bank plc v Madden and Post Office v Foley [2000] EWCA Civ 330 is a UK labour law case, concerning unfair dismissal, now governed by the Employment Rights Act 1996.

== Facts ==
Mr Madden worked in two different HSBC branches (previously Midland Bank, the Enfield Town and Palmers Green branches) where three debit cards went missing, and he was present on two occasions. There was an internal investigation. Police came but found nothing. HSBC dismissed him anyway, because they could not find anybody else.

Tribunal found the dismissal was unfair because the investigation showed no evidence of anything. There should have been further investigation.

== Judgment ==
The Court of Appeal held that the employer was entitled to dismiss him, and the Tribunal should not have substituted its view for the employers’. No reasonable tribunal could have said the investigation was not proper. Mummery LJ said the law is what was stated in Iceland Frozen Foods Ltd v Jones (not mentioning British Leyland UK Ltd v Swift) and said that Haddon v Van Den Bergh Foods Ltd was wrong to suggest that it was a perversity test. He said Parliament should change it, even though he was aware of opinions critical, and quoted Lord Nicholls in Inco Europe Ltd v First Choice Distribution [2000] 1 WLR 586, 592E on the separation of legislation and interpretation. He noted that Parliament had not acted to change the interpretations on the legislation, and so the reasonable range of responses test remained good.

== See also ==
- UK labour law
