= Robin Arora =

British businessman (born 1985)

- Born: January 1985 (age 41)
- Occupation: Businessman
- Title: Director, B&M Stores
- Spouse: Esha Babber
- Relatives: Simon Arora (brother); Bobby Arora (brother)

Robin Arora (born January 1985) is a British businessman and director of the retail chain B&M.

== Early life ==
Born in Manchester in an Indian family, Arora is the youngest of three brothers, Simon Arora and Bobby Arora. Their businessman father had immigrated to the UK from Delhi in the 1960s. Before going into business, he studied business at the University of Reading.

His brothers acquired B&M Stores in December 2004 from Phildrew Investments.

== Career ==
Arora joined the business alongside his brothers in 2008, and was appointed a director at B&M Stores in 2014.

== Personal life ==
In 2013, Arora become the UK's first billionaire under the age of 30.

In 2014, Tatler described Arora as "a Woosterish wag with a strong line in tartan blazers".

In 2015, he married Esha Arora, née Babber.
