= Bobby Arora =

British billionaire businessman (born 1972)

- Born: January 1972 (age 54)
- Occupation: Businessman
- Title: Trading director, B&M
- Relatives: Simon Arora (brother); Robin Arora (brother)

Bobby Arora (born January 1972) is a British billionaire businessman, trading director of the retail chain B&M.

== Early life ==
Bobby was born to an Indian family in January 1972. His businessman father had immigrated to the UK from Delhi in the 1960s.

== Career ==
In 1995, he went into business with his brother Simon Arora, and founded Orient Sourcing Services, importing homewares from Asia and supplying them to UK retail chains, before buying B&M in 2004, which was then a struggling grocery chain based in Blackpool. He has been trading director of B&M since 2005.

Jointly with his brothers Simon and Robin, they have made £2.1 billion since taking over the Blackpool-based grocery chain in 2004. Their earnings soared during the COVID-19 pandemic.

=== COVID-19 rates relief ===
In March 2020, as a result of the COVID-19 pandemic in the United Kingdom, Rishi Sunak, then Chancellor of the Exchequer, gave business rates relief and furlough payments to businesses in the hospitality and retail sectors. B&M was among several businesses classified as 'essential retailers' and as a result was allowed to remain open when other 'non-essential businesses had to close. In November 2020, B&M and other retailers were subject to a public outcry for having not handed back payments totalling £1.8 billion intended for propping up retailers prevented from trading due to restrictions, despite making record profits. The retailer declared £296m in profit and as a result issued a £250m special dividend despite having received £38m in business rates relief and £3.7m in furlough payments. The Arora brothers received a combined total of £37m of the special dividend due to their 15% shareholding which is said to worth at least £750m. The firm agreed to pay £80m in business rate relief it had saved, a move mirrored by major supermarkets including Tesco, Sainsbury's and Morrisons.

== Personal life ==
Simon describes his brother Bobby as a "born trader". Arora lives in Hale Barns near Altrincham, next door to his brother Simon. In May 2023 a helicopter carrying Prime Minister Rishi Sunak landed in Bobby Arora's back garden.

He is a donor to the Conservative Party.
