= Polish shops in the British Isles =

Food retailers stocking Polish food products in the British Isles

Polish shop
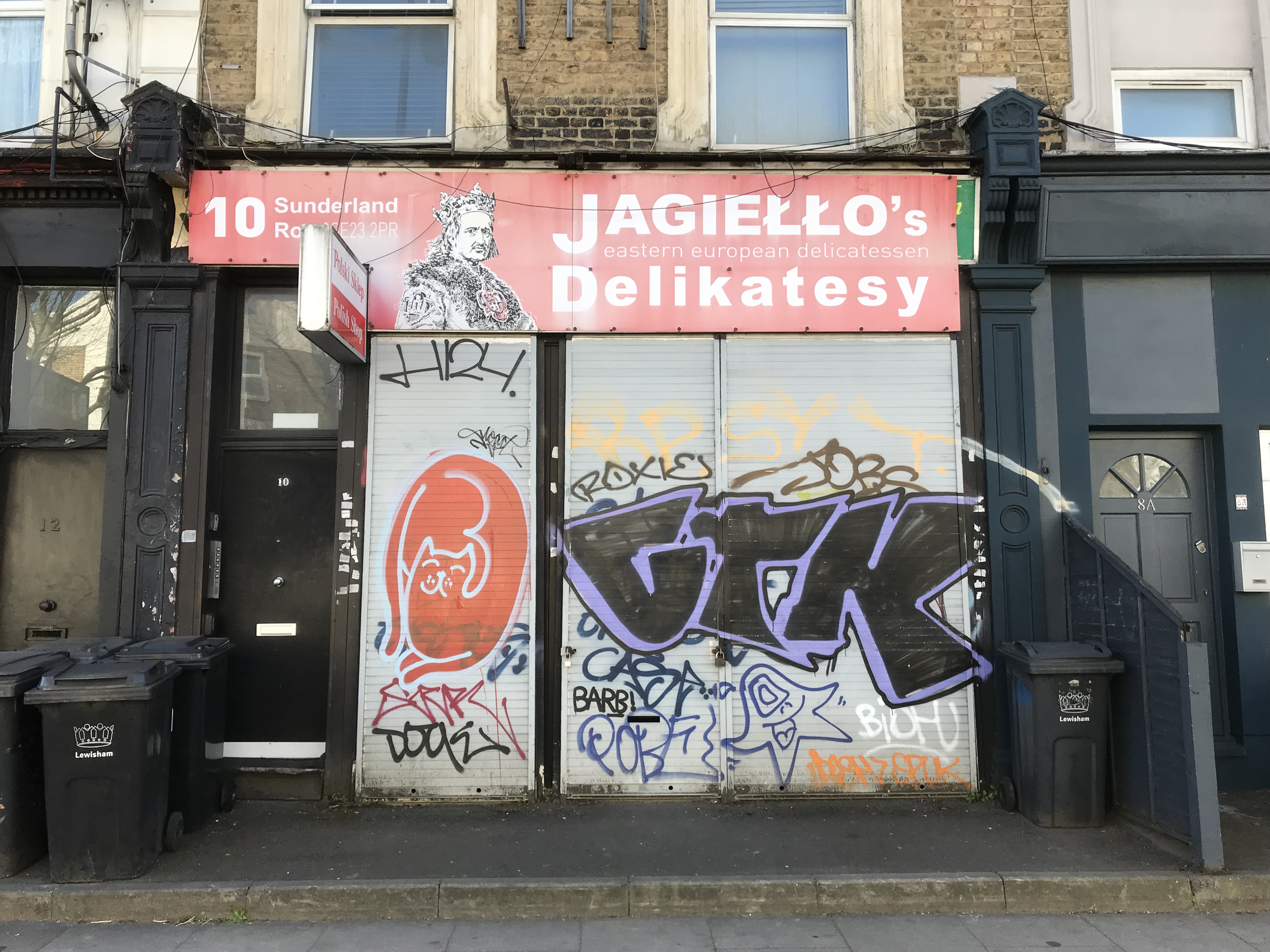
- Frontage of a Polish shop in Forest Hill, of which the Polish name, Jagiełło's Delikatesy, incorporates the English possessive
- Native name: Polski sklep
- Type: Grocers and convenience store
- Area served: British Isles
- Products: Food and drink

A Polish shop, also known as a polski sklep, is a type of delicatessen, in the British Isles that retails various types of Polish food products. In 2014 there were estimated to be up to 500 Polish shops in the United Kingdom (UK), their presence is considered to be a prominent symbol of the Polish community.

== History ==
=== Establishment ===
The first Polish shops were opened in the UK following the Polish Resettlement Act 1947, which allowed Poles who had fought in World War II to remain in Britain. This first wave of Polish shops was small in number and such establishments were often elusive, being attached to private members clubs or Roman Catholic churches serving the Polish community. However, in the 1990s more Polish shops began trading, including what would become one of the largest chains Mleczko. By the beginning of the 21st century there were an estimated 25 Polish shops in London, concentrated in areas with established Polish communities such as Hammersmith, Ealing and Camden Town.

=== Rise ===
The influx of Poles to the UK and the Republic of Ireland following the 2004 enlargement of the European Union resulted in a significant expansion of Polish shops across the British Isles, with The Grocer estimating up to 500 such businesses across the United Kingdom by 2014.

=== Decline ===
By 2016 the amount of Polish shops had begun to decline. This has been attributed to a cultural shift, with the assimilation of Polish immigrants into British communities. The Brexit referendum was also predicted to have an effect on Polish shops. However, the declining number of Polish shops may also be due to increased competition from supermarket chains seeking to capitalise on the market for Polish products. In 2008 Tesco doubled its range of Polish products, and the following year extended sales to 563 of its outlets. Other chains including Asda and Sainsbury's also stock Polish products. The adoption of Polish products by established supermarkets was cited as a major factor in, what had become, Northern Ireland's largest independent chain, Karolina Shop, closing in 2021. However, other independent retailers have reported a rise in sales following the promotion of Polish food at larger supermarket chains.

== Services and stock ==
Polish shops stock a range of consumable food and drink items which will typically include sourdough, whole wheat and rye breads, kasza, fermented foods such as marinated mushrooms, sauerkraut, and various types of pickled cucumbers. Other national specialities retailed in Polish shops include ptasie mleczko, śmietana, kissel, włoszczyzna, and paluszki. A range of non-alcoholic beverages such as kompot, kwas chlebowy and kefir are sold alongside Polish beer brands including Lech, Tyskie, Żubr and Żywiec. Polish shops often incorporate a deli counter serving a range of traditional dishes from homemade pierogi to twaróg, serek wiejski, wędliny and kielbasa.

Polish shops will also offer seasonal delicacies such as bigos, makowiec, opłatek, pascha and Babka Wielkanocna. Aside from edible products, stock may often include household goods, Polish literature such as newspapers, magazines, and books, tobacco products, and clothing items such as football scarves. Services such as money transfers are also offered.

Interioirs
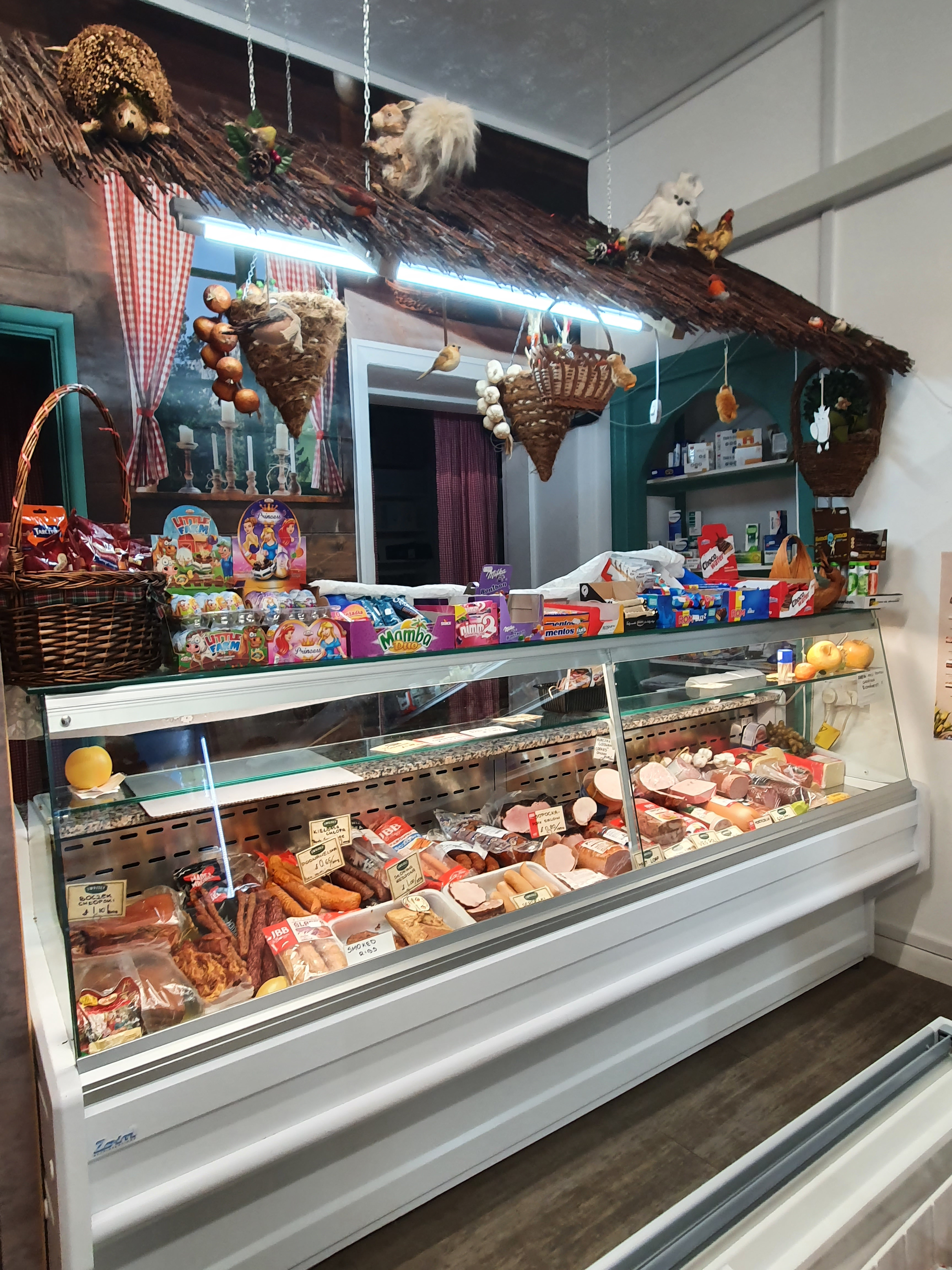
The deli counter of a Polish shop in St Austell, Cornwall

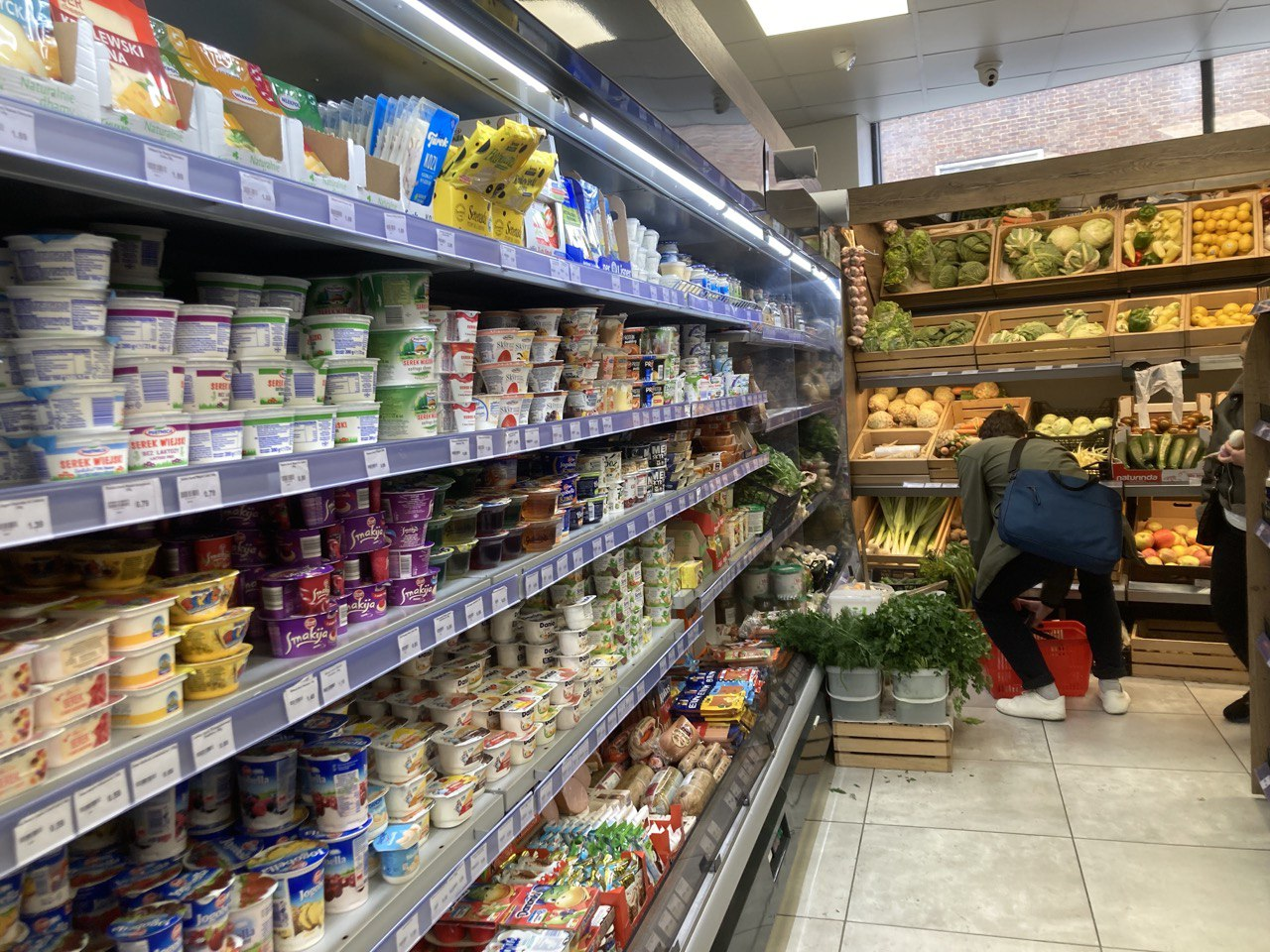
Refrigerated aisle of a Polish shop

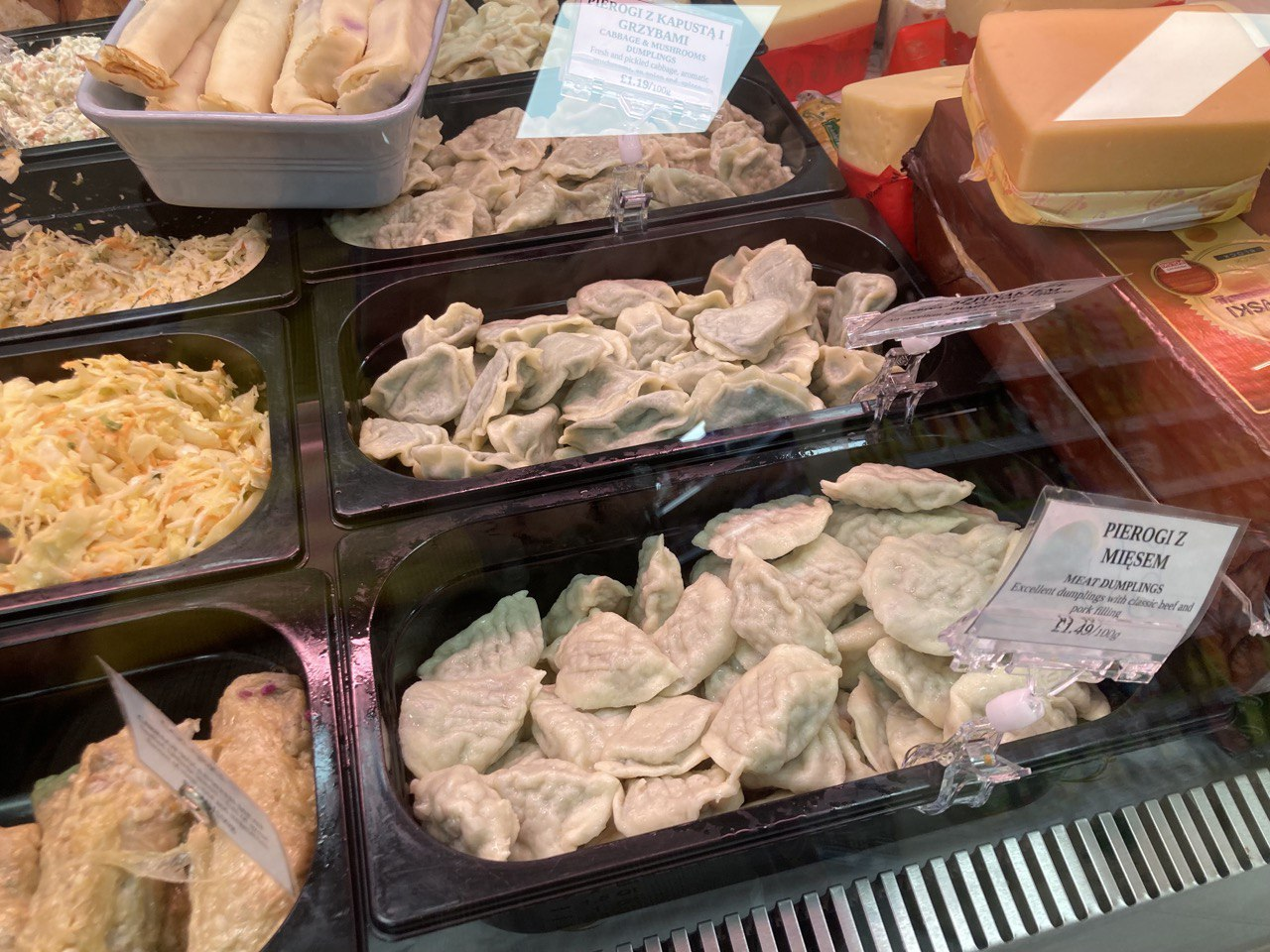
Fresh pierogi on display behind a deli counter

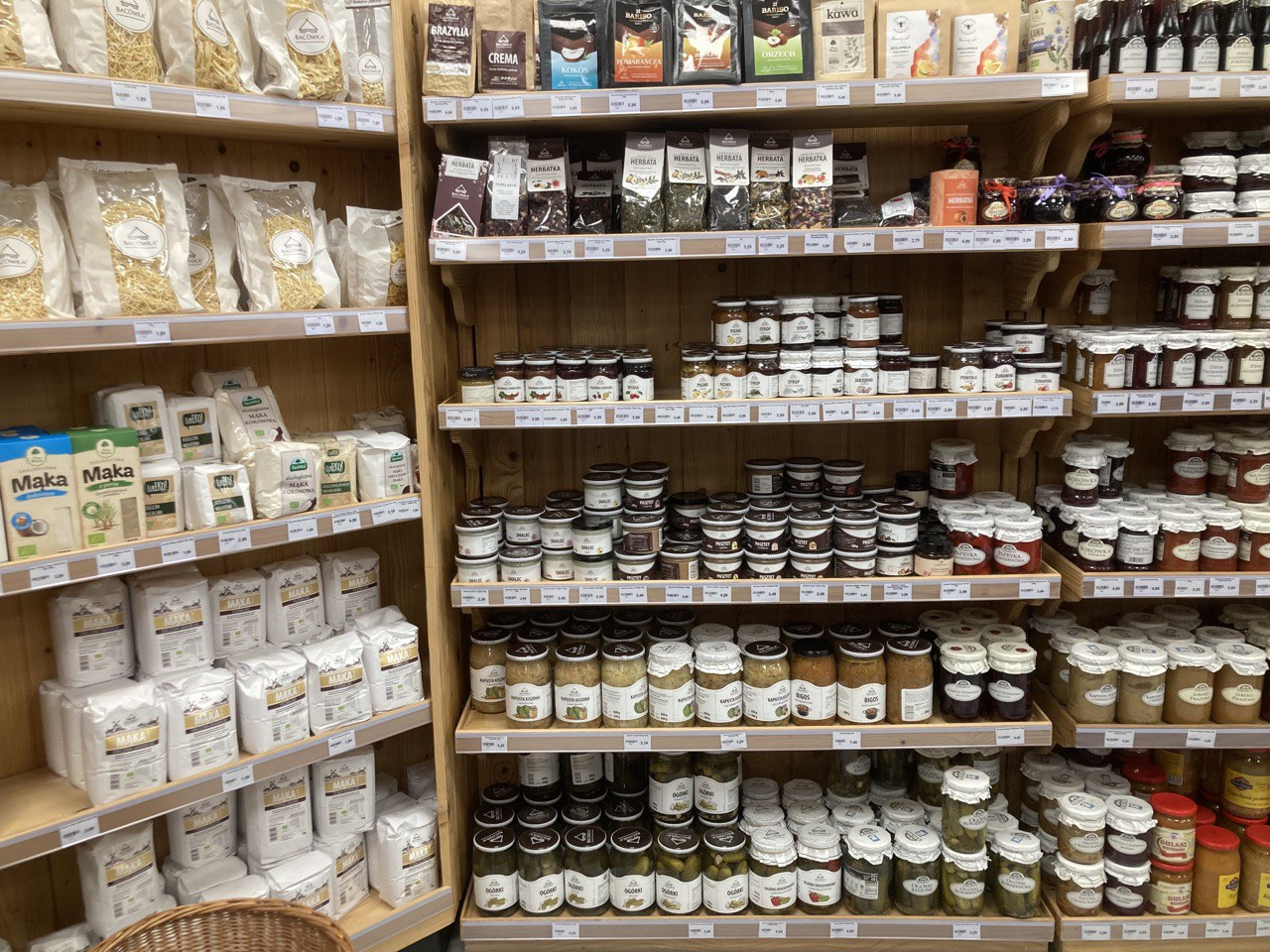
Various flours, pickles, fruit preserves, and herbal teas on display

== Dispersal and cultural identity ==
Polish shops are found throughout the British Isles, both in urban and rural areas that have attracted Polish immigrants. While metropolitan areas such as Greater Manchester, which hosts the largest Polish shop in the North West, can support many shops, smaller towns also accommodate them. Polish shops reflect the cultural identity of their clientele through the incorporation of references to well-known Polish brands, or simply by their presence in sectarian areas of Northern Ireland. Polish shops cater to a predominantly working class shopper, representative of the social base of Polish immigration to the British Isles. Many Polish shop fronts adopt a garish aesthetic designed to evoke the post-communist visual culture of Poland. For example, shop signs are often designed to reference a typographic style known as TypoPolo, incorporate the red and white of the Polish flag, use Polish names, and incorporate colourful vinyl coverings which are often used in conjunction with smaller adverts and handwritten signs.

Research into Polish shops in London has found that they serve an important function within immigrant communities as spaces that root shoppers to their homeland. This is partly achieved through the interior design of the shops themselves and the arrangement of their stock. Polish shops often use Slavic customs, folklore and the aesthetic of the communist era to evoke an exaggerated sense of Polishness.

== Gallery ==
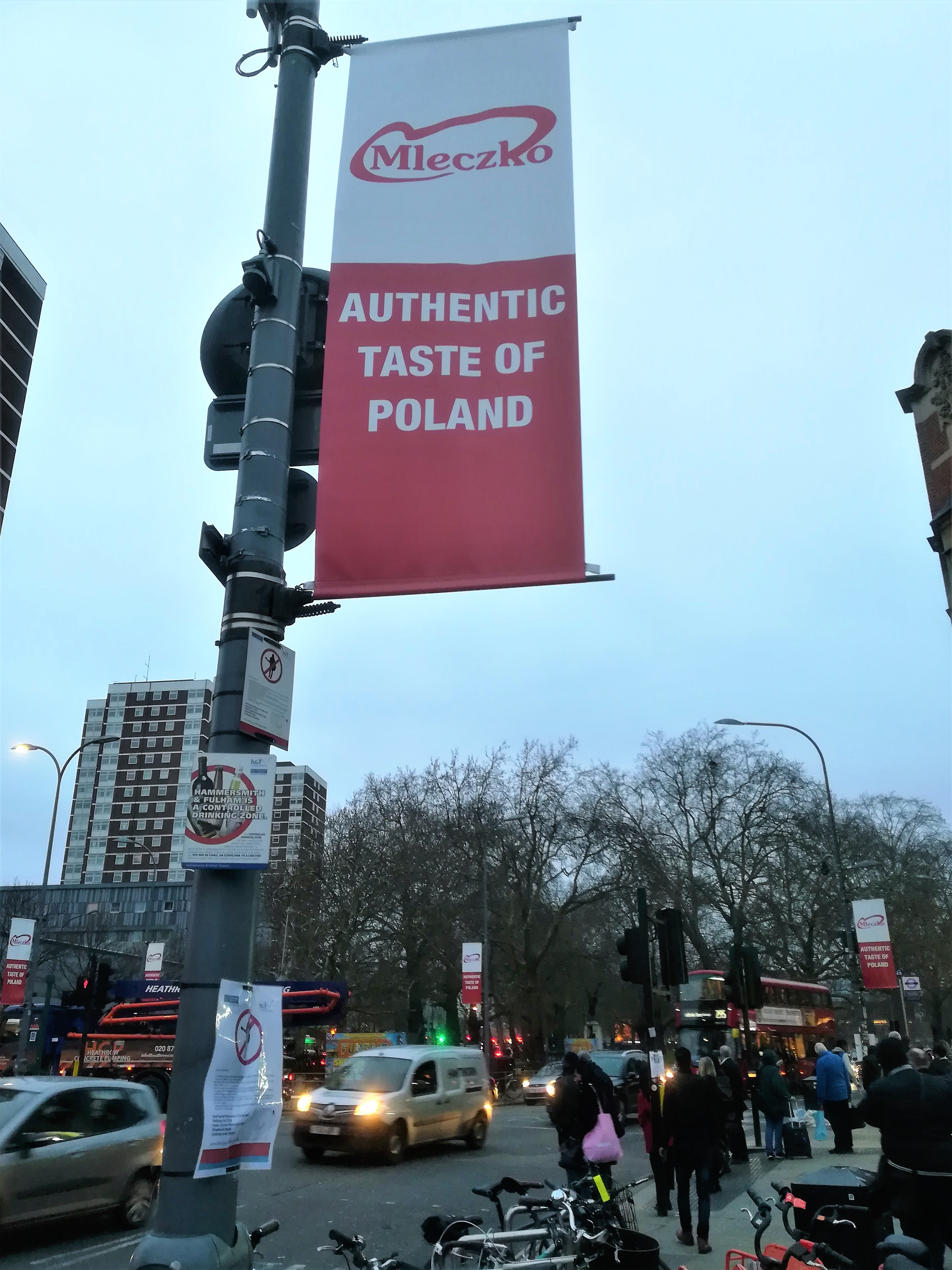
An advert for the chain Mleczko in Shepherd's Bush, London

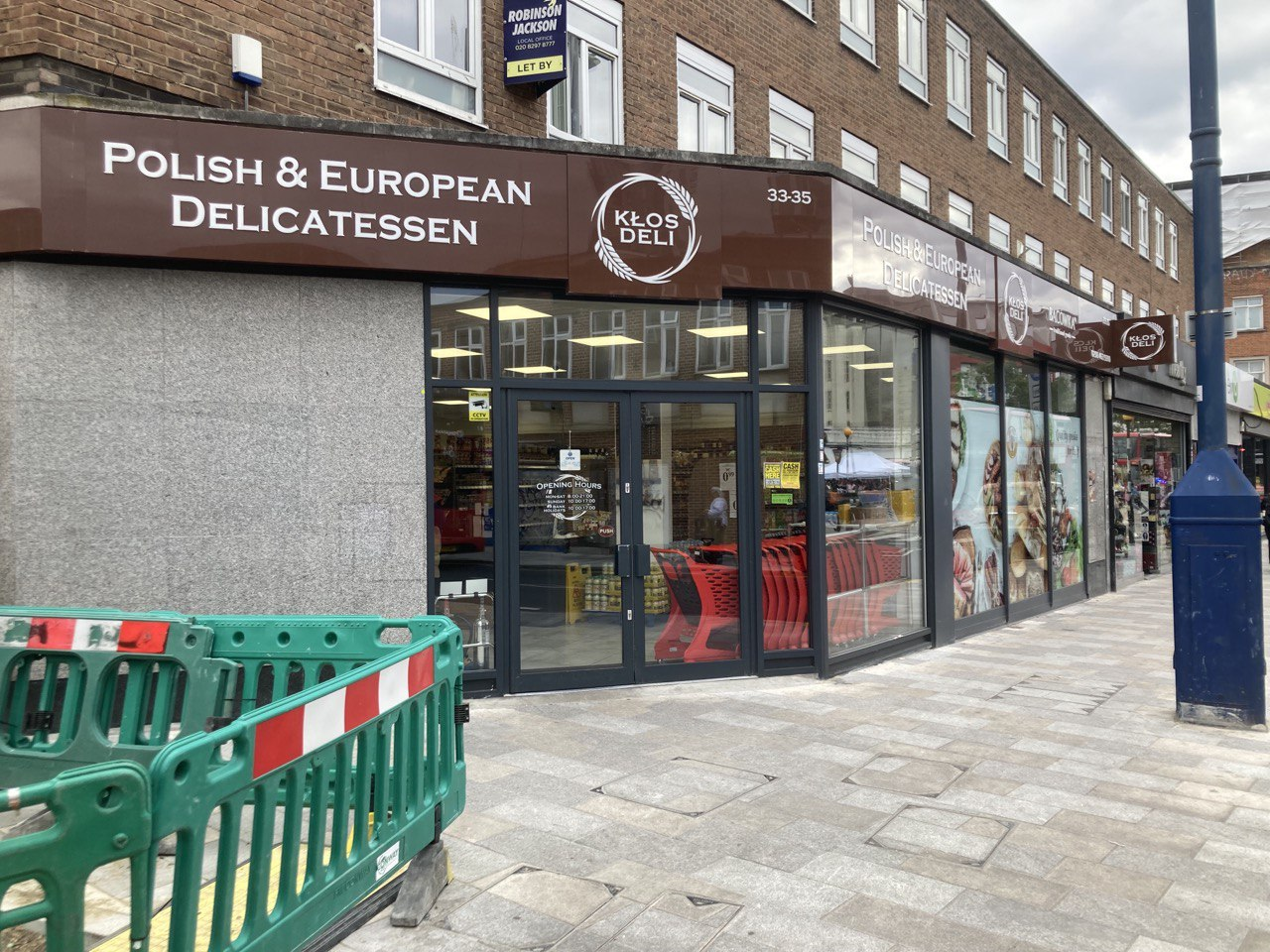
The Kłos Deli in Lewisham

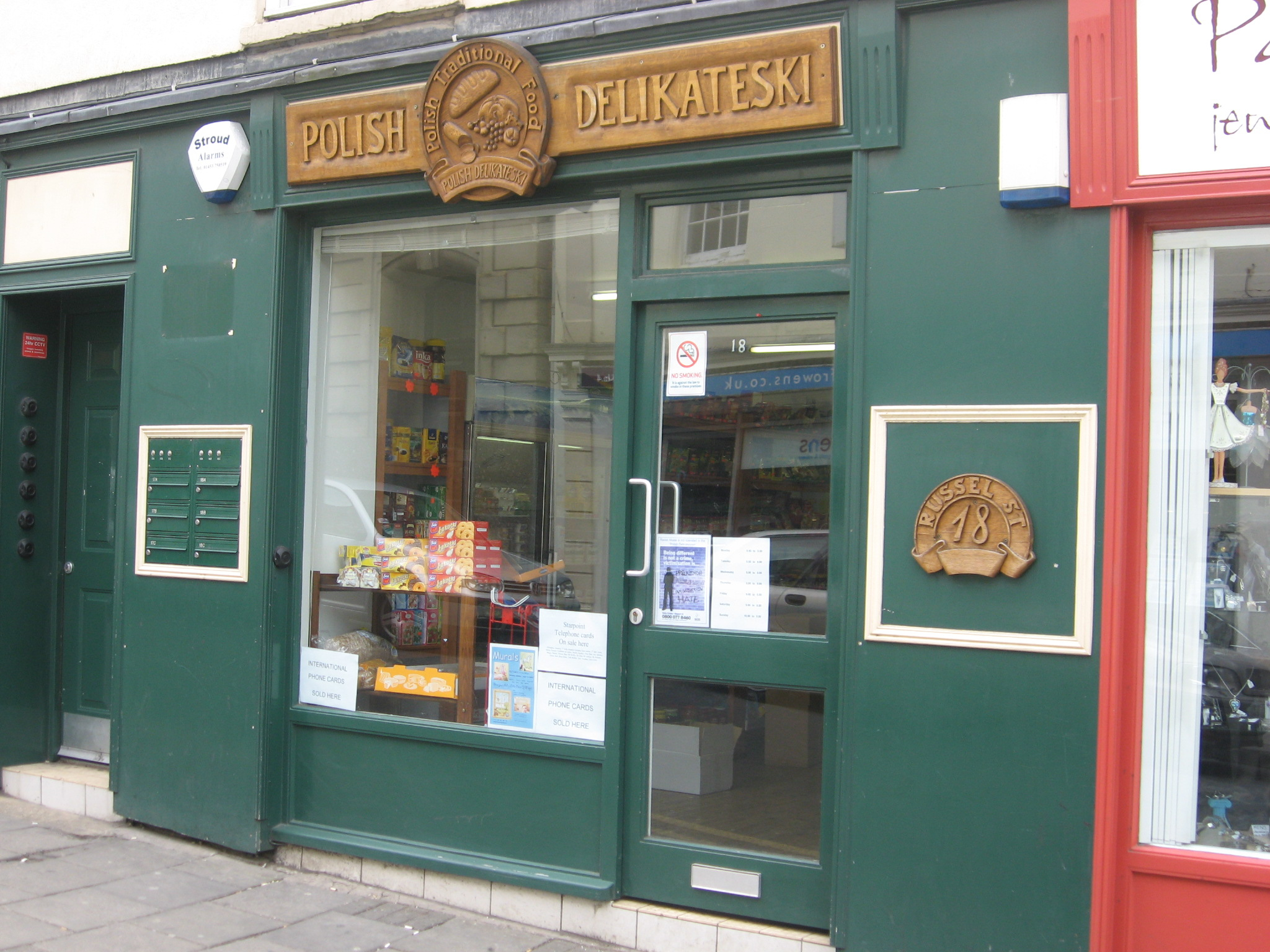
A Polish shop in Stroud using the macaronic hybrid name 'Polish Delikateski'

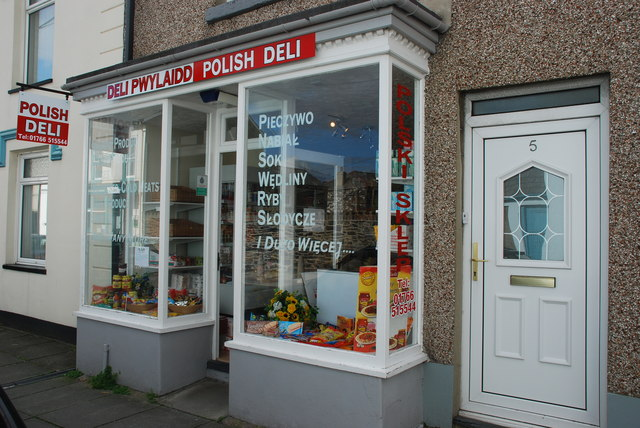
A Polish shop in Penllyn, the bilingual sign of which, 'Deli Pwylaidd Polish Deli', incorporates Welsh and English

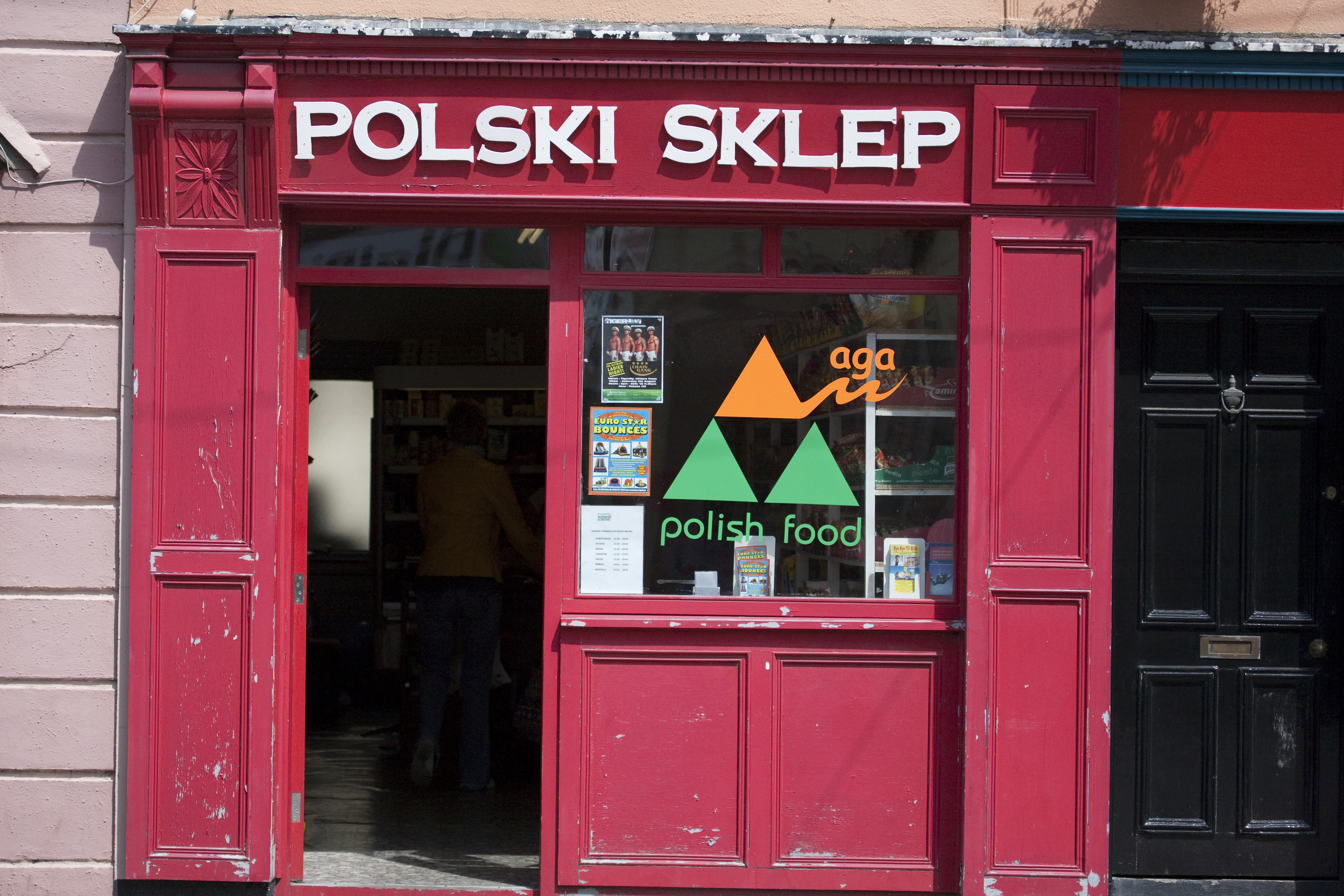
The Polski Sklep in Kildare, Republic of Ireland

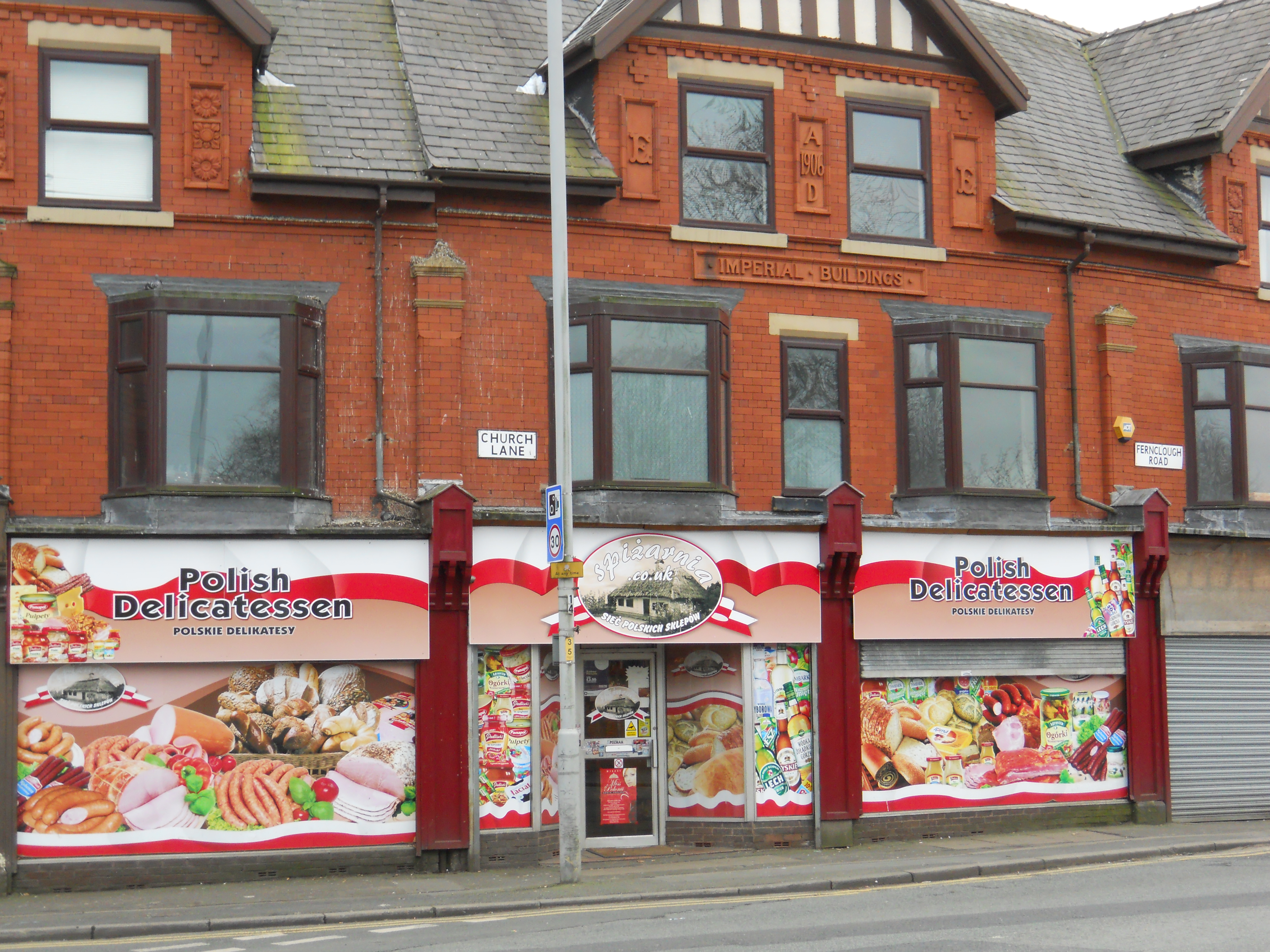
A Polish shop in Harpurhey incorporating the typical aesthetic of red and white, garish window vinyls, and a vintage image of a traditional spiżarnia on its shopfront

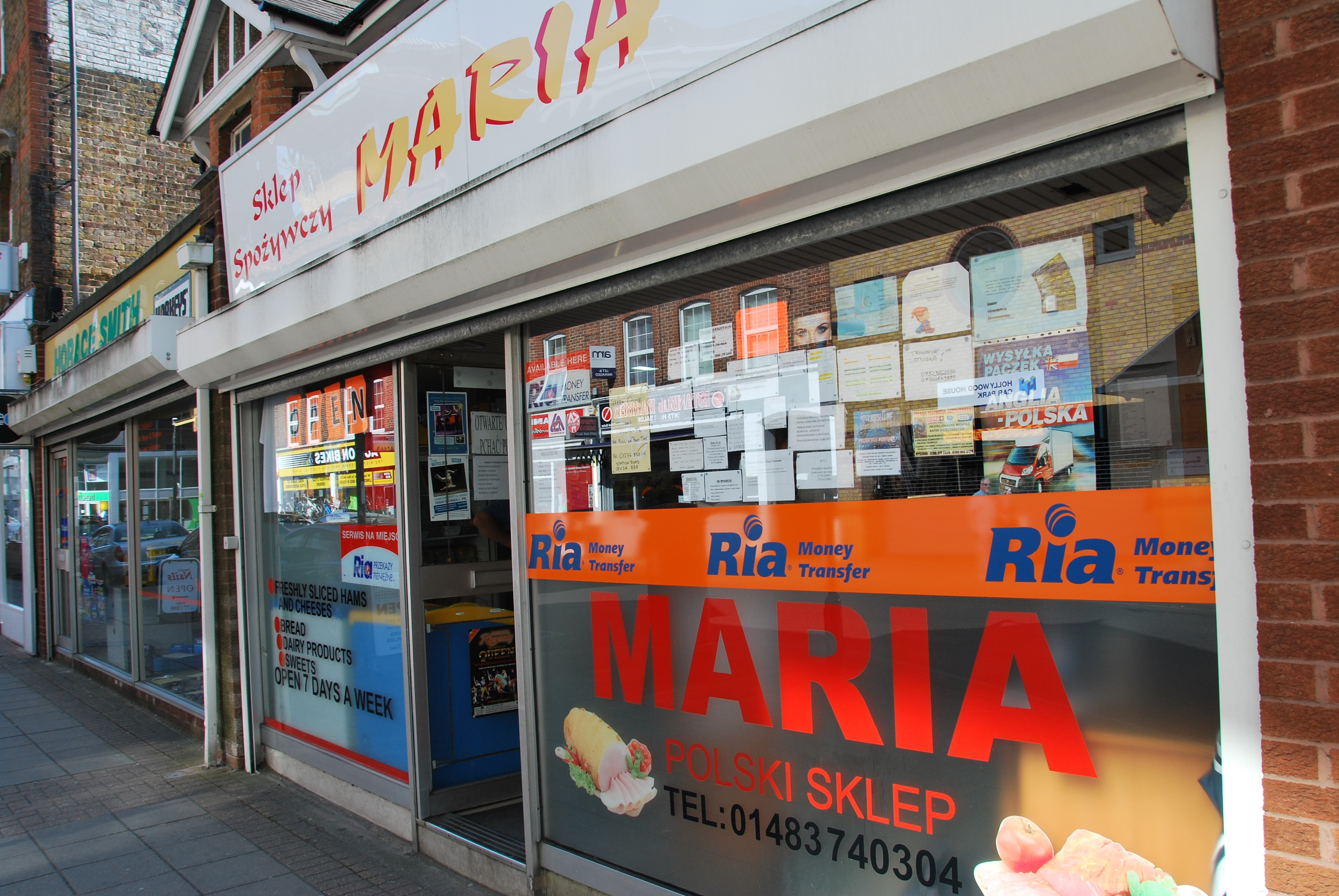
A Polish shop in Woking displaying adverts for services in its window, 2013

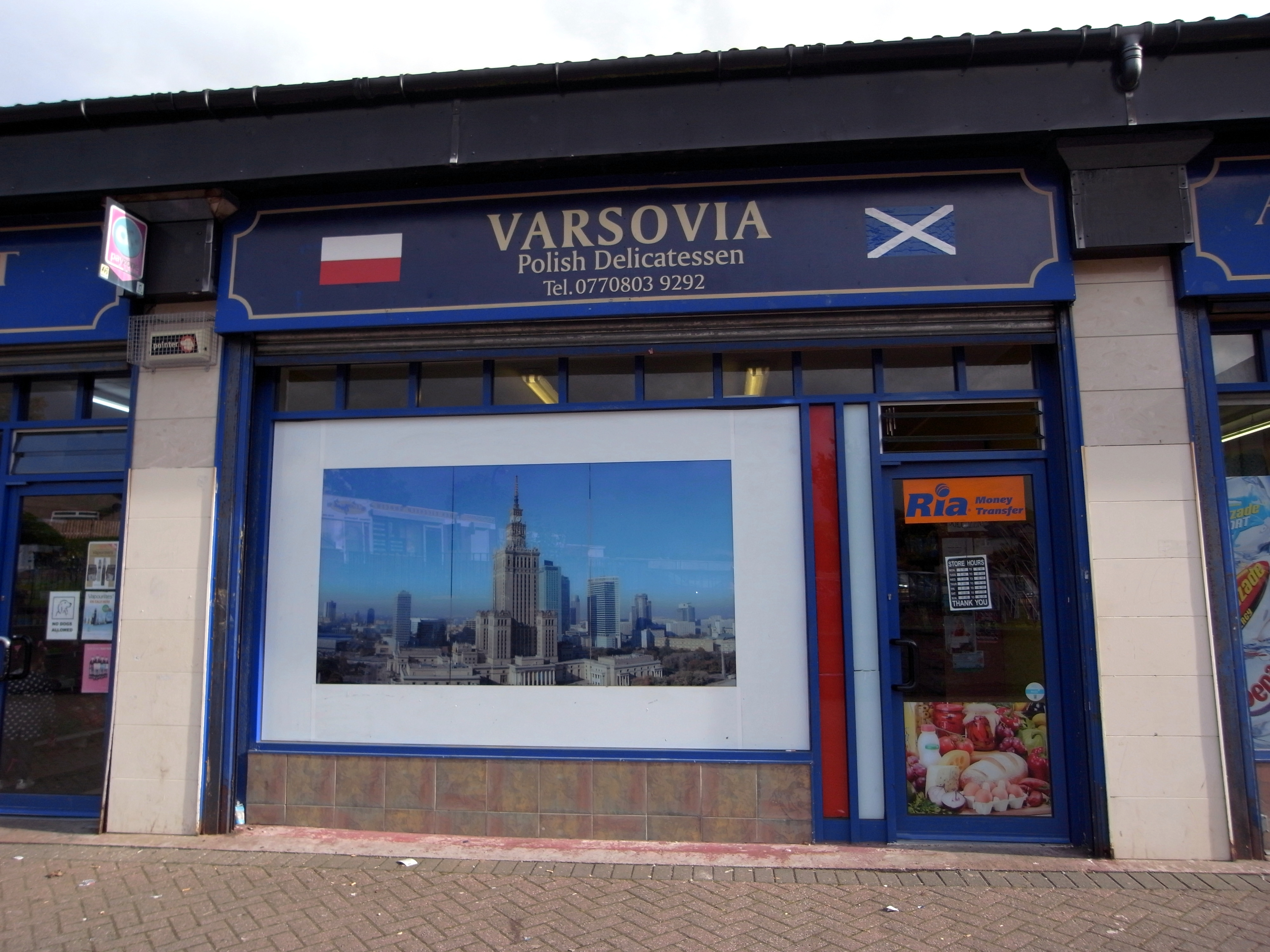
The Varsovia shop in Arden, Glasgow which incorporates the flag of Poland alongside the Saltire on its sign

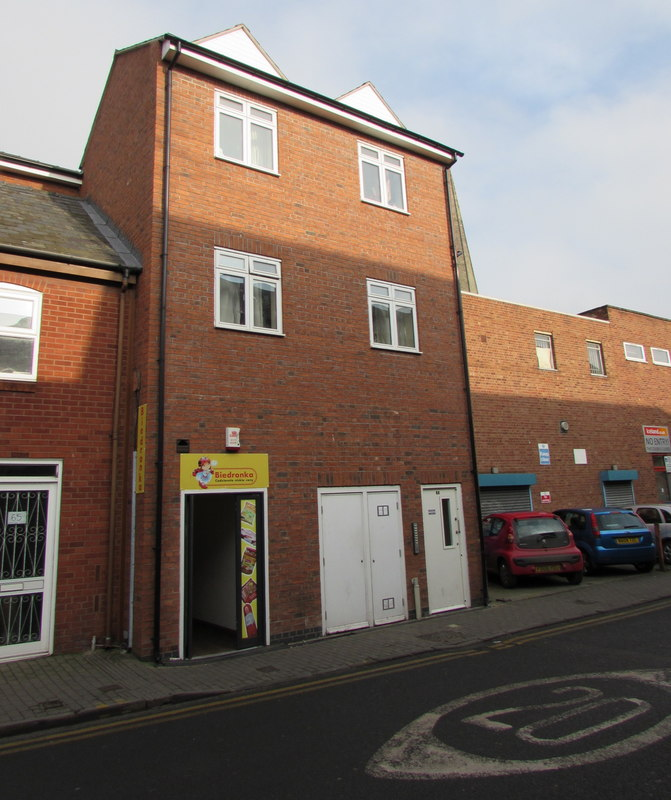
A shop named after the Polish retail chain Biedronka in Hereford

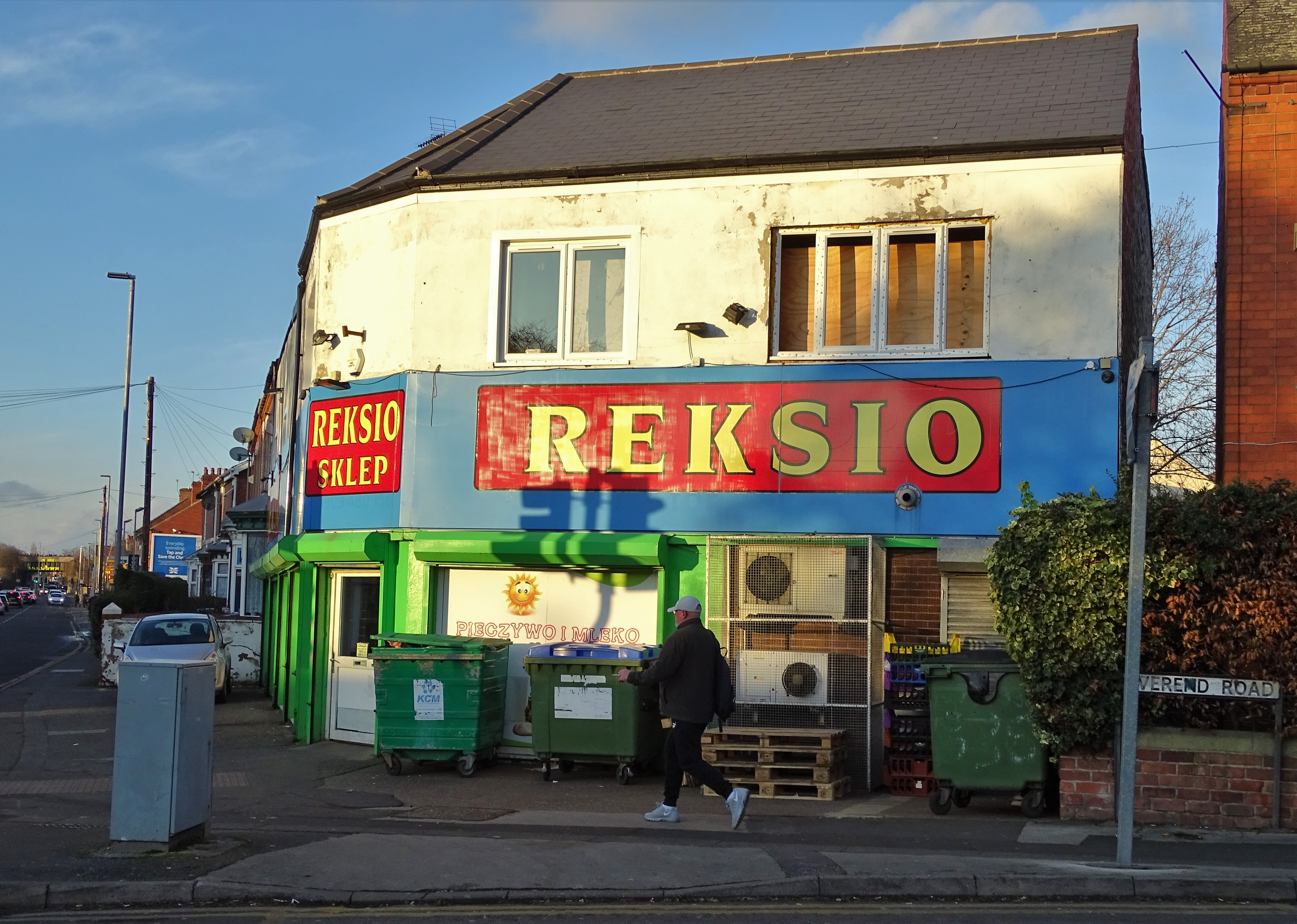
A Polish shop in Worksop named after the Polish cartoon character Reksio

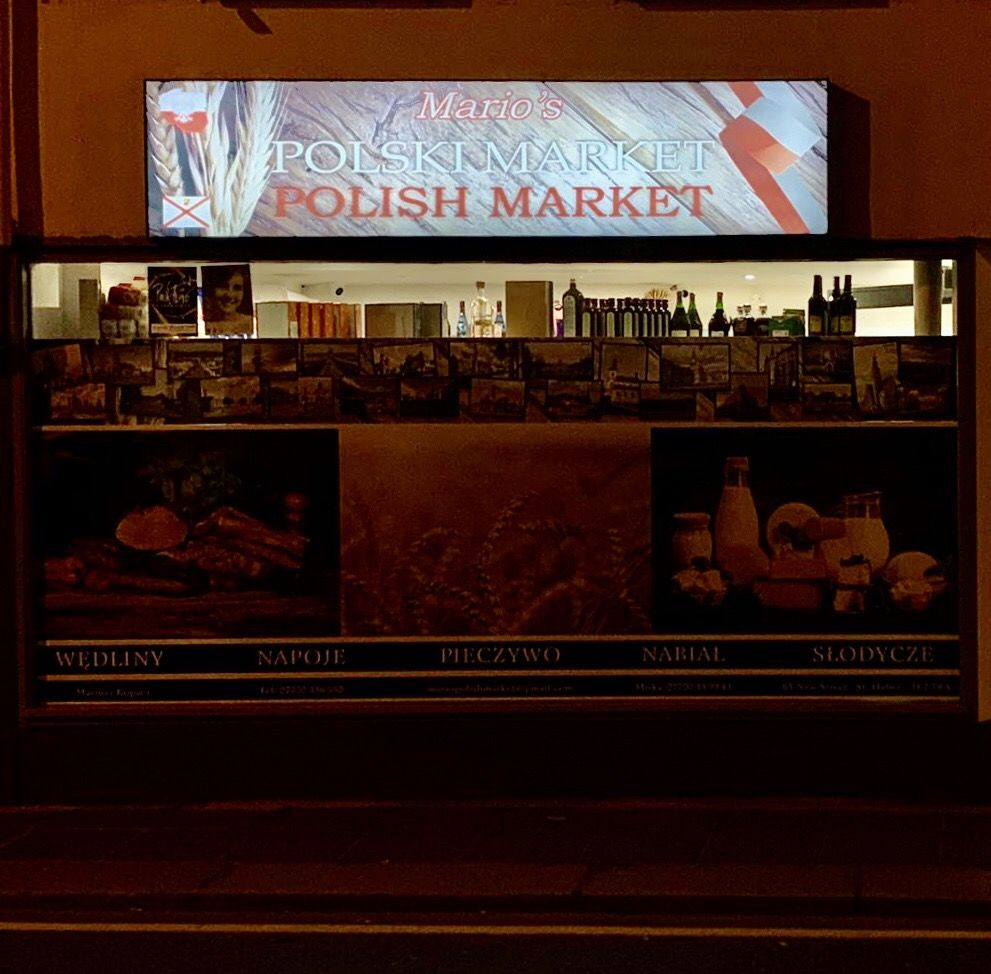
A Polish shop in St Helier, on the Channel Islands

== See also ==
- Corner shop
