= Simon Arora =

British billionaire businessman, and former CEO (born 1969)

- Born: November 1969 (age 56)
- Education: Cambridge University
- Occupation: Businessman
- Spouse: Shalni Arora
- Children: 2 daughters
- Relatives: Bobby Arora (brother); Robin Arora (brother)

Simon Arora (born November 1969) is a British billionaire businessman, and former CEO of the retail chain B&M.

== Early life ==
Simon Arora was born in November 1969 to Indian parents. His businessman father had emigrated to the UK from Delhi in the 1960s. He studied law at Fitzwilliam College, Cambridge, and worked at his father's cash and carry.

== Career ==
Arora worked as an analyst for McKinsey, 3i and Barclays.

In 1995, he went into business with his younger brother Bobby Arora, importing homewares from Asia and supplying them to UK retail chains, before buying B&M in 2004, which was then a struggling grocery chain based in Blackpool.

In 2017, Simon and Bobby Arora cashed in £215m of shares and reduced their stake in B&M by a quarter, three years after taking it public.

As of May 2019, the Arora brothers (Simon, Bobby and Robin) jointly have a net worth of £2.26 billion.

Arora stepped down as CEO of B&M in September 2022 following 17 years in the role. He remains an executive director at the company.

=== Covid-19 rates relief ===
In March 2020, as a result of the COVID-19 pandemic in the United Kingdom, Rishi Sunak, then Chancellor of the Exchequer, gave business rates relief and furlough payments to businesses in the hospitality and retail sectors. B&M was among several businesses classified as 'essential retailers' and as a result was allowed to remain open when other 'non-essential' businesses had to close. In November 2020, B&M and other retailers were subject to a public outcry for having not handed back payments totalling £1.8 billion intended for propping up retailers prevented from trading due to restrictions, despite making record profits. The retailer declared £296m in profit and as a result issued a £250m special dividend despite having received £38m in business rates relief and £3.7m in furlough payments. The Arora brothers received a combined total of £37m of the special dividend due to their 15% shareholding, which was said to be worth at least £750m. The firm agreed to pay £80m in business rate relief it had saved, a move mirrored by major supermarkets including Tesco, Sainsbury's and Morrisons.

== Personal life ==
He is married to Shalni Arora, who has a Natural Sciences degree from Cambridge University, and was a co-founder of bio-tech business DxS. They have two daughters.

Arora lives in Hale Barns near Altrincham, next door to his brother Bobby. Arora owns three of the flats at 3–10 Grosvenor Crescent, a Grade II* listed terrace in London's Belgravia district, where he unsuccessfully opposed a legal dispute about concierge services in 2017.

Arora donated £50,000 to the Conservative Party in early 2020.

== Awards ==
Simon Arora was honoured with the Lifetime Achievement Award at the Asian Achievers Awards for his leadership in the retail sector and his contribution to business growth and entrepreneurship.
