= Heron Foods =

English supermarket chain

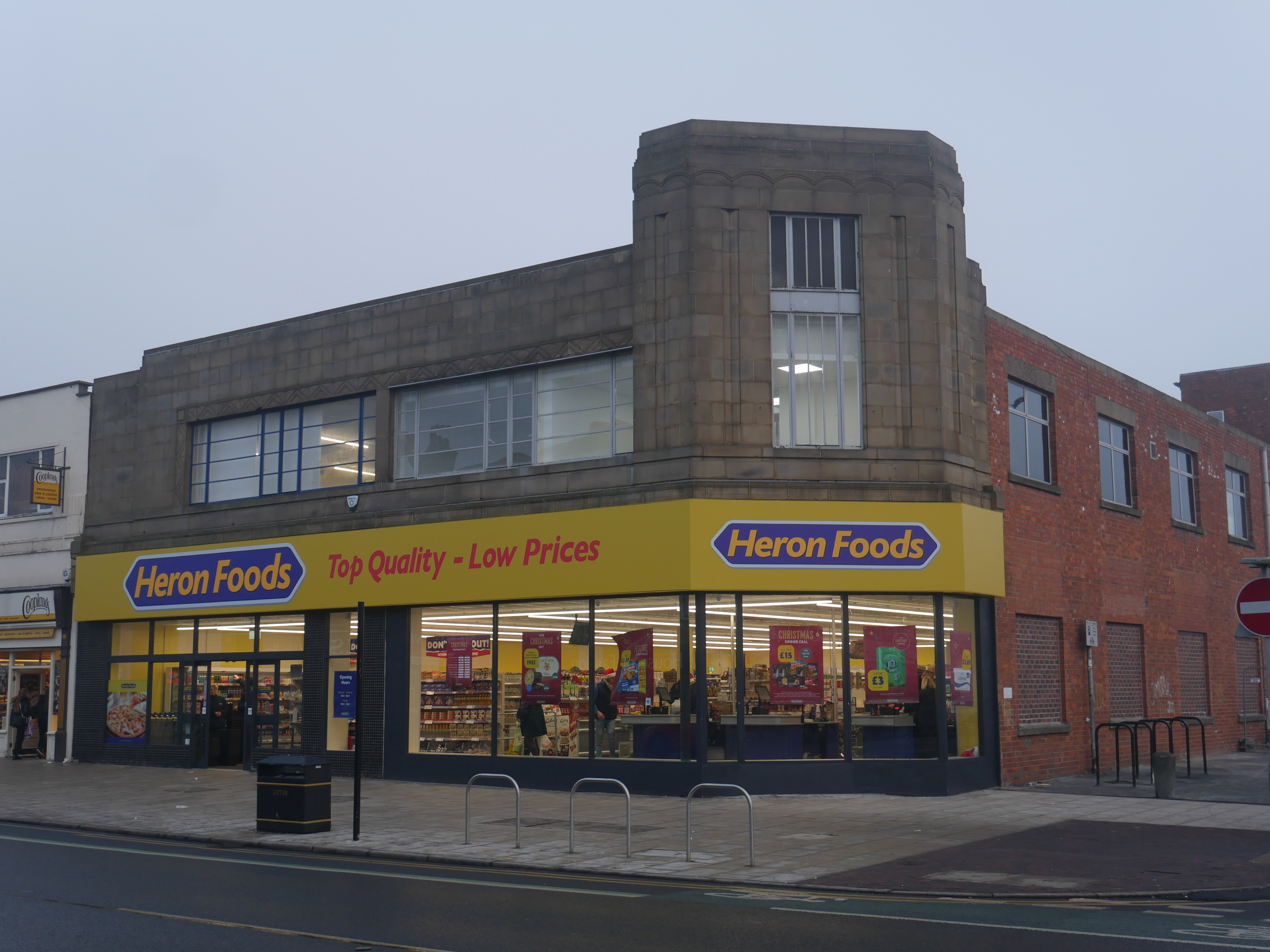
- Heron Foods on Holderness Road, Kingston upon Hull
- Type: Subsidiary
- Industry: Food retail
- Founded: 1979; 47 years ago Kingston upon Hull, England
- Founder: Malcolm Heuck
- Headquarters: Speke, England
- Number of locations: 343 (2024)
- Area served: England; Wales
- Revenue: ▲£194.7 million (2012)
- Operating income: ▼£6.7 million (2012)
- Net income: ▼£3.2 million (2012)
- Number of employees: 4,915 (2020)
- Parent: B&M
- Website: www.heronfoods.com

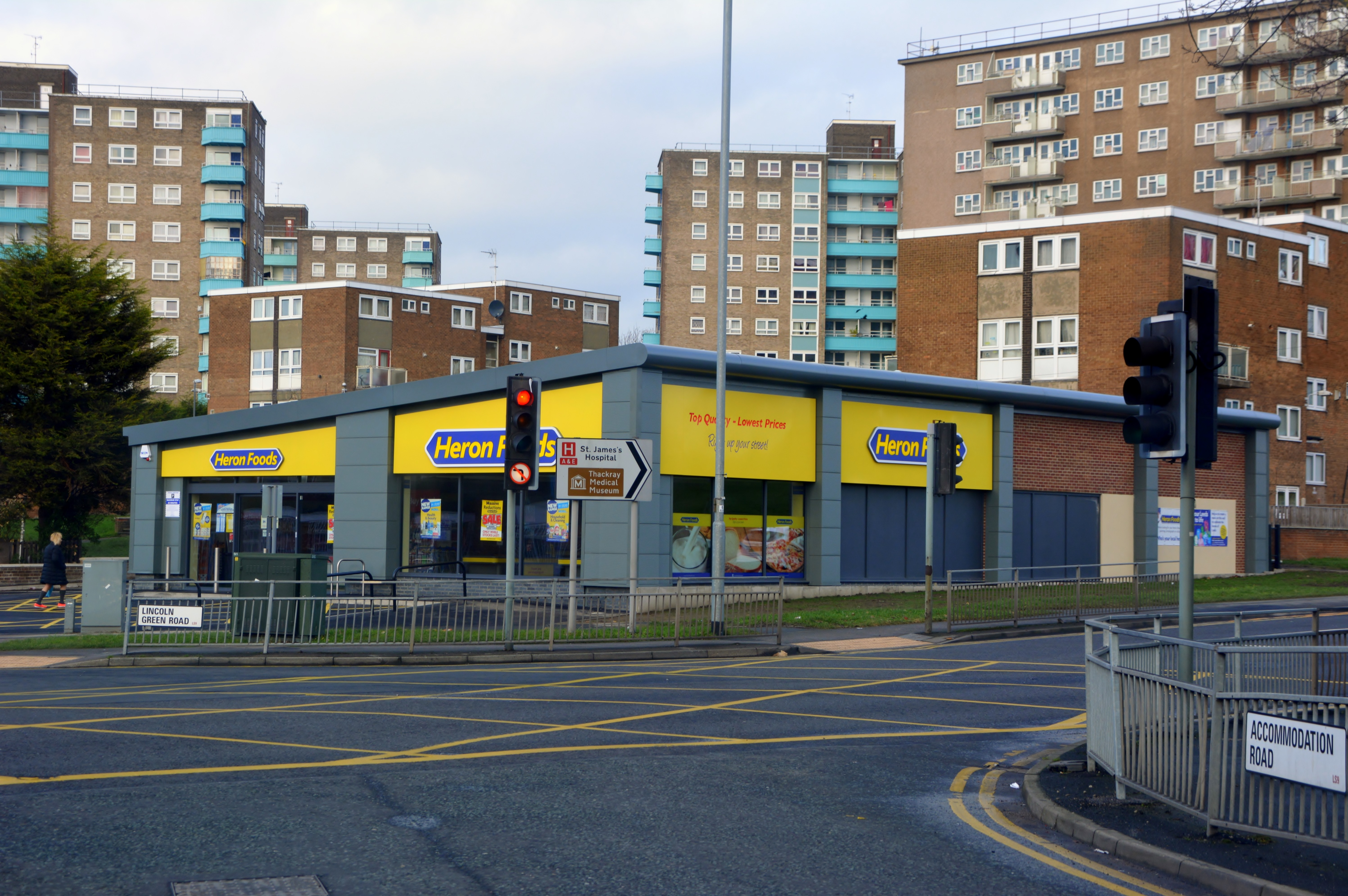
Heron Foods in Lincoln Green, Leeds. Branches are often situated in residential areas such as this.

Heron Foods Ltd. (formerly Heron Frozen Foods Ltd and Grindells Butchers Ltd) is an English supermarket chain founded in 1979 and based in Speke, England. As of October 2025, the company has 338 stores in Britain and primarily sells frozen food, but has a wide range of ambient and chilled stock with brands including Müller, Birds Eye and McCain Foods, as well as several lines using the Heron Foods brand. The company has been owned by B&M since August 2017.

== History ==
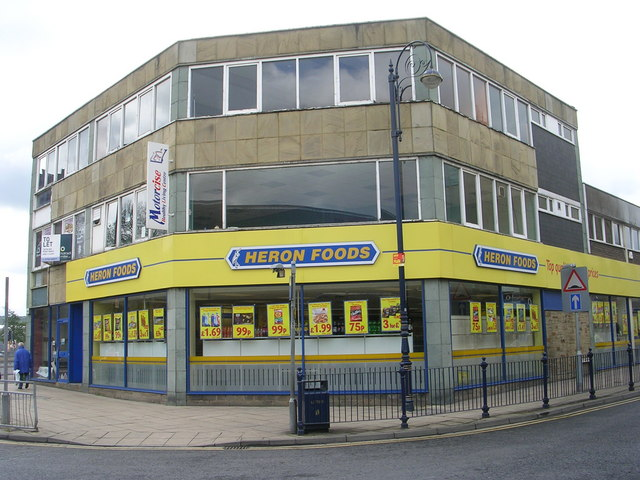
A branch showing the old logo.

The company was first registered in October 1978 as Grindells Butchers. The first store was opened by the Grindell family on Holderness Road, Hull in 1979.

In 1981 the company changed name to Heron Frozen Foods. Shortly after Anthony Grindell sold the business to his sister and her family – the Heucks.

In 1999 Heron Foods bought 17 Dawn Til Dusk convenience stores after that chain went into receivership, bringing its total number of stores to over 100. Malcolm and Sheila Heuck had a joint controlling interest in the company from the beginning, but in February 2003, having reached retirement age, they sold their stake to management; from that point, the company was run by their sons Andrew, David and Michael.

In September 2012 Heron Foods agreed to buy the Cooltrader frozen foods business from Iceland. The deal included 54 of the 58 shops and the depot and head office of Cooltrader. The acquired Cooltrader outlets were converted to the Heron Foods brand.

In August 2017, it was announced that Heron Foods had been sold to B&M for £152 million. A number of new branches have been opened under the new B&M Express facia.

== Operations ==
The company's head office is at Melton in the East Riding of Yorkshire and it has around 250 outlets which are mostly located throughout the North of England and the Midlands. Heron Foods has developed its business in selling frozen and convenience store goods at a discount, the majority of which are household brands. Heron occupies nine former Woolworth's locations.
