= Local Plus =

British retail company (2001–2004)

Local Plus (Conveco Ltd)
- Type: Private limited company
- Industry: Retail
- Predecessor: Alldays
- Founded: May 2001
- Defunct: May 2004
- Fate: Group brought by the Co-operative Group
- Headquarters: Long Ashton, Bristol
- Key people: Tony O'Neill (MD)

Local Plus was the trading name of a group of sixty four convenience stores trading in the South West of England, owned by Conveco Ltd, which was formed when three Alldays Regional Development companies were bought in a management buyout in 2001. In May 2004, the group was subsequently brought by the Co-operative Group.

== History ==
Conveco Limited was the group name but was in fact split into three smaller trading companies. Plymouth and Cornwall Convenience Stores Limited, Devon and Cornwall Convenience Stores Limited and Somerset and Bristol Convenience Stores Limited

Conveco was formed by a management buyout of the Alldays South West stores in 2001 by Allen Hutchby, Richard Tipper and Greg Gardener. The stores they acquired from Alldays were then rebranded to Local Plus, and supplied by Nisa. In November 2001, Conveco acquired four stores of Spar in Cornwall, then a further two a year later. These stores continued to trade and be supplied by Spar.

Conveco operated a total of sixty-four stores in Cornwall, Devon, Somerset and Bristol. The head office was located at the store in Long Ashton in Bristol.

In 2003 new management was brought in, to turn around the company's fortunes. The original CEO left, and troubleshooter Tony O'Neill was brought in. Subsequently, Conveco signed a new distribution deal with Spar, which saw the stores being supplied by Appleby Westward Limited in Saltash, Cornwall. Over the coming months most of the stores had their Local Plus fascias replaced with Spar fascias.

In the beginning of 2004, it was announced that the Co-operative Group had purchased Conveco outright. Co-op continued to trade the stores as Spar for a further six months, due to contracts that Conveco had signed with them. After this, the Conveco estate of stores was split up, with all the Plymouth and South Devon stores being sold into the Plymouth & South West Co-operative Society, and the rest retained by the Co-operative Group which now trades under the Co-op Welcome fascia.
