= B&M =

British variety retailer

B & M Retail Limited

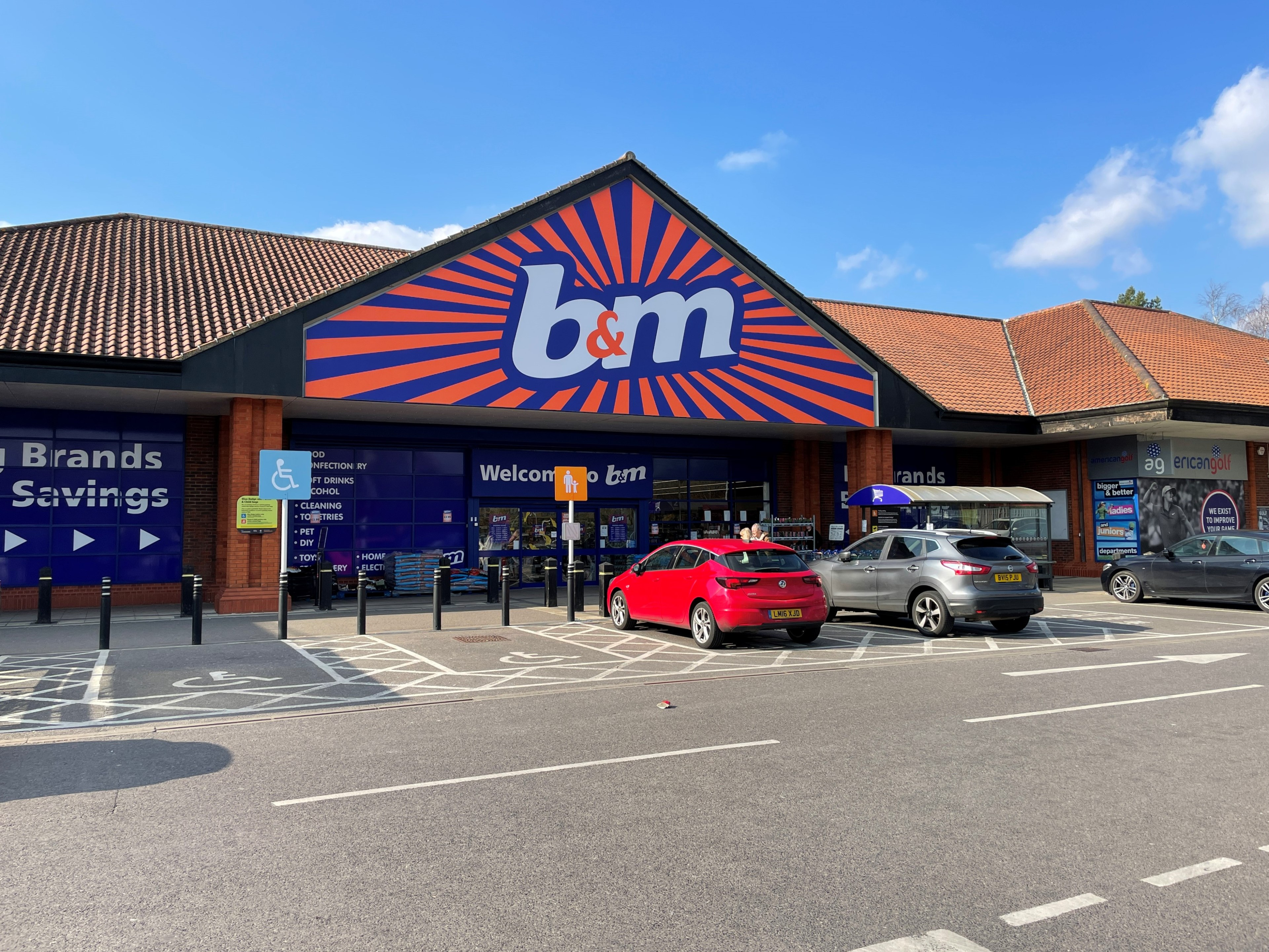
- A B&M store in Kempshott, Hampshire, England, UK
- Trade name: B&M
- Formerly: Faelex Limited (March–December 1978); B. & M. Bargains (W & R) Limited (1978–1997)
- Type: Public
- Traded as: LSE: BME; FTSE 250 component
- Industry: Retail
- Founded: 14 March 1978; 48 years ago
- Founder: Malcolm Billington; Brian Mayman
- Headquarters: Speke, Liverpool, England, UK
- Number of locations: 799 in the UK and 137 in France: total 946 stores (2026)
- Area served: United Kingdom; France
- Key people: Tiffany Hall (chairwoman); Tjeerd Jegen (CEO)
- Products: Grocery, variety
- Revenue: ▲£5,775 million (2026)
- Operating income: ▼£374 million (2026)
- Net income: ▼£164 million (2026)
- Owner: B&M European Value Retail plc
- Divisions: BMStores.co.uk
- Subsidiaries: B&M France; Heron Foods
- Website: Retail; Corporate

B & M Retail Limited, trading as B&M, is a British multinational variety store and garden centre chain founded in 1978 and based in Liverpool, England. It is listed on the London Stock Exchange, and is a constituent of the FTSE 250 Index. B&M is part of the Jersey-based B&M European Value Retail plc, which owns Heron Foods and operates the B&M (formerly Babou) stores in France.

== History ==
The business was founded by Malcolm Billington and Brian Mayman: the first store opened in Cleveleys, England, in 1978. It was originally named Billington & Mayman, based on the founders' names, but was soon shortened to "B&M". The company was the subject of a management buyout, financed by Phildrew Investments, in October 1996.

It was acquired by Simon and Bobby Arora from Phildrew Investments in December 2004.

In September 2006, the business saw significant growth, by acquiring the GlynWebb chain of Do It Yourself (DIY) stores and converting them into the B&M Home Store format. The company also acquired a number of former Kwik Save, Woolworths, and Au-Naturale stores.

The business moved into a new office and modern 620,000 sq ft (58,000 m^{2}) distribution centre based in Speke, Liverpool in 2010. In May 2011, B&M also purchased a number of Focus DIY stores.

In December 2012, Clayton, Dubilier & Rice, one of the world's leading private equity funds, acquired a significant stake in B&M, and Sir Terry Leahy and Vindi Banga joined the Board of Directors.

In March 2014, the business acquired a majority stake in German discount retailer Jawoll and then opened a new 500,000 sq ft distribution centre in Speke, Liverpool. In June 2014, the business was the subject of an initial public offering. However, upon detailed analysis by the Columbia Business School, it was found the IPO of B&M was overhyped due to an already saturated market in the UK.

In November 2014, the business opened its 400th store (in Stockport) and claimed to serve in excess of three million customers every week.

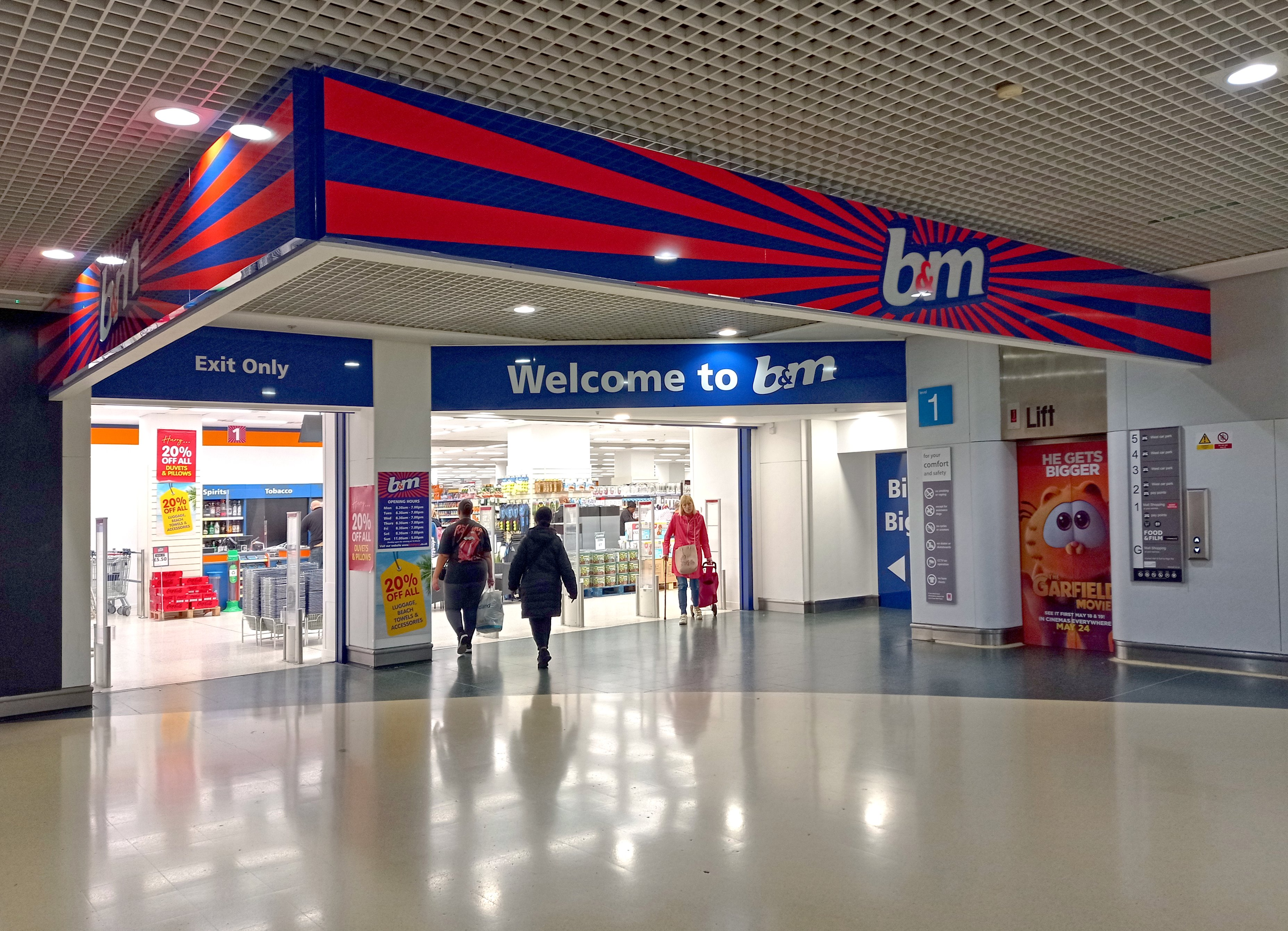
A B&M store in Wood Green shopping centre which replaced a Wilko store

During July 2017, the company completed the acquisition of the smaller frozen food store chain Heron Foods for £152 million. In 2018 the company started a trial of converting Heron Food branches to B&M Express.

As of 31 January 2018, B&M European Value Retail S.A. had issued 1,000,561,222 ordinary shares at the opening price of 10 pence.

In October 2018, the company acquired French discount retailer Babou for €91.2 million, and by the end of 2021, the Babou brand was replaced by B&M.

In September 2020, the company announced that it planned to open about 45 stores, offering everything from tinned and frozen meals to wallpaper and bedding plants, which had become a lockdown phenomenon.

On 4 February 2022, the company opened its 700th store at Border Retail Park in Wrexham.

In September 2022, Simon Arora stepped down as chief executive after 17 years in the role and was replaced by Alex Russo.

In September 2023, it was announced B&M had acquired 51 former Wilko stores from the administrator for £13 million.

In 2024, B&M became one of the bidders for the struggling Homebase alongside CDS Superstores. They later acquired some of the stores after Homebase collapsed into administration in November and opened them under B&M Home Store format.

In May 2024, the company announced the appointment of Tjeerd Jegen as its new chief executive following the retirement of Alex Russo in February 2025. Jegen will start from June 2025.

In October 2025, the company announced its chief finance officer, Mike Schmidt, will leave the company after it has appointed his successor.

== Controversy ==
=== Fire safety ===
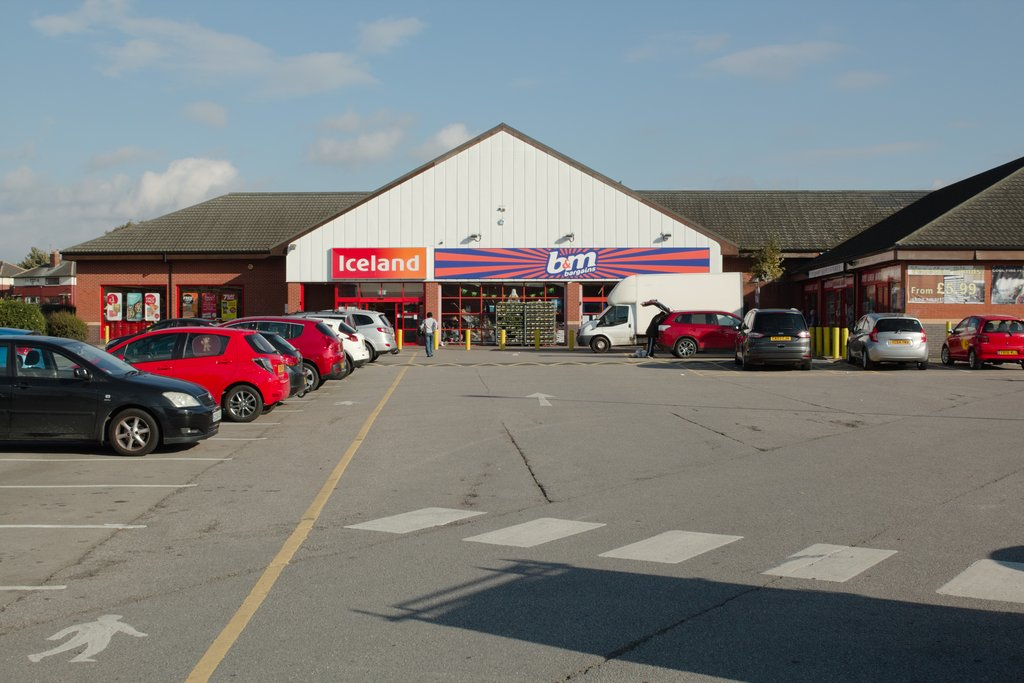
Iceland and B&M Store in Burmantofts, England, United Kingdom

In 2012, B&M pleaded guilty at Mansfield Magistrates Court to six fire safety offences under the Regulatory Reform (Fire Safety) Order 2005 following a visit from Fire Protection officers of the Nottinghamshire Fire and Rescue Service to their Mansfield store in October 2011. Officers had previously visited in June 2011 and found numerous breaches of the order, including blocked fire exits. However, the failings were found to have been repeated in the revisit and the firm was fined £32,984.17.

=== Underage sale of knives ===
In 2018, B&M was fined a record £480,000 by Barkingside Magistrates’ Court for selling knives to three children under the age of 18 in test purchases at stores in Redbridge and Barking. The fine was reduced from £720,000 as the business pleaded guilty.

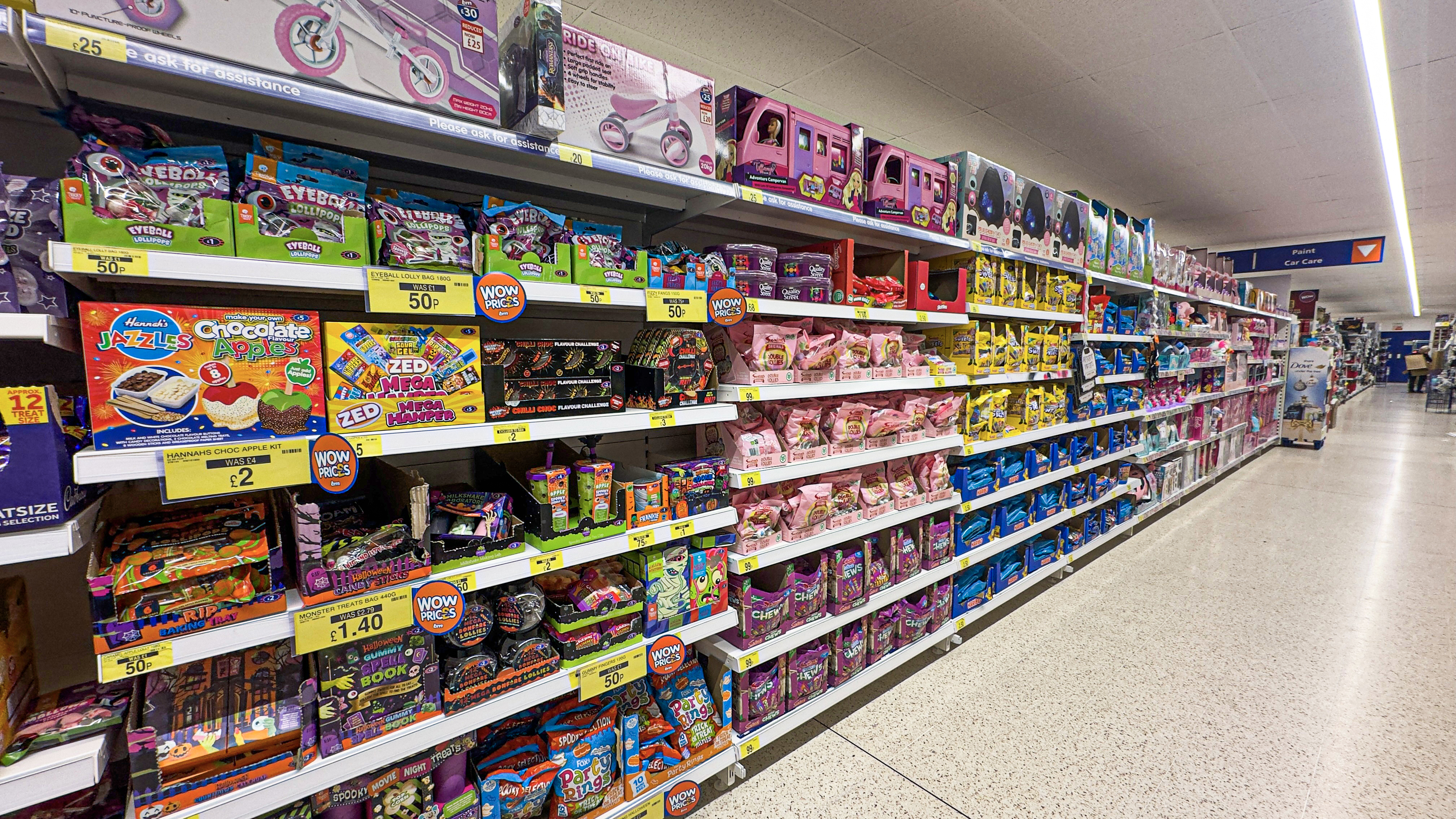
A typical layout of an aisle at a B&M store

=== COVID-19 rates relief controversy ===
In March 2020, as a result of the COVID-19 pandemic in the United Kingdom, Rishi Sunak, then Chancellor of the Exchequer, gave business rates relief and furlough payments to businesses in the hospitality and retail sectors. B&M was among several businesses classified as 'essential retailers' and as a result was allowed to remain open when other 'non-essential businesses had to close. In November 2020, B&M and other retailers were subject to a public outcry for having not handed back payments totalling £1.8 billion intended for propping up retailers prevented from trading due to restrictions, despite making record profits. The retailer declared £296 million in profit and as a result issued a £250 million special dividend despite having received £38 million in business rates relief and £3.7 million in furlough payments. Brothers Simon and Bobby Arora, the CEO and trading director respectively, received a combined total of £37 million of the special dividend due to their 15% shareholding which is said to be worth at least £750 million. The firm agreed to pay £80 million in business rate relief it had saved, a move mirrored by major supermarkets including Tesco, Sainsbury's and Morrisons.

=== Electrical safety ===
In July 2022, B&M was fined £1 million by the Health and Safety Executive after it was found to have failed in the appointment of a "suitably competent person" to plan and execute work connecting temporary generators at its warehouse in Liverpool. The failing resulted in an electrical explosion causing electrocution and bodily burns of an electrician working on the project.

== Operations ==
As of October 2025, B&M operates 764 stores in the UK and 129 stores in France. It also operates 338 Heron Foods stores in the UK.

Since September 2012, some stores have also been selling National Lottery goods.

== Financial performance ==
The financial performance has been as follows:

Year ending	Revenue (£ million)	Profit		
Year ending	Revenue (£ million)	Operating (£ million)	Pre-tax (£ million)	Retained (£ million)
28 March 2026	5,775.0	374.0	227.0	164.0
29 March 2025	5,571.0	566.0	431.0	319.0
30 March 2024	5,484.0	608.0	498.0	367.0
25 March 2023	4,983.0	536.0	436.0	348.0
26 March 2022	4,673.0	610.0	525.0	422.0
27 March 2021	4,801.4	613.4	525.4	428.1
31 March 2020	3,813.4	332.8	252.0	80.9
31 March 2019	3,486.3	264.4	249.4	202.7
31 March 2018	3,029.8	239.8	229.3	185.8
25 March 2017	2,430.7	204.5	182.9	144.0
26 March 2016	2,035.3	174.5	154.5	125.8
28 March 2015	1,646.8	132.9	61.7	39.9
29 March 2014 (65-week period)	1,509.1	123.5	123.4	115.9
31 December 2012	935.2	88.1	88.3	66.3
31 December 2011	712.6	52.0	51.7	38.0
31 December 2010	538.3	35.4	35.2	25.3
31 December 2009	426.6	34.0	33.8	24.5
