= Dawn Til Dusk =

- Company type: Public limited company
- Industry: Retail
- Predecessor: Dawn To Dusk
- Founded: 1986
- Defunct: 1999
- Fate: Liquidation
- Headquarters: Manchester, United Kingdom
- Number of locations: 90 convenience stores
- Area served: North of England
- Revenue: £33,430,000 (1998)
- Operating income: £6,670,000 (1998)
- Number of employees: 457 (1998)

Dawn Til Dusk was an English chain of 90 convenience stores located throughout the North of England. It was founded in 1986, and based in Sunderland, Liverpool and Manchester. The chain went into receivership in 1999. The chain blamed its closure on the bootlegging alcohol and cigarettes trade. Many outlets were taken over by Heron Foods and One Stop.

== History ==
The company was listed on AIM in November 1996. In August 1997 it acquired the Sunderland-based Milbank chain, doubling its number of stores to 80, and bringing it into the North East of England.
