= British Leyland UK Ltd v Swift =

UK labour law case

- Court: House of Lords
- Citation: [1981] IRLR 91

Keywords
- Unfair dismissal

British Leyland UK Ltd v Swift [1981] IRLR 91 is a UK labour law case, concerning unfair dismissal, now governed by the Employment Rights Act 1996.

== Facts ==
Mr. Swift was dismissed when one of the company's car's tax discs was found in his vehicle. He was later convicted of a crime, and the employer dismissed him. Mr. Swift claimed the dismissal was unfair.

The Tribunal found that Mr. Swift was guilty of gross misconduct but the dismissal was unfair because it was too severe a penalty considering years of good service.

== Judgment ==
Lord Denning MR held that the decision was perverse and would be reversed. He noted the tribunal said:

… a reasonable employer would, in our opinion, have considered that a lesser penalty was appropriate'. I do not think that that is the right test. The correct test is: Was it reasonable for the employers to dismiss him? If no reasonable employer would have dismissed him, then the dismissal was unfair. But if a reasonable employer might reasonably have dismissed him, then the dismissal was fair. It must be remembered that in all these cases there is a band of reasonableness, within which one employer might reasonably take one view: another quite reasonably take a different view.

However, Lord Denning MR said the Tribunal did not take into account the fact that Swift did not come clean when he was found out, and he lied about what he had done. A reasonable employer could have dismissed him.

== See also ==
- British Leyland Motor Corp. v. Armstrong Patents Co.
