= Alldays (supermarket) =

British convenience store chain

- Industry: Retail
- Predecessor: Watson & Philip
- Founded: 1994
- Defunct: October 2002
- Fate: Defunct - Purchased by Co-op Food operations and rebranded
- Headquarters: Eastleigh, England, UK
- Number of locations: 959
- Products: Groceries
- Owner: The Co-operative Group
- Number of employees: 10,500
- Parent: The Co-operative Food

Alldays was a chain of convenience stores in the UK, with a high density of stores in the south-east of England and in Scotland during the 1990s.

== Early history ==
It was founded by Watson & Philip, a Dundee-based convenience store and food distribution company, when they decided to move away from their previous contracts with the Spar and VG chains and instead focus on developing their own chain of stores. In February 1993, they bought the Circle K chain of around 200 stores from its American owners for £21m. In September 1995 under the leadership of the chief executive David Bremner, they launched the Alldays' brand and rebranded all the existing stores with ambitious plans to launch a further 100 new stores during 1996. Although they achieved this goal, in October 1996 the company had to post a profit warning, which was linked to the expansion of its foodservice division.

The company carried on with its rapid expansion of the chain, but sales growth was not keeping pace.

In 1997 Colin Glass took over as chief executive and managed to improve the company's like-for-like sales growth, during which a deal was struck with Total S.A. to put their stores in up to 250 of their petrol stations across the UK.

By the end of 1997 Alldays' had reached 759 stores, 300 of which were operated through a network of 31 regional development companies, where head franchisees would put up £100,000 of their own capital and could operate up to 40 stores in a given region with in return received additional financial backing from the group.

In 1998 they acquired a rival convenience store chain Walter Willson's, which had 48 stores located in the northeast of England and Scottish border region. Alongside that 152 new stores were added that year, bringing the total to 959.

== Restructuring ==
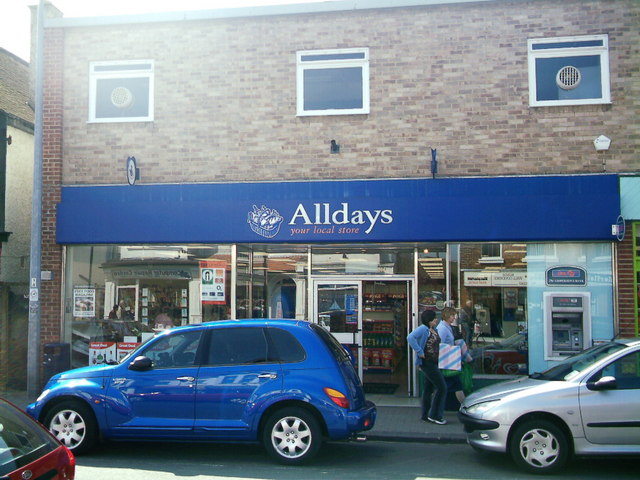
An AllDays in Lee-on-Solent in 2005

In October 1998 Watson & Philip sold its Foodservice catering supply business to Brake Bros, to focus almost exclusively on its Alldays convenience stores and they sought shareholder consent to change its name to Alldays at an extraordinary meeting on October 30. After its £38m disposal of W&P Foodservice, it was left with only the convenience stores chain and its the Trademarket cash-and-carry business.

In 2000, former Sainsbury's board director David Clapham was brought in as managing director of retail, but left the group after only a year. During his time there he introduced price promotions aimed at increasing sales volumes, but was unsuccessful contributing to a poor second half. Shares fell to a five-year low when the group, hit by the cost of buying back stores operated by its regional development companies, posted full-year pre-tax losses of £64m. In 2001 Alldays also sold 32 of its shops to rival Costcutter Supermarkets Group to reduce their borrowings.

== Sale ==
The chain effectively put itself up for sale in June 2002, when it reported an interim pre-tax loss of £4.6m, weighed down by its rising interest bill and The Co-operative Group acquired Alldays' core business in October 2002 for £131m.
