= David Sands =

Scottish convenience store chain

David Sands Ltd.
- Type: Private Limited
- Industry: Retail
- Founded: 1812
- Defunct: December 2012
- Fate: Sold to The Co-operative Group
- Headquarters: Kinross, Scotland, UK
- Number of locations: 28
- Key people: Lindsay Sands (Chairman); David Sands (Chief Executive); Ewen Chisholm (Chief Operating Officer); Stephen Brown (Development & Distribution Director)
- Products: Grocery
- Number of employees: 750

David Sands was a convenience shop chain located in Fife, Kinross and Perthshire, Scotland. At 200 years old, the family-owned enterprise had 28 outlets at its peak. According to a 2009 article on Business7, a publication of the Scottish Daily Record and Sunday Mail, the company was "a major employer across Fife and Perthshire." Its head office was located in Kinross.

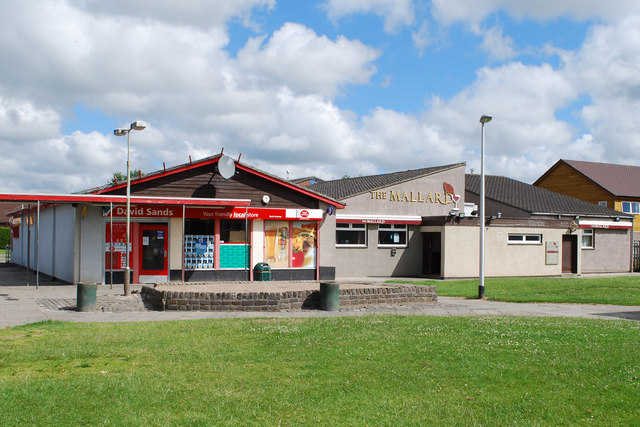
A David Sands store in Perth, pictured in 2010

On 10 January 2012 the company announced that it would be purchased by the Co-operative Group., the sale was approved by the Office of Fair Trading in April 2012, and by December 2012 the last David Sands shop was converted to a Co-operative, bringing to an end the company's 200-year existence. In October 2013 David Sands himself announced the launch of his new brand "David's Kitchen" the in-shop concept, used in the previous David Sands shops, for fresh hand made produce. David's Kitchen will trade under the Nisa brand. The first shop will open on Caskieberran Road in Glenrothes. The site was a derelict Pub which was demolished, and David's Kitchen building a brand new purpose-built modern building.

== History ==
The business was founded as a grocery in 1812 by Joseph Hardie. In 1846, the business was inherited by Hardie's nephew, David Sands. Sands had some difficulty finding among his sons a successor, but in 1920 the business passed to David Sands' son, Davee Sands. In 1966, Davee Sands' son David Lindsey took over the business, being joined in 1989 by his son David Sands. At that time, the business consisted of a single convenience shop in Kinross, but it soon expanded with additional outlets and services. By May 2006, it was a retail chain employing more than 450 people. In August 2008, at which point the enterprise had 26 outlets through Fife, Kinross and Perthshire, the chain brought in Ewen Chisholm as chief operating officer, expanding the management of the company beyond family for the first time.
