= Iceland Frozen Foods Ltd v Jones =

UK labour law case

- Court: Employment Appeal Tribunal
- Citation: [1983] ICR 17

Keywords
- Unfair dismissal

Iceland Frozen Foods Ltd v Jones [1983] ICR 17 is a UK labour law case, concerning unfair dismissal, now governed by the Employment Rights Act 1996.

== Facts ==
Mr Jones was summarily dismissed for failing to lock a door, and taking part in a ‘go slow’ shift while on security duties. Mr Jones claimed it was unfair. The employer contended it was justified.

== Judgment ==
Browne-Wilkinson J remitted the case to tribunal with the observation that the haste of the dismissal was probably unwise. In interpreting what is or is not fair, the following should be considered.

(1) the starting point should always be the words of section 98(4) themselves;

(2) in applying the section an industrial tribunal must consider the reasonableness of the employer's conduct, not simply whether they (the members of the industrial tribunal) consider the dismissal to be fair;

(3) in judging the reasonableness of the employer’s conduct an Industrial tribunal must not substitute its decision as to what was the right course to adopt for that of the employer;

(4) in many (though not all) cases there is a band of reasonable responses to the employee conduct within which one employer might reasonably take one view, another quite reasonably take another;

(5) the function of the industrial tribunal, as an industrial jury, is to determine whether in the particular circumstances of each case the decision to dismiss the employee fell within the band of reasonable responses which a reasonable employer might have adopted. If the dismissal falls within the band the dismissal is fair: if the dismissal falls outside the band it is unfair.

== See also ==
- UK labour law
- Iceland was approved by the Court of Appeal in Gilham v Kent CC (No 2) [1985] ICR 233, Neale v Hereford & Worcester CC [1986] ICR 471, Campion v Hamworthy Engineering Ltd [1987] ICR 966 and Morgan v Electrolux [1991] ICR 369.
