= List of supermarket chains in Ireland =

The following is a list of supermarket chains in Ireland.

== Large supermarkets ==
Name	Stores	Parent
SuperValu	223	Musgrave Group
Lidl	173	Lidl Stiftung & Co. KG (Schwarz Gruppe)
Tesco Ireland	164	Tesco
Aldi	153	Aldi Süd
Dunnes Stores	118	Dunnes Stores
Eurospar	60	BWG Foods
Marks & Spencer	19	Marks & Spencer
Donnybrook Fair	6	Musgrave Group
Fresh	10	Fresh

== Smaller supermarkets and convenience stores ==
Name	Stores	Parent
Centra	483	Musgrave Group
Spar	456	BWG Foods
XL Stores	250	BWG Foods
Gala	200	H. Murphy & Co, Enniscorthy/ M&P O'Sullivan, Cork (city) / C. Clifford & Sons,Tralee Perry's Cash & Carry, Carlow /BWG Foods
Mace	160	BWG Foods
Londis	140	BWG Foods
Daybreak	200	Musgrave Group
Costcutter	120	James A. Barry and Co

== Defunct supermarket chains ==
These supermarkets are either no longer trading, have been renamed, or have been taken over and rebranded.

- Iceland Operated from 1996 to 2005 when all six stores closed due to financial issues. Iceland stores reopened in 2008. However in June 2023, Metron Stores, trading as Iceland, was ordered to recall all imported meat products by the Food Safety Authority of Ireland, due to traceability concerns. In the same month, Metron said it was insolvent and unable to pay debts, abruptly closing all 27 Irish stores.
- Joyce's operated from 1951 to 2023. On 30 November 2021, Tesco Ireland announced it had purchased all Joyce's supermarkets for an undisclosed amount, with the shops beginning to be rebranded as Tesco in 2022.
- Quinnsworth Operated from 1966 to 2001, with approximately one quarter of the grocery market in the Republic of Ireland, and some 88 supermarkets across the island of Ireland, including its Crazy Prices brand operated at some of its larger outlets. It was acquired by UK chain Tesco in 1997, with its supermarkets being gradually rebranded as Tesco Ireland over the following four years.
- Superquinn Operated from 1960 to 2014. A receiver was appointed to the company on 18 July 2011, and the following day the company was bought by Musgrave Group for an undisclosed sum. On 13 February 2014 all remaining units were rebranded as SuperValu.
