= Retail in the Republic of Ireland =

Part of the economy of the Republic of Ireland

In Ireland, the retail sector provides one of the largest sources of employment in the economy, representing over 12% of the workforce. As of 2017, approximately 40,000 wholesale and retail businesses employed almost 280,000 people in Ireland, with the Department of Enterprise, Trade and Employment reporting that 90% of these businesses were Irish-owned.

As of 2017, the retail market was worth €40 billion annually, with the supermarket sector reportedly comprising €9 billion of this figure. For the same period, €5 billion was spent by Irish consumers with online retailers - €3 billion of this going to non-Irish sites.

== Supermarkets ==
Ireland has a number of supermarket chains. As of 2018, SuperValu had over 220 stores and the largest share of Ireland's grocery market at 22.3%. Dunnes Stores, owned by a trust consisting of members of the family of its founder, Ben Dunne Snr, had 123 stores and 21.9% market share in 2018. In the same period Tesco Ireland, a subsidiary of Tesco plc, had 91 stores and 22.2% of the market. Aldi and Lidl each had, as of May 2018, approximately an 11% share of the grocery market. By early 2025, Dunnes Stores reportedly had the largest share of the market (at 25%), followed by Tesco (24.1%), SuperValu (20.3%), Lidl (12.4%) and Aldi (10.7%).

As of 2017, SuperValu and Tesco both had a significant online business. During the COVID-19 pandemic, Dunnes Stores also introduced online shopping and home delivery services.

Marks and Spencer operates a small number of supermarket sites, including in Cork and Dublin.

SPAR and Londis have a number of supermarket format franchise stores, with their Eurospar and Londis Plus formats.

While there is much competition in the supermarket sector, it was formerly tempered by the Restrictive Practices (Groceries) Order 1987 (known as the "Groceries Order"). This order made it illegal to sell any good below the invoice price. The order was instituted to prevent a price war along the lines which led to the collapse of the supermarket chain H Williams in 1987, and banned cross-subsidy and loss leaders. In 2005, Micheál Martin, the Minister for Enterprise, Trade and Employment announced that the Order would be revoked in early 2006. This was done via the enactment of the Competition (Amendment) Act 2006 in March 2006.

== Convenience stores and newsagents ==
Convenience store formats were developed from the 1960s, when the Musgrave Group introduced the "VG" convenience store format in 1960. This became Centra (and SuperValu) in 1979. Other convenience store formats include Gala, owned by 9 independent wholesale companies, Costcutter owned by Barry Group, SPAR, Mace, and Londis, all three owned by BWG in Ireland. Smaller convenience store formats include XL Stop and Shop, Your Stop, Daybreak, Quik Pick and Vivo. Stonehouse Marketing, a large buying group of wholesalers, offers their retailers the Homestead brand, which is the main "own brand" label offered in symbol groups such as Gala, Costcutter, Quik Pick and Your Stop.

Tesco also operates a small number of Tesco Express stores, and Marks and Spencer operates several smaller convenience stores under the Simply Food banner.

The Eason chain of main street newsagents, stationers and booksellers is the largest in the country.

The main petrol station brands in Ireland also operate convenience stores - including the Circle K and Applegreen brands.

== Main street retailing ==
While main street retailing is declining, a number of British and European 'high street' brands continue to operate in the market. These include Next, River Island, Boots, JD, Superdrug, Currys, and a number of stores in the Inditex and Bestseller brand families (such as Zara, Vero Moda and Jack & Jones). US retailer TK Maxx has more than 20 stores in Ireland. Indigenous Irish retailers and brands include Penneys, Brown Thomas, Shaws, newsagents Eason & Son, record stores Golden Discs, pharmacy chains Hickey's, Sam McCauley's, and McCabes, and other smaller chains.

== Shopping centres ==
Out-of-town shopping centres, anchored by a major supermarket, have been developed in Ireland since the 1960s, with Dunnes Stores' Cornelscourt being one of the first. A precursor of the 1990s town centres was developed in Stillorgan in the late 1960s, as well as the two major Dublin city centre shopping malls, the Ilac Shopping Centre and Irish Life Shopping Mall. These were joined in the 1990s by the Jervis Centre.

However, in the 1990s a new phenomenon of large shopping malls, not dominated by one tenant but with a number of anchor tenants, main street names, and usually a cinema, grew up in the Dublin suburbs. Of these types of shopping centre developments around Dublin, the five largest include The Square Tallaght, Blanchardstown Centre, Liffey Valley Shopping Centre, Swords Pavilions and Dundrum Town Centre.

In Munster and Connacht, shopping centres have also emerged on the outskirts of towns and cities like Cork, Limerick, Galway, and Waterford. These include sites like Mahon Point in Cork and the Crescent Shopping Centre in Limerick.

== See also ==
- Economy of the Republic of Ireland
- Celtic Tiger
