= Top Oil =

Irish petrol company

Tedcastle Oil Products Unlimited Company
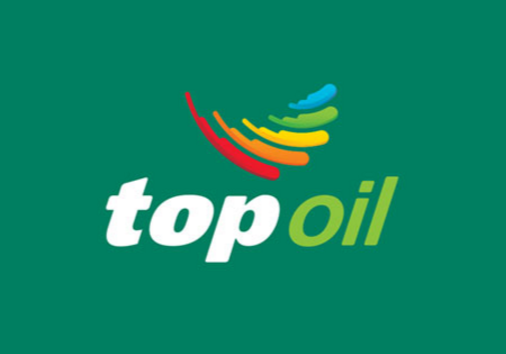
- The current logo, in use since 1996
- Company type: Unlimited company
- Industry: Fuel
- Founded: 22 March 1960
- Area served: Ireland
- Products: Petrochemical
- Owner: Irving Oil
- Website: www.top.ie

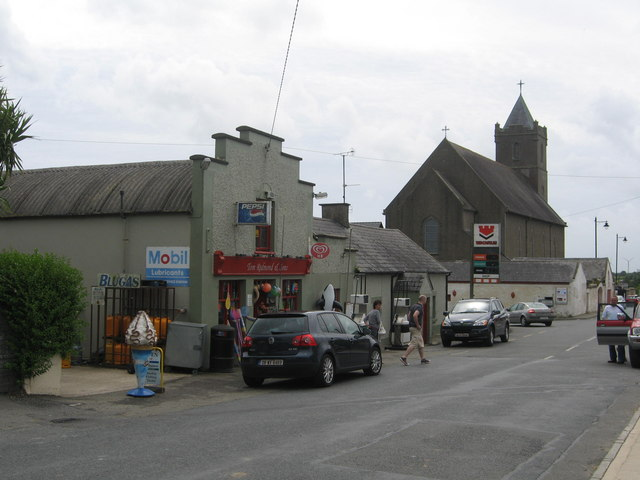
Top Oil petrol station in Ballygarrett, Co Wexford in 2009 with the old Tedcastle's Oil logo

Top Oil (formally Tedcastles Oil Products Unlimited Company) is an Irish-based petrol company founded in 1960 which trades under the brand name "Top". Before a rebranding in 1998, the company variously traded as "Tedcastles Oil Products", "Tedcastles Oil", "Tedcastles" and "T.O.P.", and prior to that as "Tedcastle McCormick". Top Oil is a medium-sized Irish distributor of petroleum fuels.

== History ==
The business was founded by Robert Tedcastle as a coal merchant in 1800, later diversifying in the heating business and entering the petroleum business. It was subsequently renamed as Tedcastle and McCormick, then Tedcastle, McCormick and Co. Ltd., and then Tedcastles Oil Products.

In 1926, the business became an associate company of the Coast Lines group. It established branches in Clonmel, Cork, Foynes, Limerick, Newcastle West and Waterford. In 1950, it returned to private ownership, with John P Reihill as chair. In the 1950s and early 1960s, it opened branches in Belfast, Dundalk and Sligo.

In the late 20th century, the business variously traded as "Tedcastles Oil Products", "Tedcastles Oil", "Tedcastles" and "T.O.P.". In 1998, it underwent a rebrand as "Top Oil" with a green colour scheme that has changed little since.

The Tedcastle Group was acquired by Irving Oil of Canada in 2018.

== Petrol stations ==
The company operates petrol stations mainly outside Dublin. It has over 205 locations nationwide ( 25 of them are company owned). In 2010, Top Oil acquired a fuel company in Galway called Sweeney Oil, out of receivership for a nominal purchase price. Top Oil have grown in recent years through vulture purchasing of distressed oil companies from bank receivership, examples including Tougher Oil in Kildare and Sweeney Oil in Galway. In late 2010, Top Oil's 6 separate sites were finally opened along the Galway motorway, which are all in alliance with Applegreen. In 2012, the brand was changed to Top Oil – Fueling Ireland and in 2016, the company re-entered the forecourt shop sector with the acquisition of 10 company owned locations.

== Convenience stores ==
From 1998 to 2004, the company operated a convenience store chain on a franchise basis with ADM Londis. These stores were known as "Londis Topshop". This allowed forecourts to become franchisees of both Londis and Top at once. However it also had high street stores in competition with ADM Londis itself. In 2004, the stores were acquired by ADM and rebranded to simply Londis.

In 2018, Top Oil works in partnership with a number of retailers across their network including SPAR, Mace and Daybreak.

== Competition ==
Top Oil's main competition comes from Maxol, Certa, Texaco and Circle K.
