= Insomnia Coffee Company =

Irish coffee chain

- Industry: Coffee Company
- Founded: 1997 (Ireland)
- Headquarters: Dublin, Ireland
- Key people: John Clohisey (Chairman), Harry O Kelly (CEO)
- Revenue: €36.77m (2019) €30.9 million (2018) €28.7 million (2017)
- Owner: Insomnia Ltd
- Parent: BHJ Holdings
- Website: www.insomnia.ie

Insomnia Coffee Company is an Irish chain of coffee shops, with headquarters in Dublin. Its first location opened in the back of a Galway bookshop in August 1997. The company has over 150 cafés and over 400 self-service units in operation around Ireland. Insomnia outlets serve both hot and cold drinks, coffee, sandwiches, salads, soups, snacks, cakes, and pastries.

== History ==
Insomnia has grown from a single location in an Eason & Son bookshop in Galway in 1997 to an estate of over 150 coffee shops with both directly-owned and franchised outlets, and through partnerships with SPAR/Eurospar, Mace and Londis as well as other Irish retailers such as Eason & Son, Fresh, Meadows & Byrne, Maxol and Penneys.

In 2003, the company merged with the sandwich company Bendini & Shaw. In 2005, Insomnia acquired the Perk coffee chain.

From 2006-2017, the company was equally owned by chairman Bobby Kerr, CEO Harry O’Kelly, and John Clohisey. In 2010, O'Kelly was appointed CEO and Kerr became chairman. In December 2017, Kerr left the business and sold his shares to the other shareholders. That same month, Clohisey became chairman, CFO Barry Kehoe joined the Board of Directors, and Dara O'Flynn joined as COO.

In April 2012, the Insomnia high street franchise was launched. The first franchise café opened in 2013 in St Stephen's Green Shopping Centre, Dublin. In 2015, the company announced a new partnership with Primark, an Irish-based retail chain, which trades in Ireland as Penneys. In 2015, three Insomnia concession cafés were rolled out at Penneys in Waterford, Swords and Athlone, with Liffey Valley opening in 2016.

In 2015, Insomnia expanded to the United Kingdom, with a café opening in Market Harborough. It continued to expand in 2016, opening three more UK cafés in Calver, Laceby and Bromley, which was the first of seven cafés in partnership with Primark. As of September 2022, Insomnia has over 100 cafés in the UK, having most recently opened an outlet in Eastham, Wirral in 2022, in partnership with the Central England Co-operative.

In 2016, a new franchise partnership developed between Insomnia and Maxol, which saw the first outlet opening in Mulhuddart Service Station in April 2016. In 2018, Insomnia's first coffee drive-thru opened in partnership with Maxol at Maxol Ballycoolin in the heart of the Dublin Enterprise Zone.

== Products ==
Insomnia offers a range of beverages, including tea, coffee and hot chocolate. It also offers food options, including sandwiches, filled baguettes, panini, focaccia, flatbreads, wraps, ciabattas, salads and soups.

== See also ==
- List of coffeehouse chains
