= Londis (United Kingdom) =

Chain of convenience stores

- Logo used since 2009

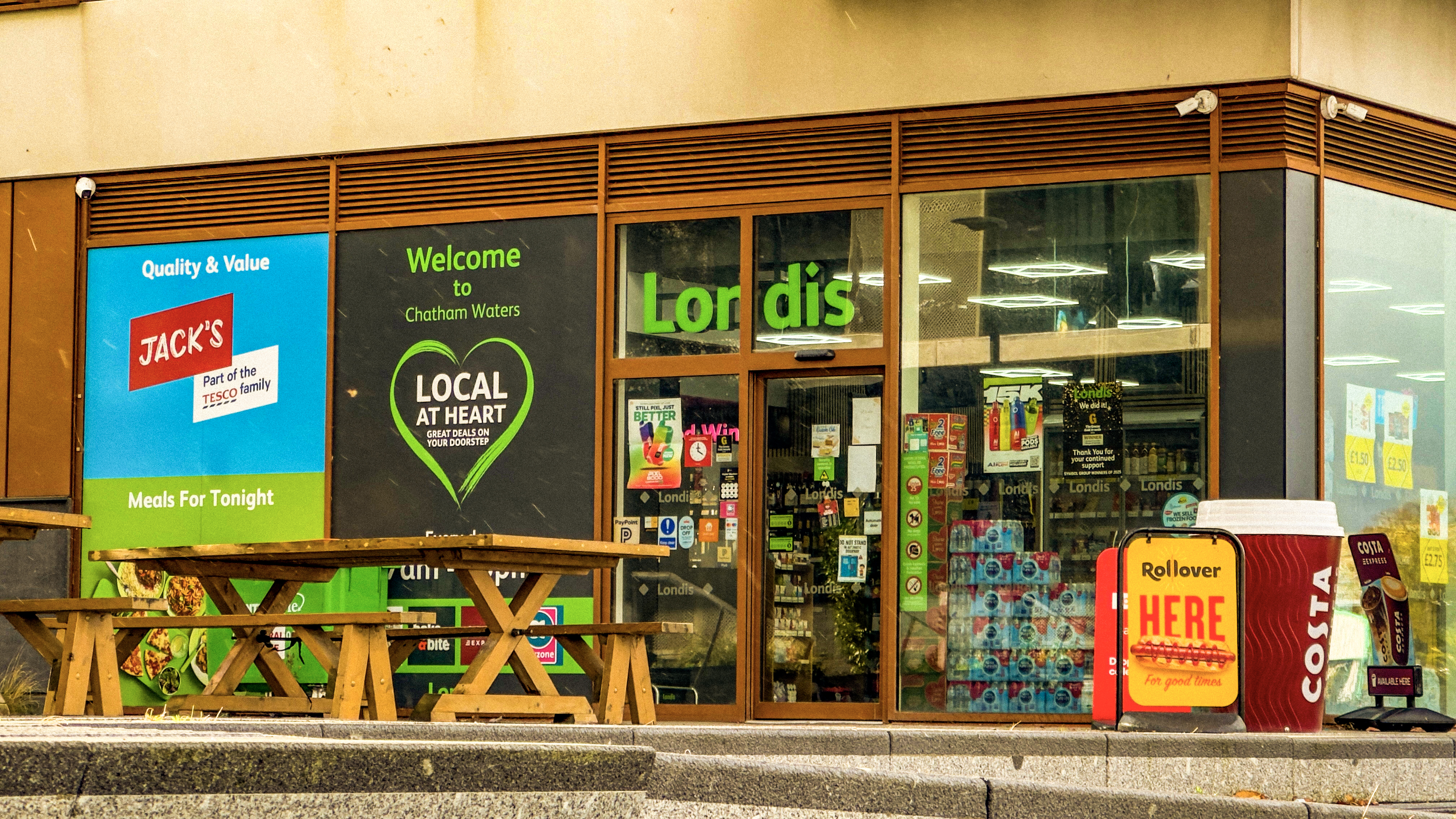
- A Londis outlet in Chatham Waters, Kent in 2025
- Type: Private
- Industry: Retail
- Founded: 1959
- Number of locations: 1,833 (2024)
- Area served: United Kingdom
- Products: Groceries
- Parent: Tesco (via Booker Group)
- Website: londis.co.uk

Londis is a British chain of convenience stores operating as a symbol group in the United Kingdom with over 2,400 stores nationwide. Founded in 1959, the brand serves as a voluntary wholesaler and chain for independent retailers. Since 2018, it has been a subsidiary of Tesco PLC following the acquisition of its parent company, Booker Group. Although it was formerly a subsidiary, the Londis brand in Ireland is no longer related to Londis (UK).

== History ==
The name Londis is taken from “London District Stores”, combining parts of “London” and “district” into a shorter, more convenient form.

=== Foundation ===
The brand was founded in 1959 by Kevin Stanley-Adams and John Leach as a communally owned company, with each retailer owning a share in the parent company.

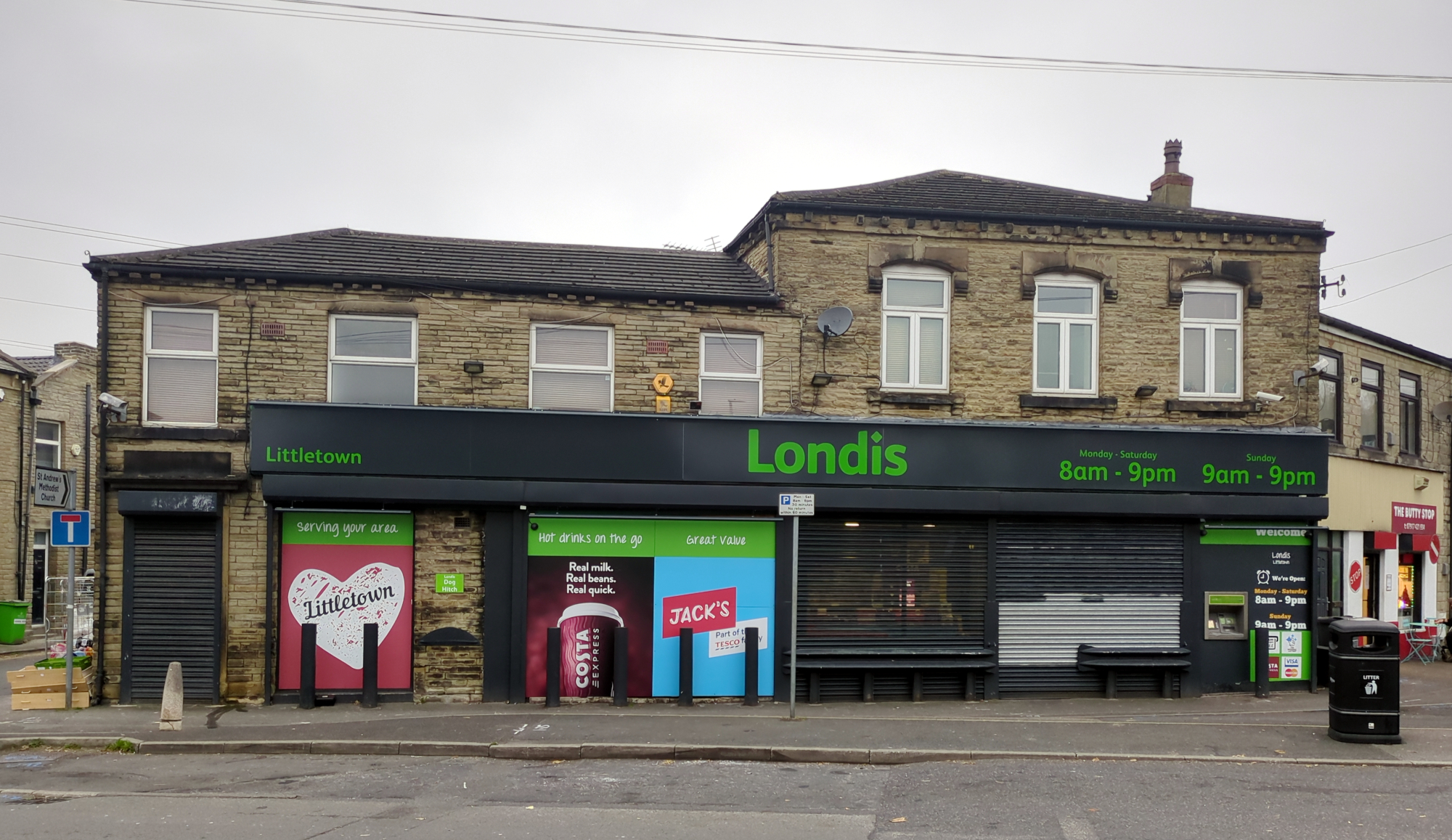
A Londis location in Littletown, West Yorkshire, 2024

=== Acquisition by Musgrave Group ===
In June 2004, the parent company was sold to the Irish Musgrave wholesale chain with a payment of £31,000 being made to each retailer who owned a stake, bringing it under the same ownership as Budgens, which has now adopted a similar franchise based business model. This acquisition proved controversial, with the CEO of Musgrave in the United Kingdom, Eoin McGettigan, steering through the choppy waters of member revolts and counter offers from others backed by Icelandic banks. A separate, but wholly owned subsidiary company, Musgrave Retail Partners GB Ltd. was formed to supply the stores, until it was sold to Booker Group in 2015. In May 2015, Londis' parent company Musgrave Group confirmed it had reached an agreement to sell Budgens and Londis for £40 million to the wholesaler Booker Group, subject to regulatory approval.

=== Acquisition by Booker Group ===
Since May 2015, the company has been owned by Booker Group, which purchased Londis and its sister company Budgens from the Musgrave Group for £40 million.

Tesco PLC acquired Booker Group in 2018.

== Operations ==
The current Londis retailer network is in excess of 2,200 stores and forecourt shops located throughout England, Scotland, Wales [10] and the Republic of Ireland.

== Controversies ==
In the early 2000s, tensions arose between Londis and its member retailers when the company was still operating as a retailer-owned co-operative. During this period, some shopkeepers criticised the conduct of senior management in relation to takeover negotiations, alleging that directors stood to benefit disproportionately. Londis has also faced criticism from some independent store owners over supply and purchasing requirements. Changes to minimum order levels and spending thresholds were reported to place financial strain on smaller retailers, particularly those in rural areas, raising concerns that such policies could contribute to store closures.
