= Superquinn =

Irish supermarket chain

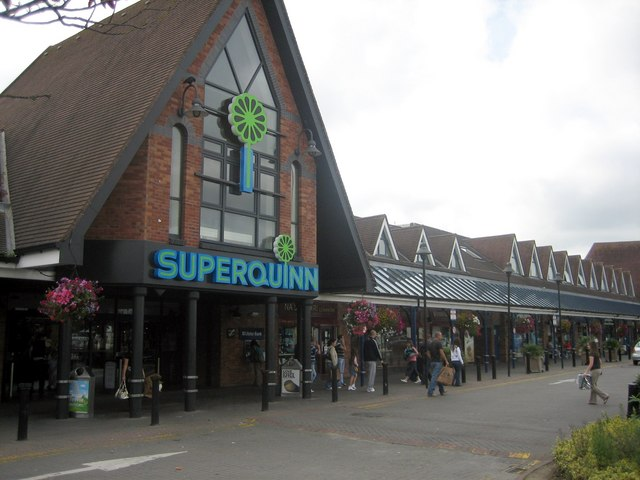
- Superquinn at Lucan Shopping Centre
- Industry: Retail (various)
- Founded: 1960 (as Quinn's Supermarket)
- Defunct: 13 February 2014
- Fate: Acquired by Musgrave Group and absorbed into the SuperValu brand
- Successor: SuperValu
- Headquarters: Dublin, Ireland
- Number of locations: 24
- Area served: Ireland
- Key people: Tim Kenny (Managing Director)
- Products: Groceries, Fresh food, etc.
- Parent: Musgrave Group (2011–2014)

Superquinn was an Irish supermarket chain, founded in 1960 and entirely privately owned by the Quinn family. Select Retail Holdings, a property buying consortium, purchased the company from the Quinn family in 2005. A receiver was appointed to the company on 18 July 2011, and the following day the company was bought by Musgrave Group for an undisclosed sum. On 13 February 2014 all remaining units were rebranded as SuperValu.

== Products and services ==
The company operated 20 supermarkets under the Superquinn brand and 4 convenience shops under the "Superquinn Select" brand. It had three levels of own brand products of increasing quality; "Euro Shopper", "Superquinn" and "Superior Quality". In 2011, the Euroshopper brand was replaced by "Superquinn Essentials", their low cost, but still high quality, own brand products. Superquinn was known for having a very high level of customer service compared to other supermarket chains, its former owner having written a manual on customer service, Crowning the Customer". It was also known for having introduced a number of innovations, including Ireland's first supermarket loyalty card in 1993, SuperClub re branded in 2007 as Reward Card. It also introduced self-scanning of goods by customers in a number of its outlets (Reward Card SuperScan). Superquinn was known as one of the better retail grocery companies to work for.

Superquinn was part of an Irish Internet shopping portal Buy4Now, which provides Internet shopping services for a number of Irish retailers.

== History ==
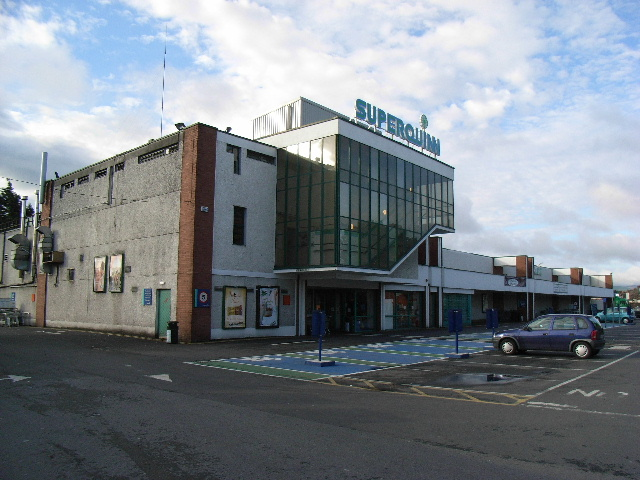
A Superquinn supermarket in Walkinstown, Dublin.

The business was founded in 1960 as 'Quinns Supermarkets' in Dundalk by Feargal Quinn, and the company headquarters were later moved to Sutton, Dublin. The trading name was subsequently changed to Superquinn, in part to differentiate it from rival Quinnsworth, which had started in the early 1970s. In 1970, the company name was legally registered and founded.

In 1991, Feargal's son Eamonn Quinn took a key management role as deputy chairman.

In January 2005, it was announced that Superquinn was to be sold to a company called Select Retail Holdings, consortium which had been formed in 2002. On 26 August 2005 it was announced that the sale had been completed. Simon Burke replaced Feargal Quinn as Executive Chairman of the company, with Quinn becoming non-executive President of the business. Eamonn Quinn left the company.

In January 2009, the company made the decision to close the Dundalk supermarket. This was the second time Superquinn had failed in Dundalk, but in September 2010 a High Court order forced Superquinn to re-open in its home town again.

== Expansion ==
In February 2007 Superquinn purchased the Montrose Hotel in Donnybrook from Jury's Doyle for €40 million and planned to develop the site as a supermarket and apartments. Superquinn expanded after the SRH takeover. It opened supermarkets in Heuston South Quarter, Rathborne, Rathgar, Ranelagh and Portlaoise and planned to open in Clongriffin.

In early 2010 it was confirmed that the Heuston South Quarter shop was on schedule for a planned opening in October 2010, it opened on 14 October 2010.

The Sunday Times Home section reported in May 2010 that Superquinn Clongriffin was on hold, with Superquinn quoting that they were "not yet in a position to confirm a likely opening date for a store in Clongriffin". Residents of Clongriffin and surrounding neighbourhoods feared the planned opening would not transpire.

On 3 September 2008, The Irish Times reported that a number of approaches had been made to buy Superquinn, including from BWG Foods Limited, The Musgrave Group plc, J Sainsbury plc, and Asda Stores Limited. However, later that day Simon Burke told RTÉ News and Current Affairs that the company was not for sale.

Superquinn opened its refurbished flagship supermarket in Blackrock, Co Dublin in October 2012. The retailer invested over €2m in the layout of the shop, including a complete overhaul of the fresh food section and an expansion of the fish counter, butchery, cheesemonger and parking spaces area. It had also completed work on Ballinteer, Blanchardstown, Bray, Knocklyon, Northside, Ranelagh, Swords and Walkinstown.

== Failed ventures ==
The company's innovations did not all become successful. One side effort of the company was the failed bank Tusa (the Irish word for you in the accusative case), a joint venture with TSB Bank (now part of Permanent TSB). A joint venture with Texaco to introduce small Superquinn convenience shops at petrol forecourts, SuperQ, also failed.

Perhaps more importantly for the company was its failure to expand - Superquinn had less than a third of the branches of its other full-service rivals, Tesco Ireland and Dunnes Stores, and was even eclipsed by discount retailers Aldi and Lidl, who have been very aggressive in acquiring sites compared to Superquinn. Its supermarkets were heavily located in the Dublin and Leinster areas (with 3 in Munster, and none at all in Connacht or Ulster) in contrast to the other operators which operated nationwide.

== Receivership and sale ==
On 18 July 2011, it was announced that receivers had been appointed to the Superquinn chain. This was triggered by a consortium of banks believed to be owed around €400m. On 19 July 2011, the chain was reported to have been sold to wholesale group Musgrave Group for just over €100m. Staff were informed that there would be no change to their terms and conditions, or their pensions under the takeover by Musgrave.

The Irish Times reported on 23 July 2011 that two high court actions had been initiated to challenge the receivership and instead place the business in examinership. Lithuanian VP Group was named as a possible bidder for the company.

On 27 July 2011, RTÉ reported that the petition for examinership had been withdrawn, allowing the proposed buyout to proceed. Musgrave provided a €10 million fund to benefit suppliers owed money by Superquinn. The Superquinn name disappeared from Ireland's main streets on 13 February 2014 after owner, the Musgrave Group, announced its decision to rebrand all 24 Superquinn units as SuperValu.

The SuperQuinn brand has been retained for a limited range of products, including sausages.

== See also ==
- List of Irish companies
