= P&H =

P&H may refer to:

- P&H Mining, equipment manufacturer
- Palmer and Harvey, wholesaler
- Parrish & Heimbecker, grain company
