= List of companies of Ireland =

Location of Ireland

This is a list of notable companies based in Ireland, or subsidiaries according to their sector. It includes companies from the entire island. The state of the Republic of Ireland covers five-sixths of the island, with Northern Ireland, part of the United Kingdom, covering the remainder in the north-east. Each has separate regulatory and registration authorities.

== About companies in Ireland ==
Irish companies fall into three categories:

- Private limited companies, which carry the suffix "Limited" (Ltd) or "Teoranta" (Teo), and whose shares are privately held.
- Public limited companies, which carry the suffix "plc" or "cpt" and whose shares may be listed on a stock exchange. Where this is the case, it is noted in this article.
- Company limited by guarantee, this type of company has members, not shareholders, as such generally limited to trade associations and not-for-profit bodies.

Companies in the Republic of Ireland must be registered with the Companies Registration Office, and comply with the provisions of the Companies Acts. Companies in Northern Ireland must be registered with the Department for the Economy's Companies Registry. Certain Northern Ireland organisations are dealt with on a UK-wide basis and are dealt with by Companies House.

Some entries on this list may be statutory corporations - a business form governed by a board appointed by an Irish Government minister under a particular piece of legislation - not formally companies as such, but are effectively treated as such and are included on this list as they are usually large business. For more details on this form of governance, see state-sponsored bodies of Ireland.

Some mutual bodies, such as building societies, are also included on this list.

Some entries such as Three Ireland and Intel Ireland are subsidiaries of foreign companies. These subsidiaries are listed because the Irish economy is significantly dependent on foreign companies in comparison to other nations and these multinational companies are major Irish employers and tax contributors - Intel Ireland employs over 5000 people.

== Largest firms ==
This list shows firms in the Fortune Global 500, which ranks firms by total revenues reported before 31 March 2017. Only the top five firms (if available) are included as a sample.

Rank	Image	Name	2016 revenues (US$M)	Employees	Notes
272		Johnson Controls	37,674	209,000	Multinational industrial conglomerate manufacturing electronics for the automotive industry and commercial electrical equipment. After a full merger with Tyco International in 2016, the firm established headquarters in Cork, Ireland.
305		Accenture	34,798	384,000	Global professional services and management consulting firm. The company formed as a spin-off from the U.S.-based Arthur Andersen in 1989 and moved their headquarters to Dublin in 2009. Accenture's clients include more than three-quarters of the Fortune Global 500.
363		CRH plc	29,973	86,778	Diversified building materials and construction holding company. The firm provides heavyside products and materials (cement, aggregates and concrete), lightside products (glass, fencing), and retail product distribution (merchant chains).
377		Medtronic	28,833	98,017	Multinational medical device design, development and manufacturing. company. After acquiring Dublin-based Covidien in 2014, the firm moved their headquarters from the United States to Ireland while retaining operational headquarters in Fridley, Minnesota.

== Notable firms ==
This list includes notable companies with primary headquarters located in the country. The industry and sector follow the Industry Classification Benchmark framework. Organizations which have ceased operations are included and noted as defunct.

Notable companies Status: P=Private, S=State; A=Active, D=Defunct
Name	Industry	Sector	Headquarters	Founded	Notes	Status	
Abrakebabra	Consumer services	Food retailers & wholesalers	Dublin	1982	Fast-food, part of Abrakebabra Investments	P	A
Accenture	Industrials	Business support services	Dublin	1989	Management consulting	P	A
Aer Lingus	Consumer services	Airlines	Dublin	1936	Flag carrier, part of International Airlines Group (Spain)	P	A
Aer Lingus Regional	Consumer services	Airlines	Dublin	2010	Commuter and regional airline, part of Aer Lingus	P	A
AerCap	Industrials	Transport	Dublin	2006	Aircraft leasing	P	A
Aircoach	Consumer services	Travel & tourism	Dublin	1999	Part of FirstGroup (UK)	P	A
The Airporter	Consumer services	Travel & tourism	Derry	1990	Coach connection between Derry and Belfast airports	P	A
Airtricity	Utilities	Alternative electricity	Dublin	1997	Electricity generation, part of Scottish and Southern Energy (UK)	P	A
Allied Irish Banks (AIB)	Financials	Banks	Dublin	1966	One of the Big Four banks	P	A
An Post	Industrials	Delivery services	Dublin	1984	Postal services	S	A
Aon	Financials	Financial services	Dublin	1982	Professional services	P	A
Apache Pizza	Consumer services	Food retailers & wholesalers	Dublin	2006	Pizza chain	P	A
Arnotts	Consumer services	Broadline retailers	Dublin	1843	Department store, part of Selfridges (UK)	P	A
Baltimore Technologies	Technology	Internet	Dublin	1976	Part of Oryx International Growth Fund	P	A
Bank of Ireland	Financials	Banks	Dublin	1783	One of the Big Four banks	P	A
Barry's Tea	Consumer goods	Beverages	Cork	1901	One of the largest importers of tea in Ireland	P	A
Bewley's	Consumer services	Food retailers & wholesalers	Dublin	1840	Hot beverages	P	A
Bord na Móna	Utilities	Multiutilities	Newbridge	1946	Power generation and land development	P	A
Boylesports	Consumer services	Gambling	Dundalk	1989	Betting shops	P	A
BT Ireland	Telecommunications	Fixed line telecommunications	Dublin	1990	Part of BT Group (UK), formerly Esat BT	P	A
Bus Éireann	Consumer services	Travel & tourism	Dublin	1987	Irish national bus company, part of CIÉ	P	A
Butlers Chocolates	Consumer goods	Food products	Dublin	1932	Luxury chocolate and chocolate products	P	A
BWG Foods	Consumer services	Food retailers & wholesalers	Dublin	1963	Wholesaler and grocery franchise	P	A
C&C Group	Consumer goods	Brewers	Dublin	1852	Alcoholic drinks	P	A
Central Bank of Ireland	Financials	Banks	Dublin	1943	Central bank and financial services regulator	S	A
CIÉ	Consumer services	Travel & tourism	Dublin	1945	Public transportation	S	A
CityJet	Consumer services	Airlines	Dublin	1992	Regional airline	P	A
Communicorp	Consumer services	Broadcasting & entertainment	Dublin	1989	Media holdings	P	A
Covidien	Health care	Medical equipment	Dublin	2007	Merged with Medtronic in 2016	P	D
CRH plc	Industrials	Building materials & fixtures	Dublin	1936	Building materials and retail	P	A
Cúram Software	Technology	Software	Dublin	1990	Social enterprise management software, acquired by IBM	P	D
DAA	Consumer services	Transportation services	Dublin	1937	Airport management, formerly the Dublin Airport Authority	S	A
DCC Plc	Industrials	Business support services	Dublin	1976	Sales and marketing support	P	A
Dealz	Consumer services	Broadline retailers	Dublin	2011	Discount retail, part of Poundland (UK)	P	A
Digiweb	Telecommunications	Fixed line telecommunications	Dundalk	1997	Broadband	P	A
Doolittles	Consumer services	Food retailers & wholesalers	Laghey	2001	Lliquidated in 2009	P	A
Dublin Bus	Consumer services	Travel & tourism	Dublin	1987	Bus company, part of CIÉ	S	A
Dunnes Stores	Consumer services	Broadline retailers	Dublin	1944	Retail chain	P	A
Eason & Son	Consumer services	Specialty retailers	Dublin	1819	Book stores	P	A
Eaton Corporation	Conglomerate	-	Dublin	1911	-	P	A
EBS	Financials	Banks	Dublin	1935	Financing	P	A
Eddie Rocket's	Consumer services	Food retailers & wholesalers	Dublin	1989	American-style food chain	P	A
EDUN	Consumer goods	Clothing & accessories	Dublin	2005	Fashion brand, part of LVMH (France)	P	A
Eir	Telecommunications	Fixed line telecommunications	Dublin	1999	Broadband	P	A
Eir Sport	Consumer services	Broadcasting & entertainment	Dublin	1990	Sports television, part of Eir	P	A
Energia Group	Utilities	Conventional electricity	Belfast	1998	Electricity generation, formerly Viridian Group	P	A
EQTEC	Utilities	Alternative electricity	Cork	2005	Renewable energy	P	A
Ervia	Utilities	Gas distribution	Cork	1976	Gas and electricity distribution	P	A
ESB Group	Utilities	Conventional electricity	Dublin	1927	Electricity distribution and generation	P	A
Experian	Financials	Business services	Dublin	1996	Credit services	P	A
FBD Holdings	Financials	Full line insurance	Dublin	1969	Auto and property insurance	P	A
FINEOS	Technology	Software	Dublin	1993	Software development	P	A
First Trust Bank	Financials	Banks	Belfast	1991	One of the Big Four banks, part of Allied Irish Banks	P	A
Four Star Pizza	Consumer services	Food retailers & wholesalers	Dublin	1986	Fast-food pizza chain	P	A
Fyffes	Consumer goods	Food products	Dublin	1888	Banana and other produce importers	P	A
Glanbia	Consumer goods	Food products	Kilkenny	1997	Nutrition	P	A
GlenDimplex	Consumer goods	Consumer electronics	Dublin	1973	Manufacturer of consumer electrical goods	P	A
GoCar	Consumer services	Specialized consumer services	Dublin	2008	Car sharing service	P	A
Greencore	Consumer goods	Food products	Dublin	1991	Food conglomerate	P	A
Guineys	Consumer services	Apparel retailers	Dublin	1971	Clothing and department stores	P	A
Guinness	Consumer goods	Brewers	Dublin	1759	Part of Diageo (UK)	P	A
Havok	Technology	Software	Dublin	1998	Software development, part of Microsoft (US)	P	A
Heatons	Consumer services	Broadline retailers	Dublin	1946	Department stores, part of Sports Direct (UK)	P	A
Horizon Therapeutics	Consumer services	Biopharmaceutical	Dublin	2005	Pharmaceutical	P	A
Iarnród Éireann	Consumer services	Travel & tourism	Dublin	1987	Passenger rail company, part of CIÉ	S	A
Independent News & Media	Consumer services	Publishing	Dublin	1904	News publisher	P	A
Insomnia Coffee Company	Consumer services	Food retailers & wholesalers	Dublin	1997	Coffee chain	P	A
Intel Ireland	Technology	Semiconductors	Leixlip	1989	Largest manufacturing plant outside of the United States	P	A
IONA Technologies	Technology	Software	Dublin	1991	Acquired by Progress Software in 2008	P	D
Irish Citylink	Consumer services	Travel & tourism	Dublin	1994	Part of ComfortDelGro (Singapore)	P	A
Irish Continental Group	Industrials	Industrial transportation	Dublin	1972	Shipping and transport	P	A
Irish Ferries	Industrials	Industrial transportation	Dublin	1992	Part of Irish Continental Group	P	A
The Irish Times	Consumer services	Publishing	Dublin	1859	Daily newspaper	P	A
Johnson Controls	Industrials	Electrical components & equipment	Cork	1885	Electronic equipment	P	A
KBC Bank Ireland	Financials	Banks	Dublin	1973	Formerly IIB Bank	P	D
Kerry Group	Consumer goods	Food products	Tralee	1972	Food and dairy	P	A
Kingspan	Industrials	Building materials	Dublin	1966	Building materials	P	A
Laya Healthcare	Financials	Life insurance	Little Island	1997	Private health insurance	P	A
Linde	Basic materials	Speciality chemicals	Dublin	1879	Chemical industry	P	A
Magnet Networks	Telecommunications	Fixed line telecommunications	Dublin	2004	Broadband	P	A
Mannok	Industrials	Building materials & fixtures	Derrylin	1973	Construction, formerly Aventas and the QUINN group	P	A
Medtronic	Health care	Medical equipment	Dublin	1949	Medical devices, operational headquarters in Fridley, Minnesota (US)	P	A
Meteor	Telecommunications	Mobile telecommunications	Dublin	1998	Merged into Eir	P	D
Metro	Consumer services	Travel & tourism	Belfast	1973	Formerly Citybus, part of Northern Ireland Transport Holding Company	S	A
Musgrave Group	Consumer services	Food retailers & wholesalers	Cork	1876	Food and grocery	P	A
National Lottery	Consumer services	Gambling	Dublin	1987	National lottery, part of private firm Premier Lotteries Ireland	P	A
News Broadcasting	Consumer services	Broadcasting & entertainment	Belfast	2007	Radio and television	P	A
NI Railways	Consumer services	Travel & tourism	Belfast	1967	Passenger rail, part of Northern Ireland Transport Holding Company	S	A
Norkom	Technology	Software	Dublin	1998	Now a part of Detica	P	D
Northern Ireland Electricity	Utilities	Conventional electricity	Belfast	1991	Part of ESB Group	S	A
Northern Ireland Transport Holding Company	Consumer services	Travel & tourism	Belfast	1967	Holding company for passenger bus and rail, branded as Translink	S	A
NTR plc	Utilities	Alternative electricity	Dublin	1978	Infrastructure development	P	A
Oatfield	Consumer goods	Food products	Letterkenny	1927	Defunct, brand now part of Zed Candy	P	D
O'Briens Irish Sandwich Bars	Consumer services	Food retailers & wholesalers	Dublin	1988	Sandwich chain, part of Abrakebabra Investments	P	A
Openet	Technology	Software	Dublin	1999	Telecom software vendor, acquired by Amdocs in 2020.	P	A
Ornua	Consumer goods	Food products	Dublin	1961	Dairy	P	A
Paddy Power	Consumer services	Gambling	Dublin	1988	Betting shops	P	A
Pat the Baker	Consumer goods	Baked goods	Granard	1953	Bakery	P	A
Penneys	Consumer services	Apparel retailers	Dublin	1962	Part of Associated British Foods (UK)	P	A
Permanent TSB	Financials	Life insurance	Dublin	1884	Financial services, life insurance	P	A
Perrigo	Health care	Pharmaceuticals	Dublin	1887	Pharmaceutical	P	A
Rabobank Ireland	Financials	Banks	Dublin	1994	Part of Rabobank (Netherlands)	P	A
Raidió Teilifís Éireann (RTÉ)	Consumer services	Broadcasting & entertainment	Dublin	1960	Television and radio	S	A
Rothco	Business services	Marketing & advertising	Dublin	1995	Advertising agency	P	A
Ryanair	Consumer services	Airlines	Dublin	1985	Low-cost airline	P	A
Shire	Health care	Pharmaceuticals	Dublin	1986	Biopharmaceutical	P	A
Smart Telecom	Telecommunications	Mobile telecommunications	Dublin	1989	Telecom, defunct 2011	P	D
Smurfit Kappa	Consumer goods	Paper	Dublin	1934	Packaging	P	A
Smyths	Consumer services	Specialty retailers	Galway	1986	Toy retailer	P	A
Stobart Air	Consumer services	Airlines	Dublin	2014	Regional airline, defunct 2021	P	D
Supermac's	Consumer services	Food retailers & wholesalers	Ballybrit	1978	Fast food chain	P	A
SuperValu	Consumer services	Food retailers & wholesalers	Cork	1968	Supermarkets, part of Musgrave Group	P	A
TE Connectivity	Industrials	Electronic equipment	Galway	2007	Electronics	P	A
Teilifís na Gaeilge	Consumer services	Broadcasting & entertainment	Baile na hAbhann	2007	Operator of TG4 and Cúla 4	P	A
Tesco Ireland	Consumer services	Food retailers & wholesalers	Dublin	1997	Supermarkets, part of Tesco (UK)	P	A
Thomas Crosbie Holdings	Consumer services	Publishing	Cork	1841	Newspaper holdings, defunct 2013	P	D
Three Ireland	Telecommunications	Fixed line telecommunications	Dublin	2005	Telecommunications	P	A
Tirlán	Consumer goods	Food products	Kilkenny	1997	Dairy	P	A
Today FM	Consumer services	Broadcasting & entertainment	Dublin	1997	Subsidiary of Communicorp	P	A
Trane Technologies	Conglomerate	-	Swords	1871	-	P	A
Transport Infrastructure Ireland	Industrials	Heavy construction	Dublin	2015	National road and public transport infrastructure	S	A
UDG Healthcare	Health care	Pharmaceuticals	Dublin	1948	Health care support	P	A
Ulster Bank	Financials	Banks	Dublin	1836	Big Four bank, part of NatWest Group (UK)	P	A
Ulsterbus	Consumer services	Travel & tourism	Belfast	1967	Bus, part of Northern Ireland Transport Holding Company	S	A
Ulsterbus Foyle	Consumer services	Travel & tourism	Derry	2006	Bus, part of Northern Ireland Transport Holding Company	S	A
Valeo Foods	Consumer goods	Food products	Dublin	2010	Food	P	A
Vhi Healthcare	Financials	Life insurance	Purcellsinch	1957	Health insurance	S	A
Virgin Media Ireland	Telecommunications	Fixed line telecommunications	Dublin	2005	Subsidiary of Liberty Global (US)	P	A
Virgin Media Television	Consumer services	Broadcasting & entertainment	Dublin	1998	Television, part of Virgin Media Ireland	P	A
Vizor	Technology	Software	Dublin	2000	Creator of regulator software for central banks	P	A
Vodafone Ireland	Telecommunications	Mobile telecommunications	Dublin	1984	Subsidiary of Vodafone (UK), formerly Eircell	P	A
Wrightbus	Industrials	Commercial vehicles & trucks	Ballymena	1946	Coach-builder	P	A

== See also ==
- Celtic Tiger
- Communications in Ireland
- Companies Registration Office
- IDA Ireland
- Irish Stock Exchange
- Mass media in the Republic of Ireland
- Transport in Ireland
