= Bargain Booze =

Chain of off-license tin the UK

- Type: Privately held company
- Founded: 1981; 45 years ago
- Headquarters: Stoke-on-Trent, Staffordshire, United Kingdom
- Area served: United Kingdom
- Products: Groceries, Alcohol
- Parent: Bestway
- Website: www.bargainbooze.co.uk

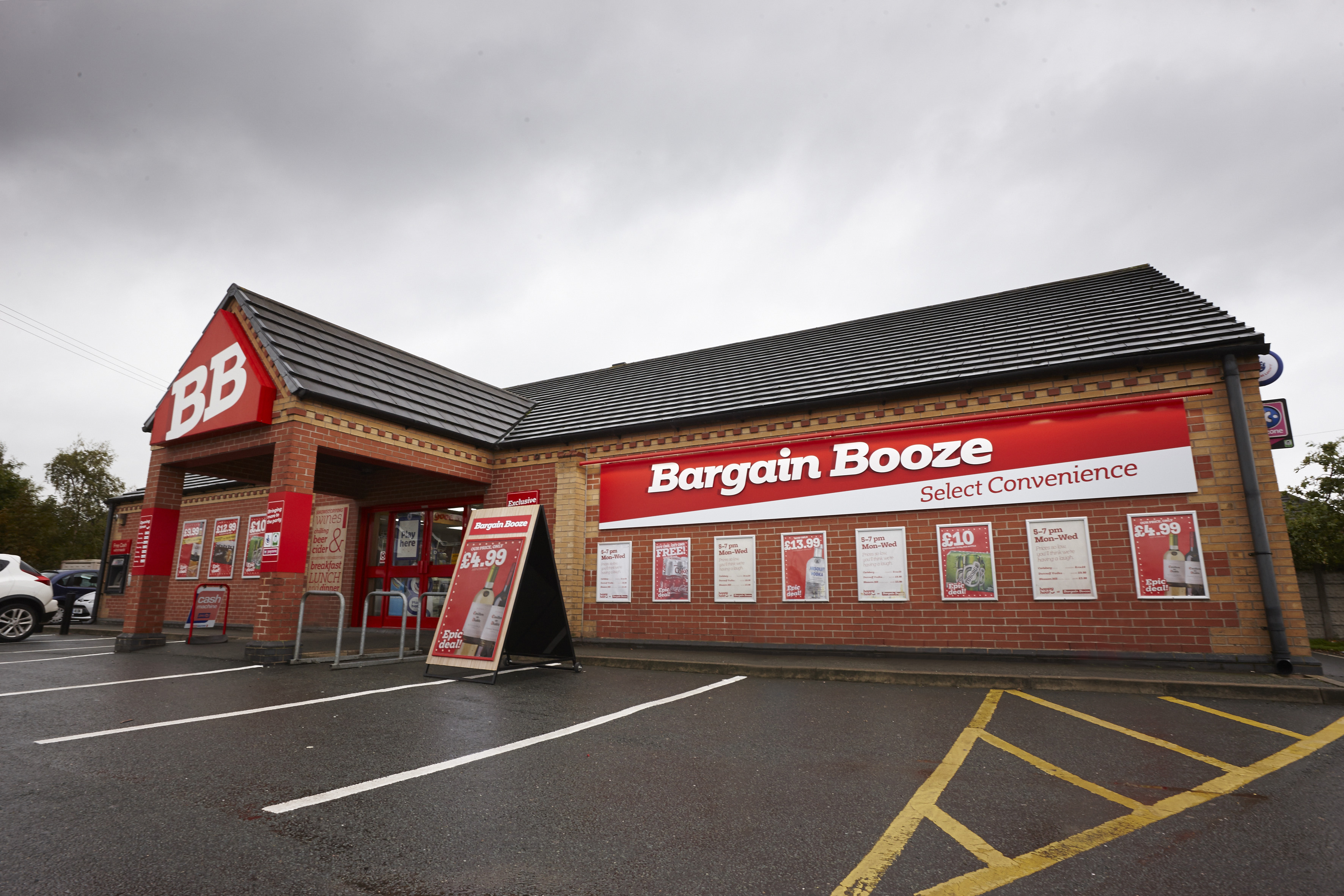
Bargain Booze, Sandy Lane, Sandbach

Bargain Booze is a chain of off licence shops, that operates in the United Kingdom. Established in 1981 in Sandbach, it grew to 836 shops and established the Bargain Booze Select Convenience shop franchise.

From 2013 to April 2018, it was owned by Conviviality plc, who also owned the Wine Rack chain. Both brands were acquired by Bestway on 6 April 2018.

== History ==
The company originates from a wholesale wine and spirits business, founded by Allan Whittle and Robert Mayor. In 1981, they opened their first retail outlet in Sandbach, Cheshire. The first Bargain Booze franchise opened in 1988, and was the first time the Bargain Booze fascia was used.

In January 2000, Whittle & Mayor sold the company to BWG Foods. In July 2002, BWG was bought out by Electra Partners. A management buyout backed by a private equity firm, ECI Partners, took over the company for £63.5 million in 2006. Until July 2013, ECI remained the majority shareholder when the company floated on the Alternative Investment Market (AIM). With the collapse of First Quench Retailing, who owned Threshers, in November 2010, Bargain Booze became the largest off licence chain in the United Kingdom.

In September 2013, the company acquired the Wine Rack chain, an off licence chain that specialises in retailing wine, with its 22 outlets mostly located in London and South East England. In December 2013, the company launched its first television advertising campaign. In December 2017 Bargain Booze purchased Central Convenience Stores from Palmer and Harvey.

=== 2018 financial difficulties ===
The chain was owned by Conviviality, who also owned Matthew Clark and Bibendum, and had a head office in Crewe. In March 2018, Conviviality stated that it faced bankruptcy unless it could raise £125 million, as it issued its third profits warning in a month alongside a £30 million unpaid tax bill. The company had earlier said it was considering tapping shareholders for funds, and had arranged meetings with institutional investors to persuade them to take part in its share placing to raise the required money. This was unsuccessful and at the end of March, Conviviality announced its intention to appoint administrators within a fortnight, putting 2,600 jobs at risk. In early April 2018, the Bargain Booze and Wine Rack brands were acquired for £7 million by wholesaler Bestway, while Matthew Clark and Bibendum were acquired by C&C Group, the owner of Magners cider.

== Operations ==
Bargain Booze is operated through a franchise model, with around 390 franchisees. The chain is strongest in the North of England, particularly the North West. It is the largest off-licence chain in the United Kingdom.
