= Bobby Kerr (businessman) =

Irish entrepreneur and businessman (born 1960)

- Born: 5 August 1960 (age 66); Dublin, Ireland
- Education: Dublin Institute of Technology
- Occupations: Entrepreneur, Businessman
- Known for: Dragon on the Irish Dragons' Den
- Title: Chairman Insomnia Coffee
- Spouse: Mary Kerr
- Children: Meghan; Emily; Rebecca; Michaela

Bobby Kerr is an Irish entrepreneur and businessman. He was the chairman of Insomnia Coffee Company. In 2009, he was a "dragon" on the Irish version of Dragons' Den, produced by Raidió Teilifís Éireann (RTÉ).

== Career ==
Kerr's first job was in 1981 as chef/trainee manager in AIB Catering Ballsbridge. For two years he worked at the North Sea oil rigs, before working for Versa Food Services in Canada in 1984. While in Canada, Kerr held Assistant Catering Manager positions in the CNE Stadium Toronto, Ottawa Civic Centre, Crystal Beach Park and African Lion Safari and coordinated the catering for Pope John Paul II's visit to Canada in 1985 for one million people.

When he returned to Ireland in 1986, Kerr took the position of Assistant Manager in Jury's Hotel Ballsbridge. He then took up the role of Catering Manager for Campbell Catering in UCC from 1987–1989. He took up various roles in Campbell Catering, then moving on to business and marketing for Contract Catering Company. In 1992, Kerr transferred to Campbell Bewley's Bewley's operations and took on the role of Managing Director Bewleys Oriental Café, Bewleys Franchising and Bewleys Bakery.

In 1997 Kerr became Director of Development, Campbell Bewley Group, with responsibility for the overseas development of the Bewley Brand in the United Kingdom, United States and Japan.

In 1999 Kerr set up PERK Coffee Shops. In 2003 he bought out Fitzers, who held 50% of the shares in PERK, and then sold Perk to Insomnia in 2004. Kerr reinvested all the proceeds of the Perk sale back into Insomnia and became a shareholder and CEO of Insomnia. Since 2004, Kerr has led the expansion of Insomnia from 17 to 50 shops and increased turnover from €5 million to €13 Million.

In 2008, he sold 51% of Insomnia to the Icelandic Penninn group valuing the business at €16 million.

From 2009 to 2013, he was an investor on the RTE's Dragons' Den.

In October 2010, he took over for Mark Mortell as host of Down to Business, a business focused radio show aired on Newstalk, an Irish talk radio station. Also in 2010, Kerr transitioned from chief executive to chairman of Insomnia Coffee.

In December 2017, Kerr sold the rest of his stake in Insomnia to other shareholders.

== Personal life ==
Bobby Kerr was brought up in Kilkenny where his father ran the family business, the 4 star Newpark Hotel. Kerr was educated in CBS Kilkenny and Castleknock College, Dublin and went on to study Catering Management at Dublin Institute of Technology.

Bobby Kerr currently lives in Sandycove with his wife of 20 years Mary and their four daughters Meghan, Emily, Rebecca and Michaela.

Kerr played for Bective Rangers in Donnybrook, Dublin for ten years.

In April 2011, Kerr spent time doing charity work in Zambia, building a house for a local family caring for AIDS orphans.

On 7 November 2015, Kerr revealed that he had been diagnosed with cancer of the head and neck.
