= BWG Foods =

Irish wholesaler and grocery franchise operator

- Company type: Subsidiary
- Industry: Retail
- Founded: 1973; 53 years ago
- Headquarters: Dublin, Ireland
- Parent: SPAR South Africa
- Website: bwg.ie

BWG Foods Unlimited Company is a wholesaler and retail grocery franchise operator in Ireland, owned by SPAR South Africa. The company head office is based in Tallaght, Dublin, Ireland.

BWG is the second largest wholesaler in Ireland in terms of sales, after Musgrave Group, with sales of over €1.7 billion annually. It used to be owned by a consortium run by Leo Crawford, John O'Donnell and John Clohessy.

In 2015, SPAR South Africa acquired an 80% stake in BWG for €55 million, and gained full ownership in 2021.

== History ==
EDL, a wholesale buying group applied to SPAR to operate the symbol in the Republic of Ireland. SPAR rejected this offer citing inadequate warehousing facilities and that the group had too many members in order to operate the symbol efficiently.

In 1963 a group of wholesalers broke from EDL and formed a consortium, P. Barrett and Sons Ltd, D. Tyndall and Sons Ltd of Dublin and McNulty and O'Reilly Ltd of Bray merged to form Amalgamated Wholesalers Ltd (AWL), Maurice P. Daly Ltd and The Jamaica Banana of Cork merged to form Munster United Merchants Ltd (MUM), and Messrs Looney and Co. Ltd of Limerick, these firms organised the Spar franchise based on the provinces of Leinster, Munster & Connaught. In 1966, a fourth wholesaler, Western Wholesale, joined the consortium securing a National spread for the Spar business.

In 1973, the Brooks-Watson Group (BWG) was formed through the later merger of the 4 SPAR wholesalers in the Republic of Ireland. In 1984 BWG was sold to Irish Distillers.

In 2000, BWG purchased the Mace franchise area in Munster owned by Vantage Wholesale, merging it with its existing franchise area in Leinster.

As of 2002, BWG was owned by Pernod Ricard who had acquired the business as part of Irish Distillers, but offered it for sale as it was not core to their business. BWG was sold via a management buyout financed by Electra Partners Europe for 220m euro. The current owners bought out Electra in 2006 through a vehicle called Triode, with a value of 390m euro placed on the firm.

BWG bought Tolan's Foodservice based in Galway in July 2003, and renamed it "BWG Foodservice". Also in 2003, BWG sold its Bellevue cash & carries in Edinburgh and Stirling, Scotland in October, 5 years after buying it. The Northern Ireland subsidiary J&J Haslett, which held the franchise for Mace was sold in December 2003 via a management buy out. (Musgrave Group subsequently bought J&J Haslett). The Bargain Booze off-licence chain in the United Kingdom was sold in 2004.

In 2008, BWG bought Mangan Bros Ltd a wholesaler based in Ennis, County Clare. With this purchase BWG took control of Mace franchise throughout Ireland. The business consisted of 8 cash and carries in the West of Ireland, and a distribution centre in Collooney in County Sligo supplying Mace stores. BWG promptly closed the Collooney centre and integrated it into their Ballyshannon facility. Seven Cash & Carry closures follow due to location overlaps and duplication, and all sites are now branded Value Centre.

As of September 2010, the company announced the closure of their warehouse in Ballyshannon, County Donegal, with the business transferring into the centre at Walkinstown, Dublin.

In May 2012 BWG acquired Morris Bros of Convoy Donegal. Morris Bros operate a Distribution Centre that supply Gala stores and independent retailers in the north west of Ireland. In June 2012 a new ambient Distribution Centre opened in Kilcarberry, Dublin with the aim of consolidating distribution of ambient goods to all Spar and Mace stores under one roof, including its bonded warehouse. The new 240,000 sq ft centre resulted in the closure of the existing centres in Limerick and Walkinstown, and was expected to handle 26 million cases per year.

BWG announced a partnership with Donnellys Fruit & Veg in August 2012. This saw a new separate distribution centre for chilled foods set up in Kilshane Cross, Dublin. The centre distributed fruit & veg, meats and other chilled products to all BWG's franchise stores nationwide. It affected BWG's Central billing business as a result.

In 2018, BWG Bought Midlands Wholesaler, 4 Aces Wholesale, with cash & carry outlets located in Portlaoise, Clonmel & Navan. a condition of sale was that BWG Foods was to become a member of the Gala Retail Wholesale Network. The sale was subject to approval by the Competition & Consumer Protection Commission (CCPC), with a number of binding conditions, resulting to the 4 Aces Cash & Carry Network being run separately to BWG's Existing Value Centre Business.

This acquisition was followed by further acquisitions of Gala Wholesale Members, Cox's Cash & Carry & Mccarricks Bros in 2022 and Tuffys Wholesale in 2023.

BWG acquired AIL Group in June 2026.

== Notable Operations ==
=== SPAR ===
It is the master franchise operator for the SPAR, Spar Express and EuroSpar brands in Ireland, with approximately 450 Spar stores. Spar Ireland reported €1.67 billion in retail sales in 2007. In Ireland Spar operates in-store franchises for Tim Hortons coffee, Insomnia Coffee Company, Kitsu noodles and Treehouse smoothies among others.

In the south-west of England BWG also own Appleby Westward Foods. This is a small regional SPAR wholesaler based in Saltash, Cornwall. Appleby sold 71 SPAR stores to AF Blakemore in May 2026.

=== Mace ===
BWG holds the master franchise for the Mace chain of 230 stores in Ireland. Maxol and Mace also have an exclusive deal that sees most Maxol owned forecourt shops branded Mace.

=== AIL Group ===
BWG acquired AIL Group in June 2026, the group owns Abrakebabra, O'Briens Irish Sandwich Bars and The Bagel Factory.

=== Other operations ===
Newhill, BWG's retail subsidiary owns over 100 stores which are leased/rented to operators for an agreed percentage of turnover. The stores trade as Spar and Mace.

=== BWG Foodservice ===
BWG Foodservice is a division which offers a full frozen/chill/ambient range aimed at the foodservice channel. The business was born from the purchase of Tolan foodservice and the main depot is still at the same site in Galway. A new site was opened at North Road, Dublin in 2007, and later a third in Cork. These sites are also Value Centres.

=== Value Centre ===
BWG owns Ireland's largest Cash & Carry chain, Value Centre, which has 22 branches nationwide.

Value Centre offer XL to its Value Centre customers as a franchise option. It is a more cost-effective way for retailers who are not suited to a full brand offering, like Spar, to get the benefits of franchise membership. They still receive the benefit of Central billing without the expense or requirements of larger franchises. Competitors include Gala Express operated by Stonehouse Wholesale, and Daytoday operated by Musgrave.

=== 4 Aces Wholesale/Better Deal ===
Acquired by BWG Foods in 2018, the business forms part of the BWG Wholesale Division, and roughly 40 Gala in the Midlands, as well as independent retailers, food service, and bar trade customers

=== Tuffys Wholesale ===
Acquired by BWG in 2023, this is a delivered wholesale business based in the west of Ireland and supplies roughly 60 Gala Retail affiliated outlets, as well as independent retailers, food service, and bar trade customers

See also

- List of Irish companies
