= Central billing =

Central billing is a phrase used to describe the process of using the collective buying power of independent businesses to extract discounts from suppliers. It was pioneered in the convenience grocery sector convenience grocery sector in Europe.

== How it works ==
The process is orchestrated by a middleman (wholesaler) who takes certain risks in order to profit from the process.

== Typical example ==
A convenience store retailer takes delivery every day of bread, milk and other perishable items. Instead of paying cash they put them on the central billing account they hold with their wholesaler. At the end of the month they receive a bill from their wholesaler for all their purchases for the month. The wholesaler in turn pays the individual suppliers.

== Benefits to supplier ==
The supplier still has to make multiple deliveries but instead of having to worry about collecting money from many individual stores it only collects one payment from the wholesaler. By this process the credit risk is removed from the supplier and placed on the wholesaler. In return for this the supplier makes a payment to the wholesaler to reflect these benefits, called a rebate or Long Term Agreement.

== Benefit to retailer ==
The retailer benefits simply by the fact their admin is simplified. Instead of having to monitor many daily payments they simply have to write one cheque a month for potentially thousands of transactions. They pay the wholesaler who in turn pays the suppliers. In addition, they typically receive a rebate (LTA) on their purchases.

== Benefit to wholesaler ==
The wholesaler benefits in a number of ways. Firstly they do not have to pass on in full all the LTA payments they receive. Secondly they offer a valuable service to retailers to whom they also sell other items through their traditional wholesale channels. They do however assume the risk should the retailer fail to pay.

== Centralised distribution ==
In many cases central billing has been superseded by central distribution. Under the centralised distribution model a wholesaler will provide everything their customer needs via their own supply chain. This eradicates the need for supplier deliveries and renders central billing redundant.
