= Fineos =

- Company type: Public
- Traded as: ASX:FCL
- Industry: Software
- Founded: 1993
- Headquarters: Dublin, Ireland
- Key people: Michael Kelly, CEO
- Website: fineos.com

Fineos (stylized in all caps) is a software development company that was founded in 1993. It provides enterprise software for insurance, and government social insurance. The company is headquartered in Dublin, Ireland, and has offices in North America, Europe, Australia and New Zealand.
