= Centra =

Irish convenience shop chain

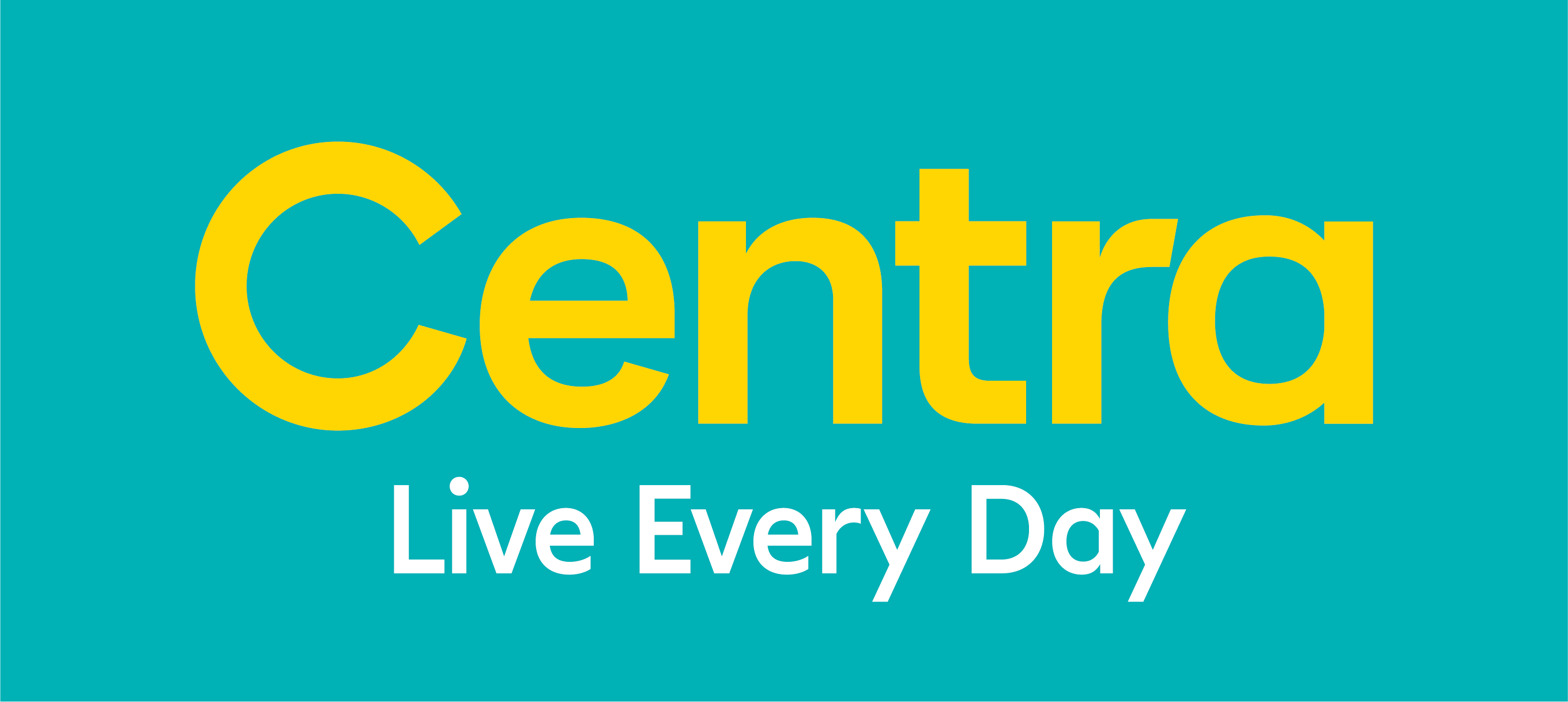
- Centra logo

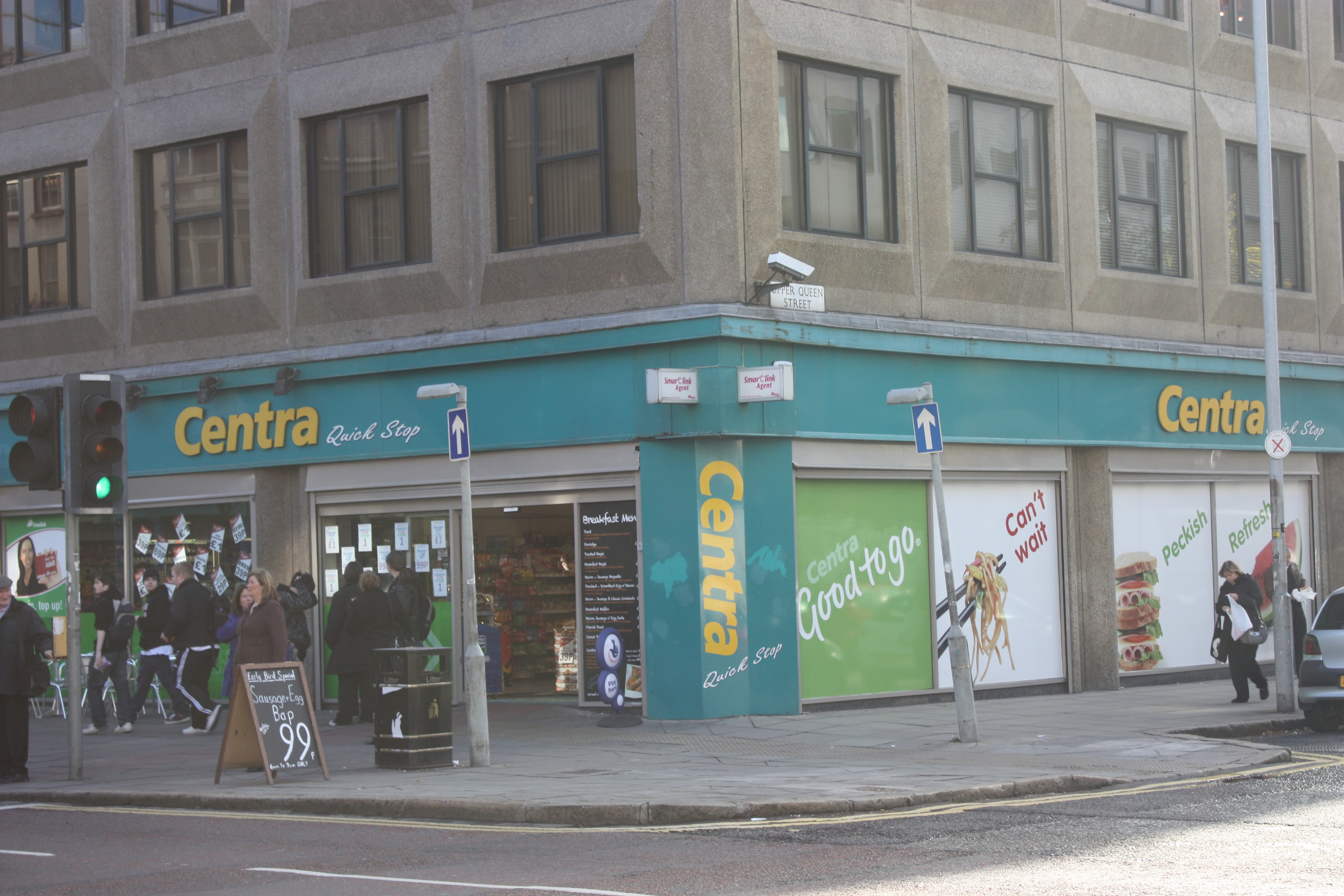
- Type: Franchising
- Industry: Retail
- Headquarters: Cork, Ireland
- Number of locations: 615 (2025)
- Area served: Ireland and Qatar
- Key people: Luke Hanlon (managing director)
- Owner: Musgrave Group
- Website: Centra

Logo used from 2009 to 2024

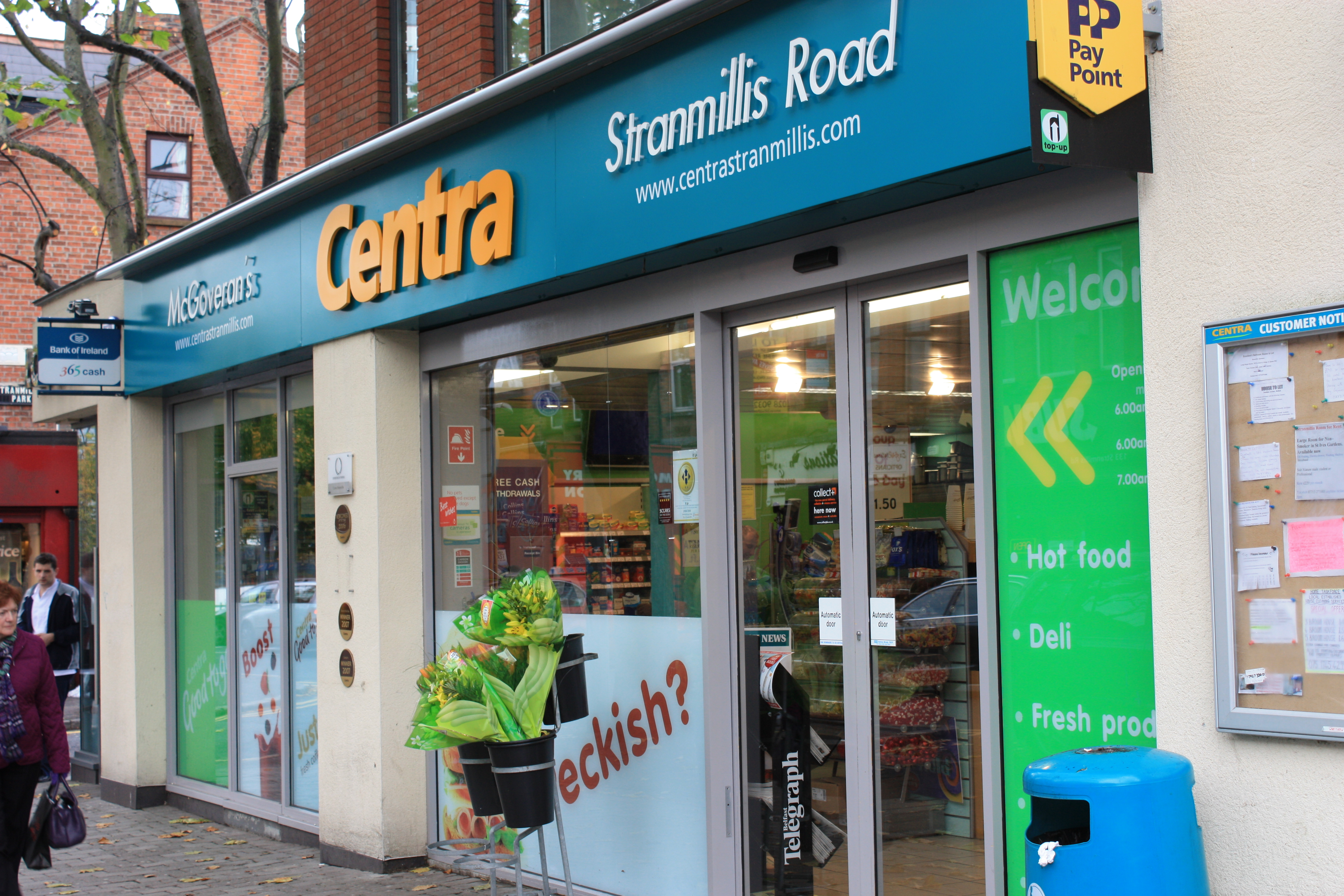
Centra on Stranmills Road, Belfast

Centra is a convenience shop chain that operates throughout Ireland, and has one shop in Qatar. The chain operates as a symbol group owned by Musgrave Group, the food wholesaler, meaning the individual shops are all owned by individual franchisees.

The chain has three different formats available to franchisees—smaller Quick Stop outlets, mid-sized Foodmarkets, and larger Supermarkets. The majority of the shops follow the Quick Stop format, or are simply branded Centra, as Musgrave also offers the SuperValu format, which is geared towards larger supermarkets. There are currently approximately 480 Centra shops in the Republic of Ireland and approximately 80 in Northern Ireland. In 2016, Centra posted a 3% increase in sales to €1.59bn. Centra's main competitors are Gala, Spar and Londis, as well as a number of smaller groups such as Costcutter.

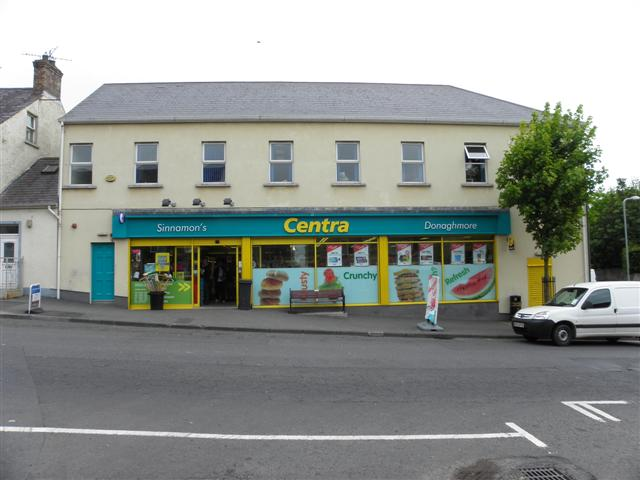
Centra in Donaghmore

The chain was originally launched in the Republic of Ireland as "VG" in 1960. In 1979, the VG chain was rebranded SuperValu with the smaller outlets subsequently rebranded as Centra. The company brought both of these brands to Northern Ireland, the latter through the acquisition and subsequent rebranding of Wellworths shops.

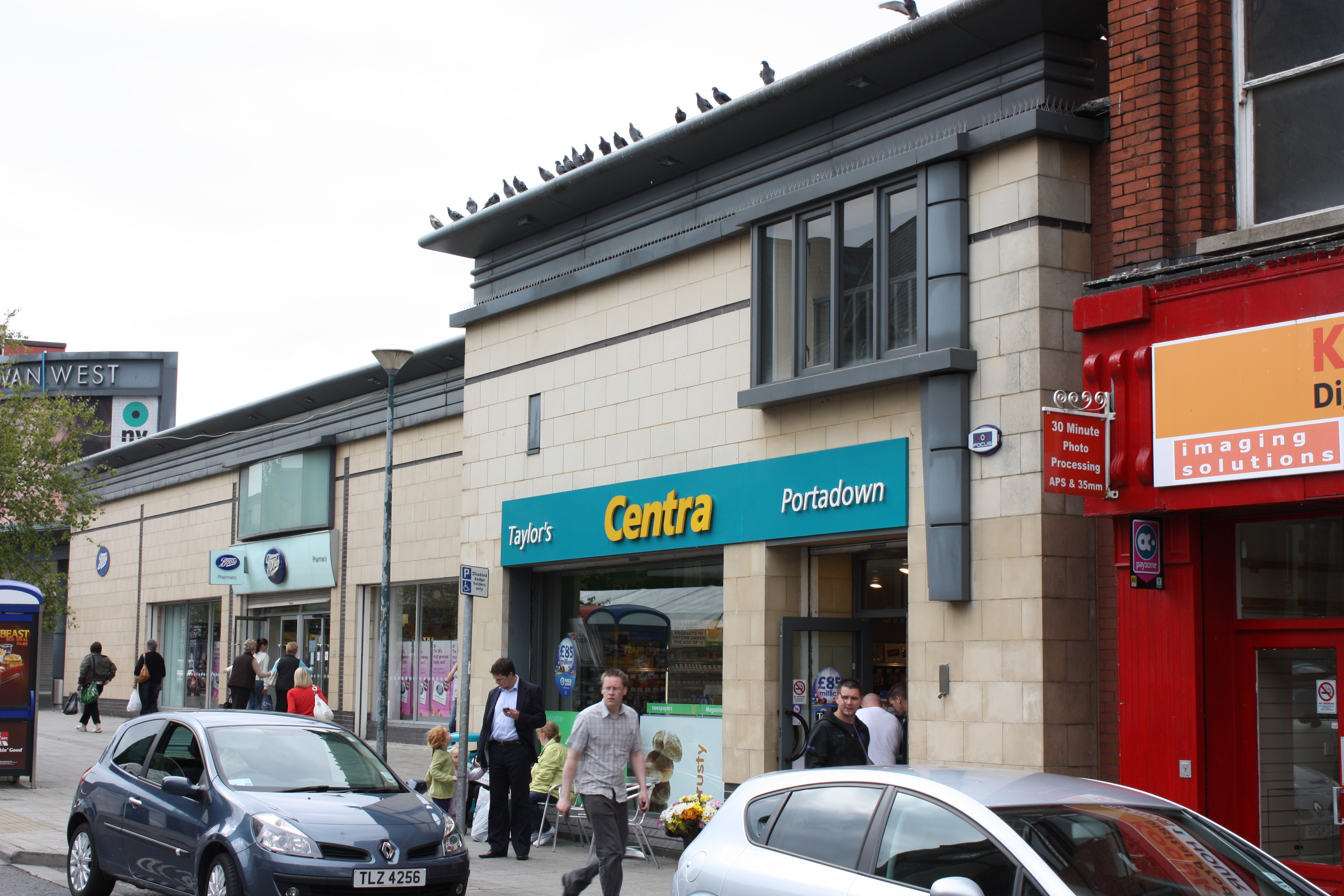
Centra on West Road, Portadown

Centra has over 560 shops throughout the island of Ireland. In 2018, plans were announced to open 30 new shops and redevelop 100 others. In 2022, the first Centra in Qatar opened in Doha. The business employs over 11,000 people and serves over three million customers per week.

== See also ==
- SuperValu
- Musgrave Group
- List of Irish companies
