= Maxol =

Irish oil company

The Maxol Group
- Type: Private
- Industry: Oil
- Founded: 1920; 106 years ago
- Headquarters: Dublin, Republic of Ireland. Mallusk, County Antrim, Northern Ireland.
- Number of locations: 252
- Key people: Brian Donaldson (CEO); Laurence Donegan (CFO) Maximillian Szustak (STBCEO)
- Products: Petrochemical
- Revenue: €786 million (2024)
- Website: maxol.ie

The Maxol Group is an Irish oil company which serves all of Ireland. It was founded in 1920 and is part of McMullan Bros. Limited. As of August 2025, it has 252 locations on the island of Ireland.

== Organisation ==
=== Republic of Ireland ===
- Maxol Lubricants Ltd. (Lubricant supplier to the automotive, industrial, marine, and agricultural markets)
- Maxol Direct Ltd. (Home heating oil)
- Maxol Ltd. (Main petrol station retail network and bulk fuel seller)
- Estuary Fuel Ltd. (Oil terminal operator, petrol stations and various oil products)
- Marsh Oil Products Ltd. (Main import terminal)

=== Northern Ireland ===
- Maxol Oil Ltd. (Main petrol station retail network and bulk fuel seller)
- DGS Logistics, Fuel Distribution for Maxol petrol stations in Northern Ireland and some Republic of Ireland regions. Formerly Trevdon Oil Distribution.
- Maxol Leebody Fuels (Home heating oil)
- Maxol Irwin Fuels (Home heating oil)

== History ==
In 1919, William and James G McMullan signed a supply agreement with the Anglo Mexican Oil Company (AMOC) and in 1920 founded McMullan Bros. Limited. In 1924, AMOC was acquired by Shell; however, McMullan Bros. retained the rights to use the Mex brand name in Ireland.

In 1972, the existing brand names of Mex, Silensol and Daisy, began to be replaced by the Maxol brand, though all operating companies only completed this process in 1981. In 1986, Maxol acquired Ola, operator of an oil terminal at Drogheda, County Louth. In 1996, Maxol acquired 80 retail sites from Statoil and Jet which were to be disposed of as a condition of their merger. In 1997, the group signed a partnership with Mace, a convenience store group, to allow development of joint Maxol/Mace filling stations.

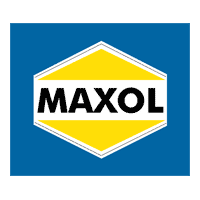
Old Maxol logo used from 1988 until the early 2000s

The Maxol logo used from the 2000s until 2012

In 2000, Maxol acquired Northern Ireland's leading heating oil distributor, Connors Fuels Ltd.. This became Maxol Direct (NI) Ltd. In 2002, it acquired Estuary Fuel Limited which operates an oil terminal, a retail network and markets various oil products.

One of the two Maxol Direct logos.

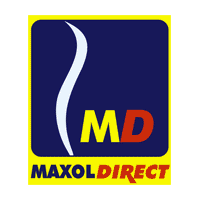
The second Maxol Direct logo.

In 2011, Maxol Direct home heating oil was sold to DCC Energy, which also owns Emo. That same year, they stopped producing the alternative e85, a type of biofuel made from whey in cheese processing for FFV (Flex Fuel Vehicle).

In 2016, Maxol began opening forecourts, with the first one opening in Mulhuddart, Dublin, the company has franchise agreements with Burger King, Supermac's and Abrakebabra for these forecourts.

The Irish petrol station convenience stores began to rebrand around 2017 to use its own name and brands (Rosa Coffee and Maxol Deli) under a deal with BWG Foods, the Northern Irish petrol stations still use Spar and its brands (Daily Deli, Subway franchises and Barista Bar) as its own franchises for shops due to having a contract with NI Spar holder Henderson Foodservice.

In 2023, Maxol had a turnover of €750 million and a profit of €31.2 million. This increased to a turnover of €786 million and a profit of €33.3 million in 2024.

In the period 2023-2025, Maxol acquired 14 new sites and redeveloped or retrofitted 27 of its existing sites.

In October 2025, it was announced that Maxol was to commence offering a meal delivery service, together with grocery delivery.
