= Certa (oil) =

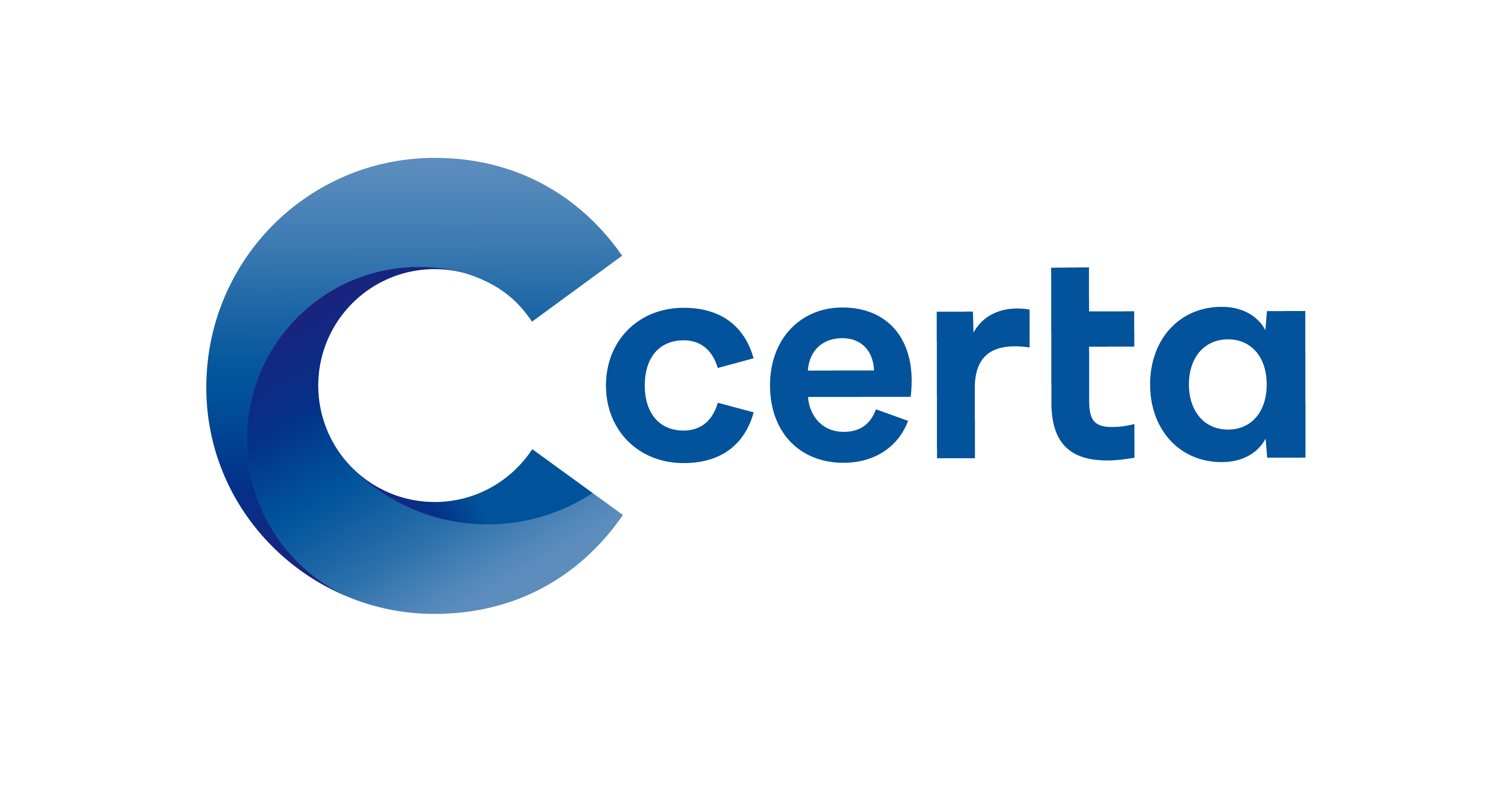
- Blue Certa Logo
- Formerly: Emo
- Type: Petrol station
- Predecessors: Tesco Ireland (unmanned service station business only), Emo Oil, Campus Oil, Jones Oil, CC Lubricants, Source Lubrication Solutions.
- Area served: Republic of Ireland, Northern Ireland (Under the Emo brand)
- Products: Hydrotreated Vegetable Oil (HVO), Kerosene, SFGO, Petrol, Diesel
- Owner: DCC Plc
- Website: certaireland.ie

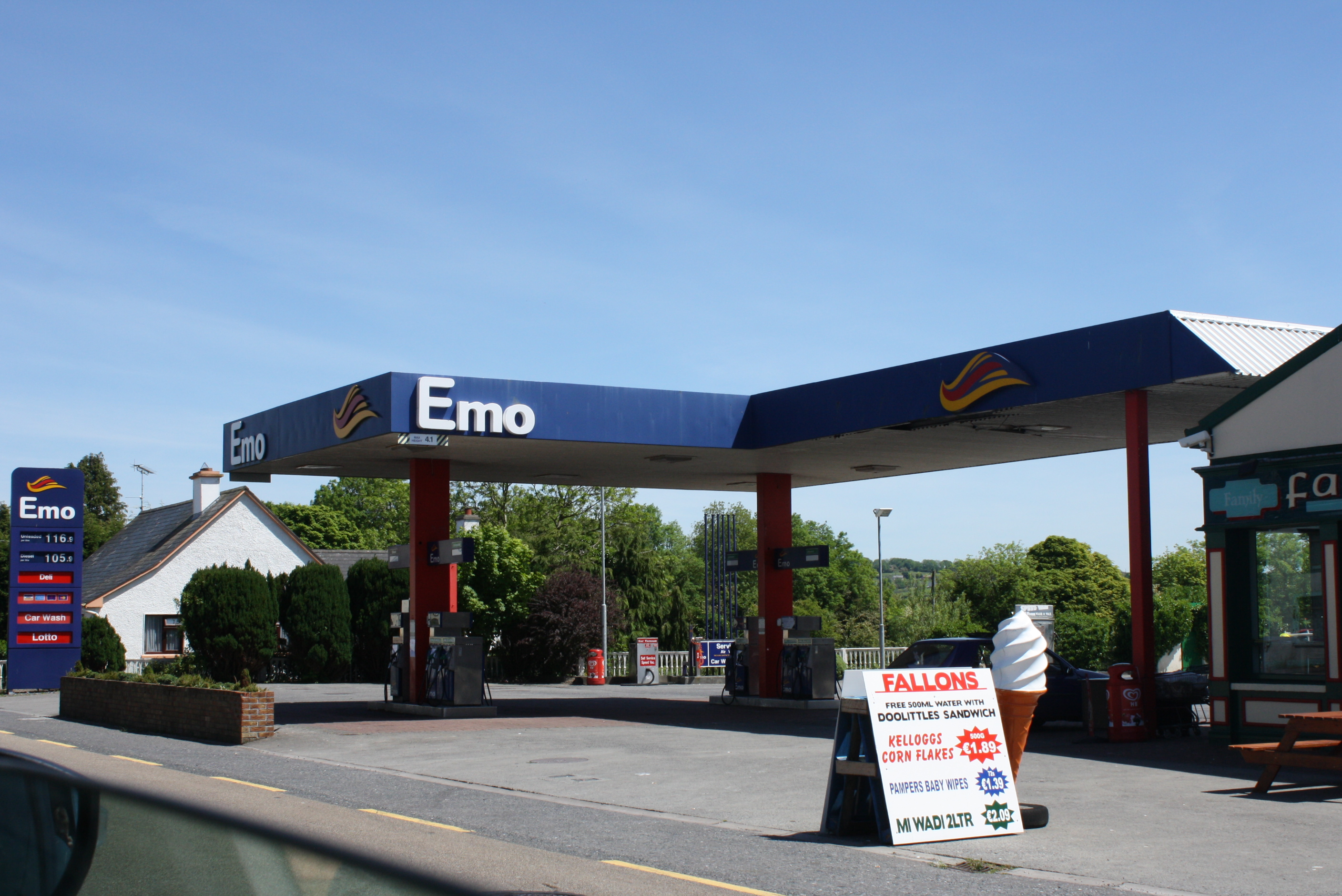
Emo station in County Sligo, Ireland

Certa Ireland is an Irish fuel and energy brand that is based in Portlaoise, Republic of Ireland. They operate in Northern Ireland under the Emo brand. Certa Ireland is owned by DCC Plc. The Certa brand was introduced in September 2022 out of the amalgamation of the former Irish brands, Jones Oil, Emo Oil, Campus Oil, CC Lubricants and Source Lubrication Solutions.

== Operations in the Republic of Ireland ==
DCC plc purchased the filling station operations of Tesco Ireland in 2020, which are now branded under Certa as part of its Pay @ Pump network.

== Operations in Northern Ireland ==
In 2011, DCC Energy bought Maxol Direct, the home heating side of Maxol in Northern Ireland, which was then incorporated into Emo Oil by 2012.

== Renewable Energy ==
In recent years Certa have expanded operations into renewable energy solutions, through the acquisition of Alternative Energy Ireland in 2023.

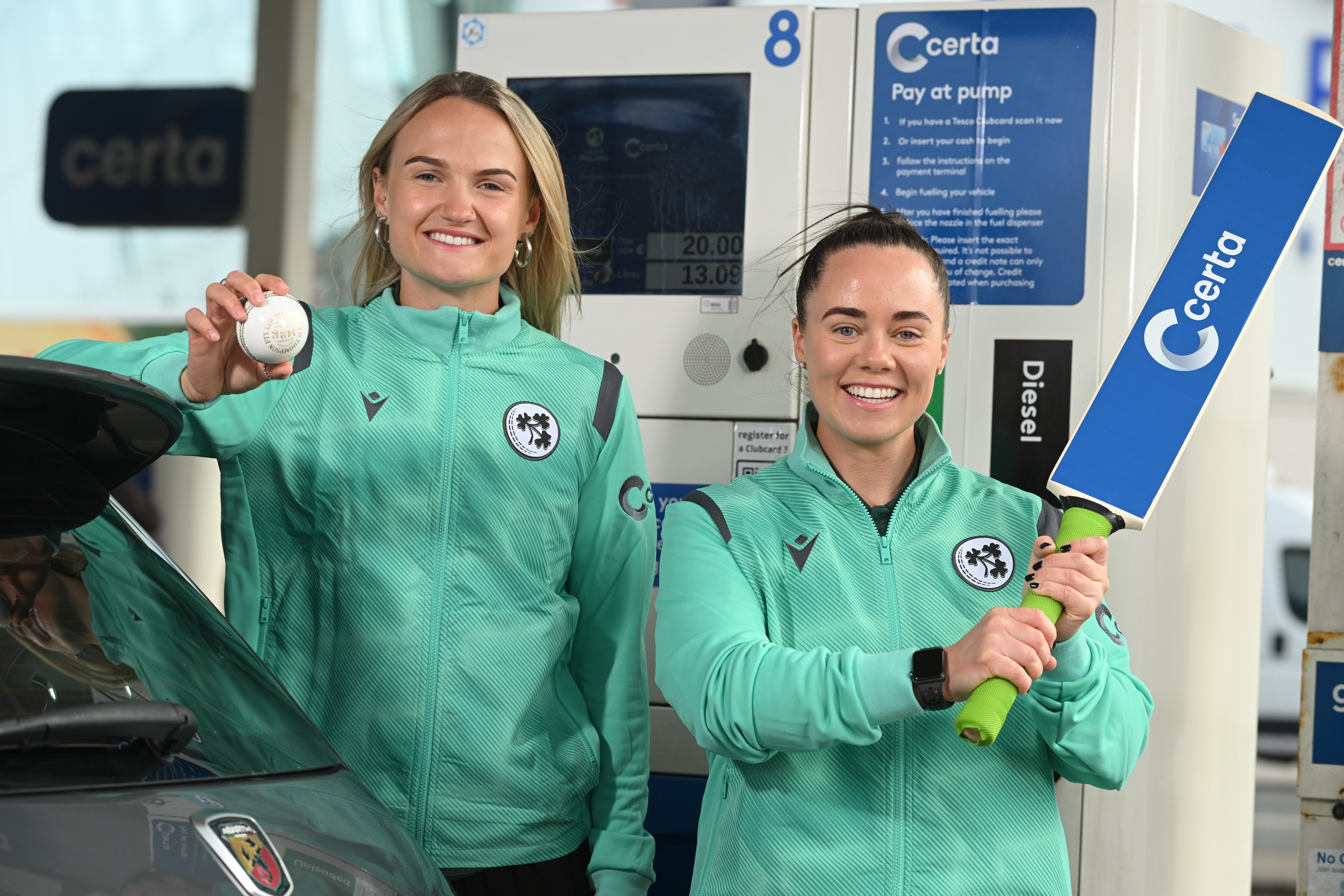
Certa Ireland Women's Cricket Sponsor
