= Palmer and Harvey =

Former UK retail wholesaler

Palmer and Harvey plc
- Company type: Private; Employee Owned
- Industry: Wholesale; Distribution; Retail
- Founded: 1925; 101 years ago
- Defunct: 2017
- Headquarters: P&H House, 106–112 Davigdor Road, Hove, East Sussex, England
- Area served: United Kingdom
- Key people: Tony Reed (chief executive officer); Martyn Ward (managing director – wholesale); Mark Leonard (group operations director); Jon Moxon (group finance director)
- Net income: £34 million
- Number of employees: 3,400
- Subsidiaries: Mace
- Website: www.palmerharvey.co.uk

Palmer and Harvey plc (also known as P&H, formerly Palmer & Harvey McLane plc) was a UK-based wholesaler that serviced the multiples and convenience sectors.

Headquartered in Hove, East Sussex, and privately owned, it was the UK's largest delivered wholesaler, and the 5th largest private company in the UK. It had an integrated national distribution network across 14 sites in the UK. The company was founded in 1925 as a traditional confectionery and tobacco wholesaler. Palmer and Harvey has been the UK's largest wholesaler working with a diverse range of 90,000 retailers.

On 28 November 2017, Palmer and Harvey fell into administration, with the immediate loss of 2,500 jobs, due in part to low profit margins and problems with working capital. A small number of staff were temporarily retained to assist in the orderly closure of the business.

== Business divisions ==
Palmer and Harvey had four business platforms: Distribution, Multiple Retail, Independent Retail and Wholesale. Each was aimed at the needs of a broad client base, supplying customers with a range of produce from fresh sandwiches to shoelaces.

=== Palmer and Harvey Wholesale and Distribution ===
Palmer and Harvey Wholesale and Distribution was the UK's largest wholesale distributor, supplying ambient, grocery, chilled and frozen foods, health and home products to a diverse range of retail outlets, including supermarkets, multiple forecourts and convenience store operators. Palmer and Harvey's customer base included Costcutter, Esso, Royal Dutch Shell, Total, Welcome Break, Moto and the grocery multiples Tesco and Sainsbury's. The company had grown significantly in 1968 with the purchase of part of the loss making wholesaling business of Cavenham Foods.

The loss of the partnership distribution contract for convenience chain McColl's (MMRG) to Morrisons in 2017 brought about the collapse of Palmer & Harvey into Administration.

=== Palmer and Harvey Retail Services ===
Palmer and Harvey owned WS Retail, a symbol group that operated under the Central Stores banner. The group was based in Ringwood, Hampshire.

=== Palmer and Harvey Direct Ltd ===
Palmer and Harvey Direct Ltd offered more than 50,000 smaller retailers an opportunity to buy from a range of products through the direct-to-door van delivery services P&H Snacksdirect, P&H Sweetdirect and P&H Direct.

== Company history ==
Palmer and Harvey underwent management buy outs in 2002 and 2008, the latter led by Chief Executive Chris Etherington in a deal which valued the business at £330m. The equity of Palmer and Harvey is held by current and former employees. Since 2008 almost £77 million was paid to senior employees before the company collapsed with debts of £65 million. Chris Etherington has faced calls to repay a £3.4 million loan he received from the company that would only normally be repayable if he sold his (now worthless) shares in the business. The failed company has a pension fund with a deficit of £80 million. The Sunday Times quoted PricewaterhouseCoopers as saying: “In line with their statutory responsibilities, the administrators will investigate the circumstances leading to the failure of the business in due course.”

== Company timeline ==
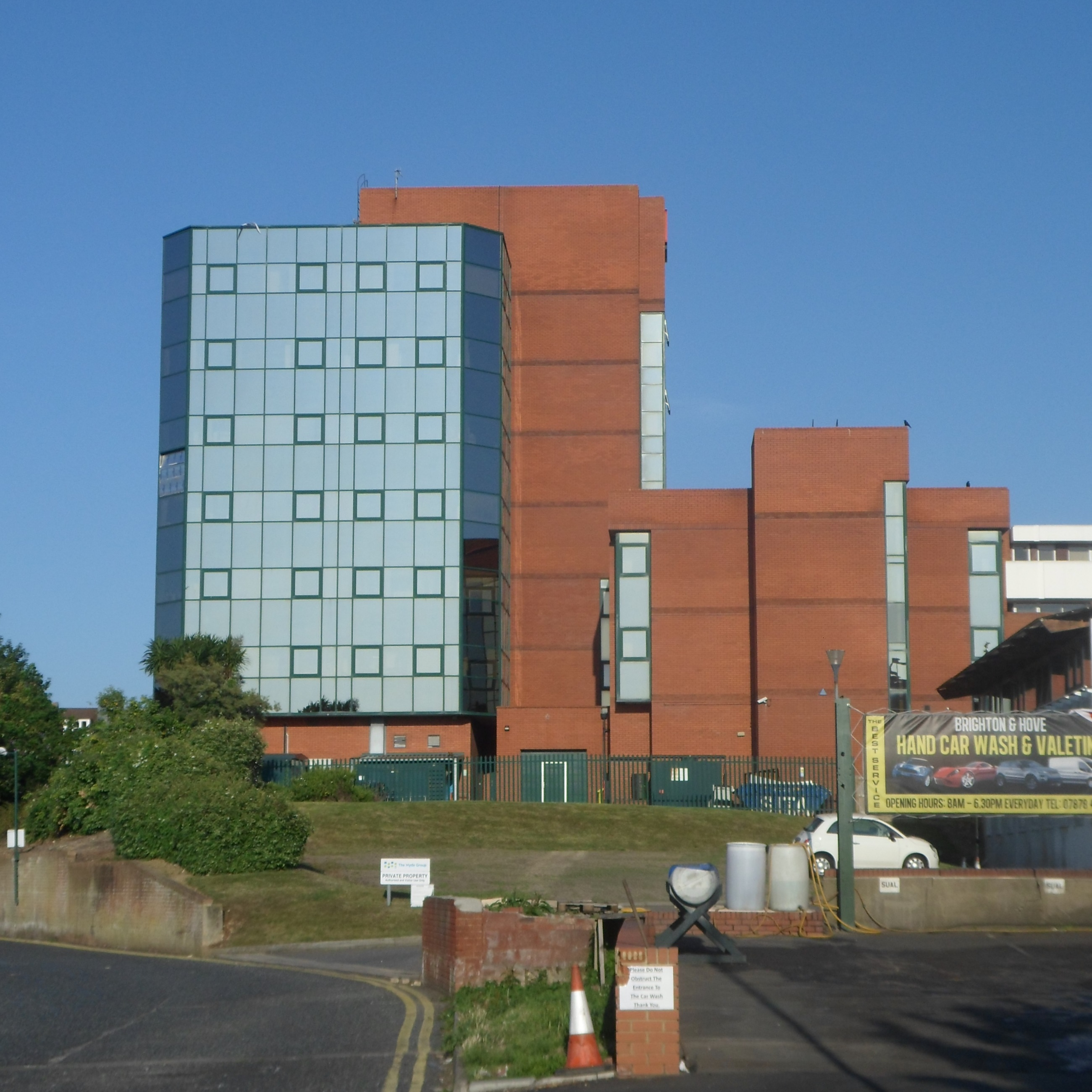
P&H House, the company's headquarters in Hove

- 1925 – Palmer and Harvey is founded by Archie Stone, who buys two wholesale businesses from a Mr Palmer and a Mr Harvey in North London and merges them into one.
- 1959 – Sir Don Gosling becomes a director after he marries Shauna Ingram, a member of the family which owns Palmer & Harvey.
- 1988 – Sir Don Gosling quits after his divorce, but returns after a management buyout.
- 1994 – P&H acquires McLane, the UK offshoot of the US business.
- 1995 – Mojo Cash & Carry and frozen food distributor Snowking Foods are acquired by P&H. Warehouse and fleet size are both increased.
- 1998 – Pro Retail, P&H's annual trade show, is launched and P&H acquires Winerite, a BWS wholesaler in Yorkshire running 650 BWS product lines.
- 1998 – P&H launches Your Store.
- 1999 – P&H sign a long term distribution contract with TM Retail Group and Snowking Foods is merged with the ambient arm of P&H business, supported by a 190,000 sq ft (18,000 m^{2}) multi-temperature depot in Coventry.
- 1999 – P&H sells the Select and Save brand name to Larnheath Ltd and acquires Booker Wholesale Foods from Booker plc. The symbol group Mace is included in this sale, giving P&H greater exposure in England and Wales.
- 2000 – P&H purchases YP Electronics, acquires Snacksdirect from KP McVities and acquires supplier status to 85 Esso forecourts.
- 2001 – P&H acquires a 200,000 sq ft (19,000 m^{2}) depot in Crawley, begins supplying to Sainsbury's petrol filling stations and secures a long term distribution with Shell UK Ltd to supply core and noncore food ranges.
- 2002 P&H undergoes a second management buyout.
- 2005 – P&H acquires the franchise for the Mace symbol group in Scotland from Somerfield, previously operated by Aberness Foods.
- 2006 – P&H wins the supply contract for the CTN chain Northcliffe Retail (supplying 66 company-owned stores and 250 retail partner stores) worth £75m a year; Chris Etherington is appointed as Chief Executive, joining P&H from motor parts wholesaler Unipart Automotive.
- 2007 – P&H acquires West Country delivered wholesaler T&A Symonds, a member of the Key Lekkerland Group.
- 2008 – P&H acquires Leeds-based delivered wholesaler WH & HM Young, a member of the Key Lekkerland Group, and launches its new Partnership Plus initiative to provide a tailored business growth package to independent and symbol group retailers.
- 2008 – P&H reaches £4bn in turnover; a third management buyout is completed, led by current chief executive Chris Etherington. The deal, valuing the business at £330m, offers 50% of its shares to management and employees.
- 2009 – P&H Launches Sweetdirect, a direct-to-store van sales operation selling products from Perfetti Van Melle, Tangerine Confectionery, Weetabix (until July 2012), Kelloggs Cereal Bars (from July 2012), Reckitt Benkiser Medicines, Lindt, Bon Bon Buddies and a variety of UK chocolate products.
- 2010 – P&H announces record sales of £4.2bn, with profit falling by 50% to £227,000.
- 2011 – P&H release Fuel Deserts, a research paper that looks into the state of the UK's forecourt industry.
- 2012 – P&H acquires the Walkers Van sales operation.
- August 2017 – Imperial Tobacco and JTI attempt to come to an agreement with P&H over the terms of a "rescue deal" to secure the company's future.
- October 2017 – P&H entered into talks with the Carlyle Group for the company's equity to be taken over by Carlyle.
- 28 November 2017 – Palmer and Harvey goes into administration, with the loss of 2,500 jobs, due to problems with working capital, high debt and a low profit margin, having earned in 2016 only £618,000 on sales of £2.5bn.
