= Mace (retailer) =

Convenience shop franchise

- The former Republic of Ireland logo
- Type: Convenience shop
- Founded: 1960 in Ireland
- Area served: Ireland; Northern Ireland
- Owner: Musgrave Retail Partners (Northern Ireland); BWG Foods (Republic of Ireland)

Mace is a name used by two convenience shop symbol groups in the Republic of Ireland and Northern Ireland. The shops are independently owned and join the groups, paying a fee for marketing and branding support and purchasing their stock from the brand owners.

== Great Britain ==
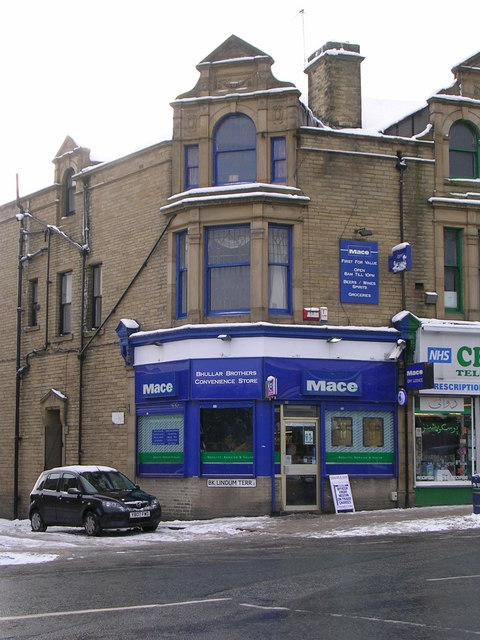
A Mace shop in Bradford, West Yorkshire

Mace Britain logo

The Mace brand had several owners in its history in Great Britain.

In 1999, Palmer and Harvey acquired Booker Wholesale Foods from Booker plc, giving P&H control of the Mace symbol group in England and Wales. A large number of retailers were unhappy with the change and 80 shops left soon after the takeover. Initially they were unable to satisfy customer expectations with one stating "I don't think they're geared up to serve our type of trade. They're more used to being 'a supplier', rather than 'the supplier'."

P&H acquired the entire rights to Mace throughout Great Britain in 2005, finally unifying the brand under one owner. This stability has allowed the brand to recover from defections by retailers caused by frequent disruptive changes of ownership of the brand in the past. This included acquiring the franchise for Mace in Scotland from Somerfield, previously operated by Aberness Foods until March 2004. Because the brand had three owners in such a short space of time, Mace retailers had experienced considerable disruption. Since the Somerfield takeover Mace "had been haemorrhaging independent retailers to other symbols since it bought Mace from Aberness". 25 shops defected to Spar during the takeover by P&H from Somerfield. From the early 2000s onwards, the brand gained a reputation for being overpriced. This later lead to the colloquial phrase “mace up price” being coined to refer to something overly expensive.

In 2013, Costcutter UK acquired the brand in Great Britain. In December 2020, Bestway Wholesale acquired symbol operator Costcutter Supermarkets Group for an undisclosed fee from Bibby Line Group. The Costcutter operations initially become part of Bestway's retail arm. This involved the integration of around 1,500 stores branded Costcutter, Mace, Supershop, Kwiksave and Simply Fresh, along with 20 Costcutter and four Co-op franchise stores.

In February 2022, Bestway Wholesale Managing Director Dawood Pervez indicated that it was considering consolidating all its symbol groups under four brands: Best-one, Costcutter, Bargain Booze and Wine Rack. This was confirmed in December 2022.

== Northern Ireland ==
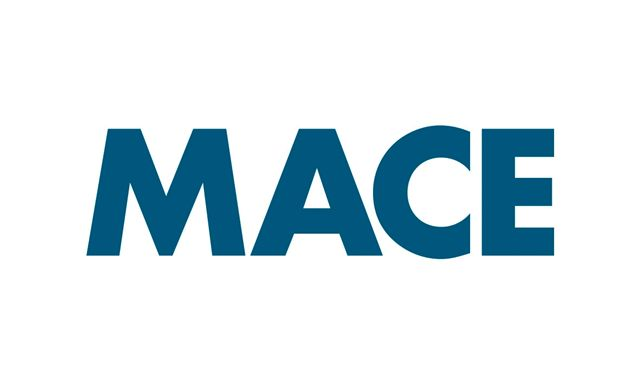
Mace NI logo

In Northern Ireland the brand is owned by Musgrave Retail Partners. They bought the brand when they purchased JJ Haslett in 2007. JJ Haslett had been an independent wholesaler since an MBO from BWG Foods in 2003.

There are approximately 200 Mace shops in Northern Ireland, some trading as Mace Express. Musgrave also own the Centra and Supervalu brands.

== Republic of Ireland ==
Mace Republic of Ireland logo, formerly used in Northern Ireland and the Republic until 2009

Mace has traded in Ireland since 1960 and is Ireland's oldest franchise convenience shop. In the beginning there were over a dozen wholesalers operating the brand.

Mace in the Republic of Ireland is now owned entirely by BWG Foods. Previously the rights to the brands have been split with Mangans Wholesale and Vantage Holdings owning certain regional rights. In 2000 BWG bought the Mace rights belonging to Vantage Holdings and in 2008 BWG Bought out the entire Mangans Group. These purchases finally consolidated the brand in Ireland under one owner. In the Republic, BWG services about 240 shops across its supermarket, food shop and forecourt formats. BWG also owns the Spar and XL brands in Ireland.

In Ireland, north and south, the Mace shops offer a more advanced range of in-shop services than their counterparts in Great Britain. Almost all shops offer hot food "to go" and hot "bean to cup" beverages. The shops are also typically larger, with smaller shops in Northern Ireland branded Mace Express. Shops of this size in the Republic would be branded XL rather than Mace.

BWG had an exclusive agreement with Maxol to brand all Maxol petrol station forecourt convenience shops in the Republic of Ireland as "Maxol Mace". This is no longer used as of 2024 and Maxol now uses its own brand in partnership with BWG.
