= Abrakebabra =

Irish fast food restaurant

- Type: Private
- Industry: Restaurant
- Founder: Wynn Beere; Graeme Beere
- Headquarters: Ireland
- Number of locations: 24 (2025)
- Area served: Ireland
- Key people: Graeme Beere, David Zebedee
- Owner: BWG Foods
- Parent: Abrakebabra Investments Limited (AIL Group)
- Website: abrakebabra.com

Abrakebabra /ˈæbrəkəˈbæbrə/ is an Irish fast-food restaurant chain established in Dublin, Ireland in 1982.

When the first Abrakebabra restaurant was opened in Rathmines in Dublin it attracted huge attention catering to late-night crowds with a fresh menu that included introducing the doner kebab to the Irish market.

As of 2025, there are 24 Abrakebabra restaurants in total, 13 of which are in Dublin.

In June 2026, Abrakebabra and other subsidiaries of the AIL Group were sold to SPAR South Africa via its subsidiary BWG Foods.

== Cards ==
The Abrakebabra Gold Card (AKA Doner Card) allows the recipient free food for life. It is sent unexpectedly, when a public figure expresses their interest or relationship with the brand. Singer Cheryl Cole received a gold card after telling a radio station that Abrakebabra's kebabs were the best. Actor Colin Farrell stated in an interview that he and Irish musician Bono also have gold cards.

Farrell stated in a Jimmy Kimmel interview that he was upgraded to a black card with the serial number 001.

== Gallery ==
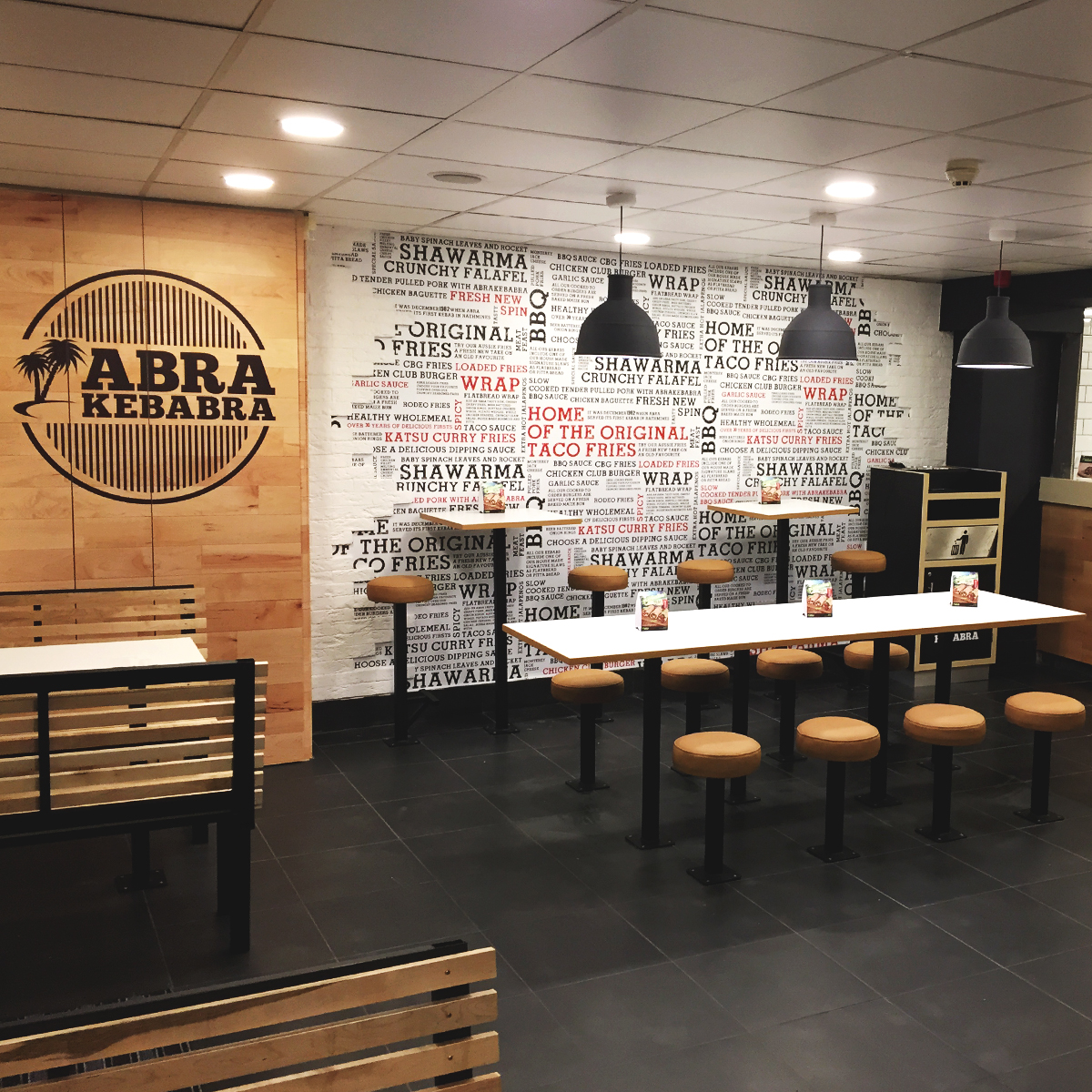
Abrakebabra Seating Area

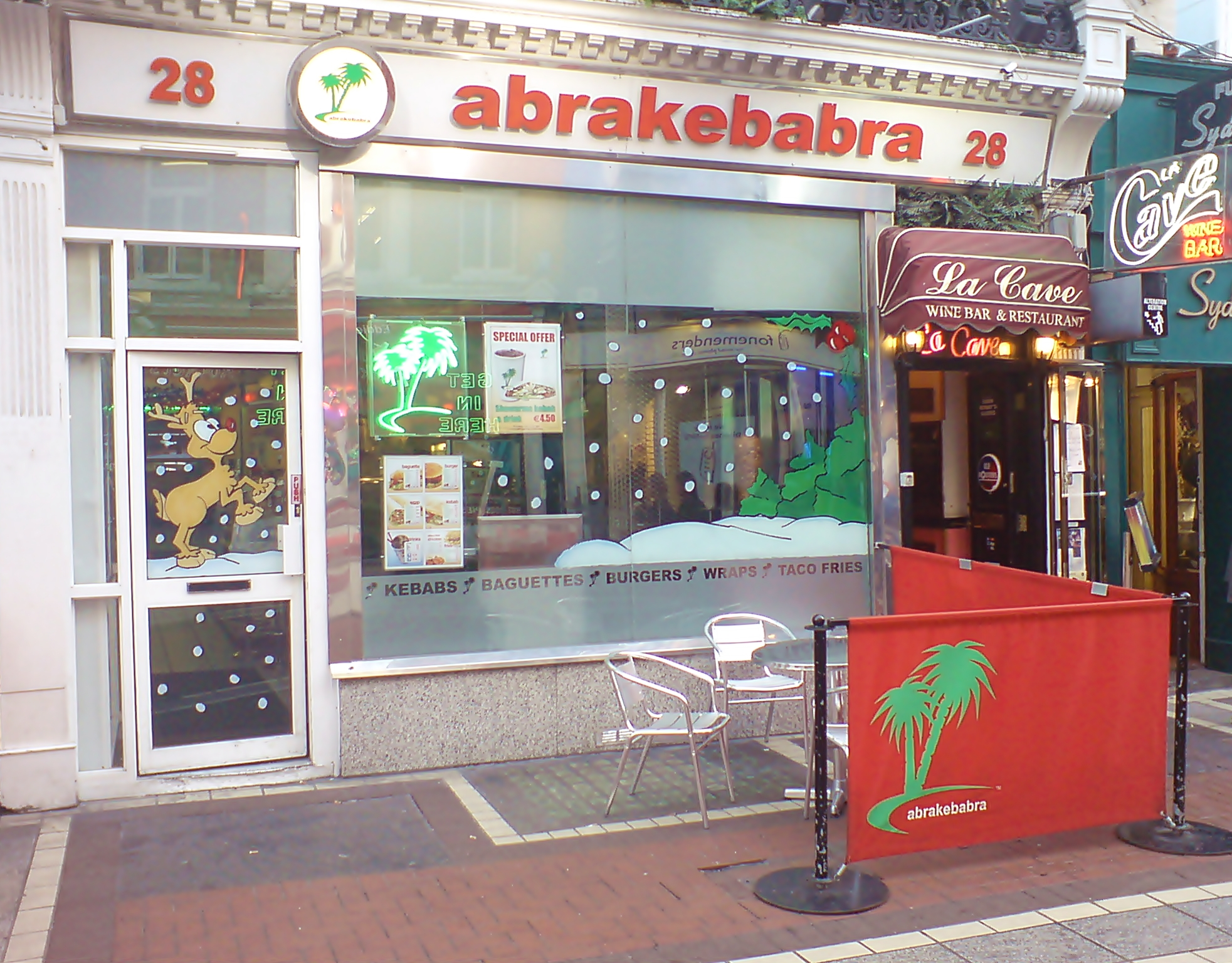
Abrakebra restaurant on South Anne Street, Dublin

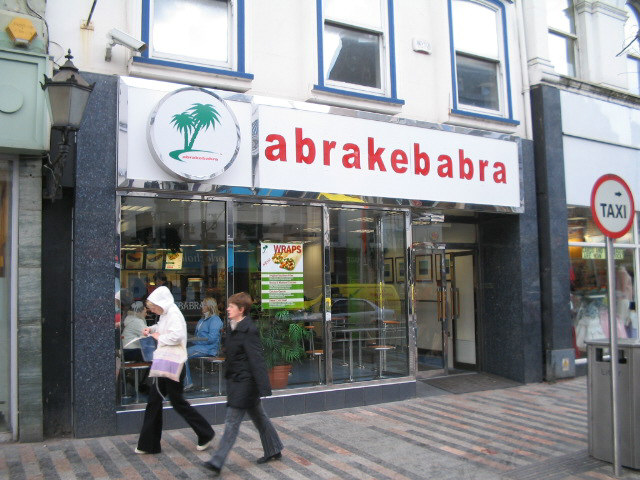
Abrakebra restaurant in Cork

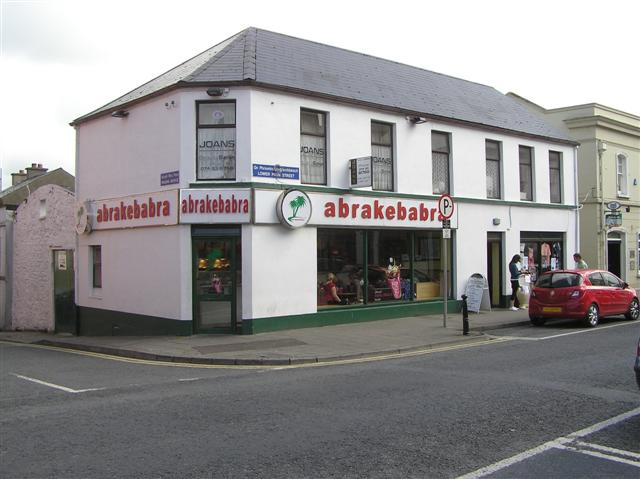
Abrakebabra in Buncrana
