= Gala (supermarket) =

Irish convenience store chain

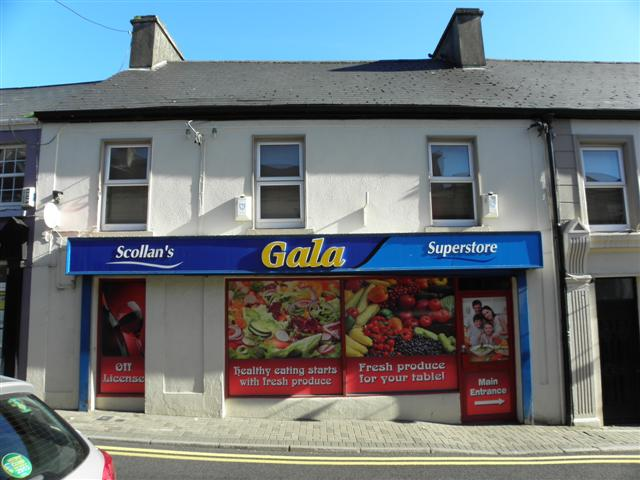
- A Gala branded shop in Drumshanbo, County Leitrim
- Founded: 1998; 28 years ago
- Headquarters: Ireland
- Number of locations: 250 (2022)
- Area served: Ireland
- Key people: Gary Desmond
- Website: www.gala.ie

Gala is a convenience shop chain in Ireland. Established in 1998, as of 2021 Gala had approximately 250 shops nationwide, all under franchise. The symbol group is supplied by a number of independent wholesalers which were formerly part of the National Wholesale group (now known as Stonehouse). In 2008, the brand recognised its tenth year in business. Gary Desmond is the chief executive officer.

== History ==
In 1998, the National Wholesale Grocers Alliance, a buying group of independent cash and carry outlets, launched Gala Retail Services Limited. The launch represented an attempt to replicate models operated by the BWG Foods' Spar chain and the Musgrave-owned Centra chain. It followed the entry of Costcutter, a UK-based convenience store group, to the Irish market.

As of 2005, Gala was operating stores under three brands: "Gala", "Gala Superstore" and "Checkout". In 2019, the group began the changeover of "Checkout" branded stores to a new facia called "Your Stop".

Gala Retail Services Limited coordinates the franchise services for the retailers such as central billing, store development, fresh food advice, marketing, training and information technology, while wholesale members supply stores with goods.

From 2018 to 2023, BWG Foods acquired three Gala wholesale members, including 4 Aces Wholesale and Tuffys Wholesale, and is now the largest supplier to the symbol group.

== Sponsorship ==
Gala sponsors Gradam Chumarsáide an Oireachtais, and the Irish Special Olympics Team.

The company previously sponsored the All-Ireland Senior Camogie Championship from 2006 until early 2011.
