= SuperValu (Ireland) =

Irish supermarket chain

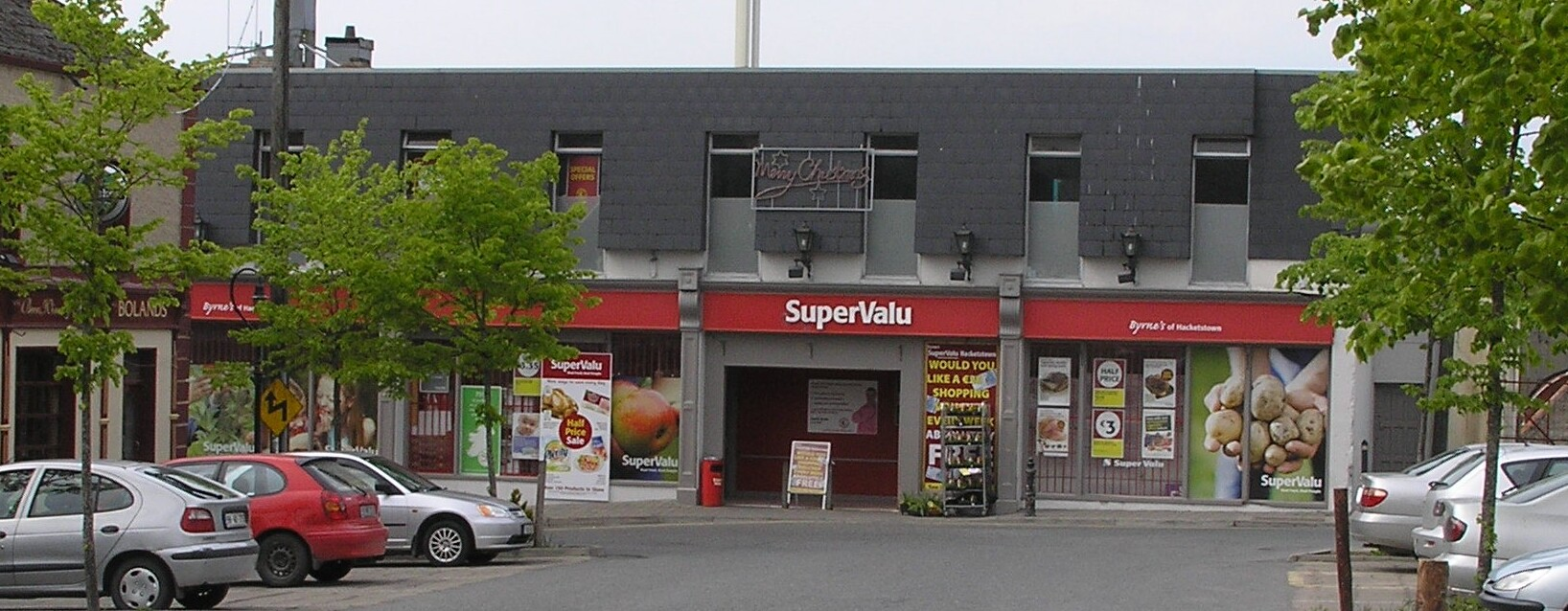
- SuperValu Hacketstown
- Type: Subsidiary
- Industry: Retail
- Predecessor: VG (Voluntary Group)
- Founded: 27 June 1968; 58 years ago in Douglas, Cork
- Headquarters: Cork, Ireland
- Number of locations: 258 (2025)
- Areas served: Republic of Ireland; Northern Ireland; Spain
- Key people: Luke Hanlon (managing director)
- Revenue: €2.58 billion (2014)
- Number of employees: 14,500 (2015)
- Parent: Musgrave Group
- Website: SuperValu.ie

SuperValu is a supermarket chain that operates throughout the island of Ireland. SuperValu is operated as a symbol group; each supermarket is independently owned, with individual owners using the SuperValu format and selling the chain's own brand products. SuperValu outlets tend to be larger than the convenience shop formats used by many other symbol group retailers such as Centra, Gala and Spar, and the larger SuperValu units are on a par with full-service supermarkets. Their main competitors are Dunnes Stores and Tesco.

== History ==
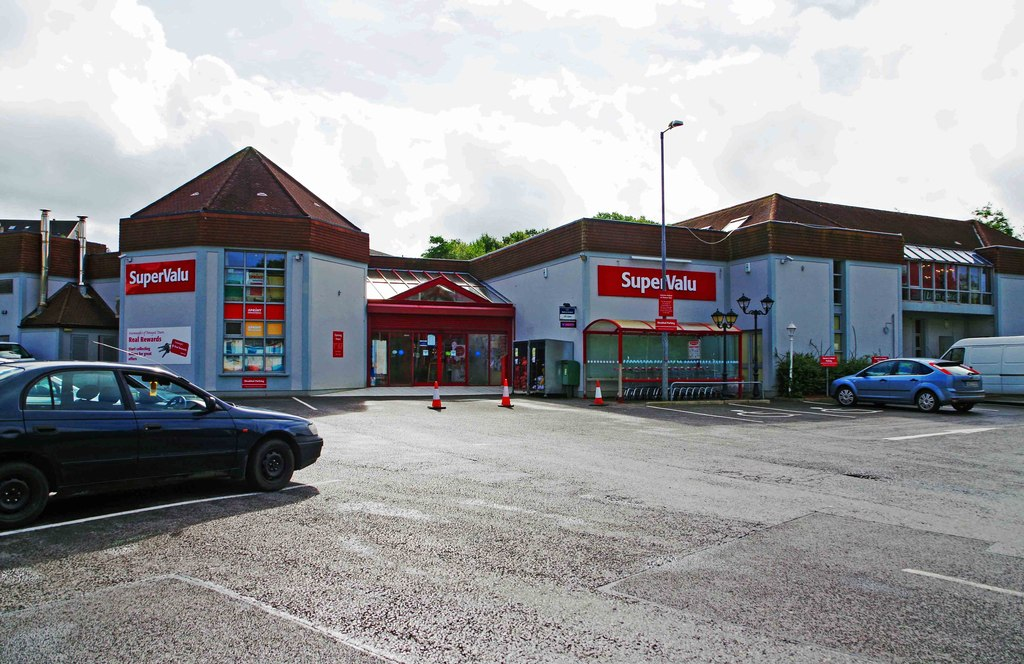
SuperValu, The Glebe, Donegal Town

The supermarket was founded on 27 June 1968 out of the larger outlets in Musgrave's VG chain (originally formed in 1960). The smaller VG shops became Centra. From a base of sixteen supermarkets (mainly in Munster), SuperValu had 182 shops in the Republic of Ireland and 36 in Northern Ireland as of 2004. Along the way, Musgrave has pursued a policy of buying shops itself and then re-leasing them to franchisees, acquiring some of the insolvent H Williams shops in 1987, L&N in 1995, and Wellworths (in Northern Ireland) in 1996.

Wellworths-SuperValu was a trading name used briefly by Musgrave in Northern Ireland following its acquisition of small-to-medium Wellworths outlets in 1996. This was to distinguish from larger Wellworths supermarkets which were acquired by Safeway Stores (Ireland), a joint venture between Fitzwilton and Safeway (UK). In due course, the Wellworths name was entirely dropped.

SuperValu previously operated supermarkets in larger Roches Stores locations under the name "SuperValu at Roches Stores" for many years.

Superquinn was bought by the Musgrave Group, parent of SuperValu, in 2011. In August 2013, it was announced that all Superquinn supermarkets would be rebranded to SuperValu. The rebranding was completed in February 2014. As a result, SuperValu became the second-largest supermarket chain in the Republic of Ireland by grocery spend.

SuperValu's stores in Spain are branded as Dialprix, Musgrave's Spanish business. Due to this, the SuperValu brand name no longer exists in Spain.

== See also ==
- Centra
- Gala
- Spar
- Superquinn
- Musgrave Group
- List of Irish companies
