= Londis (Ireland) =

Irish convenience store chain

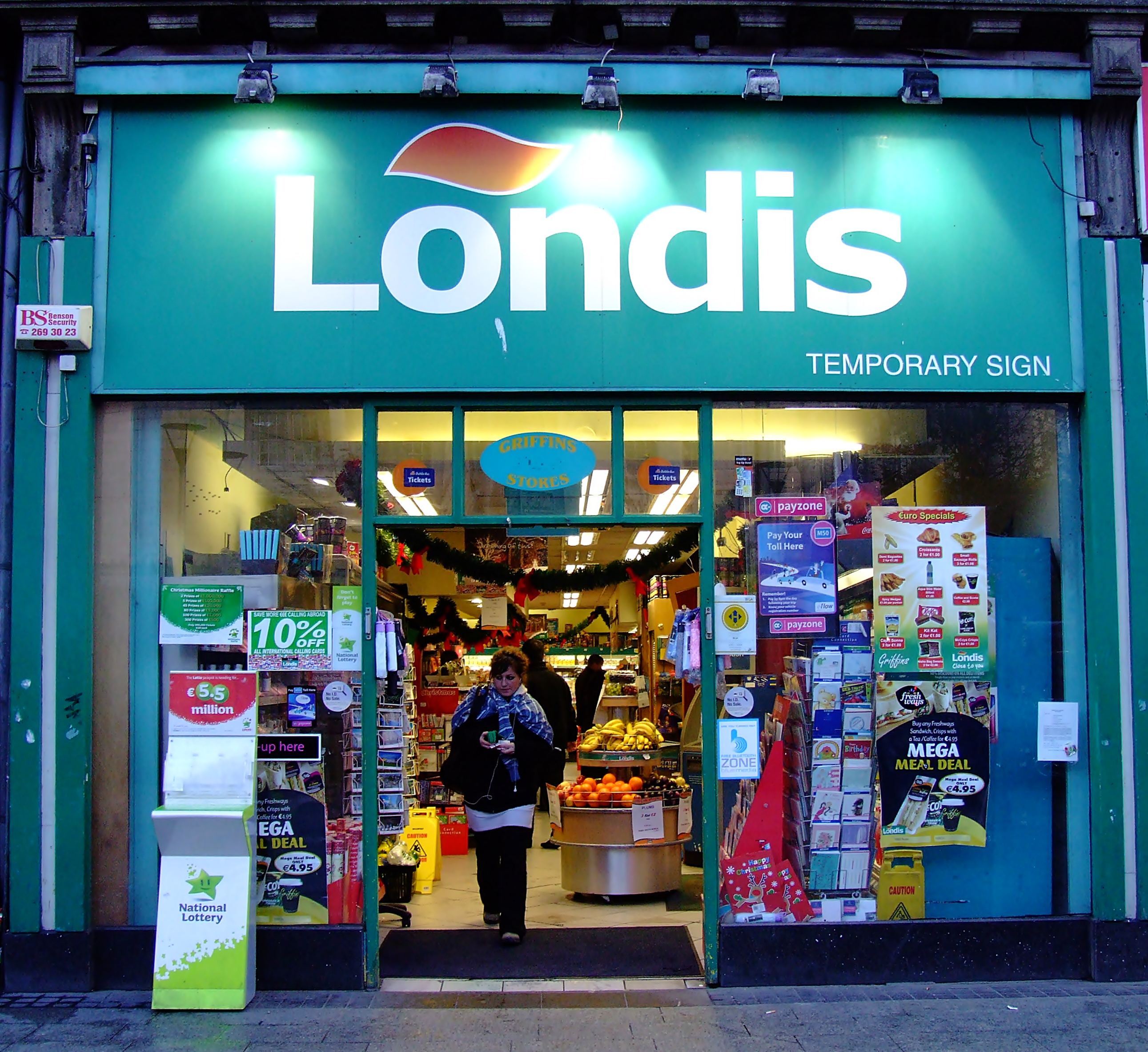
- Type: Private
- Industry: Retail
- Founded: 1970
- Area served: Ireland
- Products: Groceries

Londis is a chain of convenience shop franchises operating in Ireland. The stores form a symbol group and are all owned on a franchise basis.

The parent company for Londis Ireland is wholesaler retail grocery franchise operator BWG Foods UC. In December 2012, the company has an estimated net worth of £319 million.

== Operations ==
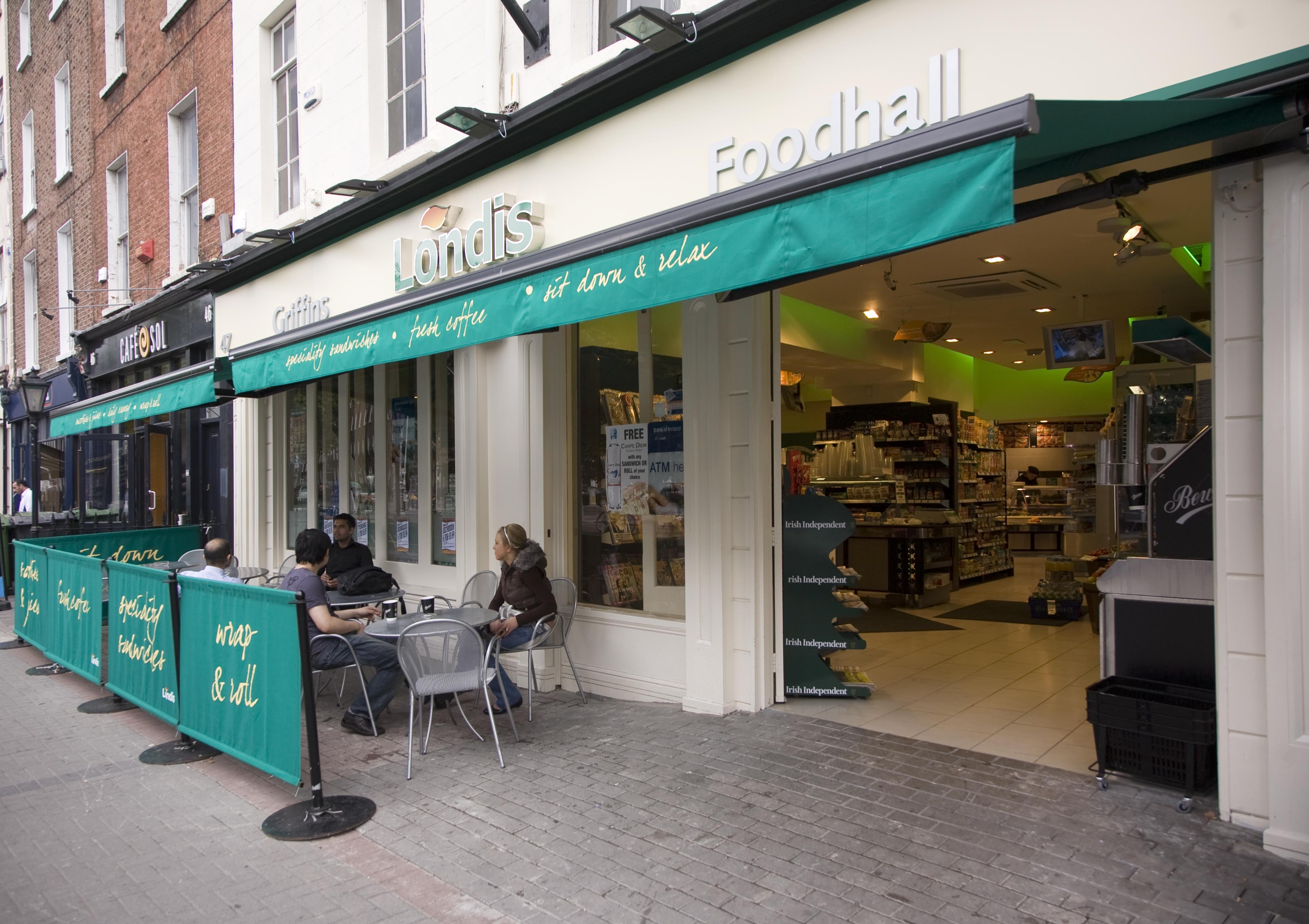
Londis, Dublin (2007)

In Ireland, the Londis format is controlled by grocer-owned wholesaler ADM Londis plc.

Allied Dublin Merchants was a co-operative of grocers in Ireland founded in 1954. Its subsidiary, ADM Londis Ltd, began in 1970 when it acquired the Londis master franchise for Ireland. In 1995, it bought the rights to the brand for the island of Ireland outright. Its only remaining link with Londis UK is the name. A 1975 name change to Allied Distributive Merchants preceded the 2005 formation of ADM Londis plc.

ADM Londis describes itself as a retailers' co-operative and its members own 360 stores. Changing from a legal co-operative to an unlisted public limited company in 2004, ADM Londis also claims to be the only Irish symbol group where retailers can own the company through share holdings and realise the value in their shares at market price.

From 1998 to 2004, a number of petrol stations in Ireland had Londis–branded forecourt stores, as part of an agreement with Tedcastles Oil Products (TOP), a major Irish fuel retailer. These stores, and several main street stores owned by TOP Petrol Stations, were called Londis Topshop. In 2004 however, ADM Londis and TOP dissolved their agreement. ADM then acquired the jointly owned Londis Topshop stores and rebranded them as Londis, using the opportunity to rebrand the stores with the new Londis logo.

ADM Londis was acquired by BWG (owner of Spar Franchise in Ireland) in 2015 for €23m.
