= Musgrave Group =

Irish food wholesaler

Musgrave Group Ltd.
- Formerly: Musgrave Brothers Ltd.
- Type: Private
- Industry: Wholesale
- Founded: 1876; 150 years ago
- Founder: Thomas and Stuart Musgrave
- Headquarters: Cork, Ireland
- Area served: Ireland; Spain
- Key people: Noel Keeley (CEO)
- Products: Groceries, fresh food, etc.
- Revenue: €5.2 billion (2024)
- Owner: Musgrave family (76%); Senior executives and Financial Institutions (24%)
- Website: musgravegroup.com

Musgrave Group Ltd. is an Irish food wholesaler, founded in Cork by the Musgrave brothers, Thomas and Stuart in 1876. It is currently Ireland's largest grocery distributor, with operations in Ireland and Spain with estimated annual sales of over €4 billion. The current CEO (as of 2019) is Noel Keeley. Today, the company is still largely owned by the Musgrave family.

== Divisions ==
The overall business is currently made up of four divisions:

- Musgrave Group is the controlling company of Musgrave, headquartered at Ballycurreen, County Cork, Ireland.
- Musgrave Retail Partners Ireland operates, mostly on a symbol group model, the Centra and SuperValu supermarkets in both the Republic of Ireland and Northern Ireland, and the Mace brand in Northern Ireland. This division is headquartered at the Tramore Road in Cork. This is also the site of one of three distribution centres, the others being in Kilcock, County Kildare and one in Belfast to service Northern Ireland. They closed a centre in Galway in 2010.
- Musgrave Wholesale Partners operates the Musgrave MarketPlace cash and carries, Daybreak convenience shops, Day-Today & XL Stop and Shop (Northern Ireland only) convenience shops and Musgrave Foodservices. This division is headquartered at Ballymun, Dublin. There are Marketplace sites in Cork, Waterford, Limerick, Galway, Ballymun, Dún Laoghaire and Clondalkin in the Republic of Ireland. There are also three Marketplace branches in Northern Ireland in Belfast, Derry and Lurgan.
- Musgrave Retail Partners España operates from a base in Elche in south-east of Spain, and operates Dialsur, and a Cash & Carry chain.

The small Donnybrook Fair chain of premium supermarkets was bought in 2018 but is not expected to be integrated with the existing brands.

== Former divisions ==
- Musgrave Operating Partners Ireland operated the Superquinn chain from July 2011 until 13 February 2014, when all stores became SuperValu.
- Musgrave Retail Partners GB operated the Londis stores and Budgens supermarkets in the United Kingdom until it was sold to Booker Group in 2015.

== See also ==
- List of Irish companies
- SuperValu
- Superquinn
- Centra
