= List of companies listed on Euronext Dublin =

This is a list of companies that have (or had) their primary listing on Euronext Dublin, based in Dublin or its predecessor the Irish Stock Exchange. Many of these companies have secondary listings on other stock exchanges.

Company	Sector	Ticker symbol	Year delisted (if no longer listed)
Aer Lingus		AERL	2015
AIB Group		A5G	
Aquila		AERI	
Bank of Ireland		BIRG	
C&C Group		GCC	2019
Cairn Homes		C5H	
Conroy Gold and Natural Resources		CNGR	
Corre Energy		CORRE	
CPL Resources			
CRH		DD8A	2023
Dalata Hotel Group		DHG	
Datalex		DLE	
DCC		DCC	2013
Donegal Investment Group		DQ7A	
Eircom		EIR	2006
FBD Holdings		EG7	
FD Technologies		GYQ	
Flutter Entertainment		FLTR	2024
Glanbia		GL9	
Glenveagh Property		GVR	
Grafton Group		GFTU	2013
Great Western Mining		8GW	
Greencoat Renewables		GRP	
Greencore		GCG	2012
Hammerson		HMSO	
Hostelworld Group		HSW	
IAWS Group		YZA	2021
Mediahuis Ireland		IPDC	2019
Irish Continental Group		IR5B	
Irish Residential Properties REIT		IRES	
Kenmare Resources		KMR	
Kerry Group		KRZ	
Kingspan Group		KRX	
Malin		MLC	
McInerney Holdings		A5G	2010
Mincon Group		MIO	
Molten Ventures		GRW	
Origin Enterprises		OIZ	
Ovoca Bio		OVXA	
PTSB		PTSB	
Ryanair		RYA	
Smurfit Westrock		SK3	2024
Uniphar		UPR	
UTV Media			
Zamano			

== See also ==
- ISEQ 20
- ISEQ Smallcaps
