= ISEQ Smallcaps =

The ISEQ Smallcaps index is a benchmark stock market index composed of companies that trade on the Euronext Dublin. The index comprises the smaller companies contained within the ISEQ Overall Index. The Small Cap Index represents an asset class of its own, i.e. the smaller quoted companies. This type of asset class offers potential for growth which may not always seen in larger entities. It also represents an attractive asset class from the portfolio theory perspective; i.e. diversification into chosen smaller capitalisation stocks is likely to improve the risk return equation for investors.

Due to the nature of the index prices of shares of the ISEQ Smallcaps are more volatile: as trading volumes and liquidity are smaller compared to the ISEQ 20 or ISEQ Overall stocks changes in prices (in percentage) can be much greater than with the more liquid and higher volume shares.

== Inclusion criteria and other rules ==
Originally only stocks that were part of the ISEQ Overall index on 4 January 1999 and a market capitalisation at that date of € 400.000.000 or less were included in the list. For shares that were floated on the ISEQ after the date of 04-01-1999 the following criteria must be met to be included in the Smallcaps index:

- Companies must be eligible for inclusion in ISEQ Overall Index
- Companies which are included in the ISEQ 20 Index are excluded
- Companies must have a market capitalisation of less than or equal to the current SCI Market Cap Threshold

If a company de-lists or is removed from the ISEQ then it will also be excluded from this index. Also if the shares are included in the ISEQ 20 index they will be removed from the Smallcaps index.

=== Index base date and value ===
The index is based on the value of the underlying shares on 4 January 1999 and the index was set at 1.000. Publication of this index started on 1 December 1999.

=== Listing review ===
The listing of companies in this index is reviewed every 3 months: March, June, September and December.

== Constituents ==
As of March 2014, the list comprised the following companies:

- Abbey Plc.
- Allied Irish Banks
- AMINEX Plc.
- Conroy Gold and Natural Resources
- CPL Resources Plc.
- Datalex
- Donegal Investment Group
- Fastnet Oil & Gas
- First Derivatives
- Great Western Mining Corporation
- IFG Group
- Independent News & Media
- Karelian Diamond Resources
- Mainstay Medical International Plc
- Merrion Pharmaceuticals
- Mincon Group
- Ormonde Mining
- OVOCA Gold
- Permanent TSB Group Holdings
- Petroneft Resources
- Prime Active Capital
- UTV Media
- Zamano
