= Liam Carroll (businessman) =

Irish businessman (1950–2021)

- Born: 1 September 1950; Dundalk
- Died: 2 March 2021 (aged 70)
- Occupation: Property developer
- Known for: Zoe Group, Dunloe Ewart, Construction of Dublin apartments

Liam Carroll (1 September 1950 – 2 March 2021) was an Irish property developer and businessperson known for his involvement in the Irish construction industry via his development company, Zoe Developments Group from the 1990s up to the time of the Irish property crash and the ultimate collapse of the group. Carroll often featured in the media despite his reclusive manner while his relatively frugal and reserved behaviour contrasted markedly with other public figures and property developers of the era.

== Zoe Developments group ==
Carroll became well known during the Celtic Tiger years of the late 1990s-2007 for residential and commercial property construction projects with a focus on large scale apartment developments in Dublin city centre. His apartments were notable for their high volume, low price point and small floor plan which appealed to younger owner occupiers and the less well-off sections of society.

Carroll also tended to build on inner-city brownfield or derelict sites in what other developers considered "unfashionable areas". This reputation earned Carroll the sobriquet of the Shoebox King from his detractors, including most notably the Irish Times journalist Frank McDonald, while his supporters emphasised the affordability of the apartments, the rejuvenation of previously downtrodden areas and the effect of bringing young people back into the city centre.

== Corporate investments ==
Carroll's wealth was estimated for a time to be in excess of €1 billion. He later became one of Ireland's leading corporate raiders and held large stakes in many public companies including Irish Continental Group, Greencore, FBD Holdings, Jurys Doyle and McInerney Holdings PLC ostensibly in an attempt to gain access to valuable development sites owned by these companies.

In 2000, he started building a stake in listed property developer Dunloe Ewart plc. In 2002 he completed his takeover of the company through his investment vehicle Rambridge Ltd for €196.5 million.

== Decline and legacy ==
Zoe group companies became unable to repay bank borrowings of a reported €1.3bn and in summer 2009 requested Examinership as protection from their creditors, including ACCBank who were the first to seek a winding up order. Following a series of cases, this was rejected by both the High Court and the Supreme Court of Ireland with the rescue plan described by a judge as bordering, if not trespassing on the fanciful and the appointment of liquidators to group companies was confirmed by the courts on 14 October 2009.

Following Zoe Development Group's decline, apartments constructed by the group have since been sold off by NAMA and through receivership processes and ultimately acquired by private buyers, state agencies and various international property funds including Irish Residential Properties REIT, Kennedy Wilson, Green REIT and Hines.
