= ISEQ 20 =

Irish stock market index

The Ireland Overall Stock Exchange Index, commonly shortened to ISEQ 20 (/ˈaɪzɛk/ EYE-zek), is a benchmark stock market index composed of companies that trade on Euronext Dublin. The index comprises the 20 companies with the highest trading volume and market capitalisation contained within the ISEQ Overall Index. The index was started on 31 December 2004 at a base of 1,000 points. The Irish Overall Index has a longer history and is more often used for comparing the performance of the Irish stocks for a longer period.

Due to the "Celtic Tiger" economy the index rose to just over 1500 points in April 2007, before declining sharply in the Irish financial crisis to under 300 points, since when it has recovered to over 1000 points.

Since 2005 the ISEQ 20 index is covered by an ETF contract; other ETFs are also listed on the ISE.

== Constituents ==
As of July 2026:

| MNEM code | Company | Domicile |
|---|---|---|
| Euronext Dublin: A5G | AIB Group | Ireland |
| Euronext Dublin: BIRG | Bank of Ireland | Ireland |
| Euronext Dublin: C5H | Cairn Homes | Ireland |
| Euronext Dublin: DQ7A | Donegal investment group | Ireland |
| Euronext Dublin: EG7 | FBD Holdings | Ireland |
| Euronext Dublin: GL9 | Glanbia | Ireland |
| Euronext Dublin: GVR | Glenveagh Properties | Ireland |
| Euronext Dublin: GRP | Greencoat Renewables | Ireland |
| Euronext Dublin: HMSO | Hammerson plc | U.K |
| Euronext Dublin: IR5B | Irish Continental Group | Ireland |
| Euronext Dublin: IRES | Irish Residential Properties REIT | Ireland |
| Euronext Dublin: KMR | Kenmare Resources | Ireland |
| Euronext Dublin: KRZ | Kerry Group | Ireland |
| Euronext Dublin: KRX | Kingspan Group | Ireland |
| Euronext Dublin: MLC | Malin Corp. | Ireland |
| Euronext Dublin: MIO | Mincon group | Ireland |
| Euronext Dublin: OIZ | Origin Enterprises | Ireland |
| Euronext Dublin: PTSB | Permanent TSB | Ireland |
| Euronext Dublin: RY4C | Ryanair Holdings | Ireland |
| Euronext Dublin: UPR | Uniphar | Ireland |

== Previous constituents ==
| Date | 2 January 2007 | 19 October 2009 | 5 November 2010 | 16 December 2011 | 30 March 2012 |
|---|---|---|---|---|---|
| 1 | Allied Irish Banks 16.69% | Allied Irish Banks 7.3% | Allied Irish Banks 0.74% | Aer Lingus Group 0.41% | Aer Lingus Group 0.51% |
| 2 | Anglo Irish Bank 9.12% | Aryzta 6.3% | Aryzta 7.48% | Aryzta 8.25% | Aryzta 7.51% |
| 3 | Bank of Ireland 12.73% | Bank of Ireland 8.0% | Bank of Ireland 4.39% | Bank of Ireland 3.81% | Bank of Ireland 4.5% |
| 4 | CRH 16.94% | CRH 20.1% | CRH 21.34% | CRH 20.86% | CRH 18.5% |
| 5 | C&C Group 1.8% | C&C Group 2.6% | C&C Group 3.37% | C&C Group 2.55% | C&C Group 2.89% |
| 6 | DCC 1.91% | DCC 4.5% | DCC 5.54% | DCC 4.37% | DCC 3.7% |
| 7 | Élan Corporation 9.58% | Dragon Oil 3.5% | Dragon Oil 4.02% | Dragon Oil 3.86% | Dragon Oil 4.26% |
| 8 | FBD Holdings 0.61% | Élan Corporation 6.5% | Élan Corporation 5.85% | Élan Corporation 12.30% | Élan Corporation 12.41% |
| 9 | Grafton Group 1.87% | FBD Holdings 0.5% | Glanbia 1.48% | Glanbia 1.66% | FBD Holdings 0.47% |
| 10 | Greencore 0.84% | Glanbia 1.2% | Grafton Group 1.99% | Grafton Group 1.33% | Glanbia 1.78% |
| 11 | IAWS Group 2.57% | Grafton Group 2.3% | Greencore 0.7% | Greencore 0.70% | Grafton Group 1.50% |
| 12 | Independent News & Media 1.38% | Greencore 0.7% | ICON plc 2.44% | Independent News & Media 0.21% | Irish Continental Group 0.66% |
| 13 | Irish Life and Permanent 4.88% | Independent News & Media 0.3% | Independent News & Media 0.59% | Irish Continental Group 0.65% | Kenmare Resources 3.37% |
| 14 | Kerry Group 3.29% | Irish Life and Permanent 4.8% | Irish Life and Permanent 0.9% | Kenmare Resources 3.29% | Kerry Group 11.91% |
| 15 | Kingspan Group 2.40% | Kerry Group 8.1% | Kerry Group 11.18% | Kerry Group 10.75% | Kingspan Group 2.3% |
| 16 | McInerney Holdings 0.3% | Kingspan Group 2.3% | Kingspan Group 2.26% | Kingspan Group 2.17% | Paddy Power 4.73% |
| 17 | Paddy Power 1.3% | Paddy Power 2.9% | Paddy Power 3.77% | Paddy Power 4.73% | Ryanair 14.80% |
| 18 | Ryanair 9.33% | Ryanair 14.6% | Ryanair 17.44% | Ryanair 14.90% | Smurfit Kappa 2.71% |
| 19 | Smurfit Kappa 1.49% | Smurfit Kappa 2.2% | Smurfit Kappa 2.84% | Smurfit Kappa 1.85% | Total Produce 0.31% |
| 20 | United Drug 0.97% | United Drug 1.6% | United Drug 1.68% | United Drug 1.35% | United Drug 1.19% |

== See also ==
- List of companies listed on Euronext Dublin
