= Permanent TSB Plc v Langan and Anor =

Irish Supreme Court case

Permanent TSB Plc v. Langan and Anor
- Coat of arms of Ireland
- Court: Supreme Court of Ireland
- Full case name: Permanent TSB Plc and David Langan and The Attorney General
- Decided: 12 December 2017
- Citation: https://www.casemine.com/judgement/uk/5da02c2f4653d058440f9981

Case history
- Appealed from: Court of Appeal
- Appealed to: Supreme Court

Court membership
- Judges sitting: O' Donnell Donal J, McKechnie J, MacMenamin J, O'Malley Iseult

Case opinions
- Mr. Langan took out a mortgage with Permanent TSB and defaulted on the payments. He appealed to the High Court, but the High Court's ruling was against the rules of the Circuit Court. The case was referred to the Court of Appeal, and the High Court asked for clarifications. The Circuit Court lacked jurisdiction to hear the current matter as the subject property was a domestic dwelling that was rateable. The High Court proposed that the Circuit Court cannot proceed to judgment in relation to a domestic home that has been deemed unrateable by the Valuation Act 2001 when the defendant has contested the Circuit Court's jurisdiction. The Attorney General intervened in the Supreme Court appeal filed by Permanent TSB Plc, and the other Justices agreed with Clarke CJ's decision. The Circuit Court retained jurisdiction over the case if a property is not valued in accordance with the 2001 Act, and the plaintiff must demonstrate jurisdiction by providing a certificate of rateable valuation or solid proof that the property does not have a rateable valuation.
- Decision by: Clarke CJ

Keywords
- Practice Procedure, Post Hearing, Courts, Constitutional Law

Permanent TSB Plc v Langan and Anor, [2017] IESC 71; [2018] 1 I.R. 375, is a reported Irish Supreme Court case decision. The Court allowed the appeal from the Court of Appeal. It was found that the Circuit Court had the authority to conduct possession proceedings in this case.

== Background ==
Mr. Langan took out a mortgage with Permanent TSB. The term "defaulting" refers to Mr. Langan's failure to make mortgage payments. The recovery of possession of the six homes he had pledged as security for the mortgage was the subject of the Circuit Court hearing. Permanent TSB Plc is required to be the owner of the properties, according to the Circuit Court.

In an appeal to the High Court, Mr. Langan claimed that the Circuit Court lacked the authority to issue the types of orders that were upheld in the Bank of Ireland Mortgage Bank v. Finnegan case. In a ruling claiming jurisdiction, the High Court's conclusion was against the rules of the Circuit Court. Following the inconsistent High Court ruling, the case was referred to the Court of Appeal. The High Court asked for the following clarifications:

1. If a property is not rated because of the Valuation Act 2001 or for any other reason, is the Circuit Court's authority under s. 22(1) of the Courts (Supplemental Provisions) Act 1961 excluded? Or for any other reason?
2. Does the Circuit Court have jurisdiction because the property's rateable value is not greater than €253.95?
3. Is the Circuit Court permitted to reach a decision unless it can be proved the rateable valuation exceeds €253.95?
4. How does the court use their authority to assess rateable valuation under Section 31 of the County Officers and Courts (Ireland) Act 1877 (40 & 41 Vict. c. 56) if there is no certificate of rateable valuation?
5. In accordance with Section 31 of the County Officers and Courts (Ireland) Act 1877, is the plea in a civil bill admissible "legal evidence" when united with the testimony on affidavit of a preliminary estimate of rateable assessment?

According to Hogan J.'s ruling, the Circuit Court lacked jurisdiction to hear the current matter as the subject property was a domestic dwelling that was rateable.

The questions posed by Baker J (High Court) it was proposed they may be answered as follows:

1. Yes, subject to the response to question three.
2. No.
3. The Circuit Court cannot proceed to judgment in relation to a domestic home that has been deemed unrateable by the Valuation Act 2001 when the defendant has contested the Circuit Court's jurisdiction, unless the case falls within Part 10 of the 2009 Act or Section 3 of the 2013 Act.
4. Does not arise.
5. Does not arise.

== Holding of the Supreme Court ==
The Attorney General intervened in the Supreme Court appeal filed by Permanent TSB Plc on the basis that the issues raised were important to the general public. The other Justices agreed with Clarke CJ's decision, which would allow the appeal. The Court was persuaded to accept the following new responses instead of those offered by the Court of Appeal:

1. The Circuit Court retains jurisdiction over the case if a property is not valued in accordance with the 2001 Act.
2. The Circuit Court is fully qualified to consider the matter because the property's rateable value is not higher than €253.95.
3. In order to address points (3) through (5), it was urged that it be made clear that the plaintiff in a possession action of the kind that is the subject of this appeal must demonstrate jurisdiction. To demonstrate that jurisdiction, a certificate of rateable valuation demonstrating that the property is assessed at €253.95 less may be employed. Providing solid proof that the subject property does not genuinely have a rateable valuation is a different way to demonstrate that jurisdiction.

The Circuit Court was granted jurisdiction to hear possession disputes in cases where the relevant property's rateable value was established to be either €253.95 or less or to have no rateable value at all.

== Subsequent developments ==
In Condron v. Galway Holding Company Ltd, it was determined that the matter should have been filed in the Circuit Court because of the complexity of the claim. In accordance with the Circuit Court scale and with a certificate for senior counsel, the plaintiff's request for expenses was granted.
