= Heraty =

Heraty is a surname. Notable people with the surname include:

- Anne Heraty (born 1961), Irish businesswoman
- Toeti Heraty (1933–2021), Indonesian poet
