= Oldbawn =

Suburban area within Tallaght, Dublin, Ireland

Oldbawn An Seanbhábhún (Irish)
- Suburban area
- Location in Dublin
- Coordinates: 53°17′N 6°22′W
- Country: Ireland
- Province: Leinster
- County: County Dublin
- Local authority: South Dublin County Council

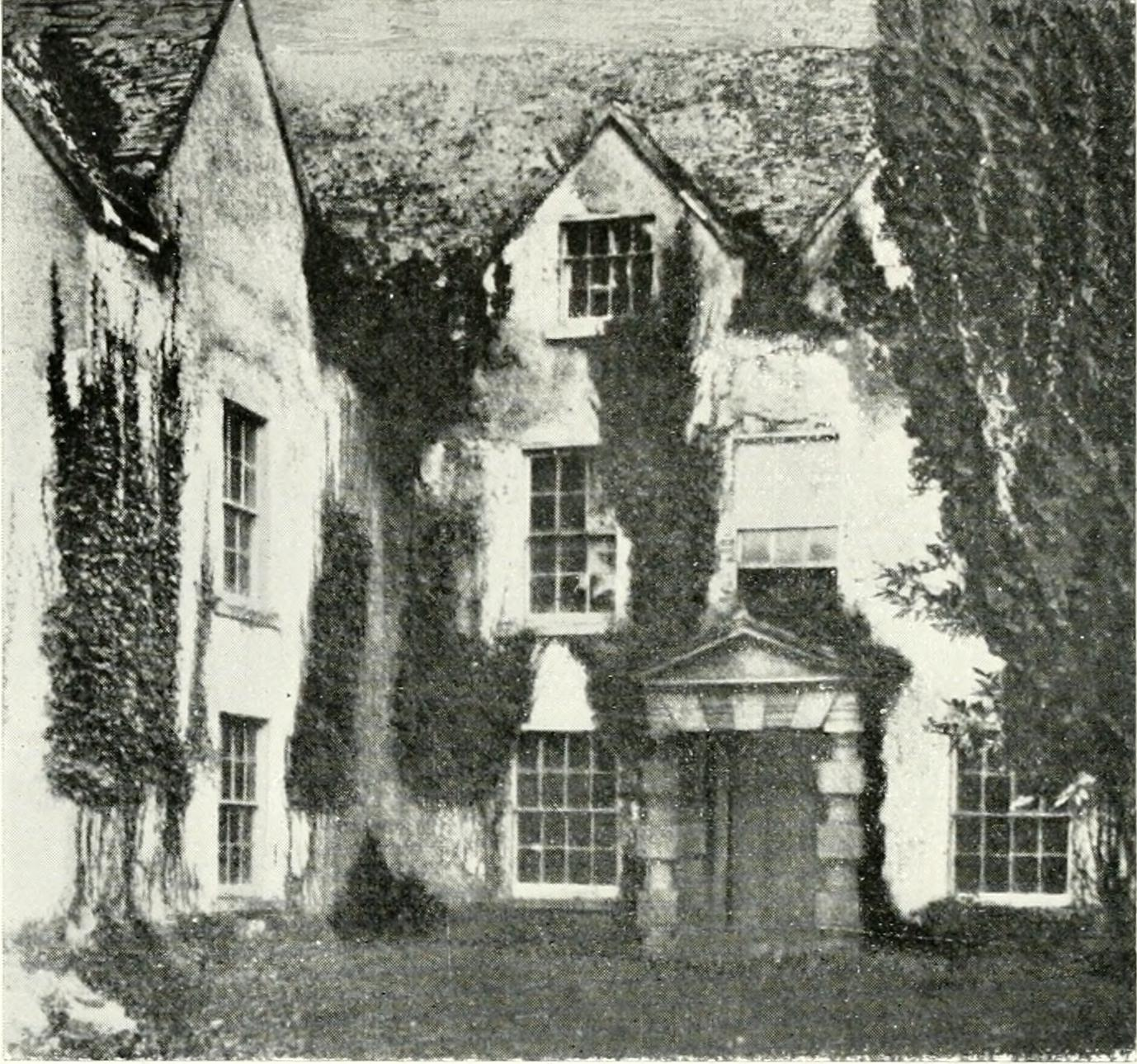
Old Bawn House, c1900

Oldbawn (or Old Bawn, Irish: An Seanbhábhún) is a small suburban area now within Tallaght on the southside of Dublin, Ireland. Formerly a small village in its own right, it is situated between Sean Walsh Park and the River Dodder.

A bawn is the defensive wall surrounding an Irish tower house. It is the anglicised version of the Irish word bábhún, meaning "cattle-stronghold" or "cattle-enclosure"

== History ==
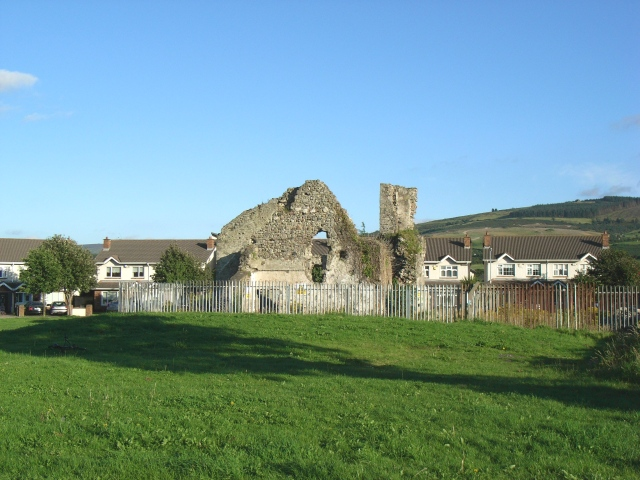
Ruins of house and tower in Oldbawn

Old Bawn was the site of an estate for several centuries, and later of a small village, whose population reached over 380 in the mid-19th century to the current number of nearly 14,000.

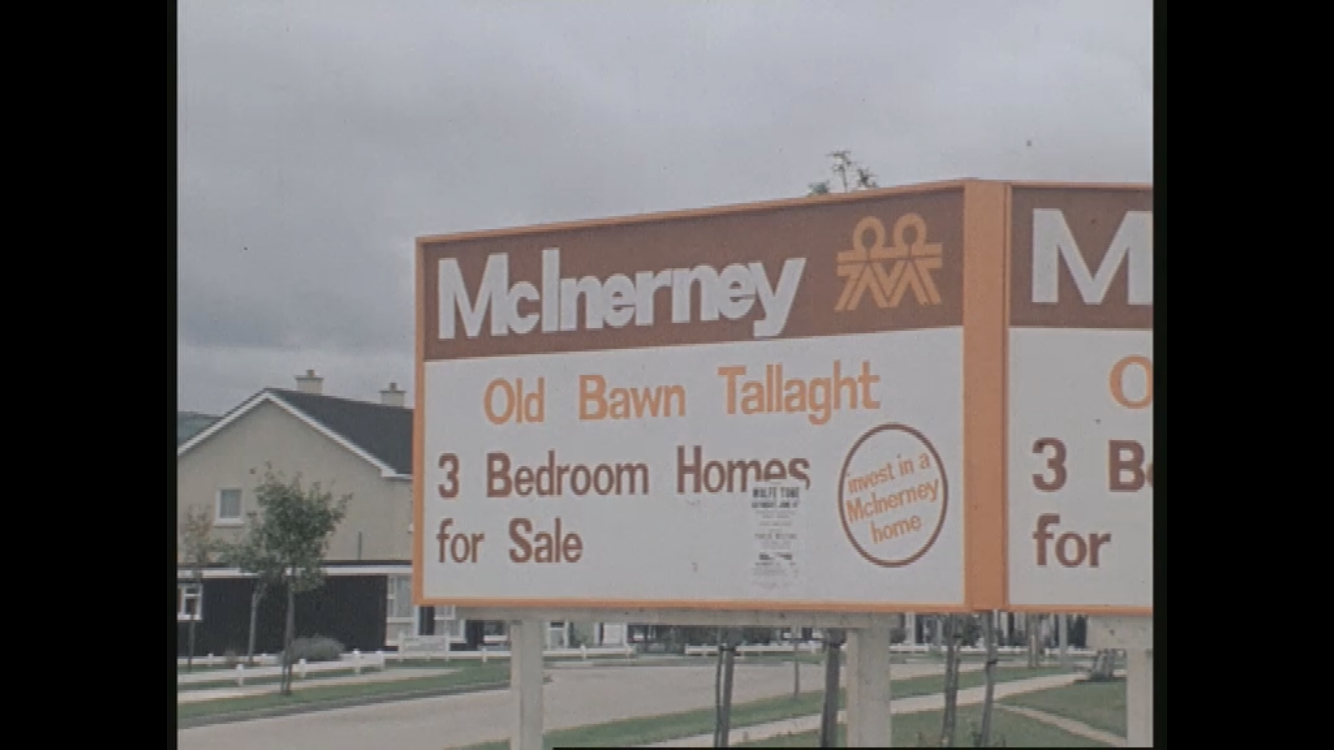
McInerney builders for sale sign in Oldbawn, October 1975

McInerney Homes began construction of the Old Bawn Housing Estate as it lies today, in the 1970s.

These 3 bed semi-detached homes first sold for on average £3,700 Irish Pounds or €4,700.

== Old Bawn House ==
Old Bawn House was built in 1635 by Archdeacon William Bulkeley, son of Launcelot Bulkeley the Archbishop. It was situated where the St. Maelruan's school now stands. It had extensive pleasure gardens that survived, albeit in a neglected state, until around 1900.

The house was damaged in Irish Rebellion of 1641, but restored shortly afterwards. The house was designed in an "H" shape with high-pointed gables and twelve chimneys. Its internal features included a chimneypiece and a carved oak staircase, both of which are now in the National Museum of Ireland. The chimneypiece reached to the ceiling and depicted the building of the walls of Jerusalem, dating back to 1635. There was also a lodge house built to the front of the house. The house was enclosed by a wide fosse with a drawbridge. To the south of the house, there was a large garden laid out with walks, ponds and trees.

The house passed to Lady Tynte who leased it. In 1830, Old Bawn was bought by the McDonnell family who established a paper mill behind the house. The house fell into disrepair during the early 1900s, and was used as a storehouse when the lands were being developed in the 1960s. Eventually, the remains of the house were demolished in 1976, and it is now the site of the Maelruans Primary School.

== Amenities ==
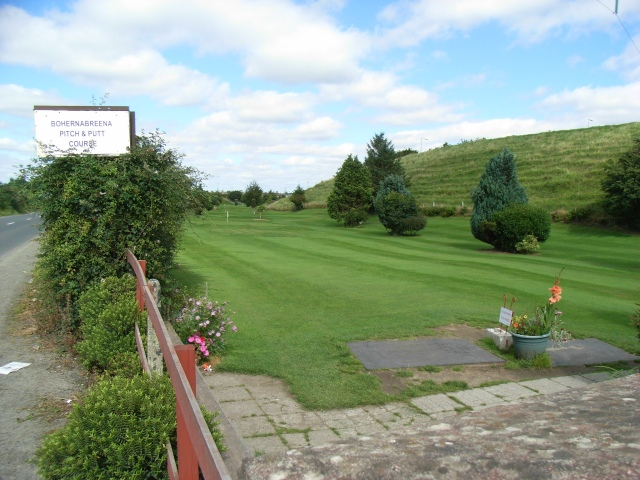
Bohernabreena Pitch and Putt Course

Amenities in the area include Tallaght Stadium, Aylesbury Shopping Centre, Oldbawn Shopping Centre, a number of parks, and Bohernabreena Pitch & Putt club.

== Community School ==
Old Bawn Community School is a secondary school located adjacent to Sean Walsh Park and the Tallaght Bypass in Oldbawn. Former students include footballers Keith Fahey and Stephen Kenny.

== Demographics ==
According to the Central Statistics Office census of 2011, the townland of Oldbawn had a population of 13,480 people. This included 6,591 males and 6,889 females. There were 4,979 houses in the area, with a vacancy rate of 3.1%.

The Old Bawn Estate contains 1,418 homes; 797 in the Old Bawn Estate on 20 roads, 332 on what is known as the Irish Estate across 11 roads, 157 in Parkwood and 132 in Watergate.
