= Averil Power =

Irish former politician (born 1978)

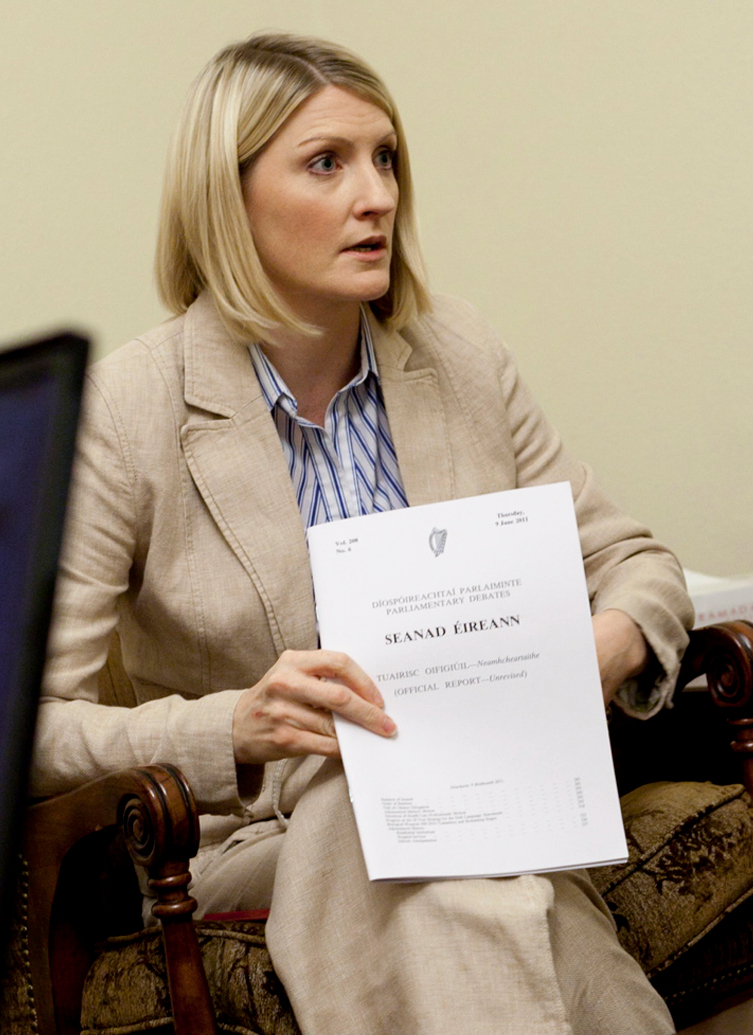
- Power in 2011

Senator
- In office 25 May 2011 – 8 June 2016
- Constituency: Industrial and Commercial Panel

Personal details
- Born: 26 July 1978 (age 48) Raheny, Dublin, Ireland
- Party: Independent (since 2015)
- Other political affiliations: Fianna Fáil (until 2015)
- Spouse: Fionnán Sheahan (sep.)
- Education: Trinity College Dublin; King's Inns
- Website: averilpower.ie

Averil Power (born 26 July 1978) is an Irish former politician who served as a senator for the Industrial and Commercial Panel from 2011 to 2016. She first held office as a member of Fianna Fáil, but left the party in 2015 and sat in the Seanad as an independent for the rest of her term. She stood as an independent candidate for Dáil Éireann at the 2016 general election, but was not elected.

== Early life ==
She grew up in a council estate and was the first person in her family to finish school and go to college.

She has a degree in business, economics and social science from Trinity College Dublin, where she was elected to the positions of President (2001–2002) and Education Officer (2000–2001) of Trinity College Dublin Students' Union. She also has a Diploma in Legal Studies from King's Inns and is a graduate of the Boston College Political Leadership Programme. She unsuccessfully contested election for President of the Union of Students in Ireland in March 2002, losing out to DIT student Colm Jordan.

== Political career ==
=== 2009–2011 ===
Power first sought election to public office at the 2009 local elections, contesting for Fianna Fáil in the Howth–Malahide local electoral area of Fingal County Council. She was unsuccessful, coming seventh with 7.5% of the vote. During this period she was employed as a political adviser by Minister Mary Hanafin in the Departments of Tourism, Social and Family Affairs and Education on a salary reported to be €100,191 per year plus pension contribution. She remained a political adviser to Hanafin until the 2011 general election.

=== 2011–2015 ===
In February 2011, before the general election, Fianna Fáil Leader Micheál Martin appointed Power directly to his Front Bench, in doing so breaking the convention that members of the Front Bench hold elected office. Power contested the Dublin North-East constituency at the 2011 general election but was not elected. In a three-seat constituency, she polled fourth on the first count, receiving 4,794 first preference votes (11.5%).

In March 2011, Micheál Martin nominated Power via the Oireachtas sub-panel to contest the 2011 Seanad election on the Industrial and Commercial Panel. She was elected, polling 75 votes.

=== 2015–present ===
On 25 May 2015, Power left Fianna Fáil, citing disagreements over how they had handled the same-sex marriage referendum. Power believed that Fianna Fáil did not sufficiently support the Yes campaign.

In December 2015, Power caused controversy when it emerged she had used taxpayers money to print 73,000 calendars that were to be distributed throughout her constituency just weeks before the 2016 general election.

She contested the 2016 general election in the newly created Dublin Bay North constituency as an independent candidate. She was again unsuccessful. She also contested the 2016 Seanad election for Dublin University.

In August 2016, the Asthma Society of Ireland announced that Power was taking up a €95,000 a year position as the charity's chief executive officer. In January 2018, she was appointed as the CEO of the Cancer Society of Ireland. In 2025 she will become CEO of the Clúid housing body.

== Interests ==
Power is interested in education, social justice, mental health and LGBT equality. She was awarded a GALA for 'Politician of the Year' by the National LGBT Federation in 2014. She also produced policy papers on youth mental health and increasing female representation in politics.

She has talked about being an adopted person and wants all Irish adoptees to have a right to their birth certs. She has an interest in development issues and volunteered in Mozambique with Voluntary Service Overseas in August 2011. She also visited the Occupied Palestinian territories with Christian Aid in 2013 and is a vocal advocate of the rights of the Palestinian people. She proposed a motion recognizing the State of Palestine which was passed by the Irish Senate in October 2014. She is a Jury member for the global Frontline Defenders human rights awards.

== Personal life ==
She was married to Fionnán Sheahan, who edits the Irish Independent.

On 23 October 2014, a man in California named Jeremy David Hanson sent Power a threatening email. The man later stated to FBI investigators that he regretted sending the email.
