= Anne Heraty =

Irish business woman (born 1961)

- Born: 1961 (age 64–65)
- Occupation: CEO of CPL Resources
- Known for: CPL, former non-executive director of Anglo

Anne Heraty is an Irish businesswoman. She is co-founder, major stake-holder and also CEO of CPL Resources.

== CPL ==
In 1989 Heraty and Keith O'Malley founded Computer Placement Ltd., a company placing people at IT companies that were setting up businesses in Ireland. In 1992 she took over all shares from other stakeholders (including O'Malley) and from then on she has owned 100% of the shares in CPL.

In 1996 Heraty's husband, Paul Carrol, joined the group and in 1999 they decided to bring CPL to the market; CPL Resources Plc. began trading on the Irish Stock Exchange and the London Stock Exchange. With this Heraty became the first female CEO of an Irish company floated on the stock exchange.

Heraty announced she would be standing down as CEO of CPL Resources on January 1, 2022.

== Entrepreneur of the Year ==
Due to her position as first female CEO of a listed Irish company, Heraty became known to the wider public. In 2006 she won the Ernst & Young Entrepreneur of the Year award and according to the website Business and Leadership she ranks number 26 on the list of most powerful women in Ireland.

Over the years this status has resulted in her being asked to become a member of several boards of directors of other companies. The most important involvements are:

- non-executive director of Anglo Irish Bank
- non-executive director of Irish Stock Exchange
- non-executive director of Forfas
- non-executive director of Bord na Mona

== Anglo Irish Bank ==
The most well-known position outside CPL is her role at Anglo Irish Bank. Relatively early in the downfall of the bank, shortly after the state took over ownership, Heraty stepped down from the board.

== Other board-memberships ==
Within a week of stepping down at Anglo she also quits her non-exec directorships at Forfas and Bord na Mona.

Herarty is a board member of Ibec, Ireland's largest business organisation and lobbying group.

In June 2025, Heraty attended a meeting of the Bilderberg Group, in Stockholm, a secretive meeting of some of the world's most powerful people, described by some as a meeting of the transnational power elite.
