= Clúid =

Housing agency based in Dublin, Ireland

- Predecessor: St. Pancras Housing Association
- Formation: January 1994
- Type: Non-governmental organisation
- Purpose: Approved Housing Body (AHB) which provides Social housing
- Headquarters: 159-161 Sheriff Street Upper, North Wall, Dublin, D01 R8N0
- Location: Dublin, Ireland
- Coordinates: 53.3499704°N 6.2331381°W
- Region served: Ireland
- Chief executive: Averil Power
- Chairperson: Mark Shakespeare
- Revenue: €93.95m (2022)
- Website: www.cluid.ie

Clúid (Irish: clúid – shelter) is an Irish non-governmental organisation and housing agency, based in Dublin which was originally established as the St. Pancras Housing Association in January 1994 with a mandate to provide public housing.

As of July 2023, Clúid was the largest housing agency in Ireland with more than 26,000 residents and more than 10,000 homes under management and with turnover of €93.95m in 2022. The organisation also had net assets of €1.8 billion and managed housing in each of the 26 counties of the Republic of Ireland.

Clúid is also involved in the provision of cost rental homes.

The organisation develops housing and apartments itself as well as upgrading, refurbishing and extending its existing stock of housing. The organisation has also acquired turnkey completed developments and has sought to "forward-fund" apartment and housing developments.

The organisation is a registered lobby group and lobbies ministers and government departments in relation to housing issues – including the Department of Housing, Local Government and Heritage.

== Selected developments ==
- 2021 - A purchase of 40 completed apartments in Raheny, Dublin by the Dublin Loft Company, a company related to Cosgrave Property Group.
- 2023 - The provision of 72 apartments in Dundalk, County Louth constructed by Sonas Developments and OHMG construction on a site owned by Clúid.
- 2024 - 112 homes in Blackpool, Cork

== Financial results ==
Year	2019	2020	2021	2022	2023
Currency	€	€	€	€	€
Revenue	46.9m	59.4m	75.9m	94.0m	118.0m
Net asset value	1.0bn	1.1bn	1.4bn	1.8bn	2.3bn
Homes under management	7,469	8,114	9,064	10,272	11,357

== See also ==
- Irish Residential Properties REIT - the largest landlord of privately rented apartments in Ireland.
- Respond! - a smaller Irish based housing agency
