= UDG Healthcare =

Irish healthcare company

UDG Healthcare plc
- Industry: Pharmaceutical
- Founded: 1948
- Headquarters: Dublin, Ireland
- Key people: Peter Gray, Chairman; Brendan McAtamney, CEO
- Revenue: ▼€1,279.2 million (2020)
- Operating income: ▲€130.9 million (2020)
- Net income: ▲€92.8 million (2020)
- Number of employees: 9,000 (2021)
- Parent: Clayton, Dubilier & Rice
- Website: www.udghealthcare.com

UDG Healthcare plc, formerly United Drug, is a Dublin-based international company and partner to the healthcare industry, providing clinical, commercial, communication and packaging services. It was listed on the London Stock Exchange until it was acquired by American private equity company Clayton, Dubilier & Rice in August 2021.

== History ==
The company was established in Ballina in County Mayo as The United Drug Chemical Company, a co-operative controlled by Irish pharmacists, in 1948. UDG bought Leicestershire-based Ashfield Healthcare for £16.5 million in 2000.

In January 2007, the company acquired Presearch, a UK laboratory services company, for GBP £2.9 million. It acquired Pharmexx, a Frankfurt-based business, in July 2012. In September 2012 it decided to move its primary listing from Irish Stock Exchange to the London Stock Exchange. It changed its name from United Drug to UDG Healthcare in October 2013. In February 2014, the company made its largest acquisition when it bought KnowledgePoint360 which specializes in healthcare communications for €105 million and made it part of its Ashfield division.

In September 2015, UDG Healthcare sold its Irish drug distribution businesses to McKesson Corporation for $466 million. In May 2016 UDG Healthcare acquired Pegasus, an integrated healthcare communications consultancy. In October 2016 the company acquired STEM Marketing, a provider of commercial, marketing and medical audits to pharmaceutical companies. In July 2017, the company acquired Vynamic; later in the same month it acquired Cambridge BioMarketing for up to $35 million. In August 2018, UDG Healthcare announced the sale of its Aquilant division to H2 Equity Partners, a European private equity firm, for a total potential net consideration of up to €23 million (approximately $27 million).

The company agreed to be acquired by Clayton, Dubilier & Rice in a £2.8 billion transaction in June 2021.

== Operations ==
UDG Healthcare plc operates across two divisions: Ashfield and Sharp.
