= Richard Conroy =

Irish politician and businessman (1933–2024)

Senator
- In office 1 November 1989 – 17 February 1993
- Constituency: Industrial and Commercial Panel
- In office 27 October 1977 – 8 October 1981
- Constituency: Cultural and Educational Panel

Personal details
- Born: 12 September 1933 Dublin, Ireland
- Died: 14 October 2024 (aged 91) Dublin, Ireland
- Party: Fianna Fáil
- Education: Royal College of Surgeons

Richard Conroy (12 September 1933 – 14 October 2024) was an Irish Fianna Fáil politician and businessman.

He was educated at Blackrock College and the Royal College of Surgeons in Ireland.

He was elected to Seanad Éireann on the Cultural and Educational Panel in 1977 and served until 1981. He was again elected to the Seanad in 1989 on the Industrial and Commercial Panel and served until 1993. He lost his seat at the 1993 Seanad election, and was an unsuccessful candidate at the 1997 Seanad election.

Conroy was a member of Dublin County Council for the Ballybrack electoral area from 1991 to 1994, and of Dún Laoghaire–Rathdown County Council from 1994 to 1999. He stood for election to Dáil Éireann for various Dublin constituencies, at five general elections between 1977 and 1987, but was unsuccessful on all occasions.

He was an emeritus professor of physiology in the Royal College of Surgeons in Ireland, and founder and director of Conroy Gold and Natural Resources, a mining and exploration company.

Conroy was a member of the executive committee of the Trilateral Commission.

Conroy died in Dublin on 14 October 2024, at age of 91.
