= Kenmare Resources =

Irish mining company

Kenmare Resources plc
- Company type: Public
- Traded as: LSE: KMR; Euronext Dublin: KMR; ISEQ 20 component
- ISIN: IE00BDC5DG00
- Industry: Mining
- Founded: 1972; 54 years ago
- Headquarters: Dublin, Ireland
- Key people: Andrew Webb, Chairman; Michael Carvill, Managing Director; Tom Hickey, Finance Director
- Revenue: ▼$328.6 million (2025)
- Operating income: ▼$(300.4) million (2025)
- Net income: ▼$(325.0) million (2025)
- Total assets: ▼$1,108.4 million (2025)
- Total equity: ▼$814.8 million (2025)
- Website: kenmareresources.com

Previous logo

Kenmare Resources plc is a publicly traded mining company headquartered in Dublin, Ireland. Its primary listing is on the London Stock Exchange and it has a secondary listing on Euronext Dublin (LSE and ISE ticker: KMR). Kenmare is one of the world's largest mineral sands producers and the Company owns and operates the Moma Titanium Minerals Mine. Moma is one of the world's largest titanium minerals deposits, located 160 km from the city of Nampula in Mozambique.

Kenmare is the world's fourth largest producer of titanium feedstocks (ilmenite and rutile), which are primarily used to make titanium dioxide (Ti0_{2}) pigment. Ti0_{2} pigment impart whiteness and opacity in the manufacture of paper, paint and plastics. The company is responsible for 8% of global supply of titanium feedstocks at current production levels.

== History ==
Kenmare was incorporated in Ireland in 1972 under the name Kenmare Oil Exploration Limited. After several years of oil exploration, the Company re-registered as a public limited company under the name Kenmare Oil Exploration Plc on 5 June 1985. On 28 July 1987, the Company changed its name to Kenmare Resources plc and in 1994 it was listed on the main market of the London Stock Exchange and the main market of the Irish Stock Exchange (now Euronext Dublin).

In 1987, the company acquired 50% of the licence for the Congolone heavy mineral sands deposit in Mozambique and during 1989, Kenmare's holding increased to 95%.

Separately, the Company operated the Ancuabe graphite mine from 1994 until 1999 when it was placed on care and maintenance due to a fall in graphite prices.

Kenmare's drilling of the Congolone deposit resulted in measured mineral resources of 167 million tonnes of ore at grade 3.3% heavy minerals, containing a recoverable 4 million tonnes of ilmenite and associated co-products rutile and zircon. In 1996, BHP became a joint venture partner with Kenmare in the development of the Congolone deposit. Over the coming years, BHP would begin appraising the Namalope, Pilivili and Mualadi deposits and identify new heavy minerals deposits, which would ultimately become the main focus of the mining project. Following the closure of some of BHP's titanium feedstocks operations, the joint venture agreement was dissolved in 1999 and by 2001 Kenmare had acquired the exclusive rights to the deposit.

Work began constructing the mine in October 2004. Production began in 2007 and Kenmare exported its first ilmenite from Moma in December 2007. Commercial production commenced in 2009.

A settling pond adjacent to the Moma Mine breached its southern wall on 8 October 2010. A non-toxic discharge of water, sand and clay flowed through the nearby village of Topuito, leaving one 4-year-old child missing. Mining at Moma is undertaken using dredges and floating concentrator plants. Once the minerals are extracted, sand and clay tailings are deposited behind the plants through a series of settling ponds. The accident occurred when a containment wall on one of these settling ponds failed during the early hours of the morning. Mining resumed the following month after some 300 homes had been rebuilt. Kenmare extensively reviewed the berm system, which surrounds the containment ponds and implemented design changes provided by independent engineering firms to prevent any future incidents.

== Operations ==
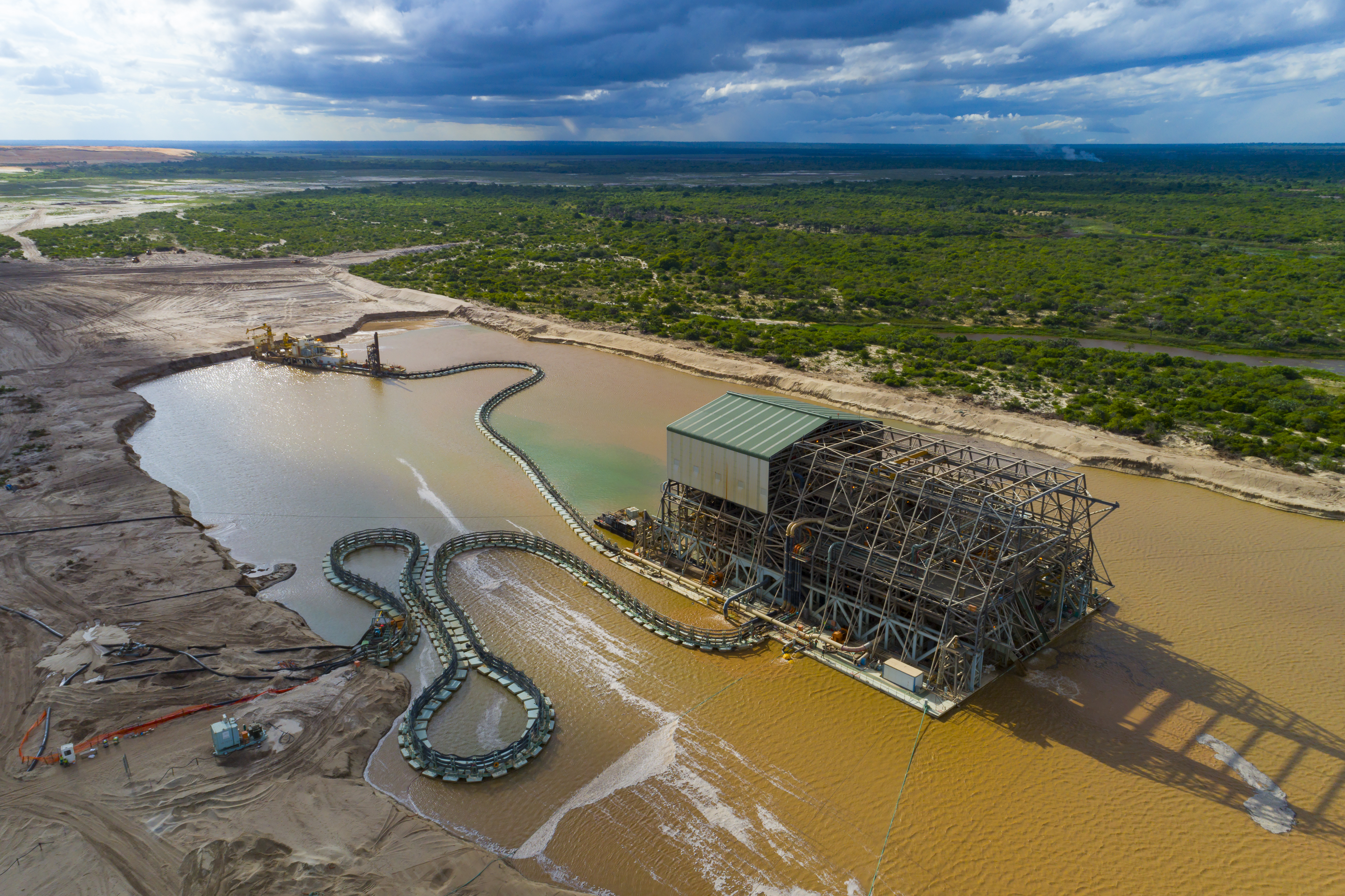
WCP B at Namalope

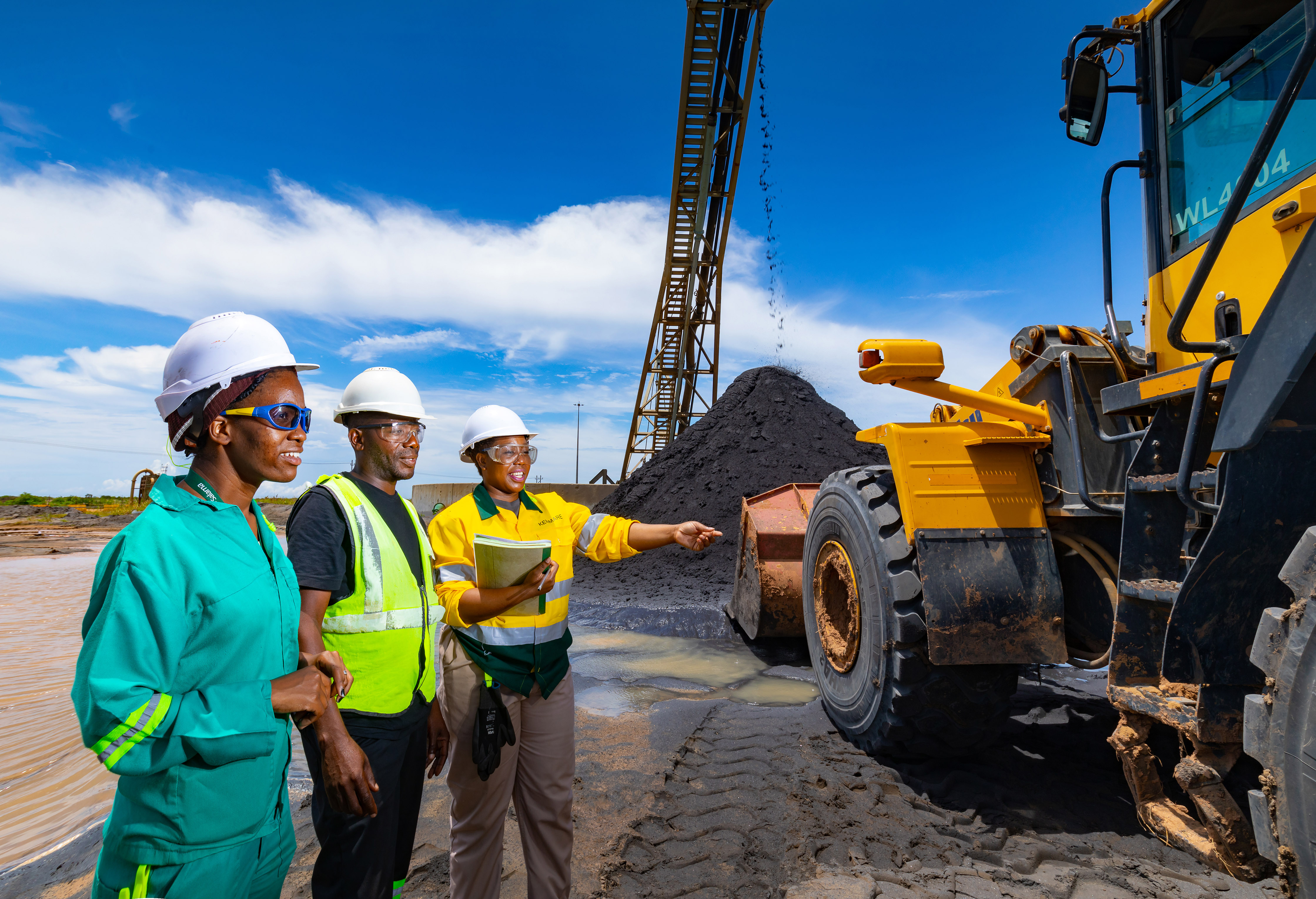
Kenmare employees at mineral separation plant stockpiles in Mozambique

The company's principal asset is the Moma Titanium Minerals Mine, located in Moma, Nampula Province, Mozambique. It has been in production since late 2007. In 2021 the Mine produced 1,228,500 tonnes of finished products, up 46% compared to 2020. This included 1,119,400 tonnes of ilmenite, up 48% compared to 2020. Kenmare is targeting ilmenite production (plus associated co-products) of approximately 1.2 million tonnes per annum on a sustainable basis.

The Mine produces 8% of the world's titanium feedstocks (ilmenite and rutile), which are predominantly used in the production of titanium dioxide pigment favoured for its whiteness and opacity in paper, paint and plastics.

The Moma Mine also produces zircon, an important raw material in the manufacture of ceramics, and mineral sands concentrates, which is used in various clean technology applications.

The Mine is estimated to have a mine life of over 100 years at current production levels, with approximately 6.3 billion tonnes of Mineral Resources in various ore zones. The current mine plan extends beyond 2040.

The Mine has a low environmental impact, with over 90% of its power requirement in 2021 sourced from a renewable source (hydropower). No toxic chemicals are used in Moma's mining or processing operations and Kenmare employs a progressive rehabilitation strategy in order to return mined land to local communities in a timely manner.

At the end of 2021, the Mine employed over 1,500 people and 97% were Mozambican. In 2021 the Mine received a five star NOSA accreditation for health, safety and environmental management for the sixth consecutive year.

The total Proved and Probable Ore Reserves under the Namalope, Pilivili, and Nataka mining concession are estimated as at 31 December 2021 at 1,534 million tonnes, grading 2.7% ilmenite, 0.18% zircon and 0.059% rutile, containing 41 million tonnes of ilmenite, 2.7 million tonnes of zircon and 0.90 million tonnes of rutile. The total Mineral Resource (excluding Ore Reserves) held by the Group under a combination of exploration licences and mining concessions is estimated as at 31 December 2021 at 6.3 billion tonnes, grading 2.4% ilmenite, 0.16% zircon and 0.052% rutile, containing 149 million tonnes of ilmenite, 10 million tonnes of zircon and 3.3 million tonnes of rutile.

== Kenmare Moma Development Association ==
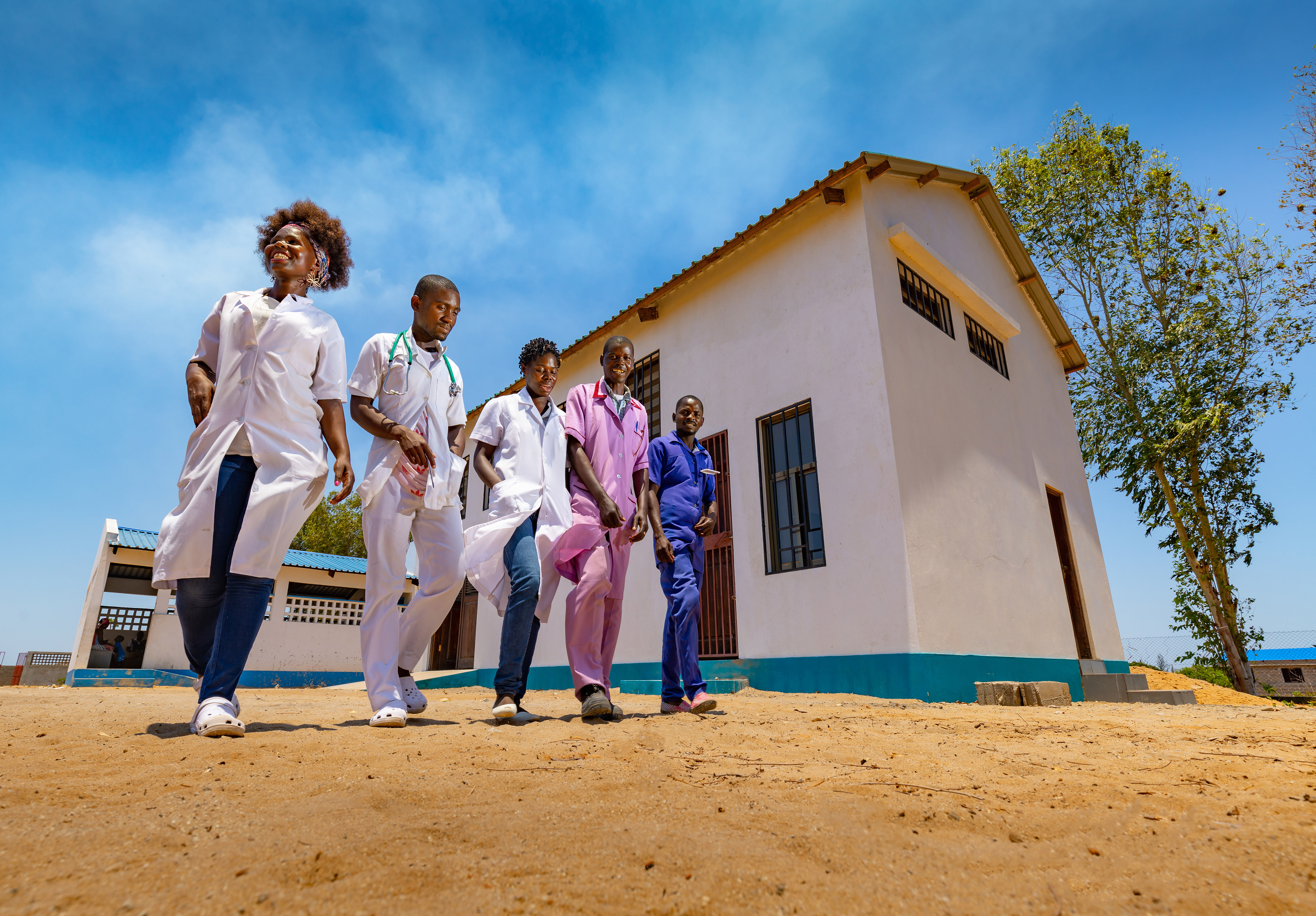
Community health centre constructed by KMAD

In 2004 Kenmare established a not-for-profit development association called the Kenmare Moma Development Association (KMAD). KMAD's objective is to implement development projects in the Moma Mine's host communities, with the three key focuses of economic development and livelihoods, healthcare development and education development. Since its inception, some of KMAD's initiatives have included drilling water boreholes to provide clean drinking water for more than 24,000 people, building over 70 classrooms for local school children, constructing two community health centres, and building a technical school for vocational development.

== Products ==
The Moma Mine's primary product is ilmenite (accounting for 79% of revenue in 2021), with the associated co-products of primary zircon (15% of revenue), concentrates including mineral sands concentrate (5% of revenue), and rutile (1% of revenue).

Kenmare is the world's fourth largest producer of titanium feedstocks (ilmenite and rutile), which are primarily used to make titanium dioxide (Ti0_{2}) pigment. TiO_{2} pigment impart whiteness and opacity in the manufacture of paper, paint, plastics and multiple other ‘quality of life’ items like inks, pharmaceuticals, and cosmetics. The company is responsible for 8% of global supply of titanium feedstocks at current production levels.

The Moma Mine also produces zircon, which is an important raw material for the ceramics industry, and mineral sands concentrate, which is used in various clean technology applications.

Ilmenite is a common accessory mineral in igneous rocks, sediments, and sedimentary rocks in many parts of the world. Apollo astronauts found abundant ilmenite in lunar rocks and the lunar regolith. Ilmenite is a black iron-titanium oxide with a chemical composition of FeTiO_{3}. Ilmenite is the primary ore of titanium, a metal needed to make a variety of high-performance alloys. Most of the ilmenite mined worldwide is used to manufacture titanium dioxide, TiO_{2}, an important pigment, whiting, and polishing abrasive.

Zircon is a zirconium silicate mineral with a chemical composition of ZrSiO_{4}. It is common throughout the world as a minor constituent of igneous, metamorphic, and sedimentary rocks. Zircon is present in most soils and clastic sediments. Zircon-rich sediments are mined and the recovered zircon is used to produce zirconium metal and zirconium dioxide. These are used in a wide variety of manufactured products and industrial processes.

Rutile is a titanium oxide mineral that is most commonly found in granites, pegmatites, and metamorphic rocks. It is also found in sands derived from the weathering of these rocks. Rutile also forms as slender crystals within quartz and micas. It is a common mineral in the alluvial sands that are dredged for magnetite and ilmenite. Rutile is used as a coating on welding rods. It is also used as an ore of titanium, a metal used where light weight and high strength are needed. Some rutile is used in the production of pigments for paints.

In Q4 2018 Kenmare introduced a new product stream called mineral sands concentrate, which contains monazite. Monazite is a rare phosphate mineral with a chemical composition of (Ce,La,Nd,Th)(PO_{4},SiO_{4}). It usually occurs in small isolated grains, as an accessory mineral in igneous and metamorphic rocks such as granite, pegmatite, schist, and gneiss. These grains are resistant to weathering and become concentrated in soils and sediments downslope from the host rock. When in high enough concentrations, they are mined for their rare earth and thorium content. Monazite is an important source of thorium, cerium, and other rare elements. Often mined as a byproduct from heavy mineral deposits. Kenmare despatched its first shipment of mineral sands concentrate from the Moma Mine in Q2 2019.

== Markets ==
Kenmare's products are raw materials used in the production of many consumer products. Demand for Kenmare's products is heavily linked to the performance of the global economy. Ti0_{2} pigment is a ‘quality of life’ item and consumption of it grows as income levels increase. Kenmare also expects to benefit from emerging supply constraints. The Company believes that current product prices are not high enough to incentivise new greenfield projects to be built, which means that over time, demand for titanium feedstocks will exceed the available supply. This is expected to support product prices.

Kenmare's sales profile is geographically diverse with the Company selling its products to customers operating in more than 15 countries globally. In 2021, 49% of the company's revenue was attributable to Chinese markets, 18% to European markets, 10% to US markets and 23% to the rest of the world.

== Expansion plans ==
In August 2018, Kenmare announced three development projects that together had the objective of increasing Moma's production:

- The first of the three development projects, the WCP B upgrade, has the objective of increasing WCP B's capacity which by the end of 2023 had reached 2,400 tph.
- The second project was the construction of a third mining plant, named WCP C, and this work was primarily undertaken during 2019. The project budget was US$45 million. WCP C produced its first heavy mineral concentrate, which is then separated into Kenmare's four final products, in February 2020. The project experienced some delays due to the late delivery of the concentrator by the contractor, but Kenmare WCP C achieved its nameplate capacity in Q2 2020 and was completed under budget.
- The third project was the relocation of WCP B to the high grade Pilivili ore zone. The move took place in Q3 2020, once WCP B had completed its mine path in Namalope. It was completed largely on time, despite the challenges posed by the COVID-19 pandemic, and for a capital cost of US$127 million.

The Mine briefly suspended operations in June 2015 in the face of industrial action by employees unhappy about the company's cost-cutting measures. Successful negotiation between the union, the Company and the Ministry of Labour had resulted in agreement on somewhat less drastic measures involving fewer layoffs than originally announced. The industrial action was not organized by the union. Operations resumed in early July 2015.

By late 2015, the Mine had fallen into financial crisis due to a worldwide drop in mineral prices. Flooding in northern Mozambique was also causing power outages in the Moma region. Prices for titanium ingots fell by about a third between 2012 and 2015. This led Kenmare to undertake a capital raising and restructuring in mid-2016, raising US$275 million and reducing its debt by 74%. As a result, the company's balance sheet was significantly stronger, with a robust cash position and a manageable debt position.

== Iluka attempted takeover ==
In June 2014, following media speculation in Australia, both Iluka Resources and Kenmare Resources announced that Iluka had made an approach to Kenmare, based on a paper transaction, regarding a possible takeover. No formal offer was made, although a number of prices were put forward. The process carried on over an extended period, during which Iluka returned with a lower offer. The Iluka approaches failed to attract support from Kenmare's largest shareholder and Iluka ultimately ended the process in December 2015.

== Oman investment and restructuring ==
As Iluka was announcing its decision to withdraw from takeover talks, Kenmare management announced that the State General Reserve Fund (SGRF) of Oman, which is now known as the Oman Investment Authority (OIA), had indicated an interest in investing US$100 million, based on an overall restructuring arrangement being accepted by shareholders. The deal which would ultimately be agreed, saw SGRF invest US$100 million of an overall US$275 million refinancing of the company, which closed in mid-2016. Lenders to the Company agreed to substantially reduce debt.
