= Respond! =

Respond Housing Association and Service Provider
- Formation: 1982
- Legal status: Not for Profit
- Purpose: Housing Association and service provider
- Location(s): Dublin and Waterford offices with regional offices around the country.
- Region served: Ireland
- Members: Irish Council for Social Housing, Housing Alliance, Children's Right Alliance, Feantsa.
- CEO: Declan Dunne
- Website: http://www.respond.ie

Respond is a construction-led Approved Housing Body and service provider, with a staff of over 350. 17,008 tenants live in 7,761 properties across the 26 counties that Respond either own or manage. Respond also provide a range of services for families and individuals within their communities. This includes emergency accommodation with 24/7 support for families who are homeless in six Family Homeless Services, three Day Care Services for Older People, 15 Early Childhood Care and Education, Family Support and Refugee Resettlement services. A founder of Respond in 1981, Fr. Patrick Cogan OFM, was CEO for over thirty years retiring in 2015 and dying in October 2022. The CEO is now Declan Dunne.

== Direct Construction ==
Respond deliver social and cost rental homes. In 2022, they delivered the first purpose build cost rental homes in Ireland, alongside their partners. Respond are one of the few Approved Housing Bodies in the country to directly manage construction. Respond have their own in house Development team, led by Parag Joglekar. The team is a multi-disciplinary team of registered architects, quantity surveyors, planners, clerks of works, technicians and project managers who deal with all aspects of construction and project delivery.

== Managing Housing ==
Respond is responsible for various housing developments with 7,761 homes in the 26 counties of Ireland. These are managed by a Housing department led by Neil Bolton and made up of a tenant relations team who work with tenants to build and support communities where people want to live and as asset management team that maintain, repair and upgrade Respond homes. Respond report that 90% of their tenants are satisfied with their overall service.

== Building Communities ==
Respond recognised from an early stage that people need homes but they also need communities and services around these home. Over half of the staff comes from a social care background. The organisation provides community services including 15 Early Years and School Age Care services, six Family Homeless services, three Day Care for Older People services, Family Support services and has delivered Refugee Resettlement services for local authorities. The Services team is led by Louisa Carr.

== Working at Respond ==
Respond is a listening and learning organization and is progressing several programmes of continuous improvement, including becoming a trauma informed organization. Respond partners with the Global Brain Health Institute (GBHI) based in Trinity College Dublin. The partnership aims to examine our understanding of brain health and how it can be applied to housing design and to the provision and the development of sustainable communities. The organization reports a very high level of staff engagement, with a Net Promoter Score of 45.

== Improving Quality (IQ) Accreditation Standard ==
In 2022, Respond achieved the Improving Quality (IQ) Accreditation Standard. IQ is recognised as a key quality framework for the voluntary sector in the Republic of Ireland and the UK and provides independent assurance of the essential areas necessary for the effective management and governance of a charity or other third sector organisation. Run by Community Matters in the UK, IQ addresses all the key areas of organisational life in four elements; accountability, effectiveness, sustainability and welcome (including the involvement of service users, development of staff, equality and diversity).

== Executive Management Team ==
Respond's Executive Management Team is made up of Declan Dunne (CEO), Nessa Aylmer (Executive Head of Compliance), Neil Bolton (Director of Housing), Louisa Carr (Director of Services), Ray Fanning (Director of Finance), Parag Joglekar (Head of Investment and Development), Olivia McCann (Director of Legal Services and Compliance), Jacqui Sinnot (Director of People and Culture), Mark Johnson (Executive Head of Development) and Niamh Randall (Director of Strategy and Publin Affair).

== Board of directors ==
Noel Kelly is the Chair of Respond's Board. Other Board members include Aileen McHugh, Cathleen Callanan, Aidan Skelly, John O’Connor, Joseph O’Connor, Sinead O’Neill, Michael Dominick Anglim, Marian Keane, Daniel Vincent McCarthy, Cathal O’Connell and Olivia McCann is Director of Legal Services, Compliance & Company Secretary.

== See also ==
- Clúid
