= William Bulkeley (priest) =

Irish Anglican priest

William Bulkeley was an Anglican priest in the 17th century.

The son of Lancelot Bulkeley Archbishop of Dublin from 1619 to 1650, he was born in Dublin and educated at Trinity College, Dublin. He was Prebendary of Mulhuddart in St Patrick's Cathedral, Dublin from 1626 to 1627 and then Chancellor from 1627 to 1636; and Archdeacon of Dublin from 1636 until his death in 1671.

Bulkley built Old Bawn House in 1635 in Tallaght in South County Dublin.
