= Donegal Investment Group =

Irish produce company

Donegal Investment Group (Euronext Dublin: DQ7A ) is an Irish produce company. It has operations in Ireland, Britain, the Netherlands and Brazil. Its chief executive is in Ireland.

Donegal Investment Group specialises in the production and sale of seed potatoes and organic produce for the Irish and British markets and is listed on the Irish Stock Exchange. It is also known for its line of Daisi products, Daisi being the name of the cow that features on the milk the company sells.

Donegal Investment Group sold its Donegal Creameries dairy processing operations and retail division to Aurivo Co-operative Society Limited, then known as Connacht Gold, in 2011.

== See also ==
- List of companies listed on the Irish Stock Exchange
