= Re McInerney Homes Ltd =

Irish Supreme Court case

McInerney Homes Limited & Ors. & Companies (Amendment) Act 1990
- Coat of arms of Ireland
- Court: Supreme Court of Ireland
- Full case name: In the Matter of McInerney Homes Limited and in the Matter of McInerney Holdings Public Limited Company, McInerney Construction (Holdings) Limited, McInerney Contracting Limited, McInerney Contracting Dublin Limited (Each a Related Company), and in the Matter of the Companies (Amended) Act 1990 (as Amended) McInerney Homes Limited, McInerney Holdings Public Limited Company and McInerney Contracting Limited (known as McInerney Homes)
- Decided: 22 July 2011
- Citation: [2011] IESC 31

Case history
- Appealed from: High Court of Ireland
- Appealed to: Supreme Court of Ireland

Court membership
- Judges sitting: Fennelly J. Macken J. Finnegan J. O'Donnell J. McKechnie J.

Case opinions
- Decision by: Justice Donal O'Donnell and Justice Niall Fennelly
- Concurrence: Justice Finnegan, Justice McKechnie, Justice Macken
- Concur/dissent: Justice Fennelly, Justice Macken

Keywords
- Examinership, Companies Act

McInerney Homes Ltd v Cos Acts 1990 [2011] IESC 31 is one of the few Irish Supreme Court cases on the topic of examinership under the Companies (Amendment) Act 1990. The Court held that the onus of proof under the legislation lay with the Examiner to show that a proposed scheme of debt restructuring was not unfair to any interested party.

== Background ==
The applicant’s company were part of the McInerney construction group but due to the economic down-turn in 2010 the group has suffered financially. This led to an application for the appointment of an examiner and the associated protection from creditors. Under this procedure a scheme was arranged and put before the High Court for approval. The banks in question, namely Bank of Ireland, Anglo-Irish Bank and KBC, contested the application with the High Court finding that the scheme was “unfairly prejudicial to their interests”.

An injunction was granted in July 2011 in order to prevent McInerney Homes from taking certain steps that would weaken the Banks security. It is alleged that McInerney Homes have not complied with the injunction order and therefore the Banks bring further proceedings to the court for contempt of court.

The Supreme Court examined the question as to whether Bank of Ireland, Anglo-Irish Bank and KBC acting as creditors were unfairly prejudiced by the examiner’s proposal under the Companies (Amendment) Act 1990.

=== Grounds of appeal ===
The case was appealed to the Supreme Court and on this appeal it appears that the issue which the Court had to decide were the following (chronologically):

"i) What is the test for the determination of the existence of unfair prejudice pursuant to Section 24 of the Companies Act 1990?

ii) On whom does the onus lies of establishing unfair prejudice or its absence?

iii) Was the Court correct in the first confirmation Judgement to conclude that the banks did suffer unfair prejudice on the information before the Courts?

iv) If so, was the Court correct to reopen the issue of unfair prejudice?

v) Was the Court correct to refuse to reopen the decision in light of the improve Oaktree offer?"

== Holding of the Supreme Court ==
The Supreme Court gave its majority ruling through Justice Donal O’Donnell.

Addressing the first question the Supreme Court majority panel first commented on the examinership process, holding that “the process is not intended to operate to secure the survival of a company at all costs”. The process of examinership should be approved when it is beneficial to all parties as per Section 24. As such the Supreme Court was of the view that the trial Judge’s approach was consistent and that a creditor may be required to accept less than it would obtain in circumstances of liquidation or receivership. The Supreme Court highlighted that where the above applies to a creditor it would normally require weighty justification.

Addressing the second question the Supreme Court majority panel held that “once an objection is made under Section 25 the onus of establishing the matter is on the objector”. Therefore Sections 24 and 25 of the Companies Act 1990 were to be read together, thus placing the onus on the objector to establish unfair prejudice. As such, the Court is prohibited from approving a scheme unless it is satisfied that this is not unfairly prejudicial to any creditor and the party seeking this takes the burden of proof.

Addressing the third question the Supreme Court majority panel was of the view that under Section 24, hearing are required to be conduced on the evidence available on the basis that should cross-examination of witnesses become a routine it would amount to considerable delays in hearing and finalising cases. The Supreme Court was of the view that the trial Judge was correct in concluding that it could not approve the proposals.

Addressing the forth question the Supreme Court majority panel concluded that the trial Judge correctly recognized the importance of unfair prejudice when deciding to reopen the issue of unfair prejudice. The criteria being set out under the case of Paulin v Paulin and Anor [2010].

Addressing the fifth and final question the Supreme Court majority panel was of the view that the trial Judge was correct in refusing to re-open the decision in light of the improved offer from Oaktree. The Supreme Court noted that when Oaktree made its final offer it had indicated that this was its final offer and therefore it cannot complain as this words was taken by all other parties involved including the Court. The Supreme Court highlights that in the course of examinership a party cannot indicate willingness to adjust certain aspects of the proposal if a Court should consider same necessary, as the hearing would normally be adjourned to allow for parties to consider the proposal this did not occur in the present case precisely because of everyone’s belief that Oaktree insisted that it had made its final offer.

In light of the above the Supreme Court majority panel dismissed the companies’ appeal on all of the five questions before the Court. The Court further held that this litigation, amongst others, is “one sad illustration of the loss and damage that has been caused by the traumatic expansion, and traumatic contraction, of the property marked in Ireland in the early years of this century”.

=== Dissent of Justice Fennelly ===
In dissent Justice Fennelly expressed the view that the right to object on the grounds of unfair prejudice was probably included in Section 25 of the Companies Act 1990 and that this does not affect the burden of proof. He argued that it was a burden on the balance of probabilities, as seen in the remarks of Judge McCarthy in Re Atlantic Magnetics [1993] and further through the observations made by Judge Clarke in Re Traffic Group Limited [2008]. As such, Justice Fennelly was of the view that the trial Judge did not correctly apply the principles of the burden of proof in the first judgement of the 10th of January 2011.

Justice Fennelly concluded that the trial Judge had applied the correct principles in reopening the case and that he had been correct to find that the banks and, in particular, KBC, would be unfairly prejudiced and would therefore allow the appeal.

== Subsequent developments ==
Following some of the difficulties in interpreting the Companies Act 1990 in modern times, up to date legislation was required, this came through the Companies Act 2014.
