= Irish Residential Properties REIT =

Irish listed residential property investment trust

- Company type: Public limited company
- Traded as: Euronext Dublin: IRES; LSE: 0QT8; FWB: IRES; ISEQ 20 component
- ISIN: IE00BJ34P519
- Industry: Real Estate
- Founded: April 2014
- Headquarters: Dublin, Ireland
- Key people: Eddie Byrne, CEO; Brian Fagan, CFO
- Revenue: €50.6 million (2018)
- Website: iresreit.ie

Irish Residential Properties REIT Plc or IRES is a multi-unit residential letting company and real estate investment trust (REIT) focused on the Dublin property market and those of other Irish urban centres. It is listed on Euronext Dublin and is a constituent member of the ISEQ 20 with a market capitalisation of €873m as of 31 January 2020. It has a secondary listing on the London Stock Exchange.

IRES was floated on the Irish stock exchange in April 2014 and was funded largely by the Canadian listed company Canadian Apartment Properties REIT (CAPREIT). IRES internalised its organisational structure and management team in January 2022.

The company is Ireland's largest private landlord with over 3,884 units under its ownership as of January 2020.

After Hibernia REIT was taken over by Brookfield Asset Management in June 2022, IRES was the final Irish REIT to remain a publicly listed company.

== Controversies ==
=== 2017 ===
In July 2017, a number of politicians and political activists including Mick Wallace, Eoin Ó Broin and Clare Daly protested outside the head offices of IRES in Grand Canal Dock, Dublin about increasing rents and the opening of a new development at the Maples in Sandyford.

=== 2025 ===
In March 2025, the company planned to add a €200 monthly charge as a so-called "common area" fee for new renters at one of its properties. The landlord refused to say if the €2,400 per year charge would be introduced at its other properties, when asked. Tenants questioned whether the charge was an attempt to circumvent rent pressure zone (RPZ) rules. City councillor Janet Horner said the new charge was "incredible" and wondered if the landlord was effectively raising the rent of the homes. She added, "One of the major concerns in the rental market is how little negotiating power tenants have. They are so desperate they will accept these arrangements, but I would wonder are they taking advantage of tenants here."

== See also ==
- Clúid
