= Zamano =

Irish internet and mobile technology company

Zamano plc
- Type: Public
- Industry: Mobile technology, Online communications
- Founded: 2000; 26 years ago
- Defunct: 2018
- Headquarters: Dublin, Ireland
- Key people: Ross Conlon, CEO (as of 2014) John Rocket, chairman (as of 2012)
- Website: zamano.com

Zamano plc was an Irish mobile technology company based in Dublin. The company decided in February 2017 to bring their premium rate SMS business lines to a close by the end of 2017. In November 2018, Zamano plc issued a press release stating that it was entering voluntary liquidation. A liquidator was appointed in early 2019.

== History ==
Zamano was founded in 2000. During 2002, Zamano reportedly partnered with RTÉ Interactive to launch several mobile and SMS-based games. Later in 2002, Zamano acquired Avoca's interactive SMS business. This provided the company with 10 premium rate SMS short codes covering four UK mobile networks.

In 2007, Zamano acquired Red Circle Technologies and Eirborne. In the same year, it was listed on the Irish Stock Exchange.

In 2011, Zamano announced an investment in a new entity called Newsworthie. However, investment in Newsworthie was ended in October 2011 with outgoing CEO John O'Shea announcing that "As our investment capacity is limited, we intend focusing it entirely on opportunities related to our mobile expertise, and have suspended further investment in Newsworthie." O'Shea departed the company as CEO in November 2011 and was replaced by interim-CEO Pat Landy in a temporary role.

In November 2013, Zamano launched Message Hero, an online business SMS service available to customers in Ireland and the UK

In April 2015, Zamano, signed a deal with Three mobile to allow the company's technology to be used as a conduit by e-commerce providers.

In 2017, Zamano announced plans to close parts of its business, and by September 2017 it was suggested that the company, following a management buyout, was considering investing in oil and gas exploration companies. By late 2018, the company announced its liquidation, and a liquidator was appointed in 2019.

== Controversy ==
On 4 February 2010, the UK phone service regulator PhonepayPlus fined and formally reprimanded Zamano £15,000 for breaching its terms and conditions in relation to unsolicited reverse-charge premium rate SMS messages. PhonepayPlus also ordered Zamano to issue refunds. On 29 March 2012, Zamano was fined a further £35,000 by PhonepayPlus for breaching its terms and conditions in relation to unsolicited reverse-charge premium rate SMS messages. The text messages were related to ringtone downloading services with recurring charges.

Between May 2012 and September 2013 Zamano received 587 complaints from consumers in relation to a competition service, "Play2Win". Consumers stated that they had received unsolicited, reverse-billed text messages and that they had not engaged with the service, or acknowledged engaging with the service but stated that they believed it was free. A Phonepayplus tribunal found that Zamano breached the Fairness and Misleading aspects of its code. Given repeated breaches of the code by Zamano, the tribunal imposed an increased fine of £40,000
