= McInerney Holdings =

Defunct Irish construction company

McInerney Holdings plc
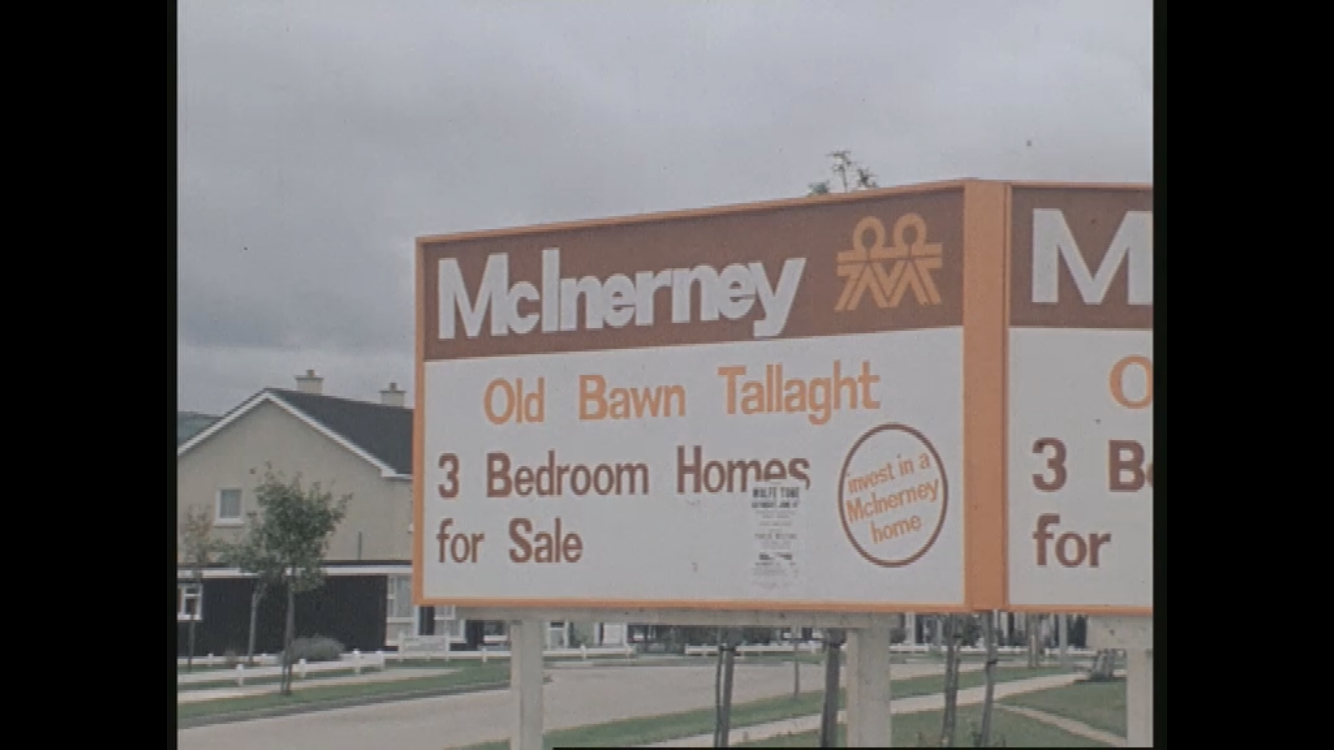
- A McInerney sign for a development site in Old Bawn, Tallaght in South County Dublin in 1975.
- Type: Public limited company
- Industry: Construction and house building
- Founded: 1909
- Founder: Thomas McInerney
- Headquarters: Dublin, Ireland
- Key people: Barry O'Connor (Managing Director); Ned Sullivan (Chairman); Dan McInerney (Managing Director)

McInerney Holdings plc (trading variously as McInerney Properties and McInerney Homes) was an Irish construction and development company with a focus on housebuilding, which existed from 1909 until 2011. The company initially focused on the Irish market but later expanded to the UK, Middle East and mainland Europe. In 2009 the company was said to have built nearly 90,000 houses in Ireland including nearly 10% of the housing in Ireland's main cities.

Following the bursting of the Irish property bubble, an examiner from PwC was appointed to the Irish housebuilding arm of the company in 2010 and it subsequently delisted from the stock exchange. The scheme to resurrect the company failed and a receiver and liquidator was later appointed over most of the group companies in 2010 and 2011.

== History ==
McInerney Homes was started by Thomas McInerney when he built his first house for a neighbour in Tulla, County Clare in 1909.

Thomas McInerney and Co Ltd was incorporated for the first time in the late 1940s and later traded under the name McInerney Properties. The company expanded throughout Clare and Galway building homes and schools. These often included social housing developments throughout the west of Ireland and the midlands. By the early 1950s, McInerney had entered the Dublin market and was building high volume suburban homes on green field sites including 190 houses for Dublin Corporation in Ballyfermot and 340 houses in Milltown. By the mid-1950s, it had expanded into the Greater London market and was soon constructing local authority housing across the South of England.

It floated on the Dublin and London Stock Exchanges (LSE: MCI) in December 1971 and was at that time the largest Irish company to float on the stock exchange.

Dan McInerney, one of the senior management figures at the time, was quoted from 1975 as having said, beside being a great social need, housing in Ireland was a leading industry and was like the motor industry in America.

The group had an operating profit of €58m in 2007 completing 2,414 units across Ireland, the UK and Spain and was a constituent of the ISEQ 20. The group then swung to an operating loss before tax of €47m in 2008 only completing 1,359 units.

The company celebrated its centenary in 2009 and it estimated that at that stage it had built over 90,000 homes in Ireland.

In 2010, the company delisted from the stock exchange having entered examinership. It was then involved in a notable court case McInerney Homes Ltd v Cos Acts 1990 following its examinership in 2010, however the British arm of the company was sold off to a competitor while the Irish operation was ultimately wound-up.

== Notable developments ==
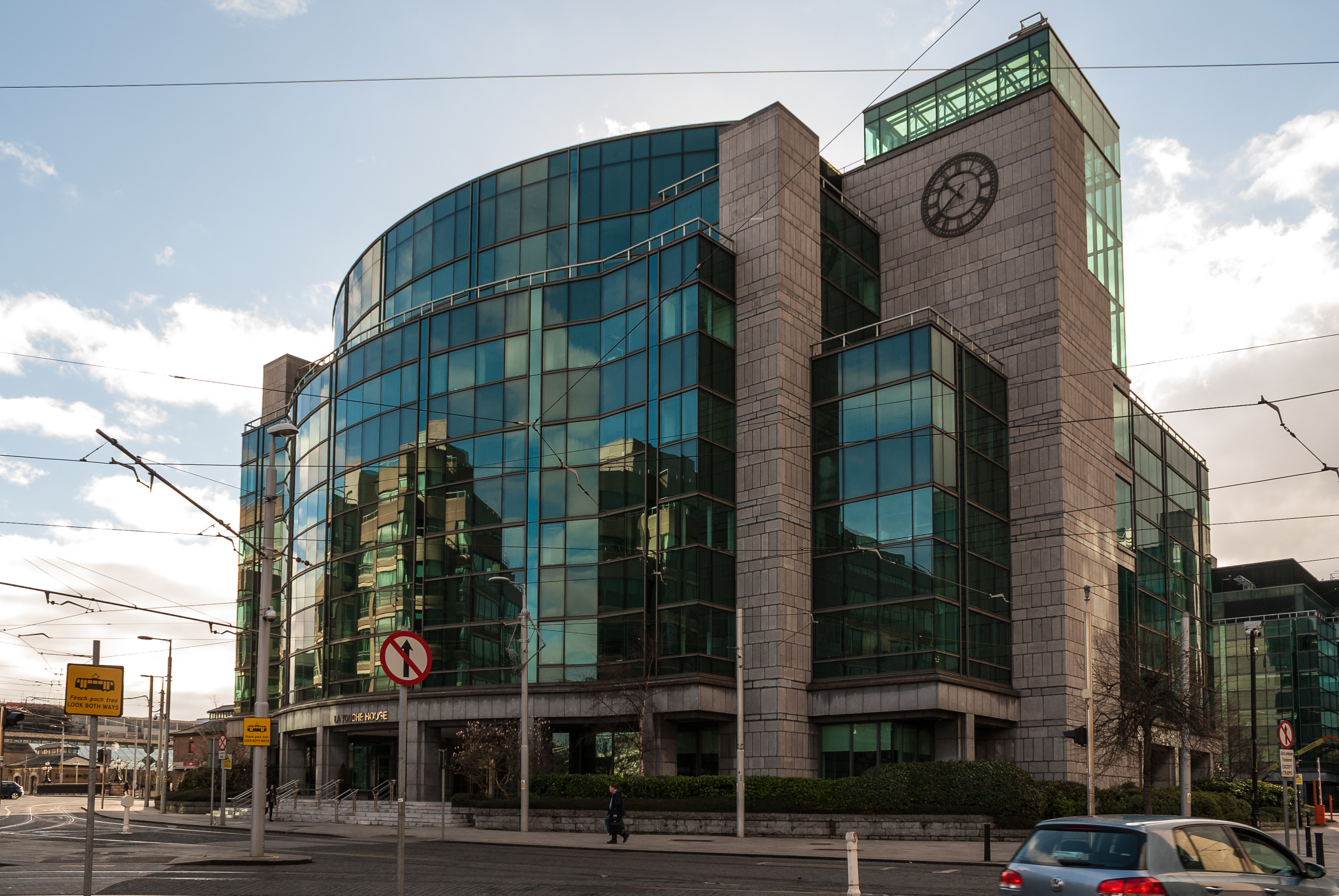
LaTouche House, Dublin

Some of its most notable developments include:

- A runway at Shannon airport in 1949
- Science buildings at University College Dublin complex at Belfield in the early 1950s
- The Hogan Stand at Croke Park
- Houses on the grounds of various golf courses including Druids Glen, Mount Juliet and Adare Manor
- The future European headquarters of Stripe on Grand Canal Street, Dublin 2
- The first phase of the IFSC on behalf of British Land and Hardwicke - International Centre, LaTouche House and IFSC House
- Oldbawn housing estate in Tallaght in the 1970s
- Marlay Grange Housing Estate in Rathfarnham in the 1960's
- Lansdowne Village, Dublin 4

Other developments

- Glenside, Annacotty, Co. Limerick.
- Bloomfield, Annacotty, Co. Limerick
- Alandale Square, Limerick City (Uncompleted Construction)
- Murrough Park, Renmore, Co. Galway.
- Viewmount, Rathdrum, Wicklow
- Derrymore, Ennis, Co. Clare

== See also ==
- G&T Crampton
- Cairn Homes
