= CPL Resources =

Human resources company based in Dublin

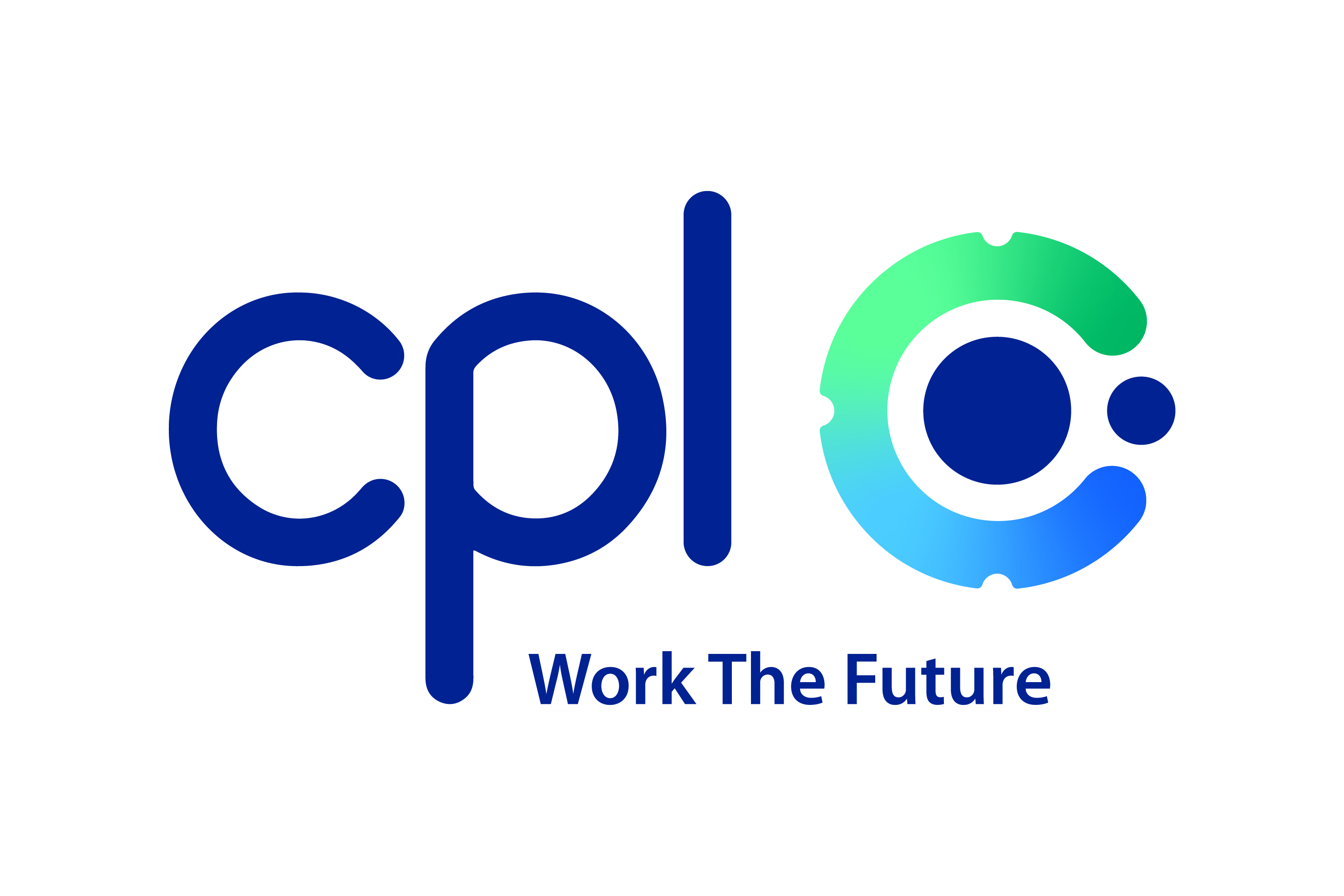
- Type: Public
- Traded as: Euronext Dublin: DQ5; AIM: CPS
- Industry: Human resources
- Founded: 1992
- Headquarters: Dublin, Ireland
- Area served: Europe
- Key people: Anne Heraty (founder); Paul Carrol (business development); Lorna Conn ( CEO); Josephine Tierney (CFO)
- Revenue: € 212,4 million (2009); € 257,6 million (2008)
- Net income: € 43.000 (2009); € 17,6 million (2008)
- Website: https://www.cpl.com/ie

CPL Resources is a human resources company based in Dublin that operates in Ireland and Europe. It was founded in 1992. CPL was founded by Anne Heraty and Keith O'Malley as Computer Placement Ltd in 1989. Currently, the group has 12 companies spread over 21 offices: 12 in the Republic of Ireland, two in Northern Ireland, and seven in the rest of Europe.

== Description ==
As of 2010, CPL consisted of 12 companies with 21 offices (excluding the place of work at the premises of CPL's customers):

- CPL: IT, construction, sales/marketing, call-centers (using companies and/or trade-names as: CPL Resourcing, CPL Solutions, CPL Engineering etc.)
- Careers Register – Finance, accounting, banking and insurance
- Tech Skills – Engineering and construction
- ThornShaw – Pharmaceutical & Medical Devices
- Flexsource – Industrial, Manufacturing, Hotel & Catering, Retail, Logistics, Construction and Warehousing
- Ardlinn – Executive Search consultancy specializing in senior appointments (€100,000+)
- Clinical Professionals Group – Europe's leading life science recruiter
- Covalen – Managed Services, Outsourcing, Consulting & Advisory Services.

== History ==
In 1989, Anne Heraty and Keith O'Malley founded Computer Placement Ltd. providing staff for the IT industry. In 1992, Heraty bought out the other shareholders, including O'Malley and became the 100% owner of CPL. In 1996, Heraty's husband Paul Carrol joined the company. Currently, he is the director of Business Development. In 1994, a restructuring of Computer Placement Ltd. started and from then on they used CPL mainly as a trade-name. The restructuring continued over the next few years and in 1996 the companies' CPL Engineering (construction) and CPL Solutions (IT/call centres) were founded. In 1997 the first new office opened in Limerick. In 1998, some new divisions were set up within Computer Placement Ltd: CPL Telecoms, CPL Sales and CPL Financial.

In July 2018, a Channel 4 investigation on Dispatches titled Inside Facebook: Secrets of a Social Network described CPL's role in providing content moderation services to Facebook through a team of employees who were instructed to allow certain types of graphic violence and hate speech to remain on Facebook. In March 2019, a former worker at CPL's Dublin location reported a high-pressure environment where moderators were required to evaluate videos containing graphic violence, child pornography, animal abuse, and other disturbing content with the expectation of meeting a 98% "quality rating".

== Mergers and acquisitions ==
CPL has acquired over a dozen companies during its existence. These were all acquired after its listing as a public company.

Company	Year	Market	Country of origin
Careers Register	2000	Financial	Ireland
Multiflex Human Resources	2002	Administration & Financial	Ireland
Tech Skills Resources	2002	Construction/Production	Ireland
Ann O'Brien	2002	Secretarial	Ireland
Marlborough Group Ltd temp contracts department	2002	Divers	Ireland
Thornshaw Recruitment	2004	Healthcare	Ireland
Nurse Finder	2006	Healthcare	United Kingdom
Eastlink Recruitment	2006	Production, IT, Construction, Financial	Ireland international active
Key6 Business Solutions	2007	IT/Consultancy/Management	Czech Republic and Slovakia
Northside Recruitment Service; Kate Cowhig International Recruitment; Richmond Recruitment Group	2007	General	Ireland
Techstaff International	2009	Technique	United Kingdom
Nifast	2009	Healthcare	Ireland
Ecom Intercations	2009	Financial customer care	Ireland
Kenny Whelan & Associates	2009	Contract and Permanent Recruitment	Ireland
Servisource	2010	Recruitment and Healthcare	Ireland
Clinical Professionals Ltd	2015	Scientific and Clinical recruitment	United Kingdom
Covalen	2019	Managed Services and Outsourcing	Ireland
Irish HomeCare	2024	Homecare	Ireland

== Financials ==
CPL's financial year runs from 1 July to 30 June of the next year. In the table below (and other text) the years mentioned are fiscal years. For example, 2010 means the fiscal year from 1 July 2009, up to and including 30 June 2010.

In the table below figures are published over the period FY 2006 – FY 2009 and also the figures over the first year that CPL was trading on the LSE and ISE (2000). Each figure is followed by its delta comparing it to the previous year with these exceptions:

- the delta between 2000 and 2006 is the average growth per year
- the delta over 2000 is a relative growth in %.

Item	FY 2009	Delta 2008	FY 2008		FY 2007	Delta 2006	FY 2006	Compared to 2000 avg.per year	FY 2000	Delta in % from 1999
Turnover in € mln	212,4	▼-45,2	257,6	▲62,1	195,5	▲47,4	148,1	▲20,4	26,0	▲25%
Free income € mln	35,0	▼-17,5	52,5	▲9,5	43,0	▲14,8	28,2	▲2,7	11,9	▲58%
Operatial profit in € mln	0,143	▼-19,6	19,8	▲1,3	18,5	▲8,2	10,3	▲0,97	4,5	▲45%
Net profit € mln	0,681	▼-17,3	18,0	▲1,2	16,8	▲7,5	9,3	▲1,05	3,0	▲48%
Profit per share in €cent	1,7	▼-46,5	48,3	▲3,3	45,0	▲20,1	24,9	▲2,6	9,3	▲29%

== Board of directors ==
The board of CPL Resources PLC. is per 30-06-2009 as follows:

Name	function/role	with CPL since	# shares holding as per 30-06-2009	=% of issued shares
Anne Heraty	CEO	1989	12.907.764	34,7
John Hennesy	non-executive chairman	1989	125.000	0,33
Paul Caroll	Business-Development	1996	2.234.061	6,01%
Brefni Byrne	non-exec mbr enumerations grp	1999	10.000	0,03%
Garnet Roche	CEO Flexsource	1995	63.192	0,17%
Mark Buckley	CFO	2013		
Oliver Tatton	non-executive	2007	0	0%

The percentages given in the last column of the table above are based on the number of issued shares as of June 2010. The number of issued shares is 37,199,825.

Heraty and her husband Carrol own over 40% of all issued shares in CPL Resources PLC. This stake in the company represents a value of €36 million based on the average price in May 2010 of €2.40. Using the year-low prices of approximately €1.45, as it was in June/July 2009, this represents a value of some €22 million.
