= DCC Energy =

Irish holding company

DCC Energy plc
- Type: Public limited company
- Traded as: LSE: DCC; FTSE 100 Component
- Industry: Business services
- Founded: 9 April 1976; 50 years ago in Dublin, Ireland
- Founder: Jim Flavin
- Headquarters: Dublin, Ireland
- Key people: Mark Breuer (Chair); Donal Murphy (CEO); Kevin Lucey (COO); Conor Murphy (CFO)
- Revenue: ▼£15,441.9 million (2026)
- Operating income: ▲£532.9 million (2026)
- Net income: ▼£28.2 million (2026)
- Website: www.dccenergy.com

DCC Energy plc (formerly DCC plc) is a multi-energy sales and distribution business operating in Europe and the US.

Headquartered in Dublin, DCC Energy plc is listed on the London Stock Exchange and is a constituent of the FTSE 100 Index.

== History ==
=== Foundation and diversification (1976–2010) ===
The company was founded by Jim Flavin in 1976 as Development Capital Corporation Limited. Originally the company focused on providing venture capital to start ups, however in the mid-1980s it changed direction and became an industrial holding company, changing its name to DCC and floating on the Irish Stock Exchange and London Stock Exchange in 1994.

During the 1990s, DCC expanded through a series of acquisitions across energy, technology, healthcare and support services, becoming involved with Flogas and Emo Oil in Ireland as well as a series of other deals.

The company was embroiled in a controversy over the issue of insider trading in Fyffes plc, the Irish fruit importing company in which a subsidiary of DCC, Lotus Green, held a stake which was sold in the year 2000. In 2002 Fyffes sued DCC over the sale of its stake in the company. The case was tried in the Irish High Court from December 2004 until July 2005 and DCC was cleared of insider trading. Fyffes appealed to the Supreme Court of Ireland and, in a judgement on 27 July 2007, the Supreme Court overturned the High Court's verdict and ruled that the documents that had been in Flavin's possession when DCC sold the shares had indeed been price sensitive. In April 2008, Fyffes settled its case against DCC for an amount of €37.6 million. As a result of this case, DCC and Flavin came under the examination of the Irish Director of Corporate Enforcement. In January 2010, The report of the High Court Inspector into the affairs of DCC plc was published. The Director of Corporate Enforcement concluded that no further action was warranted by his Office.

=== Expansion of the business (2011–2021) ===
The company acquired the heating oil distribution business of Bayford & Co operating in the north of England in 2009. Bayford also owned the UK rights to the Gulf forecourt brand. The company subsequently acquired Pace fuelcare from MRH in 2011.

In 2011, DCC bought Maxol's Home Heating company, Maxol Direct, which it re-branded as Emo Oil. In 2012, DCC spent around €100 million acquiring LPG (Liquefied Petroleum Gas) distribution businesses in the Netherlands, Britain, Sweden and Norway.

In August 2014, DCC announced that it reached an agreement with ExxonMobil to acquire the Esso Express petrol station network and the Esso Motorway concessions in France.

The company joined the FTSE 100 Index of the 100 companies listed on the London Stock Exchange with the highest market capitalisation in December 2015.

In February 2015, DCC completed the disposal of substantially all its Food & Beverage subsidiaries. During the same year the company acquired Butagaz S.A.S., a French LPG business, from Shell for €464 million. The acquisition made DCC Europe's third-largest LPG distributor.

In March 2016, the company agreed to acquire Alimentation Couche Tard's commercial and aviation fuels business in Denmark for €40 million. The deal included a 139-site retail petrol station network and supply contracts with 66 dealers.

In April 2017, DCC announced it had agreed to sell its Environmental division to Exponent, a private equity firm, for £219 million. The company also announced the acquisition of Shell's liquefied petroleum gas business in Hong Kong and Macau for £120 million, its first acquisition outside of Europe, and the retirement of its chief executive Tommy Breen.

In July 2017 Donal Murphy, previously Managing Director of DCC Energy, became Chief Executive.

In 2018, DCC Healthcare completed its first acquisition in the US Health and Beauty sector: Elite One Source Nutritional Services. In the same year DCC Technology purchased Stampede.

In 2019 DCC purchased the retail fuel operations of Tesco Ireland, with these being converted to automated stations under "Certa" branding. This branding is a variant of the "Certas" name which is used for home heating oil in the UK and as the holding company for their Esso branded stations in Europe.

In 2021, DCC acquired Almo Corporation in Group's largest acquisition to date.

=== Change in strategy and takeover offer ===
In 2022, DCC announced a new strategy for its energy businesses. The core of this strategy was to bring decarbonisation solutions for its 10 million energy customers. Various acquisitions were made in services and renewable energy – Protech, Sys EnR, DTGen and Centreco.

In September 2022, DCC Healthcare significantly expanded in medical devices with its largest acquisition to date, Medi-Globe.

In April 2025, a private equity business, Investindustrial acquired DCC Healthcare, and, in July 2025, another private equity business, Aurelius, acquired DCC Technology.

In April 2026, DCC rejected a £4.95 billion (£58-per-share) takeover proposal from KKR and Energy Capital Partners, saying it undervalued the company. Under Irish Takeover Panel rules, the consortium was given until 10 June to make a firm or improved offer. In June 2026, DCC said it would support a formal £5.7 billion takeover offer after the consortium raised its bid to £65.25 per share plus a final dividend. The founder of the business, Jim Flavin, criticised the decision saying the board had exercised "very poor judgment".

In July 2026, DCC plc changed its name to DCC Energy plc to reflect the Group's renewed focus on energy following the sale of DCC Healthcare and DCC Technology.

In September 2026, shareholders narrowly approved the sale to KKR and Energy Capital Partners, even though some investors, notably Aviva, Ninety One and Marathon Asset Management all said the deal was "selling DCC on the cheap". The founder of the business, Jim Flavin, renewed his criticism describing the offer as a "miserable bid".

== See also ==
- List of Irish companies
