= Cairn Homes =

Irish construction company

Cairn Homes PLC
- Cairn Homes logo
- Type: Public limited company
- Traded as: Euronext Dublin: C5H; LSE: CRN; ISEQ 20 component
- Industry: Construction and Real Estate Development
- Founded: 12 November 2014 (IPO 10 June 2015)
- Headquarters: Dublin, Ireland
- Key people: Michael Stanley, co-founded and CEO; Alan McIntosh, co-founded
- Products: Residential houses and apartments
- Revenue: €860.0 million (2024)
- Website: www.cairnhomes.com

Cairn Homes is an Irish house-builder and developer focusing on the Greater Dublin Area and other major urban areas of Ireland. The company is listed on Euronext Dublin and is a constituent member of the ISEQ 20 with a market capitalisation of €1.302 as of 3 July 2025. The company also has a secondary listing on the London stock exchange.

In June 2024, the company launched its first development outside of the Dublin area in Douglas, Cork.

The company completed the sale of 2,241 residential units in 2024, commenced over 4,100 units, had 10 new site commencements, and had 21 active sites at the end of 2024.

== History ==
Cairn Homes was co-founded in 2014 by Michael Stanley, Alan McIntosh and Kevin Stanley. Michael & Kevin Stanley’s father owned the company Shannon Homes. Founded in the 1970s, Shannon Homes was a major builder of new homes in Dublin. In 2005, Shannon Homes was split into two parts; Stanley and his brothers took one part of the company and renamed it Stanley Holdings, which went on to complete 450 units before being mothballed in 2008 to pay down its debts. However, because the company still needed to borrow for the remaining 50 acres of land on the Malahide Road, the Stanleys were ultimately brought into NAMA.

In 2014, Stanley and his brother Kevin decided to reopen the business and start refinancing the NAMA loan, and they were offered funding from private equity firms. At this point, Stanley met Alan McIntosh, who helped him pay off the NAMA loan and rolled the 50-acre site, known as Parkside, into the newly founded company, Cairn.

In July 2015, Cairn Homes plc floated on the London Stock Exchange, raising over €720 million, which helped the company grow its portfolio by acquiring sites from RTÉ and securing loans from Ulster Bank. Cairn joined the Irish Stock Exchange in July 2017 with an initial valuation of €1.1 billion, placing it among the top 10 ISEQ companies.

The company has marginally increased its financial and operational performance each year since it was founded with the exception of 2020 due to the effects of COVID-19 lockdowns.

The company has focused on the first-time buyers' market rather than high-end development. In recent years, Cairn has expanded its strategy by partnering with the Land Development Agency to work on high-density sites, such as their biggest one in Seven Mills, which will deliver mixed-tenure and cost-rental apartments. Moving into 2025, the company secured agreements to deliver approximately 2,150 social and affordable homes over a multi-year period.

=== Financial performance ===
| Year | 2016 | 2017 | 2018 | 2019 | 2020 | 2021 | 2022 | 2023 | 2024 | 2025 |
| Currency | € | € | € | € | € | € | € | € | € | € |
|---|---|---|---|---|---|---|---|---|---|---|
| Revenue in millions | ▲40.9 | ▲149.5 | ▲337.0 | ▲453.3 | ▼262.0 | ▲424.0 | ▲617.4 | ▲665.0 | ▲860.0 | ▲944.6 |
| Gross Profit in millions | ▲7.1 | ▲27.1 | ▲69.1 | ▲85.3 | ▼42.7 | ▲83.9 | ▲134.2 | ▲146.97 | ▲187.0 | ▲208.8 |
| Operating Profit in millions | ▲2.3 | ▲14.5 | ▲53.2 | ▲68.0 | ▼24.4 | ▲58.4 | ▲103.0 | ▲113.4 | ▲150.0 | ▲168.8 |
| Unit Sales Completed | ▲105 | ▲418 | ▲804 | ▲1,080 | ▼743 | ▲1,120 | ▲1,526 | ▲1,741 | ▲2,243 | ▲2,365 |

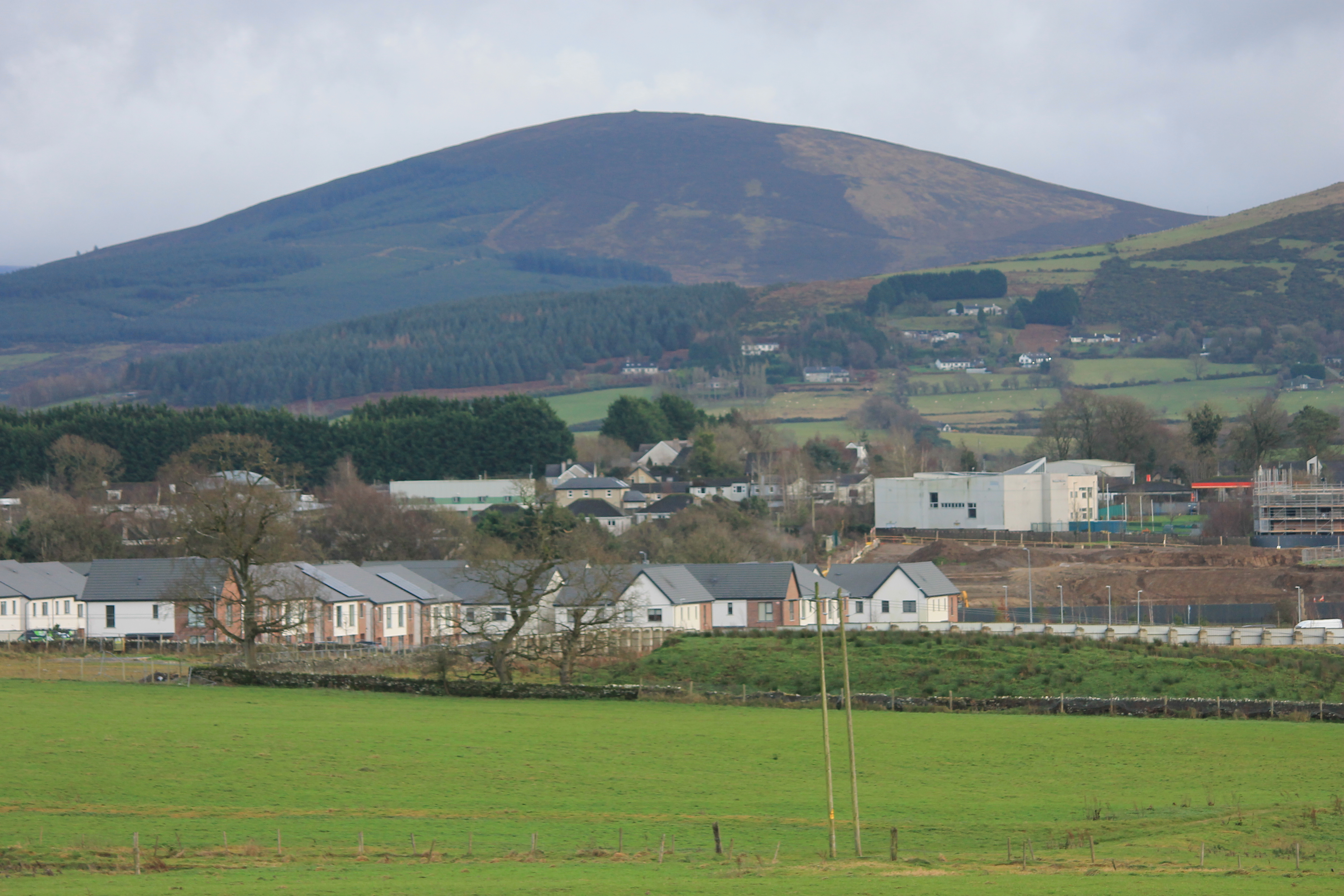
Cairn homes houses under construction near Blessington, County Wicklow.

==== 2024 Results ====
In 2024, the Company had a return on equity of 15.1% and an 8.2 cent dividend per share. Operating profit increased by 32% as compared to 2023. Revenue increased by 29% compared to 2023. Earnings per share for 2024 was 17.9 cents. The Company generated €134.7 million in operating cash flow.
