= Datalex =

Irish software company

Datalex plc
- Company type: Public limited company
- Traded as: Euronext: DLE; Euronext Growth
- Founded: 1985; 41 years ago
- Headquarters: Dublin, Ireland
- Key people: Sean Corkery, CEO; David Hargaden, Chairman
- Products: Travel software development
- Revenue: ▼US$27.5 million (2024)
- Number of employees: 158 (2025)
- Website: datalex.com

Datalex is a software development company headquartered in Dublin, Ireland. It works mostly with airlines to develop travel software, such as booking websites, and counts LATAM, easyJet, Virgin Australia, Air China and JetBlue among its customers. It is a publicly listed company on Euronext Dublin.

== History ==
=== Early years (1980s–2012) ===
A precursor to Datalex was Channel Automation Services (CAS), a company started by Scottish businessman Neil Wilson in 1983. In 1984, IDA Ireland asked Wilson if he would set up an Irish office in Dublin. The next year, Wilson sold his stake in CCS and founded Datalex with IDA grants. To begin with, Datalex produced check-in and reservations technology but the decline of the airline industry in the late 1980s focused the company on global distribution systems. At first, the company sold services to larger pre-existing global distribution companies, such as Sabre and Sita but by 1998, Datalex had grown to be a major firm of the travel industry in its own right. At that time, an estimated one-sixth of the world's travel agents used Datalex technology in day-to-day bookings and reservations. The next year, Datalex floated itself on the Nasdaq and London Stock Exchanges and raised $30 million in private funds. It subsequently de-listed from Nasdaq.

=== Brogan era (2012–2019) ===
In 2012, Aidan Brogan took over as CEO after Cormac Whelan stepped down, aiming to stem the annual losses that Datalex had been suffering for several years.

By 2013, Datalex had produced an annual profit of $1.1m and the next year, announced its first shareholder dividend in the company's 29-year history. Datalex opened a new office in Beijing in 2014 in an effort to access the growth of the Chinese market.

2017 saw an increased net profit of $7.1m and revenue of $63.9m due to new contracts with international deals with Chinese and European airlines.

On the British exit from the EU, Brogan commented that as the company was "geographically spread", it had "in-built resilience" to "local issues such as Brexit". He stated that the company's Manchester office, where around 40 people are employed, would stay open but also noted that the Brexit negotiations were "not helpful for anybody".

In September 2018, Datalex's CFO, David Kennedy announced he would step down at the end of the year, ending an 11-year stint at the company. The next month, Datalex signed a deal with Scandinavian Airlines to improve the airline's digital strategy.

=== Revenue irregularities (2019–2020) ===
On 15 January 2019, Datalex issued a shock profit warning revealing it had misstated revenues in relation to a major customer (thought to be Lufthansa) in the first half of the previous year. Datalex warned that it expected to report an adjusted earnings before interest, tax, depreciation and amortisation (EBITDA) loss of between $1m (€870,000) and $4m (€3.5m), compared with the consensus view among analyst for an almost $16m profit (€14.1m). This represents a difference of as much as $20m (€17.6m) and would result in the company making a loss for 2018.

As a result of the announcement, Datalex's share price slumped by 59% the same day, its market value dropping from €191m to €78m. The profit alert came only eight weeks after Datalex issued a positive trading update, saying it had been performing in line with expectations up to 23 November 2018 and that it was “confident” about delivering double-digit percentage EBITDA growth for the full year.

On 6 February 2019, Ireland's Central Bank opened an investigation into the company's November trading statement after Datalex appointed auditors PwC to review a possible accounting issue. After the announcement, shares in the company dropped by 1%.

On 14 February 2019, Datalex announced it planned to cut jobs from its workforce of 500 people (including staff and consultants) in an effort to save up to $10m (€8.8m) a year in costs. The company announcement did not specify to how many people would be let go.

On 19 February 2019, Datalex announced that its new CFO, Dónal Rooney (who joined the company in December 2018), was stepping down from the company board but remaining with the company until April to assist with the transition to the next CFO and to help advance a number of "critical ongoing organisational projects".

In April 2019, company Chairman Paschal Taggart announced he would resign after the company's AGM later in the year. He said he would have liked to have done a "far better job" and that "somebody had to fall on their sword in these situations". The same month, the Irish Times reported that CEO Aidan Brogan had threatened Taggart with legal proceedings after the profit warning in January and told him to limit his contact with clients and employees.

Datalex's shares were suspended on 1 May after the company missed a regulatory deadline to publish its full-year results. Datalex's share price closed at €0.916 on the Euronext ISEQ on 30 April and were not traded the next day. Datalex's shares stayed suspended until July 2020, after the company's accounts were reviewed and the company complied with market transparency rules.

On 3 May 2019, Brogan resigned with immediate effect with Sean Corkery taking up the role of acting CEO. On 14 May, former Google executive Niall O'Sullivan was announced to be the firm's new CFO, replacing Dónal Rooney. On 16 May, the Irish Times reported that Datalex had been in takeover talks with an unnamed software firm before the issuing of the profit warning.

On 2 August 2019, the company said it expected to report a loss between $4–6 million for 2018 and to also suspend its profit guidance for 2019 and 2020 until the end of the review of its accounts. Seán Corkery said he and Niall O'Sullivan would review the firm's “investment in product development and expect to report a significant exceptional cost” in the accounts for 2018. The Irish Times also reported that billionaire Dermot Desmond had injected €10m in the company to keep it afloat.

On 6 September 2019, Datalex reported a $50 million loss for 2018 though auditor EY declined to give an opinion on the company's finances. The next day Lufthansa announced it had ended its contract with Datalex. The firm said they would challenge the legality of the termination notice.

At Datalex's AGM in mid-September, acting-CEO Sean Corkery said that former management had misled the board and suggested that legal action might be taken against them to recover $3.8 million that had been wrongly used to fund shareholder dividends. It was also reported by the Irish Times that Cyril McGuire, a technology entrepreneur, and Michael Chadwick, a former director of Grafton, had also put money into Datalex.

In October 2019, it was announced that Sean Corkery, who had been interim CEO since May, had been appointed CEO in a permanent capacity. The next month, David Hargaden, CEO of Unity Technology Solutions, an Irish IT firm, assumed the role of chairman of the company's board. Hargaden was officially elected by shareholders in February 2020, alongside Christine Ourmieres-Widener and Mike McGearty, two new non-executive directors.

In April 2020, the firm announced a wave of redundancies due to the impact of the COVID-19 pandemic. In July, it was reported that Dermot Desmond had agreed to provide an extra €10m debt provision, which Datalex could draw on "if required"; the billionaire at that point owned nearly 30% of the company. Later that month, Datalex's shares resumed trading after being suspended for almost 15 months, sliding almost 75% within a day.

In a November 2020 trading update, the firm increased its predicted 2020 EBITDA from $0.75m to $1.5m to between $3.75m and $4.5m after it reported the renewal of a "significant" Chinese contract.

=== Delisting (2025) ===
In May 2025, Datalex reported "lower revenues and wider losses" for the preceding financial year. Later in 2025, the company announced its intention to de-list from the Euronext Growth index.

== See also ==
- List of companies of Ireland
