= Conroy Gold and Natural Resources =

Irish mineral mining company

Conroy Gold and Natural Resources PLC
- Type: Public
- Traded as: LSE: CGNR
- ISIN: IE00BZ4BTZ13
- Industry: Gold and Natural Resources
- Founded: 1995
- Founders: Richard Conroy
- Headquarters: Citywest Business Campus, Dublin 24, Dublin, Ireland
- Area served: Europe
- Website: www.conroygoldandnaturalresources.com

Conroy Gold and Natural Resources Plc is a listed mineral exploration and development company focusing on Ireland and Finland which was founded by Richard Conroy in 1995. The company is listed on the London Stock Exchange.

The company discovered a gold trend in the Longford-Down Massif in Ireland on the Orlock Bridge Fault which it developed as part of a joint venture project looking specifically at the Clontibret area of County Monaghan.

The company originally included a diamond mining division until this was hived off into a separate company named Karelian Diamond Resources Plc (LSE: KDR) in 2004.
