= Permanent TSB =

Irish banking group

Permanent TSB Group Holdings plc
- Type: Public limited company
- Traded as: Euronext Dublin: PTSB; LSE: PTSB; ISEQ 20 component
- ISIN: IE00BWB8X525
- Industry: Financial services
- Founded: 1816
- Headquarters: Dublin, Ireland
- Key people: Julie O'Neill, (Chair); Eamonn Crowley, (CEO)
- Products: Banking, asset management
- Revenue: ▼€655 million (2025)
- Operating income: ▼€128 million (2025)
- Net income: ▼€114 million (2025)
- Total assets: ▲€30,465 million (2025)
- Total equity: ▼€2,482 million (2025)
- Owner: Government of Ireland (57.4%); Goldman Sachs (5.8%)
- Number of employees: 2,614 (2022)
- Website: permanenttsbgroup.ie

Permanent TSB Group Holdings plc, formerly Irish Life and Permanent plc and trading as PTSB is a provider of personal financial services in Ireland. Irish Life Assurance plc and the Irish Permanent Building Society merged to form the Irish Life and Permanent Group in 1999, and the merged entity acquired the Trustee Savings Bank in 2001. The group has no connection to the UK's TSB Bank.

== History ==
The bank is historically derived from three different companies:

- Irish Life Assurance
- Irish Permanent Building Society
- Trustee Savings Bank (no relation to the British bank of the same name)

Irish Life Assurance plc (founded 1939) and the Irish Permanent Building Society (founded 1884) merged to form the Irish Life and Permanent Group in 1999, and the merged entity acquired the Trustee Savings Bank (founded 1816) in 2001.

=== Irish Life Assurance ===
Irish Life was a life assurance company created in 1939 with state assistance and concentrated on life assurance and investment products.

- The City of Dublin Assurance Company
- the Irish Life and General Assurance Company
- the Irish National Assurance Company
- the Munster and Leinster Assurance Company

were amalgamated.

Later some British companies shed their Irish operations, and merged them into this new company. They were:

- the Prudential
- the Britannic
- the Liverpool Victoria Friendly Society
- the Pearl
- the Refuge

Shares in the business were sold to the public in July 1991. In 1965 Irish Life entered the UK market and competed against its former parent, initially under its own name.

In 1999, Irish Life Assurance plc and the Irish Permanent Building Society merged to form the Irish Life and Permanent Group. In March 2012, Irish Life Assurance was sold to the Irish State for €1.3 billion as part of a bank recapitalisation programme following the Irish financial crisis.

=== Irish Permanent Building Society ===
Permanent TSB, previously the Irish Permanent Building Society, was founded as The Irish Temperance Permanent Benefit Building Society which was founded in 1884. In 1940 under new managing director Edmund Farrell its name was changed to Irish Permanent Building Society. Farrell, and later his son, Edmund Farrell Jnr managed the building society until about 1990.

In 1992 Irish Permanent Finance, specialising in auto finance, was established. In 1992 branch operations were opened in London and Belfast. In 1992 a Banking subsidiary established in the Isle of Man.

In 1994 the Irish private banking operation of Guinness & Mahon was acquired. In 1996 Capital Home Loans, a UK mortgage lender, was acquired.

It was a mutual organisation, jointly owned by those saving and borrowing. It demutualised to form a plc on 21 September 1994. Irish Permanent was a predominantly personal banking and mortgage company.

In 1999, Irish Life Assurance plc and the Irish Permanent Building Society merged to form the Irish Life and Permanent Group.

=== Trustee Savings Bank ===
The origins of the TSB Bank date back to 1816 when the first Irish savings bank was established in Waterford. Shortly afterwards, savings banks were established in Cork, Dublin, Monaghan and Limerick.

The Dublin and Monaghan banks merged in 1977, followed by the amalgamation of the Cork and Limerick banks in 1986.

In 1988, Waterford was incorporated into the Dublin bank and finally, in 1992, Cork and Limerick Savings Bank amalgamated with Trustee Savings Bank Dublin, to form TSB Bank. It was purchased by Irish Life and Permanent from the Government of Ireland in 2001.

=== Permanent TSB ===
In 2001, Irish Life and Permanent Group acquired the Irish Trustee Savings Bank from the Government of Ireland, and rebranded as Permanent TSB.

During the Irish banking crisis the group was split. The profitable Irish Life Group was purchased by the government for €1.3 billion, and subsequently sold to Great-west Lifeco in July 2013. The bank received a further €2.7 billion of capital from the Irish State, bringing it into majority state ownership.

The bank has over one million customers in Ireland. The chief executive of Permanent TSB is Eamonn Crowley, who succeeded Jeremy Masding in that capacity in June 2020.

In March 2011, during the Irish banking crisis the bank was said to be in need of an external €4.0 billion bailout.

In February 2011 SEB (Skandinaviska Enskilda Banken AB) acquired Irish Life International Ltd (ILI), so it now operates under the corporate name Life International Assurance Company Limited.

On 19 February 2013, Great-West Lifeco of Canada announced its acquisition of the Irish Life Group for €1.3 billion. This was disputed by the shareholders. The Supreme Court rejected the shareholders' application to delay the sale, pending the hearing of their challenge of the sale. This was heard on 21 January 2014, and concluded on 13 February 2014. Judgement was reserved and on 15 August 2014 the case was referred to Europe.

In October 2016, the US bank Cerberus Capital Management bought the UK loan book.

In July 2022, Permanent TSB received approval to acquire a €7.6 billion Ulster Bank loan book by the Competition & Consumer Protection Commission, along with 25 branch properties. Former competitor, Ulster Bank had announced its withdrawal of services from the Republic of Ireland in February 2021.

In June 2023, the Irish Government and NatWest Group each sold 5% stakes in the bank leaving them with 57.4% and 11.7% share respectively.

In October 2023, Permanent TSB launched an overhaul of its brand and business, rebranding to PTSB, following its acquisition of a large portion of Ulster Bank which was withdrawing from the Republic of Ireland.

On 30 October 2025, PTSB announced that it was putting itself up for sale. The decision came as a way to return the company to private ownership after being majority owned by the state. As of March 2026, several parties had made bids and were in the running to acquire PTSB, including Centerbridge Partners (with J.C. Flowers & Co. as a possible partner), Austria's Bawag bank, and US private equity firm Lone Star.

In July 2025, NatWest sold all of its remaining shares in PTSB.

In April 2026, Austrian lender BAWAG agreed to acquire PTSB in an all-cash deal which valued the company at approximately €1.62 billion. The acquisition marked the end of the Irish government's direct ownership in the country's retail banks following the financial crisis-era bailouts.

== See also ==
- List of banks in the euro area
- List of banks in the Republic of Ireland
