= Euronext Dublin =

Irish stock exchange

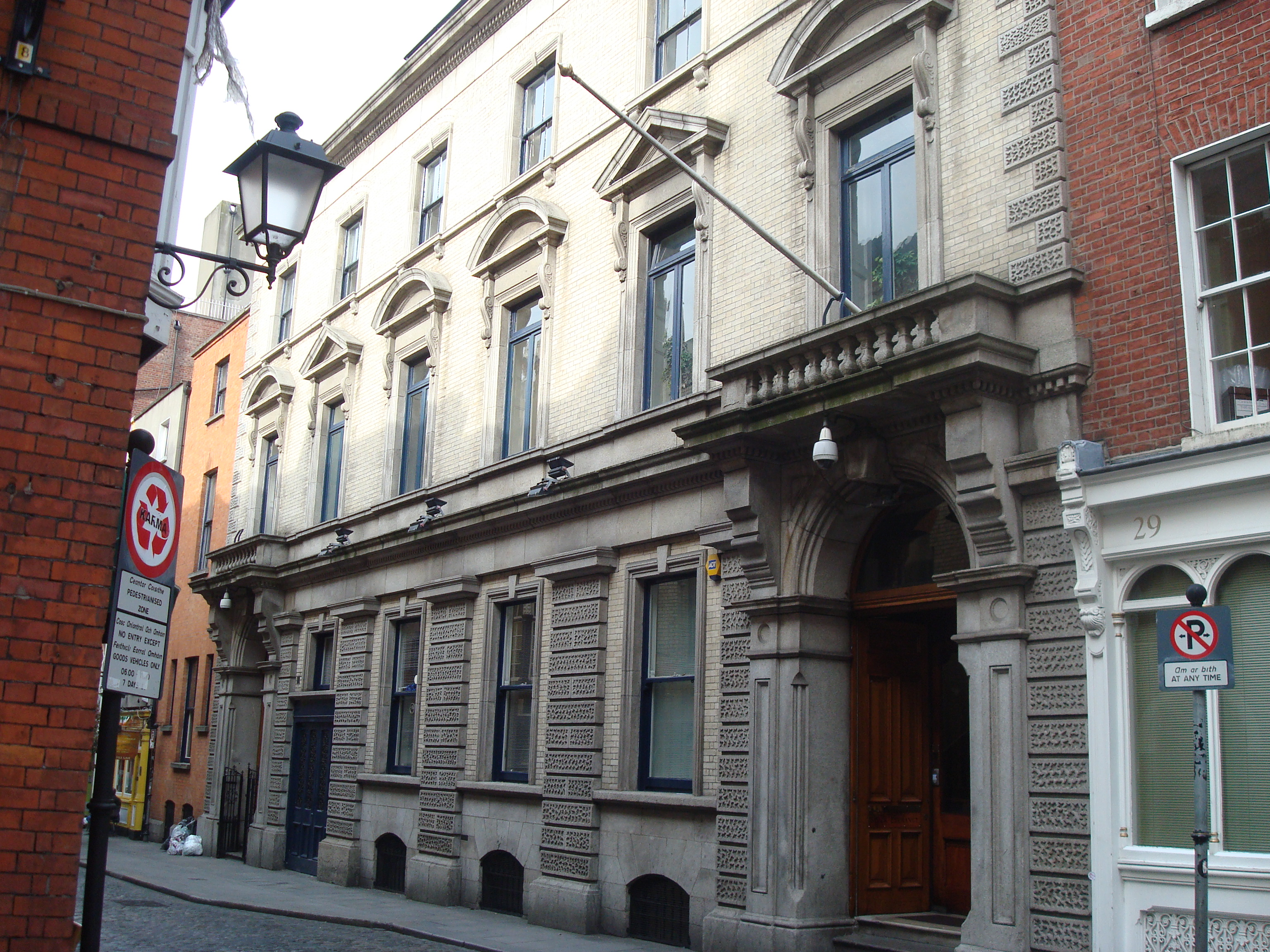
- Type: Stock exchange
- Location: Dublin, Ireland
- Coordinates: 53°20′42.2″N 6°15′41.7″W
- Founded: 1793; 233 years ago; 1799 (statutory)
- Owner: Euronext
- Key people: Daryl Byrne (CEO); Padraic O'Connor (Chairman)
- Currency: Euro (EUR)
- No. of listings: 50
- Market cap: $127.117 billion (Jun 2026)
- Indices: ISEQ 20
- Website: www.euronext.com/en/markets/dublin

Euronext Dublin (formerly the Irish Stock Exchange, ISE; Irish: Stocmhalartán na hÉireann) is Ireland's main stock exchange, and has been in existence since 1793.

The Euronext Dublin lists debt and fund securities and is used as a European gateway exchange for companies seeking to access investors in Europe and beyond. With over 35,000 securities listed on its markets, the exchange is used by over 4,000 issuers from more than 85 countries to raise funds and access international investors.

A study by Indecon (international economic consultants) published in 2014 on the Irish Stock Exchange found that having a local stock market and securities industry directly supports 2,100 jobs in Ireland and is worth €207 million each year to the Irish economy. It also found that having a domestic securities industry centred on the Irish Stock Exchange generates €207 million in estimated direct economic impact (measured in Gross Value Added or GDP) and €230 million in direct tax for the Irish exchequer (including stamp duty on trading in Irish shares).

The exchange is regulated by the Central Bank of Ireland under the Markets in Financial Instruments Regulations (MiFID) and is a member of the World Federation of Exchanges and the Federation of European Stock Exchanges.

== History ==
Stock Exchange (Dublin) Act 1799 (Note: Short title given by Short Titles Act 1962 (No. 5))
- Act of Parliament
- Parliament of Ireland
- Long title: An Act for the better regulation of Stock Brokers.
- Citation: 39 Geo. 3. c. 60 (I)
- Territorial extent: Ireland

Dates
- Royal assent: 1 June 1799
- Commencement: 24 June 1799 (Note: Section 1.)
- Repealed: 3 July 1879
Other legislation
Repealed by	Statute Law Revision (Ireland) Act 1879

Status: Repealed

Text of statute as originally enacted

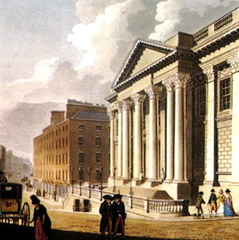
An engraving of the exchange in the early 1800s by James Malton

The Irish Stock Exchange was first recognised by legislation in 1799 when the Irish Parliament passed the Stock Exchange (Dublin) Act 1799 (39 Geo. 3. c. 60 (I)). The exchange originally operated from the Royal Exchange and was built so that businessmen could sell goods and commodities and trade bills of exchange. In different periods of its history, the ISE included a number of regional exchanges, including the Cork and Dublin exchanges. In 1973, the Irish exchange merged with British and other Irish stock exchanges becoming part of the International Stock Exchange of Great Britain and Ireland (now called the London Stock Exchange).

In 1837, Samuel Lewis records the stock exchange offices as having moved from the Royal Exchange to the Commercial Buildings on Dame Street, close to the present day offices of the stock exchange at Anglesea Street in Temple Bar, stating that:

"the increase in commercial business since the erection of this building having required additional accommodation in a situation more convenient for mercantile transactions, the Exchange has been gradually deserted and the meetings held there transferred to the Commercial Buildings in College-green".

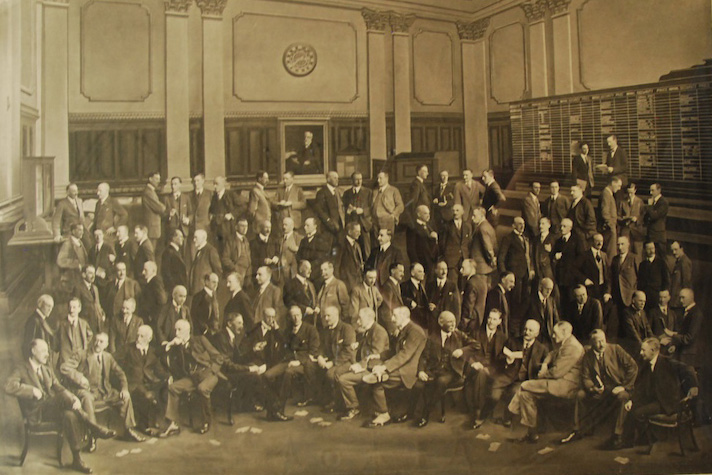
The Dublin Stock Exchange on Anglesea street in 1924.

Under the Stock Exchange Act 1995 (No. 9) it became independent again and in April 2014 it demutualised changing its corporate structure and becoming a plc which is owned by a number of stockbroking firms.

At the time of its demutualisation, the country's main stockbrokers received shares in the €56m-valued exchange and dividing up €26m in excess cash. Davy Stockbrokers took the largest stake, at 37.5 per cent, followed by Goodbody Stockbrokers with 26.2 per cent; Investec with 18 per cent; the then Royal Bank of Scotland Group 6.3 per cent; Cantor Fitzgerald 6 per cent; and Campbell O’Connor with 6 per cent.

In March 2018, Euronext completed the purchase of the ISE, and renamed the ISE as Euronext Dublin.

== Markets ==
The Irish Stock Exchange operates four markets – the Main Securities Market, the principal market for Irish and overseas companies; the Enterprise Securities Market (ESM), an equity market designed for growth companies; the Global Exchange Market (GEM), a specialist debt market for professional investors and the Atlantic Securities Market (ASM), a market dedicated to companies who wish to dual list in Ireland and the United States.

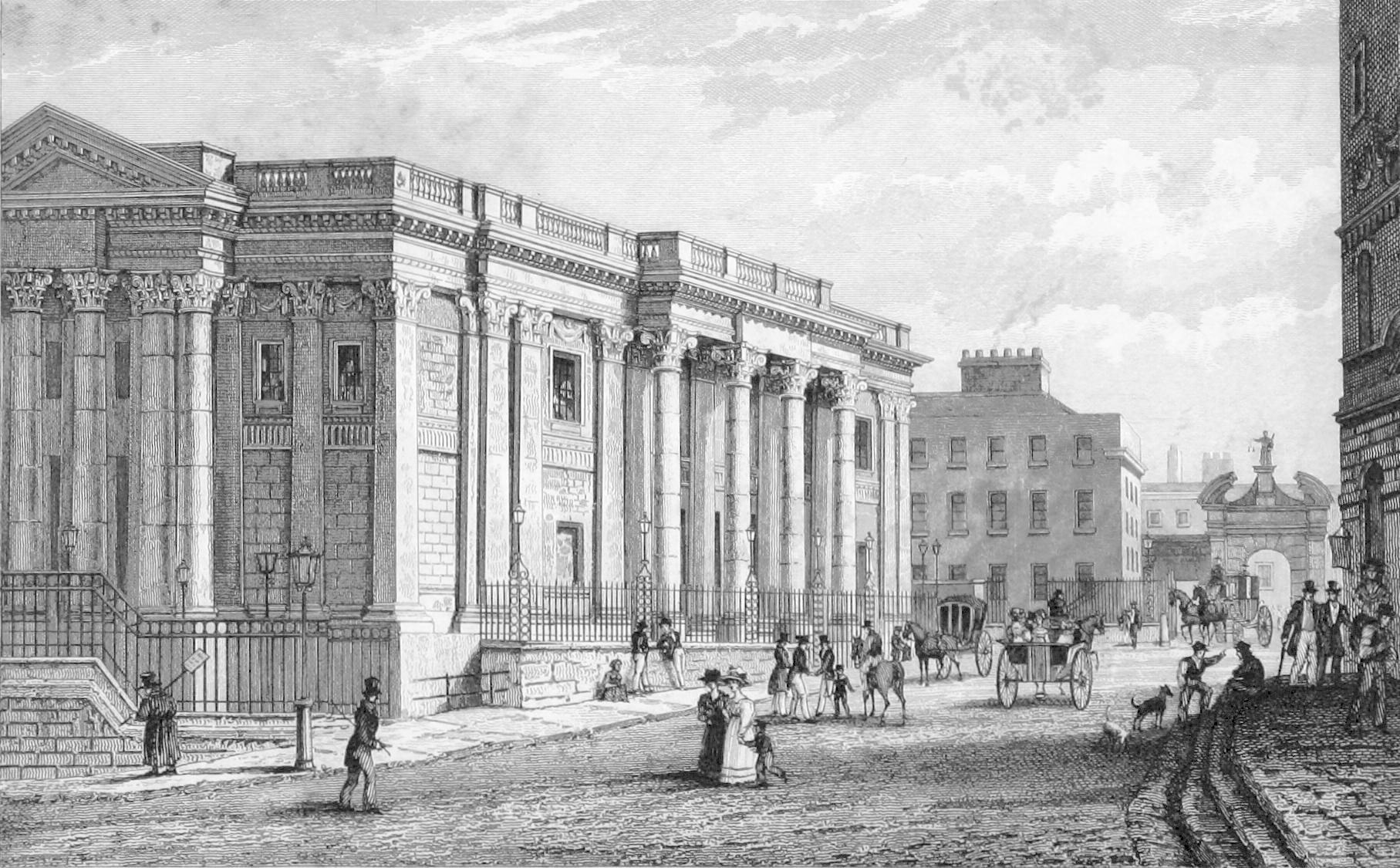
The Royal Exchange in 1837

== Equity markets for listed companies ==
There are currently 50 companies with shares listed on the markets of the Irish Stock Exchange.

There are three markets on which for companies to list equities on the ISE:

- The Main Securities Market (MSM), suited to larger companies with substantial funding needs
- The Enterprise Securities Market (ESM), for high-growth companies raising equity in earlier stages of development
- The Atlantic Securities Market (ASM), for multinational companies that want to broaden their investor reach to include dollar and euro pools of capital in a streamlined manner

== Money raised ==
In 2016, 11 companies trading on the ISE raised €513m in equity funds from international investors. New equity listings in 2016 came from Venn Life Sciences, Draper Esprit, and Dalata Hotel Group, which transferred its listing from the ESM to a primary listing on the MSM in June 2016.

In 2015 the largest biotech ever to IPO in Europe took place on the ISE when Malin Corporation, an Irish-based global life sciences company, raised €330m from international investors in an exclusive listing on the ISE. Three other IPOs took place in 2015 raising a further €650m: Applegreen, Permanent TSB and Hostelworld.

In 2014 three companies joined the ISE's markets: Dalata Hotel Group, the largest hotel operator in Ireland, Irish Residential Properties REIT plc, the first residentially focused REIT to list in Ireland and Mainstay Medical, an Irish medical device company.

These three companies raised a combined total of €700 at IPO. Total fund raising in 2014 of listed companies was €1.7 billion.

== Trading and membership ==
The ISE offers domestic and international membership for trading in shares, ETFs, Irish Government bonds and other securities.

The ISE's electronic processing system is called ISE Xetra and is provided in partnership with Deutsche Börse since the ISE closed its trading floor in Anglesea Street (a listed building) Dublin 2 on 6 June 2000. Shares trading on the ISE are settled by Euroclear Bank and cleared by Eurex Clearing AG.

The ISE is the main centre of liquidity in Irish shares. The company with the highest turnover on the ISE in 2016 was CRH. This was followed Ryanair, Paddy Power Betfair, Bank of Ireland and Kerry Group.

Trading volumes on the exchange in 2011 were about a quarter of the 2007 peak. In June 2012, following the collapse of a stockbroker, the Sunday Independent asked "Will there even be a stand-alone Irish equity market in five years' time? The omens are not good." However this has proven not to be the case as in 2016 the number of equity trades had increased by 17.4% to 6.6m, up from 5.6m in 2015, the first time trading has reached over 6m trades and the sixth consecutive year of growth in trade numbers.

== Debt markets ==
The ISE is among the leading centres globally for the listing of debt securities with statistics showing debt listings growing by more than 7% in 2016 to reach over 29,000 securities. The ISE was ranked at #2 among global exchanges according to rankings released by the World Federation of Exchanges (WFE) at the end of December 2016.

The ISE offers two markets for the listing of debt securities: the Global Exchange Market (GEM), an exchange-regulated market and multilateral trading facility (MTF), for banks, companies and sovereigns listing debt, and the Main Securities Market (MSM). Major global companies listing debt on ISE's markets include Vodafone plc, Whirlpool, Canada Pension Plan Investment Board, Kingdom of Saudi Arabia, Barclays, Goldman Sachs, Ryanair, Coca-Cola and Ferrari.

== Fund markets ==
The ISE is the #1 centre for listing investment funds and Exchange Traded Funds (ETFs) globally according to statistics released by the World Federation of Exchanges (WFE), with 1,041 new fund classes admitted in 2016. Global investment managers can choose from one of two markets when listings funds: the MSM or GEM.

Notable investment managers listing funds on ISE markets include Tideway, BNY Mellon, PIMCO and Fidelity Investments.

== ISEFundHub ==
In 2014 the ISE launched ISEFundHub, an information portal for funds listed on the ISE and funds domiciled in Ireland. The portal displays important information such as fund net asset values (NAVs) and key fund documents as well as extensive performance-based analytics. The service is offered by the ISE in partnership with FundConnect, a Danish-based funds infrastructure provider in the European market.

== Other services ==
Legal Entity Identifier (LEI) services

The ISE is endorsed by the Regulatory Oversight Committee (ROC) and sponsored by the Central Bank of Ireland as a Local Operating Unit (LOU) for the processing of Legal Entity Identifier (LEI) services for Ireland. LEIs are codes designed to create a global reference data system that uniquely identifies every legal entity or structure, in any jurisdiction, that is party to a financial transaction. Businesses may apply for an LEI code through ISEdirect. LEIs were brought in by global regulators as part of the response to the 2008 financial crisis.

International Securities Identity Number (ISIN) services

An International Securities Identity Number (ISIN) is a code that uniquely identifies a specific securities issue. The ISE is the National Numbering Agency in Ireland for ISIN codes and is a member of the global industry body the Association of National Numbering Agencies (ANNA).

Information services

The ISE is the official source of market data on ISE markets and publishes a range of market indices. The published index of shares is known as the Irish Stock Exchange Quotient or ISEQ Overall Index. Other equity indexes of the exchange include the ISEQ ESM Index, the ISEQ 20, the ISEQ General, ISEQ SmallCap, and ISEQ Financial. The ISE also has two other ISEQ 20 based indices, the ISEQ 20 Capped Index and the ISEQ 20 Leveraged Strategy Index.

The ISE also publishes a range of bond indices.

Announcement services

The ISE files and publish regulatory documents and announcements for issuers enabling them to comply with their regulatory obligations.

== Criticism ==
Two reports of an investigation into the "wholly inappropriate sale of perpetual bonds" by Davy Stockbrokers to credit unions failed to involve any of the credit unions affected, leaving them "in the dark and powerless to add any value to the findings of this investigation". The ISE, who have Davy as one of its largest shareholders, then declined to give them access to the reports. The chairman of one of the Credit Union's who suffered large losses told his members "The failure to publish the reports is to place the complaints process in a shroud of secrecy. Such a failure of openness, transparency and fairness can only serve to undermine confidence in the complaints process, forcing those with grievances into the courts. Such a course of action is not in the interest of any of the stakeholders".

In April 2010, Financial Regulator at the Central Bank of Ireland told the same committee that "senior management of the exchange should step up to the plate" after failing to help charities, credit unions and rich individuals who received letters informing them that many investments made by stockbrokers over the past decade are now worthless.

The Central Bank began an unprecedented investigation into the entire stockbroking community in December 2011. The 12-month-long investigation found "major problems" and that there would have to be mergers of firms to ensure the industry survives. This merger process will have to be done in a controlled way – because any instability in the sector could pose a danger to many people's savings, and prevent new businesses from raising money at a time when banks are not lending.

In September 2012 it was forced to issue a correction after it reported figures to the market that suggested a surge in trading in government bonds, in one case as much as 85pc of the year's volume of trades were reported to have gone through the system in a single day.

== See also ==
- List of stock exchanges
