= Adriaan van Well =

Dutch entrepreneur, founder of Spar (1898–1967)

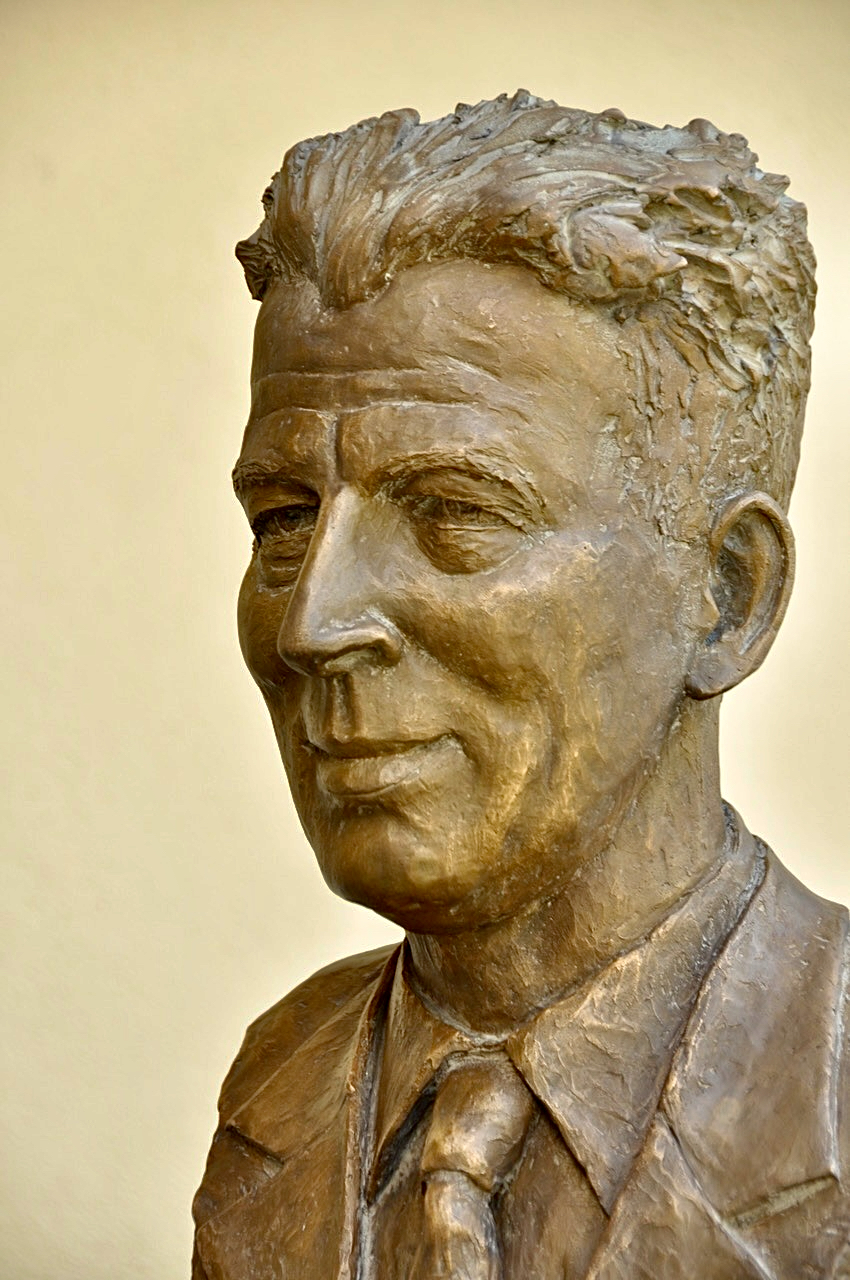
- Bust by Lia Krol
- Born: 24 December 1898; Zegwaart, Netherlands
- Died: 19 August 1967 (aged 68); The Hague, Netherlands
- Occupation: Entrepreneur
- Known for: Founding Spar
- Spouse: Huberta Wubben

Adrianus Johannes Maria "Adriaan" van Well (24 December 1898 – 19 August 1967) was a Dutch entrepreneur, credited as the founder of the supermarket chain Spar on 28 June 1932.

== History with Spar ==
In 1880 Adriaan's grandfather Antonius van Well had started a shop selling liquor and groceries in Zegwaart, The Netherlands, which was later taken over by Adriaan's father Louis. He operated as a wholesaler selling to grocers in the region.

Adriaan van Well took over the business of his father in the 1930s, during a severe economic crisis. Influenced by an American example of Voluntary Chain Stores, he came up with a business model whereby retailers not only buy together but also collaborate on sales and advertising, an approach that had hardly been tried out in Europe. He had come up with this idea through an article by Johan Frederik ten Doesschate in a trade journal for wholesalers. Ten Doesschate stated that "by purchasing and advertising together, costs would decrease". Buying from fewer suppliers left more time for selling. Wholesalers would be less bothered by small orders."

In June 1932, sixteen shop-owners in the Dutch province South-Holland decided to participate in his venture for which Van Well choose as logo "de Spar", which means "spruce tree" in the Dutch language. A tree that remains green all year round. Later, a motto was chosen: "Door Eendrachtig Samenwerken Profiteren Allen Regelmatig": DESPAR, which translates into: “All benefit from joint co-operation”. Employees at the company jokingly said that the motto also could have been: “All benefits from the joint co-operation go to Adriaan”.

The concept of the voluntary branch company appeared successful and in 1934 a joint head office was opened. In 1937, 2000 grocers had joined De Spar. From 1947 onwards, Spar stores were opened in Belgium and West Germany followed by other countries in Europe and the African continent. Adriaan van Well founded Spar International in 1953, headquartered in Amsterdam, the Netherlands.

== Awards ==
- During the 25 years anniversary of Spar, on June 27th 1957, Adriaan van Well was knighted in the Order of Orange Nassau.
- He was knighted in the Order of the Crown of Belgium on November 14th, 1957.

== Spar following van Well's death ==
When Van Well died in 1967 at the age of 68, Spar had stores in 15 countries with a total turnover of 8 billion Dutch guilders. Van Well left behind his wife Huberta van Well-Wubben, six sons, and two daughters. His four eldest sons continued to manage the South-Holland Spar company under the name Royal A.J.M. van Well BV until 1987, when the company was acquired by Schuitema NV.

In 2007 Sperwer and the Sligro Food Group both acquired 45% of the shares in the Dutch Spar Holding. The remaining 10% is in the hands of Spar retailers.

In 2022, Spar International made a turnover of 43.5 billion euros with 14,000 stores in 48 countries, of which 453 in the Netherlands, where Spar was founded.
