= Spar (retailer) =

Dutch multinational retail company and franchisor

SPAR International B.V.
- Type: Private
- Industry: Retail
- Founded: 1932; 94 years ago
- Headquarters: Amsterdam, Netherlands
- Number of locations: 13,996 stores (worldwide, 2022)
- Area served: Worldwide (48 countries as of 2022)
- Products: Grocers' shops, convenience shops, discount shops, hypermarkets
- Revenue: ▲€43.5 billion (2022)
- Number of employees: 460,000 (2022)
- Website: spar-international.com

SPAR International B.V., originally "DESPAR", styled as "DE SPAR" (Dutch pronunciation: [də ˈspɑr]), is a Dutch multinational company that provides branding, supplies and support services for independently owned and operated food retail stores. It was founded in the Netherlands in 1932 by Adriaan van Well, although the largest number of stores are located in the United Kingdom.

Logo without the red box, used in Northern Ireland and other markets

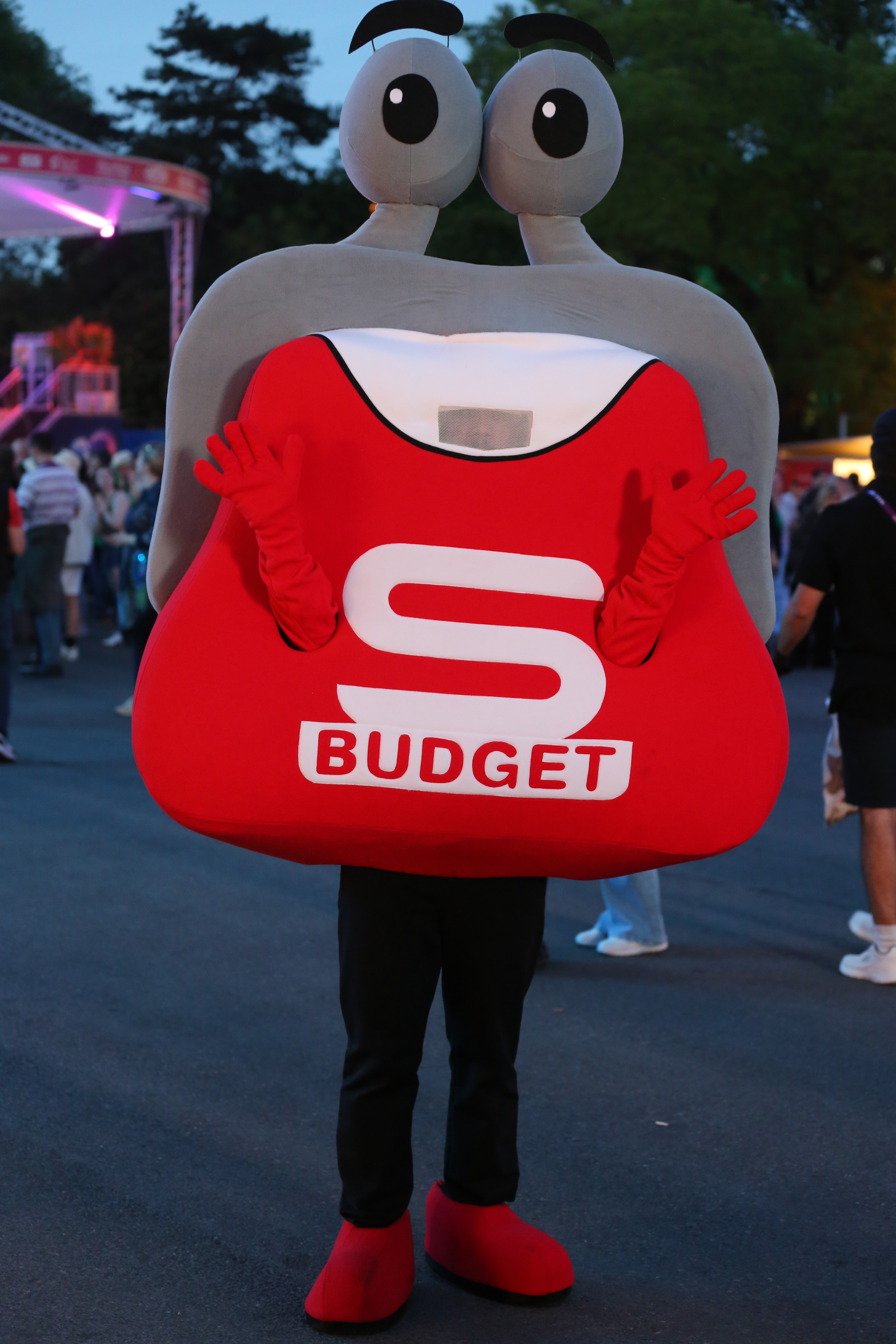
The mascot of SPAR waves in Vienna, Austria

Its headquarters are in Amsterdam. The company operates a partnership programme and has a presence in most European countries, as well as throughout Asia, Africa and Oceania. In fiscal year 2022, SPAR earned €43.5 billion in global sales, which represented a 5.6 percent increase over the previous year. By 2024, the group had 13,900 stores in 48 countries.

== Etymology ==
The name was originally DESPAR, an acronym of the Dutch phrase Door Eendrachtig Samenwerken Profiteren Allen Regelmatig (Note: Dutch pronunciation: [doːr eːnˈdrɑxtəx ˈsaːmə(ɱ)ʋɛrkə(m) proːfiˈteːrə(n) ˈɑlə(n) reːɣəlˈmaːtəx]) 'Through united co-operation everyone profits regularly', which was used by Van Well to describe the brand. The acronym was chosen to resonate with the verb sparen, which (related to English spare) means "save [money]" in Dutch and some other languages, among them German and Scandinavian languages (with variants such as spara or spare). Spar is Dutch for "spruce tree", after which the logo was chosen. As the organisation expanded across Europe, the name was abbreviated by dropping the DE prefix.

Spar in Tbilisi, Georgia, with local name სპარი (sp’ari).

There are some international naming variants:

- In Hungary, 17 stores owned by SPAR located at Orlen (former Lukoil) filling stations operate under the name DESPAR. However, there are also many SPAR and INTERSPAR locations.
- In Italy, the name is still DESPAR, though in keeping with the international branding, the SPAR section of the logo is highlighted, and the larger shops are still called EuroSPAR and InterSPAR.
- In Austria, DESPAR is SPAR's Italian food product range. There are also EUROSPAR and INTERSPAR locations within Austria.
- In Croatia, SPAR and INTERSPAR locations run concurrently.
- In Saudi Arabia, the Latin letters SPAR are displayed next to the Arabic سبار (sbār).
- In China, it is known as 斯巴超市 (Sībā chāoshì, "Siba supermarket").
- In the Republic of Ireland, Northern Ireland, Russia and Switzerland, both the SPAR and EUROSPAR names are used with EUROSPAR being used mostly for larger supermarket sized stores and SPAR for smaller convenience stores.
- In Slovenia, both SPAR and INTERSPAR are used, with INTERSPAR being used for a larger supermarket sized stores and SPAR for smaller convenience stores
- In Georgia, the name is written in Georgian as სპარი (sp’ari).

== History ==
=== 20th century ===
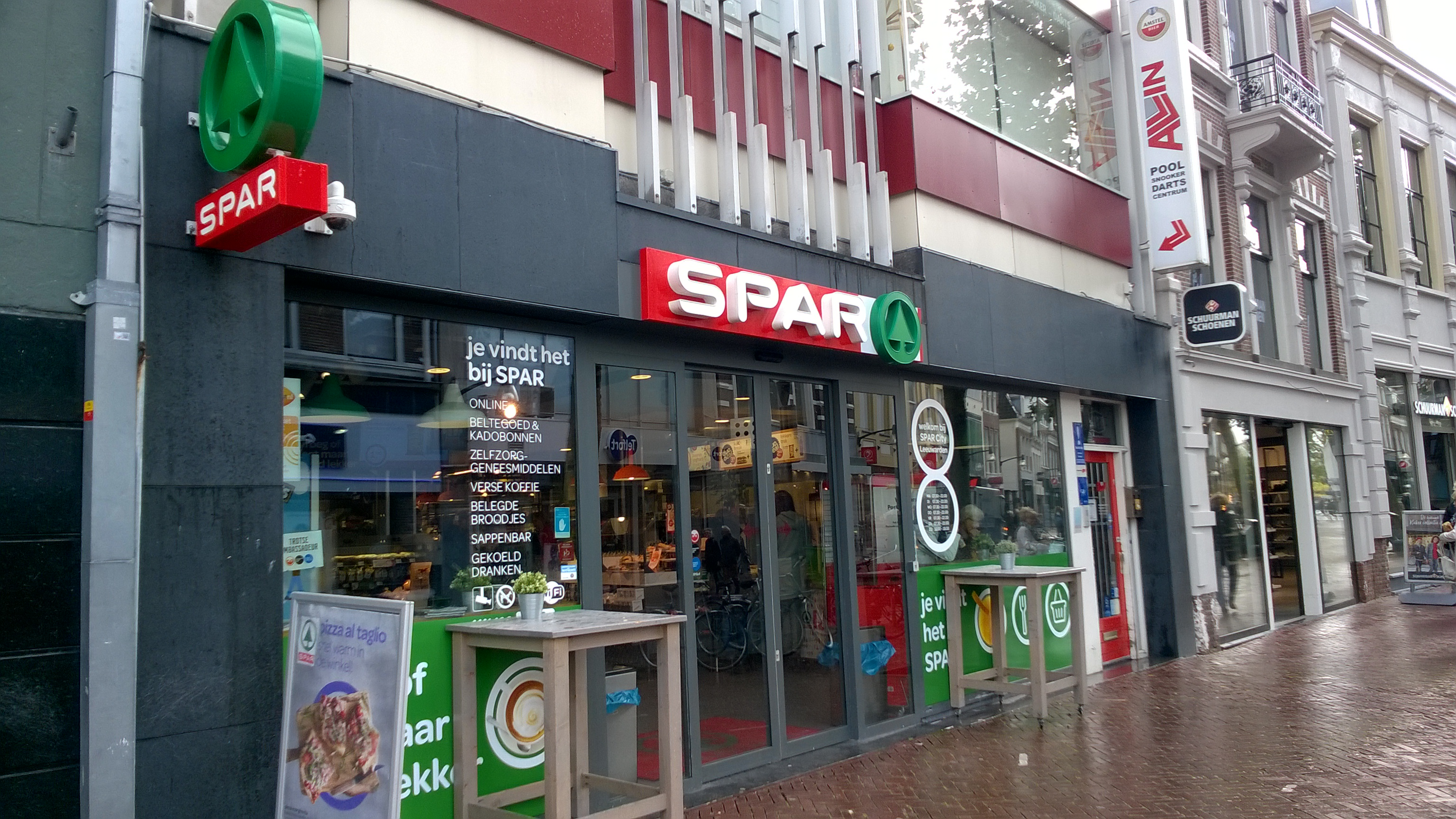
SPAR shop in Leeuwarden, Netherlands

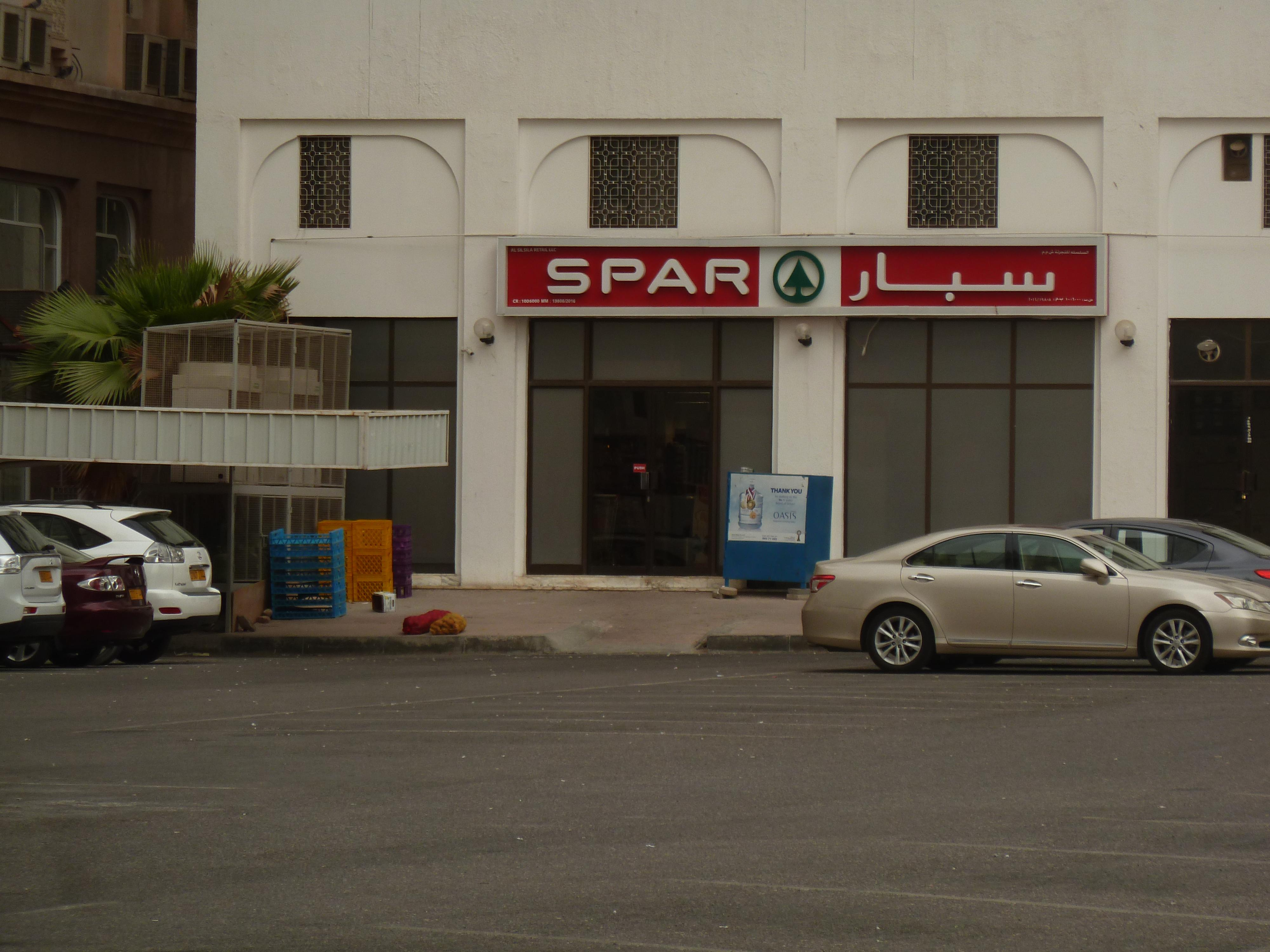
SPAR shop in Muscat, Oman

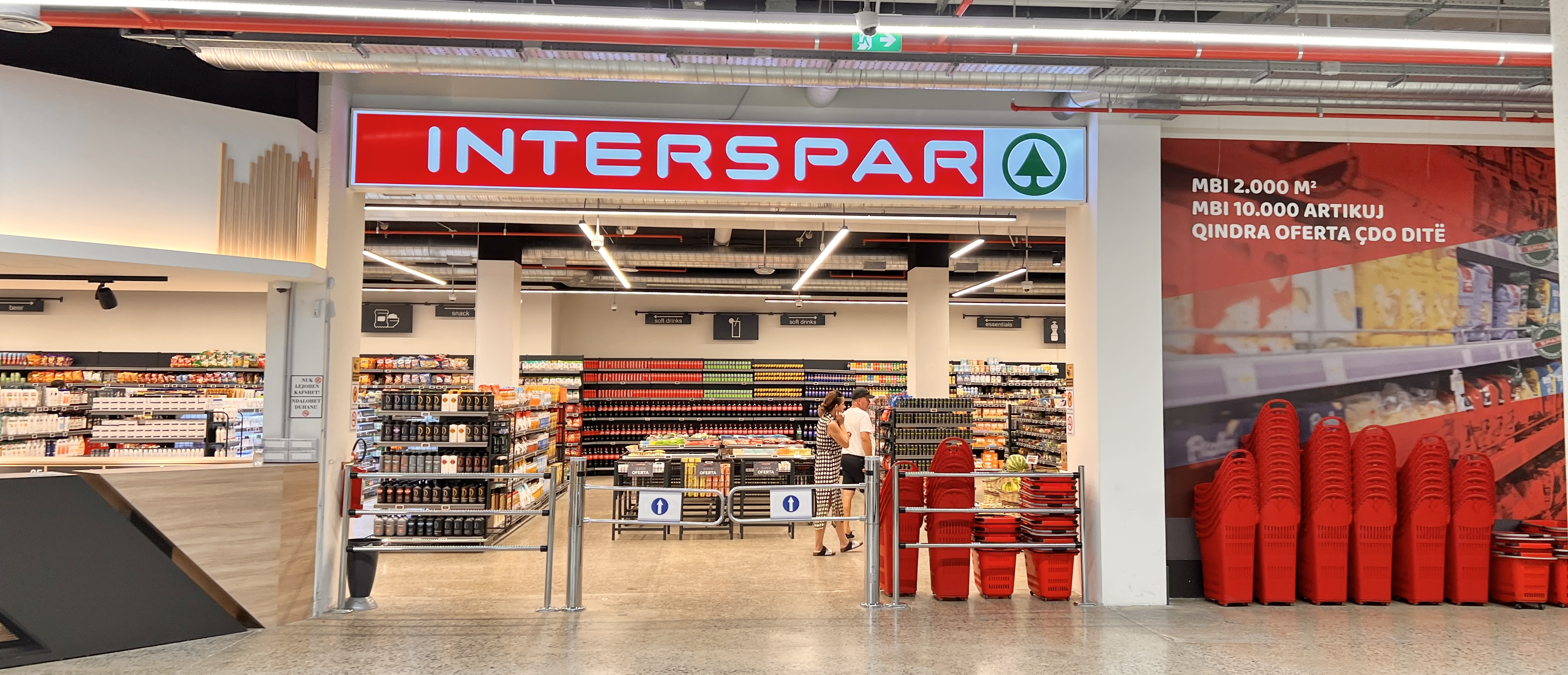
Interspar supermarket in Tirana, Albania.

Spar was founded in 1932 in Zegwaart, Netherlands. In 1953, an International Spar office opened in Amsterdam to manage international expansion. Spar shops can be found in Europe, Australia, Oman, Saudi Arabia, Qatar, United Arab Emirates, Israel, Nigeria, South Africa, Botswana, Namibia, Zimbabwe, Zambia, Mozambique, Seychelles, Sri Lanka, Cameroon, China, and India. Spar opened in Vanuatu on 1 December 2009, ending Au Bon Marché's grocery monopoly.

A Spar shop may be owned independently, by a franchise, or be part of a chain, depending on the model applied in any given country. The owners of the parent company vary from country to country and may include the shop owners themselves. The name and the current logo was most recently revised in 1968 by Raymond Loewy and has since remained unchanged.

In the United Kingdom, Spar was founded in 1959 and may be a supermarket or a convenience shop. In 1997, Spar was introduced to most United Kingdom military bases by the Navy, Army and Air Force Institutes (Naafi), where it sells a variety of civilian and military products. In Ireland and Northern Ireland, the Spar brand is known for neighbourhood shops and also the subformat Eurospar acting as mini-supermarkets.

Since 1996, the company has been a major sponsor of the European Athletic Association and its events. Spar stores in the Netherlands are members of Superunie, an inventory purchasing organisation for a number of otherwise unaffiliated supermarket brands. In 1988, SPAR South Africa became a wholly owned subsidiary of Tiger Brands, a holding company with a large diversified portfolio. It was unbundled and listed as a separate company in 2004.

=== 21st century ===
In July 2014, SPAR South Africa opened its first supermarket in Angola but no expansion of the brand is planned for this market. Since 2021, the group has 100% of BWG Foods, which had outlets in Ireland and southern Britain. In 2015, Ahold acquired all 35 hypermarkets and 14 supermarkets from Spar Czechia for more than 5.2 billion Czech koruna and converted them into Albert super- and hypermarkets. However, it had to divest itself of some shops in order not to have a monopoly. The first SPAR shop in Oman was inaugurated in January 2015, in Muscat. Spar Oman had plans to open more shops over time as part of its expansion plans in Oman. Spar opened its first store in Qatar in 2017, with the second store opening in 2018. A further two stores were planned to open in 2018, but it got cancelled.

SPAR opened in Saudi Arabia in 2017, sublicensed to Al-Sadhan Group opening its first stores in Riyadh. In 2017, Ceylon Biscuits Limited in Sri Lanka acquired a license to operate the Spar brand in Sri Lanka as Spar Lanka. This is a joint venture of Ceylon Biscuits Limited and SPAR South Africa. They opened the first store in Thalawathugoda, Colombo. The plan is to open 50 outlets in the country by 2023. In 2020, there were more than 13,500 SPAR stores in 48 countries. In 2022, SPAR International entered the Kazakhstani retail market.

In 2022, Israeli supermarket chain Shufersal announced plans to open SPAR stores in Israel; with 10 stores to be opened in the first three years of operation. Also in 2022, SPAR entered Latvia where by 2023 it opened 23 stores. A first Israeli Spar store was opened in 2024.

At the beginning of 2025, Tokmanni Oy signed a license agreement with Spar International. The granted license gives Tokmanni the exclusive right to sell Spar products and use the Spar brand in Finland. In June 2025, the first Spar-branded food department was opened in the town of Ylöjärvi. Before that, Spar has had stores in Finland in years 1962–1973 and 1998–2005. In October 2025, the second SPAR store opened in the town of Masku.

In February 2025, Drangar hf signed a license agreement with Spar International. Plan is to change all previous 10–11, Krambúð and Kjörbúð already operated by Samkaup in Iceland to be renamed as SPAR by end of 2027.

== Operations ==
By 2024, the group had 13,900 stores in 48 countries.

- 255 distribution centres
- €41.2 billion total sales
- 410,000 SPAR colleagues
- 7.5 million m^{2} retail sales area
- 14.5 million customers per day

Number of stores per country
Country	Number of stores	Formats
Albania	100	SPAR, SPAR express, INTERSPAR
Angola	38	SPAR, SPAR express
Australia	111	SPAR, SPAR express, SUPERSPAR
Austria	1511	SPAR, SPAR express, SPAR Gourmet, EUROSPAR, INTERSPAR, INTERSPAR Pronto, INTERSPAR Take Away, Despar express
Azerbaijan	53	SPAR, SPAR express, SPAR Market
Belgium	317	SPAR, SPAR express
Botswana	71	SPAR, SUPERSPAR
Cameroon	16	SPAR, SPAR express
China	331	SPAR
Croatia	145	SPAR, INTERSPAR
Denmark	141	SPAR
Eswatini	28	SPAR, KWIKSPAR, SUPERSPAR, SaveMor
Finland	5	EUROSPAR
France	702	SPAR, EUROSPAR
Georgia	382	SPAR, SPAR express
Germany	234	SPAR express
Hungary	652	SPAR, SPAR express, DESPAR, INTERSPAR
Iceland	3	SPAR
India	24	SPAR, SPAR Hypermarket
Ireland	454	SPAR, SPAR express, SPAR Gourmet, EUROSPAR
Italy	1417	DESPAR, DESPAR express, EUROSPAR, INTERSPAR
Kazakhstan	7	SPAR, EUROSPAR
Kosovo	10	SPAR
Kyrgyzstan	7	SPAR
Latvia	24	SPAR, SPAR express
Malta	12	SPAR, SPAR express, EUROSPAR, INTERSPAR
Mozambique	17	SPAR
Monaco	1	SPAR
Namibia	64	SPAR, SPAR express, SUPERSPAR
Netherlands	418	SPAR, SPAR express, SPAR city, SPAR enjoy, SPAR university
Nigeria	14	SPAR
North Macedonia	2	SPAR, INTERSPAR
Norway	284	SPAR, EUROSPAR
Oman	28	SPAR
Pakistan	5	SPAR, SPAR express
Paraguay	1	SPAR
Poland	212	SPAR, SPAR express, EUROSPAR
Portugal	175	SPAR
Qatar	7	SPAR
Russia	203	SPAR, SPAR express, EUROSPAR, EUROSPAR express
Rwanda	1	SPAR
Saudi Arabia	15	SPAR, SPAR express
Seychelles	1	SPAR
Slovenia	162	SPAR, INTERSPAR, DESPAR, SPAR City
South Africa	1094	SPAR, KWIKSPAR, SPAR express, SUPERSPAR, SaveMor
Spain	1435	SPAR, SPAR express, EUROSPAR
Sri Lanka	18	SPAR, SPAR Supermarket
Switzerland	252	SPAR, SPAR express, EUROSPAR
Ukraine	118	SPAR, SPAR express, EUROSPAR
United Arab Emirates	12	SPAR, SPAR express
United Kingdom	2190	SPAR, SPAR express, EUROSPAR (Northern Ireland only)
Zambia	3	SPAR
Zimbabwe	32	SPAR

== Store formats ==
In most, but not all countries, SPAR operates shops of different types and sub-brands including SPAR Express, SPAR, EuroSPAR and InterSPAR.

=== Current store formats ===
==== EuroSPAR ====
The EuroSPAR name is used in Europe for mid-sized supermarkets, designed to fit in a niche between convenience shops and traditional supermarkets.

==== INTERSPAR ====
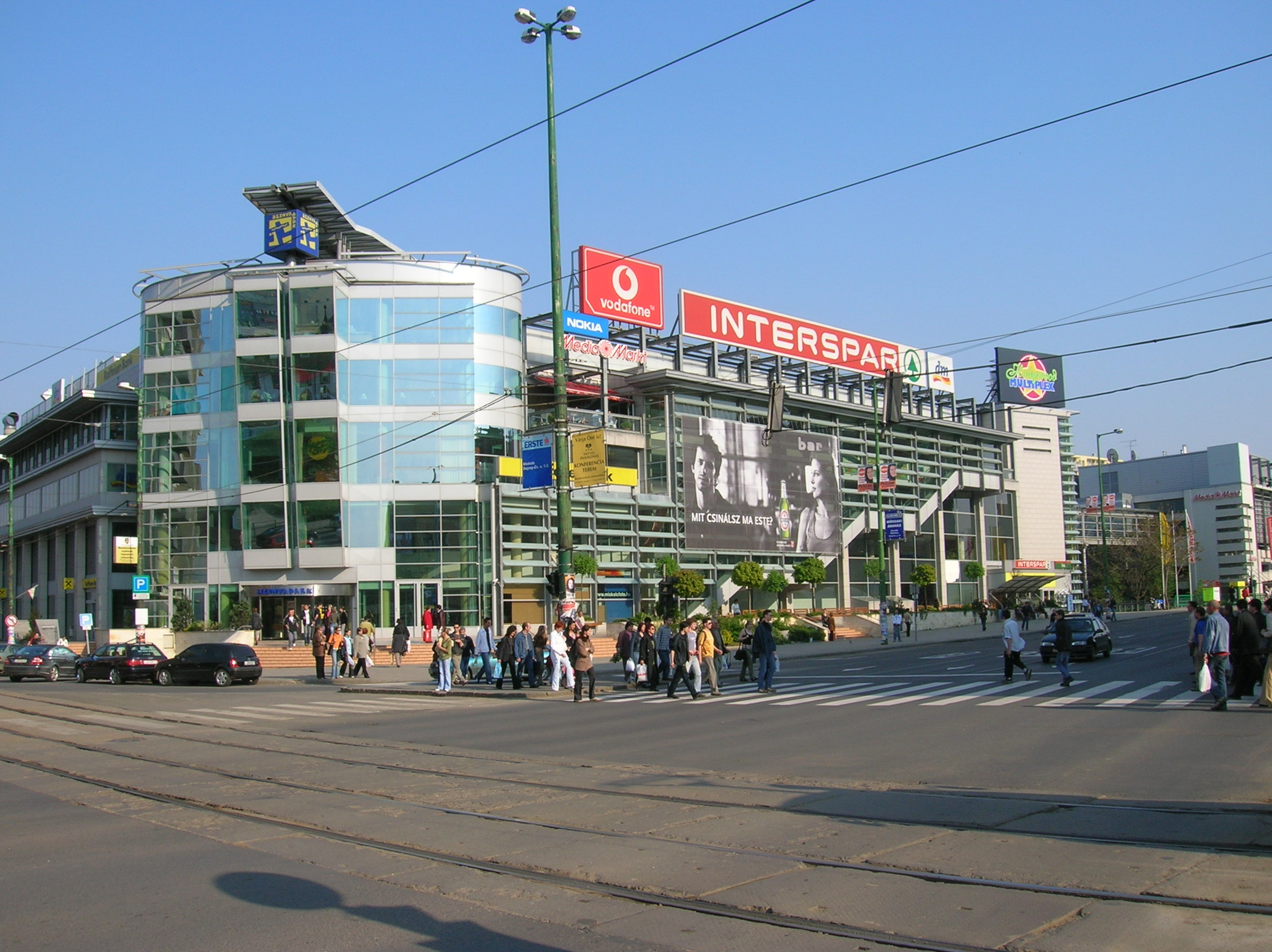
INTERSPAR shop in Miskolc, Hungary

INTERSPAR is an Austrian hypermarket chain founded in 1970 and owned by SPAR Austria, operating large stores ranging from 3,000 to 6,000 m^{2} in Austria, Croatia, Hungary, Slovenia and Italy.

==== KwikSPAR ====
KwikSPAR, only found in Southern Africa, is a smaller quick stop shop for convenience, larger than the conventional SPAR Express and smaller than the normal SPAR. These stores tend to have extended trading hours, some operating as 24-hour convenience stores.

==== SPAR ====
Standard traditional supermarket format.

==== SPAR Express ====
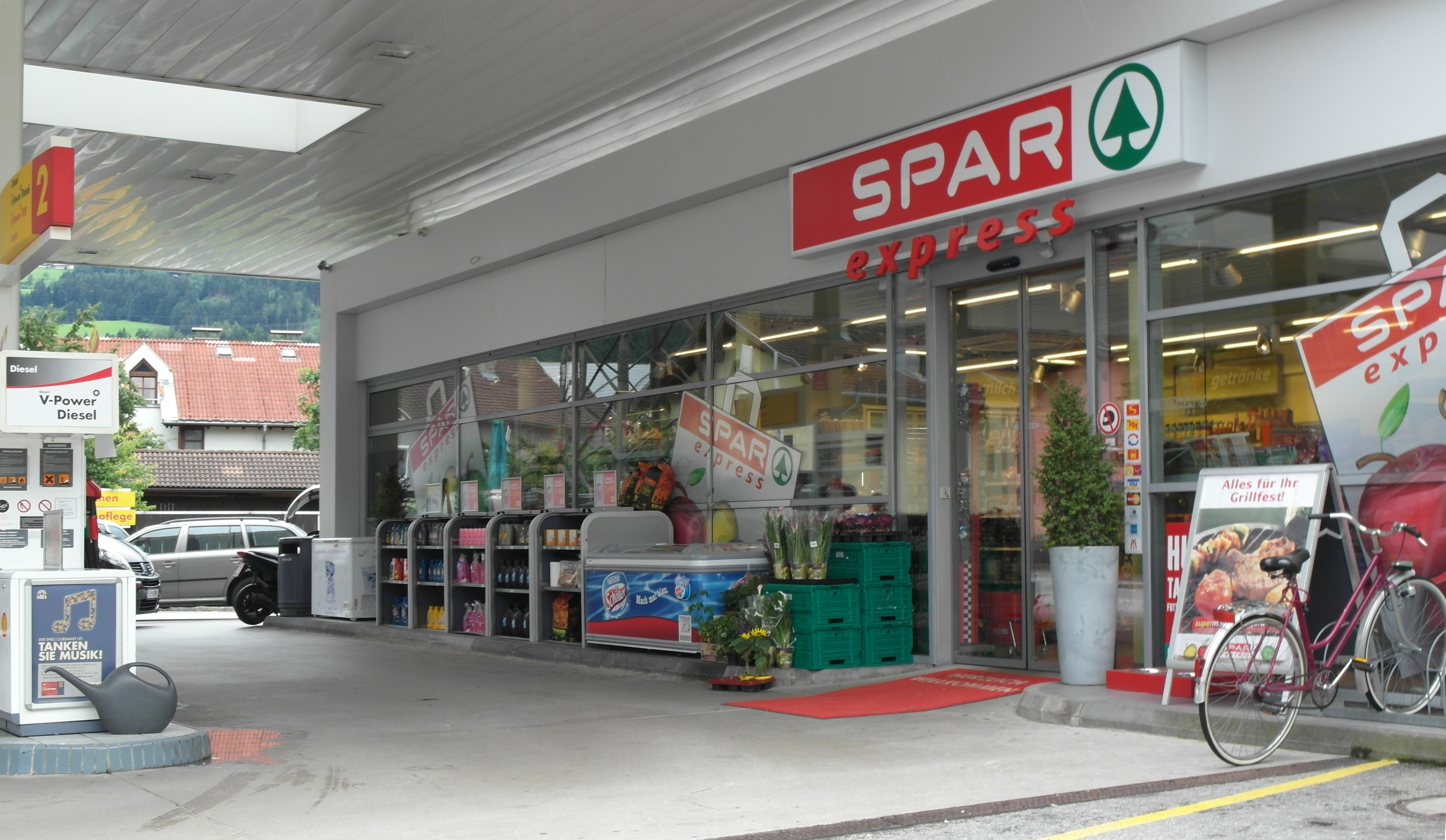
A filling station with a SPAR Express shop in Wattens, Austria

This is the smallest type of shop. They are designed for small sites and filling station forecourts, airports and train stations.

==== SPAR Gourmet ====
The Austrian Spar Group has around 50 supermarkets branded SPAR Gourmet, mainly in and around Vienna. They are smaller supermarkets that specialize in foods, with a reduced range of other household goods. They originate from the acquisition of retail units from the Julius Meinl coffee and tea chain in 2000.

==== SUPERSPAR ====
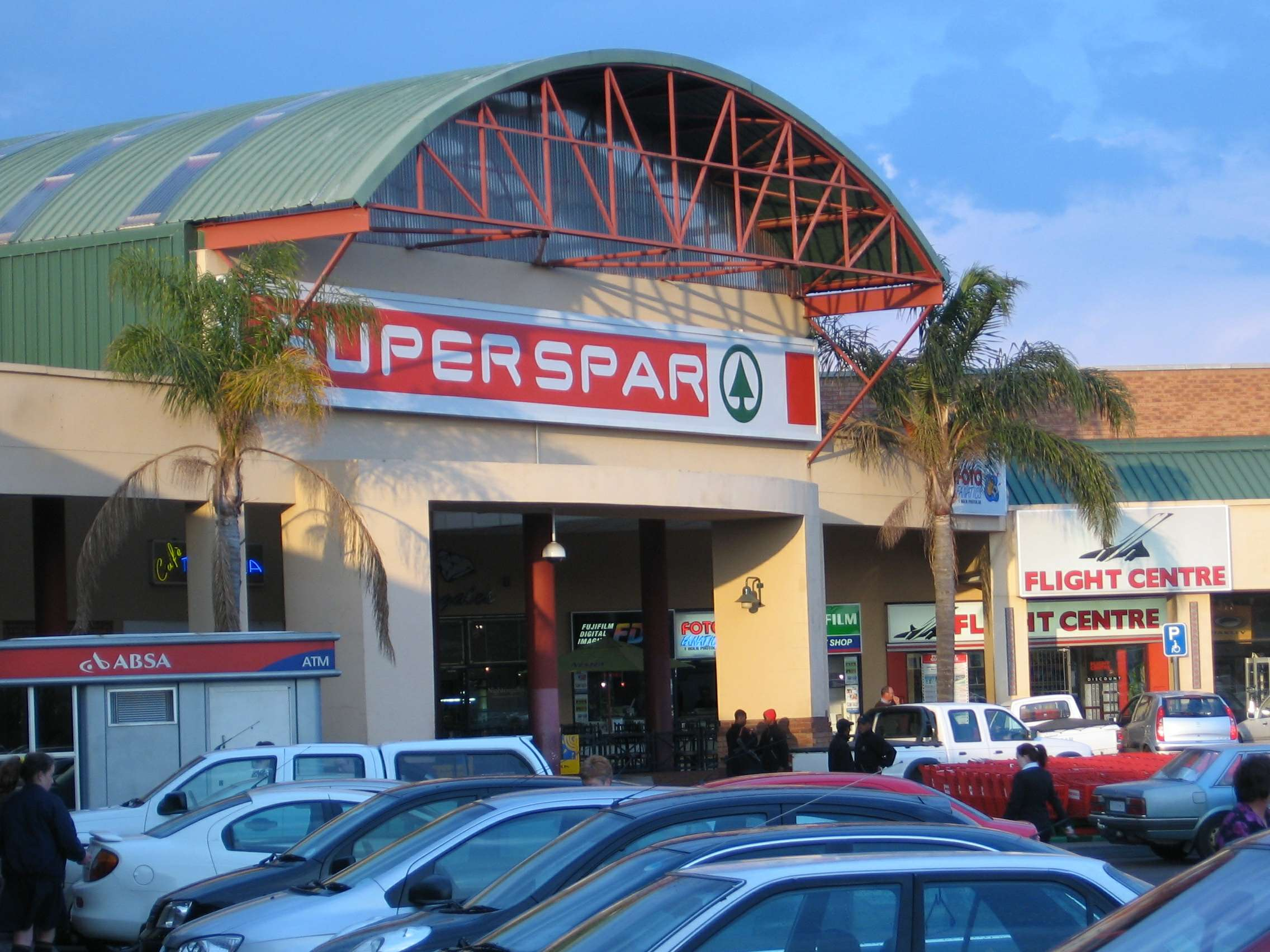
SUPERSPAR in Johannesburg, South Africa.

The SUPERSPAR name is used in Australia, designed to fit in a niche between convenience shops and traditional supermarkets. In South Africa, Botswana and Namibia, the name is used for large supermarkets.

=== Defunct store formats ===
==== HOT SPAR ====
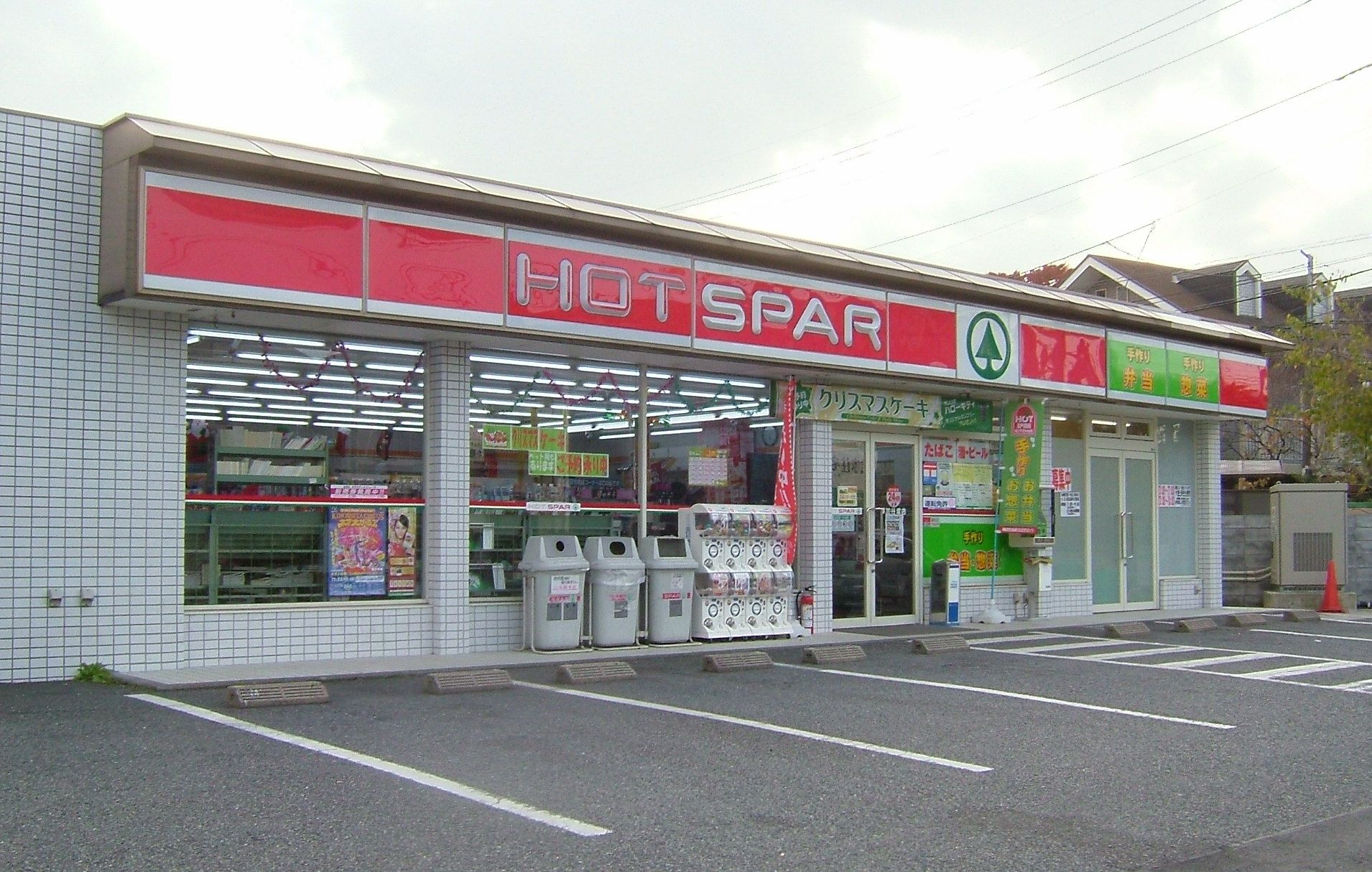
Former HOT SPAR shop in Sōka, Japan

HOT SPAR was a brand of convenience stores licensed to franchisees in Japan. In 2007, the chain would be acquired by, and rebranded to Cocostore following the expiry of its parent company’s operating license.

==== SPAR Drive-Thru ====
There was a drive-through SPAR on the Cliftonville Road in Belfast, Northern Ireland. This has now been converted to a Centra shop, and retained the drive-through for a while afterwards, but now no longer has one.

== See also ==
- List of convenience stores
