= Seghwaert =

- District of Zoetermeer
- Coat of arms

- Coordinates: 52.065°N 4.510°E
- Country: Netherlands
- Province: South Holland
- Municipality: Zoetermeer

Area
  - Total: 219 ha (540 acres)

Population (January 1, 2007)
  - Total: 17,160
  - Density: 7,840/km^{2} (20,300/sq mi)
- Time zone: UTC+1 (CET)
  - Summer (DST): UTC+2 (CEST)
- Website: Seghwaert

Seghwaert is a district in Zoetermeer that was formed around the old village of Zegwaart (or Zegwaard), which fused with the municipality of Zoetermeer in 1935, using the archaic spelling of the locale's name. The old Zegwaart was a ribbon development along what remains until today as Zegwaartseweg, which is perpendicular to Dorpstraat. The district is divided into Seghwaert-Oost (2723), -Midden (2724) and -Noord (2727).

In the Middle Ages Zegwaart and Zoetermeer formed a parish. The coat of arms of the municipality was of azure, with three slanting bars of silver.

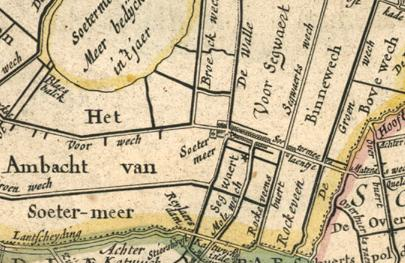
Segwaert (1665)

== Notable people from Seghwaert ==
- Jan van Leeuwen (1850-1924), Professor of Greek language and literature at Leiden
- Silvia de Groot (1918-2009), cultural anthropologist / surinamist
