= Zoetermeer =

- City and municipality
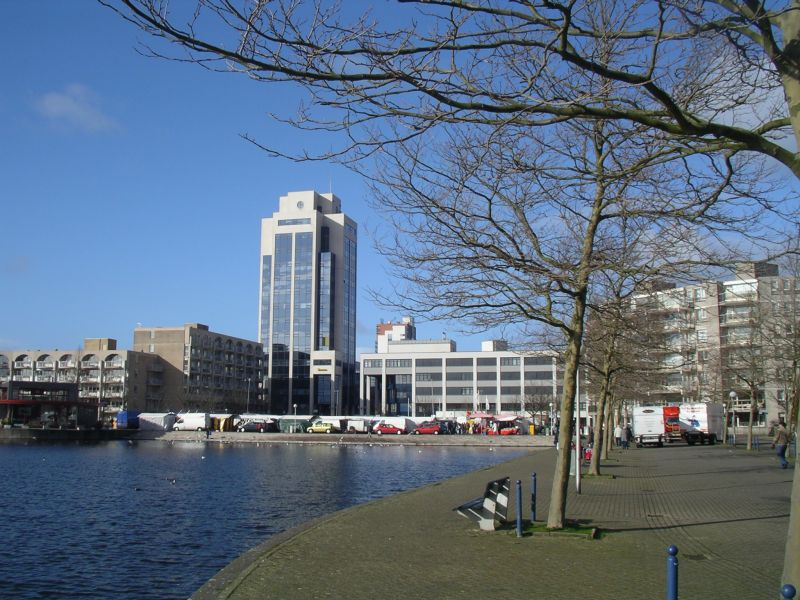
- Buildings in Zoetermeer

- Flag Coat of arms

- Location in South Holland

- Location within the Netherlands Location within Europe
- Coordinates: 52°4′N 4°30′E
- Country: Netherlands
- Province: South Holland

Government
  - Body: Municipal council
  - Mayor: Michel Bezuijen (VVD)

Area
  - Total: 37.05 km^{2} (14.31 sq mi)
  - Land: 34.45 km^{2} (13.30 sq mi)
  - Water: 2.60 km^{2} (1.00 sq mi)
- Elevation: −3 m (−9.8 ft)

Population (January 2021)
  - Total: 125,267
  - Density: 3,636/km^{2} (9,420/sq mi)
- Demonym: Zoetermeerder
- Time zone: UTC+1 (CET)
  - Summer (DST): UTC+2 (CEST)
- Postcode: 2700–2729
- Area code: 079
- Website: www.zoetermeer.nl

Zoetermeer (Dutch pronunciation: [ˌzutərˈmeːr]) is a city in the Western Netherlands, in the province of South Holland. The municipality covers an area of 37.05 km^{2} (14.31 sq mi) of which 2.60 km^{2} (1.00 sq mi) is water. A small village until the late 1960s, it had 6,392 inhabitants in 1950. By 2023 this had grown to 126,998, making it the fourth largest population centre in the province of South Holland, after Rotterdam, The Hague and Leiden. While now a city in its own right, Zoetermeer started out as a suburb of The Hague and is still a part of the Greater The Hague urban area.

The name Zoetermeer (Dutch for "freshwater lake") refers to the former lake north of the town (reclaimed in 1614). Because the name literally translates as "sweet lake" local residents have dubbed Zoetermeer "Sweet Lake City".

== History ==
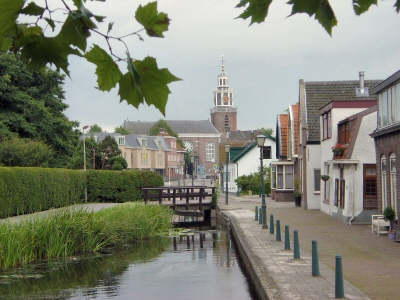
A street in the old town centre

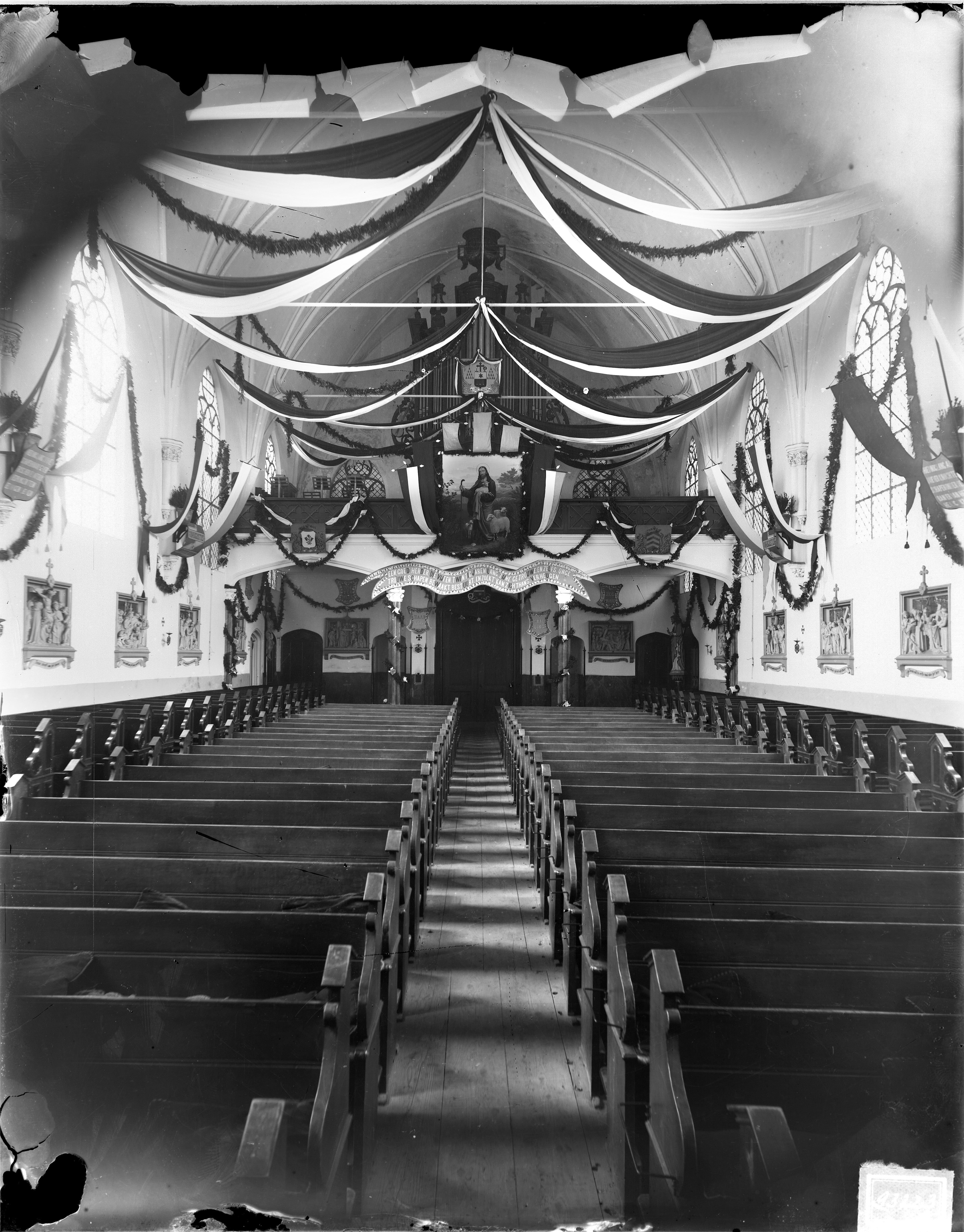
Interior of the Nicolaaskerk in Zoetermeer, 1869

The Zoetermeer Archaeological Working Group has found some Roman shards, but they are so few that it is not clear whether Zoetermeer already existed in Roman times. Excavation did find older animal material. During the extraction of sand for the new housing estates, bones of mammoths, aurochs and saber-toothed tigers surfaced from great depths. Those animals walked around here ten to a hundred thousand years ago.

The village of Zoetermeer is more than a thousand years old. In the Middle Ages, farmers dug so-called valley holes. The clay from those holes was used to improve their peatland. At the bottom of one such hole, Zoetermeer archaeologists found a carved wooden pole a few years ago, dating back to the year 985.

Zoetermeer used to have to pay a certain tax, the botting, to the Count of Holland. It is known that only the oldest towns in this province paid that tax. This shows that Zoetermeer must have been founded at least before 1100. The first written evidence for the existence of a village on the site of present-day Zoetermeer is found in 1269. Count Floris V then gave away part of the tax revenue here as a dowry.

In the 13th century a village center was formed, which still exists as the historic Dorpsstraat. Until the 17th century there was a lake called the Zoetermeer. A reminder of this is the "Zoetermeerse Plas" in the Noord Aa recreation area at the northern edge of town; this artificial lake was created when tons of sand were needed to lay the foundation for new housing development, and the area north of Zoetermeer was a good source of this resource.

After the foundation of Zoetermeer, the settlement Zegwaart arose at the site of the present Zegwaartseweg. It was probably named after the sedge-covered worth, a low-lying area, where most people went to live. In the 13th century the settlement centers moved from Langeland and Zegwaartseweg to Dorpsstraat. In 1296 there was probably already a church on the site where the Oude Kerk now stands. Zoetermeer and Zegwaart remained independent, but formed one parish.

Zoetermeer developed more prosperously over the centuries than Zegwaart. That village suffered relatively often from fires and floods. On May 1, 1935, both municipalities were merged into the present municipality of Zoetermeer. Seghwaert, an older way of spelling of Zegwaard, is now the name of a neighbourhood outside the old village centre.

Newsreel from 1973 about the 'fastest growing municipality of our country'

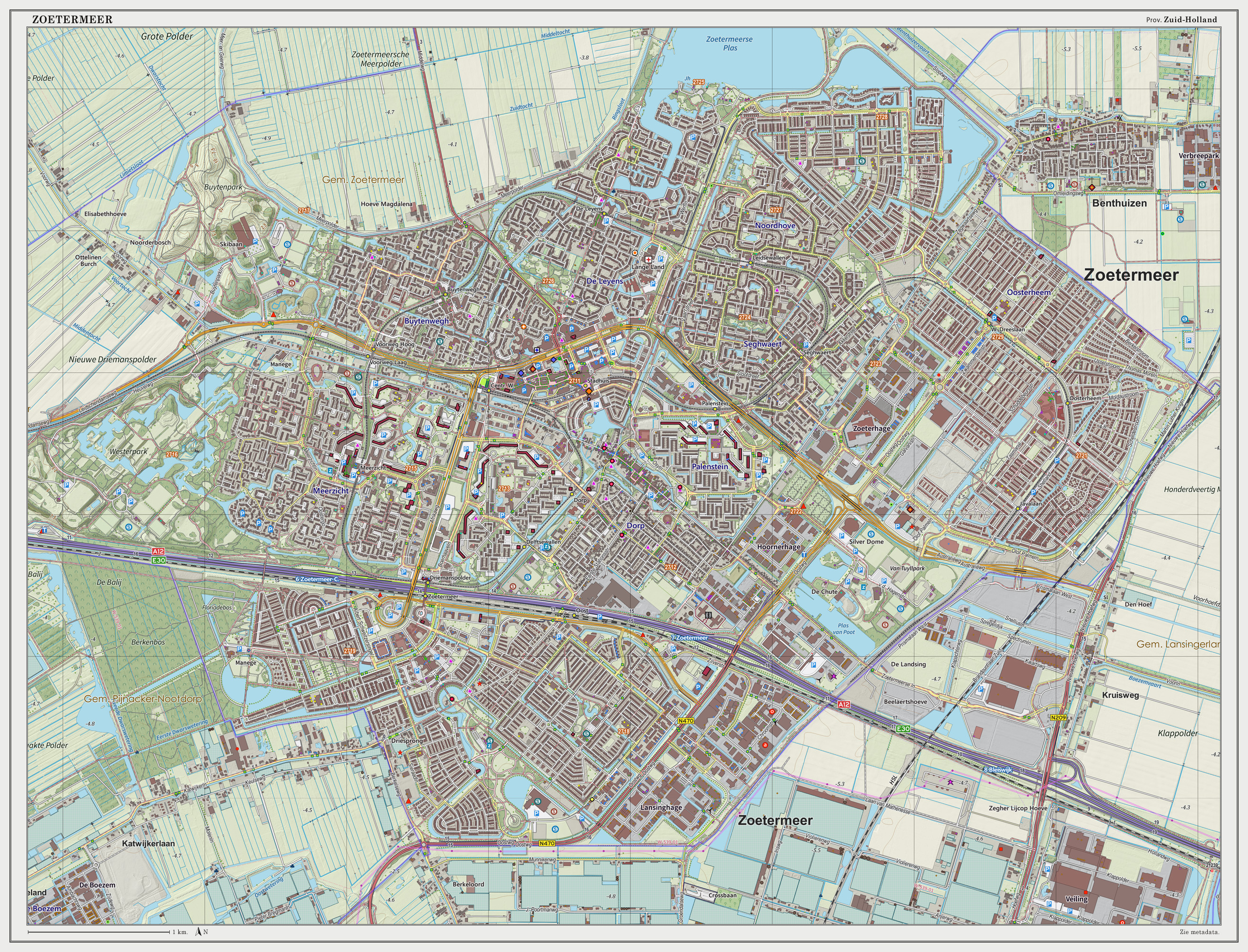
Topographic map of Zoetermeer, 2014

Zoetermeer began to grow slightly when the first train service came around 1868. A few decades later the Numico factory started near the station. The real growth started in 1966, when there was an urgent need of houses from people around The Hague. From then they started to build new quarters around the old village centre, so Zoetermeer began to grow and became a city in the meantime.

Although contemporary Zoetermeer has the image of a modern city, there are still remains of the past. Like the old village centre with its small houses and the church with late medieval 15th-century clock tower (on picture, wooden top from 1642), and the old farms, surrounded by modern houses nowadays.

Lake Dobbe divides the old town from the new city centre, with the medieval village centre on one side of the lake and the modern high-rise and skyscrapers on the other side.

== Neighbourhoods ==
Zoetermeer is divided into 6 neighbourhoods (wijken), which cover most of the municipality's territory, with the remainder being the commercial area in the east and the mostly green and undeveloped Buitengebied in the west. Every neighbourhood has at least one (smaller) shopping mall and (except for Noordhove) a tram stop. Each neighbourhood consists of one or more wijken, each of which has a separate postcode with differing last two digits following "27", from within Zoetermeer's 2710-2729 assigned postcodes (2700, 2701 and 2702 are used for post-office boxes and the rest are not used as of 2012)

These neighbourhoods have the following names (in brackets the year the neighbourhood was designated, although some of the neighbourhood already existed before designation):

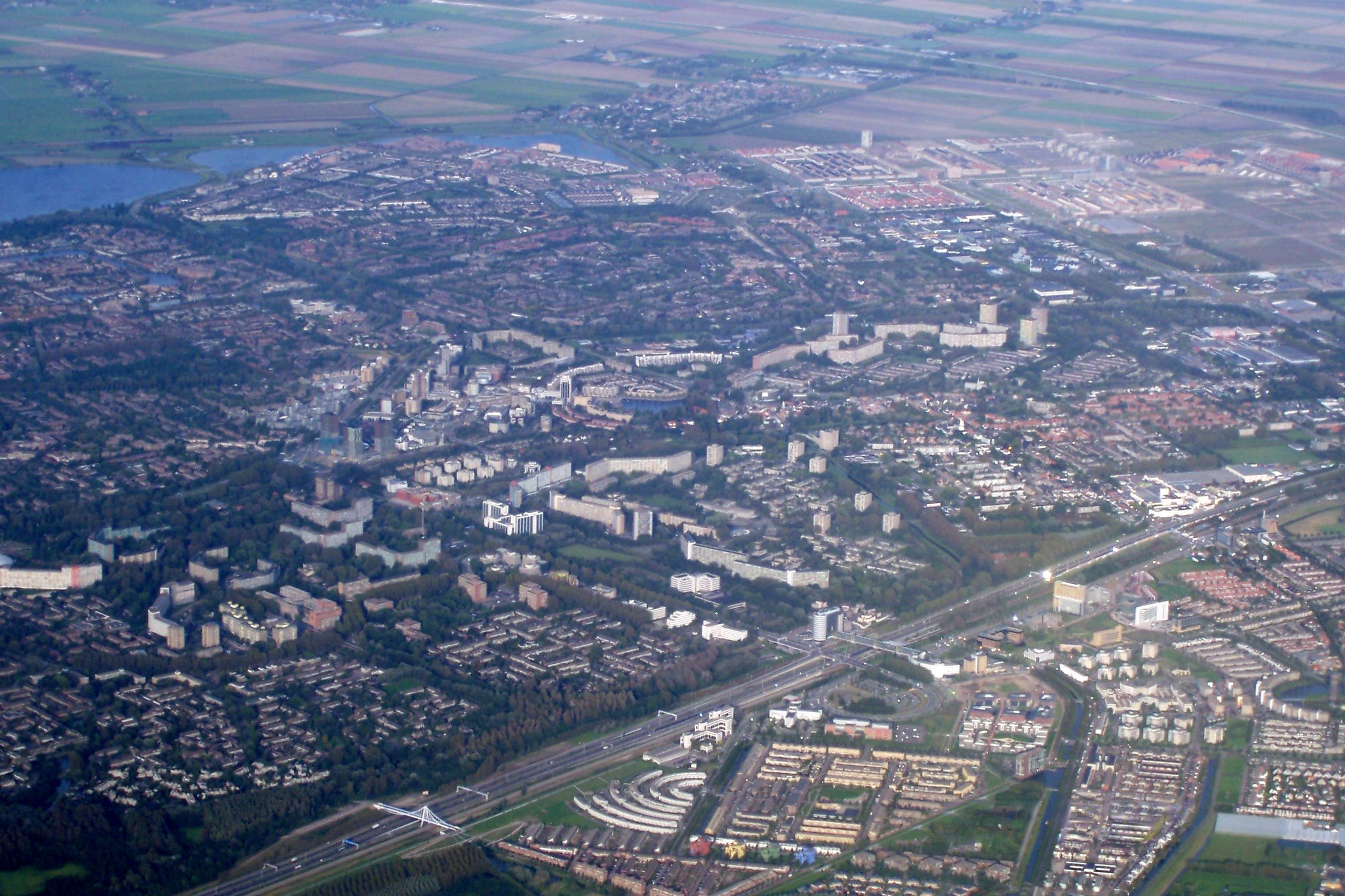
Aerial view of Zoetermeer.

=== Meerzicht (1969) ===
Literally meaning "lake view", Meerzicht is divided by the RandstadRail light rail tracks into Meerzicht-Oost (postcode 2715), with taller block of flats, and Meerzicht-West (postcode 2716) with low-rise residential development. Further to the west is the water-rich, 280-hectare urban park and recreation area Westerpark.

=== Buytenwegh de Leyens (1974) ===
The development of this area marked the shift to the development of single-family homes with private gardens more popular with Dutch families of that and coming decades, and encompasses the much older settlements of Buytenwegh (postcode 2717) and De Leyens (postcode 2725), and an area called "Buytenwegh de Leyens" per se (postcode 2726).

=== Centrum (1978) ===
The construction of a new centre of Zoetermeer actually started only in 1981, to serve as a shopping and administrative heart of the city. It followed modern urban planning principles, placing parking garages, some storage facilities and a RandstadRail station on the ground level, which is covered by pedestrian- and bicycle-only area with shops on the lower floors and apartments above them, to ensure the centre does not die out outside of the business hours.

The centre was completed in phases, the last one being the Cadenza residential development in 2017. The Stadscentrum has two RandstadRail stations. The Centrum-West station is the terminus of RandstadRail line 3 and is the location of Zoetermeer's busiest bus station. The Stadscentrum includes the modern town hall of Zoetermeer and the local police station. A small lake called Grote Dobbe is placed directly in between Stadscentrum and Dorp, with the promenades and bicycle paths along the lake connecting the old and the new centres of Zoetermeer. The postcode for Stadscentrum is 2711.

=== Noordhove & Seghwaert (1986) ===
Noordhove (postcode 2728) is located between Seghwaert to the south and the artificial lake known as 'Zoetermeerse Plas' to the north. Unlike the other wijken, it has no dedicated RandstadRail station, as both RandstadRail track branches run to the south of it.

=== Rokkeveen (1987) ===
Rokkeveen is separated from the other wijken by the A12 motorway and the Den Haag-Gouda railway line. As such, it enjoys direct access to Zoetermeer's railway stations and features numerous crossings under or over both transport corridors to allow access to the rest of Zoetermeer. Rokkeveen is further divided into Rokkeveen-Oost and Rokkeveen-West. A significant turning point in the development of this part of town was the Floriade 1992, which took place there.

Rokkeveen-Oost (postcode 2718) extends between the railway stations Zoetermeer-Oost and Zoetermeer. The Mandelabrug (Nelson Mandela bridge) was built over the latter for the Floriade (replacing an earlier smaller bridge, deemed insufficient for the increased traffic) as a covered bicycle and pedestrian passage over the railway, motorway and the RandstadRail, which adjoins it at this point from the North. The Mandelabrug connects the train station, the Randstadrail station Driemanspolder and the wijken of Rokkeveen-Oost and Driemanspolder. Next to the Mandelabrug runs a road crossing - a bridge between Afrikaweg on the northern side and Zuidweg in Rokkeveen.

The other crossing are the road, pedestrian and bicycle tunnels between Tweede and Eerste Stationsstraat next to Zoetermeer-Oost train station, connecting Rokkeveen-Oost with Dorp. The historic water tower De Tien Gemeenten is also now located in Rokkeveen-Oost.

Rokkeveen-West (postcode 2719) mainly encompasses newer development on the grounds of the former Floriade-park, which includes both residential and office buildings.

=== Oosterheem (1999) ===
Oosterheem is the newest district of Zoetermeer, a Vinex-location and the source of Zoetermeer's most recent and continuing growth, which allowed it to become the third most populous municipality in South Holland. The districts development was not without problematic issues and delays, stemming first from the concerns over the environmental impacts of such development, and later from the planning and construction of HSL-Zuid, which now forms the district's and municipality's eastern border. An enduring concern is an old pipeline, now used for the transportation of pressurized CO_{2}, which runs through Oosterheem.

Oosterheem is served by three stations on RandstadRail line 4, whose tracks branch out from the original RandstadRail loop in Seghwaert. It is further divided into Oosterheem-Oost (postcode 2721) and Oosterheem-West (postcode 2729).

=== Wijkposten ===
Zoetermeer has a network of "wijkposten" ("neighbourhood stations"), which provide more direct contacts between the municipality and the inhabitants of the neighbourhoods. The wijkposten employ personnel to deal with housing issues and provide space for local police officers. There are six wijkposten throughout Zoetermeer. Buytenwegh de Leyens, Meerzicht, Oosterheem and Rokkeveen have a wijkpost each, while Noordhove and Seghwaert share a common station and Wijkpost Center serves Dorp, Driemanspolder, Palenstein and Stadscentrum, which are for some purposes also lumped together as "Zoetermeer Centrum".

=== Other former neighbourhoods ===
==== Dorp (1962) ====
Literally meaning "village", this wijk covers mostly the territory of the pre-existing village of Zoetermeer, with the central Dorpstraat (village street) with historic buildings serving as a shopping and recreation area. The area also features the historic De Hoop windmill, which unlike many other windmills in the area used for drainage, has always been used as a flourmill. The postcode for Zoetermeer-Dorp is 2712.

==== Driemanspolder (1965) ====
Driemanspolder (postcode 2713) was the first area to be developed as part of modern Zoetermeer, and contains mostly large multi-apartment buildings characteristic of the era. It is next to the A12 motorway, which forms the southern border of the wijk, and directly north of the Zoetermeer railway station (which is on the other side of A12).

==== Palenstein (1966) ====
Palenstein (postcode 2722) is north of the Dorp, deriving its name from the former Castle of Palenstein, which used to be there. It mainly consists of highrise residential development. A rejuvenation project was started in Palenstein in 2006, providing for the renovation of some and demolition of other older buildings.

==== Seghwaert (1975) ====
Seghwaert was formed around what was the former village of Zegwaart (or Zegwaard), which fused with Zoetermeer in 1935, using the archaic spelling of the locale's name. The old Zegwaart was a ribbon development along what remains until today as Zegwaartseweg, which is perpendicular to Dorpstraat. It is further divided into Seghwaert-Oost (postcode 2723), -Midden (postcode 2724) and -Noord (postcode 2727).

== Economy ==
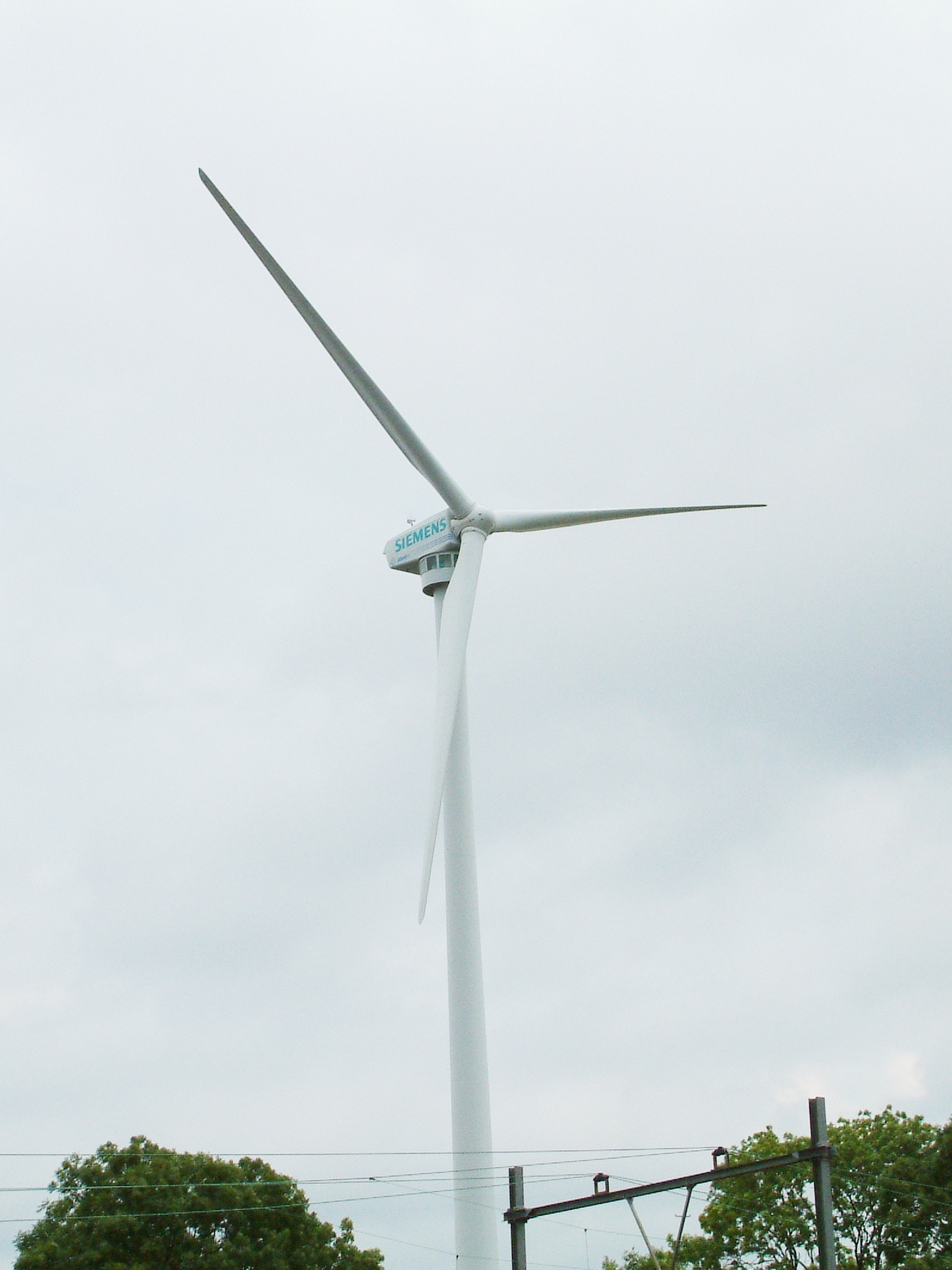
former wind turbine with observation deck at Siemens factory in Zoetermeer

Zoetermeer's economy is primarily dependent and revolving around Information technology. With modern infrastructure, a highly digitised centre called 'het Forum' that houses city hall, the central library and numerous other organisations, and many schools that offer IT-related education, it also is a major software development centre, with many software developers based here. There are a large number of IT companies with branches in Zoetermeer, like Siemens, which has its Dutch Tech Campus in Zoetermeer, and Toshiba Medical Systems Europe BV. 20% of the population of Zoetermeer has an IT-related job. The local government designates a comparatively large part of the budget to computers for schools.

To stress the IT tradition of Zoetermeer, the city is the first in the world to have a city hall in Second Life.

== Transport ==
=== Light rail ===
The former Zoetermeer Stadslijn urban railway was rebuilt as light rail in 2006/2007. The stadslijn was the only urban railway in The Netherlands. It had 12 stations in Zoetermeer and ran to and from The Hague Central Station.

The new light rail system is part of the RandstadRail network between The Hague, Rotterdam and Zoetermeer. Besides the rebuilt original Stadslijn, which now has 13 stations, the added Oosterheemlijn leads to the new suburb Oosterheem. The Oosterheemlijn has five stations and ends at the heavy rail Station Lansingerland-Zoetermeer.

=== Heavy rail ===
Zoetermeer has three stations on the main railway between The Hague and Utrecht. Zoetermeer-Zegwaard, built when the city was connected by railway in 1868, burnt down in 1906. Later the station reopened 1965 on the same location as Zoetermeer-Oost. The main station, Zoetermeer station, was opened in 1973. Lastly, the newest station, Station Lansingerland-Zoetermeer, was completed in May 2019.

The HSL-Zuid high speed line from Amsterdam to Paris passes Zoetermeer on its eastern side. Although there have been proposals to open a station on the line, this seems highly unlikely to be realized.

=== Motorway ===
Zoetermeer is next to the A12 motorway, connecting The Hague with Utrecht, Arnhem and Germany.

== Religion ==
Zoetermeer is the only place in the Netherlands with a temple of the Church of Jesus Christ of Latter-day Saints. It is situated near the old village centre.

== Entertainment and recreation ==
This former new town used to be a satellite city of The Hague, as many residents worked, shopped and were entertained in The Hague. With the growth of Zoetermeer came a large theatre, mega cinema, and other entertainment such as go-karts, laser gaming, survival centre, and a golf centre.

=== Museums ===
The city has two museums, Museum deVoorde and the National Videogame Museum. In 2022, subsidy for Museum deVoorde was stopped by the local government because of low visitor numbers after the COVID-19 pandemic.

=== SnowWorld ===
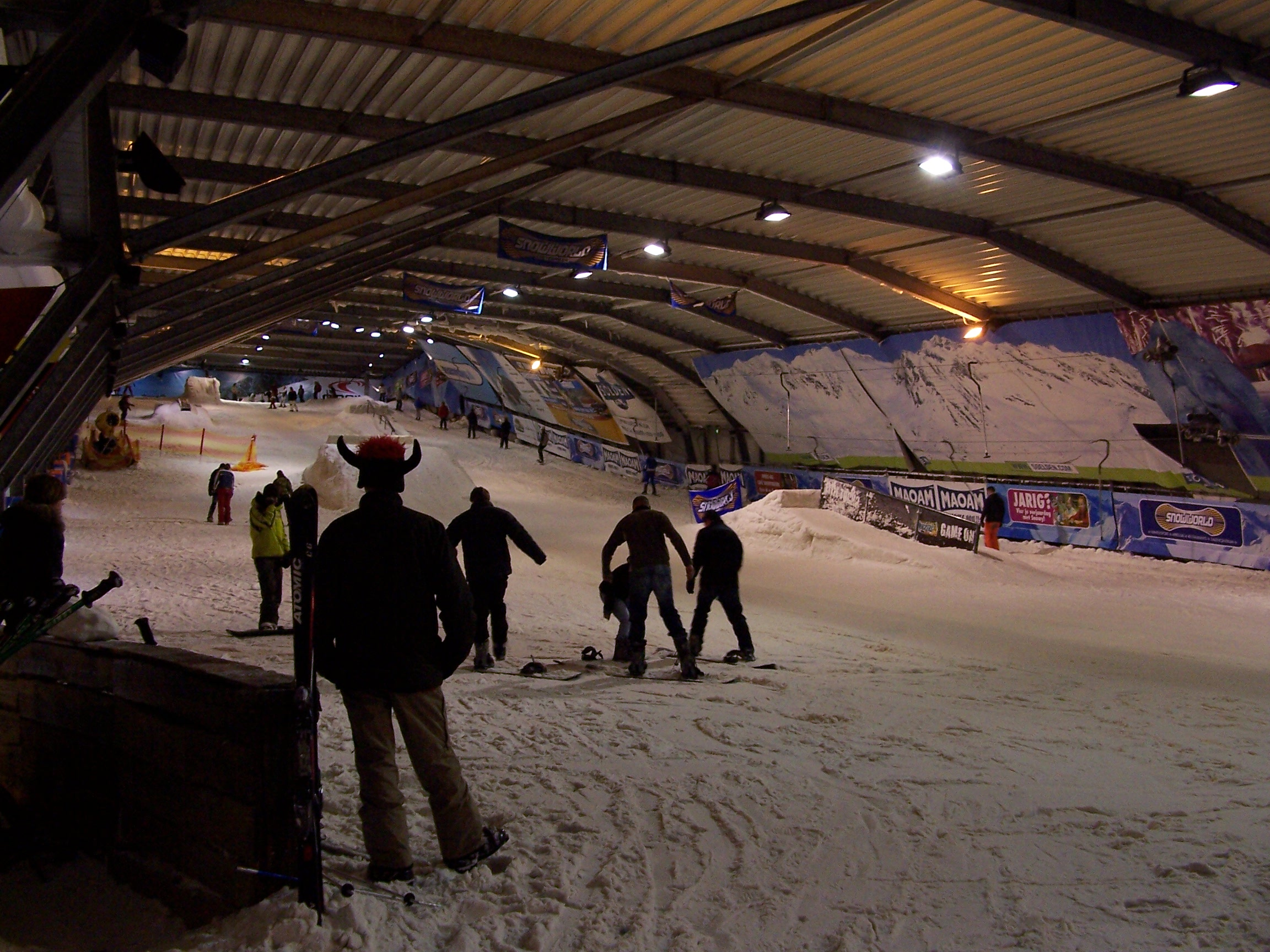
SnowWorld indoor ski slope

SnowWorld was the first indoor ski slope made of real snow in Europe, opened in 1996. It now has three slopes, of which the 300-metre (980-foot) slope is the longest. Open since December 2016, SnowWorld attracts over a million visitors each year, making it the most important tourist attraction in Zoetermeer.

=== Dutch Water Dreams ===
Dutch Water Dreams (DWD) was an artificial Olympic wild water rafting circuit. It was a copy of the one built in China for the 2008 Olympic Games and was mainly used for training by European rafting teams, and also for team building and recreation. DWD also had an indoor Flowrider centre. Dutch Water Dreams closed in 2015.

=== Silverdome ===
Silverdome is an indoor ice skating track and convention centre. It is also home to the only curling rink in the Netherlands. Outside the skating season it is used as a convention centre and concert hall and for large raves.

=== Parks ===
Zoetermeer has many parks, the biggest being the "Westerpark" on the west side of town. It is almost as large as Central Park in New York. Other notable parks are the "Buytenpark", the "Aldo van Eyckpark", the "Binnenpark", the "Van Tuyllpark (with Dutch Water Dreams and Aquapark Keerpunt), the "Hoekstrapark", the "Wilhelminapark", the "floriade park", the "Seghwaertse Hout" and the "Seghwaertpark".

At the north side there is a lake, the "Zoetermeerse Plas", often called "Noord Aa" because it is in the Noord Aa Recreational Area. There is a beach along one side of the lake and a marina on the other. Wind- and kite surfing, sailing and fishing are the most popular activities on the lake.

On both the west and east side of the city forests are being planted, called "Balijbos" (west side) and Bentwoud (east side). These forests are intended to form a "natural" barrier between The Hague and Zoetermeer.

== International relations ==
=== Twin towns – Sister cities ===
Zoetermeer is twinned with:

Hamm, Germany; Jinotega, Nicaragua	Nitra, Slovakia; Odorheiu Secuiesc, Romania	Xiamen, China

== Notable people ==
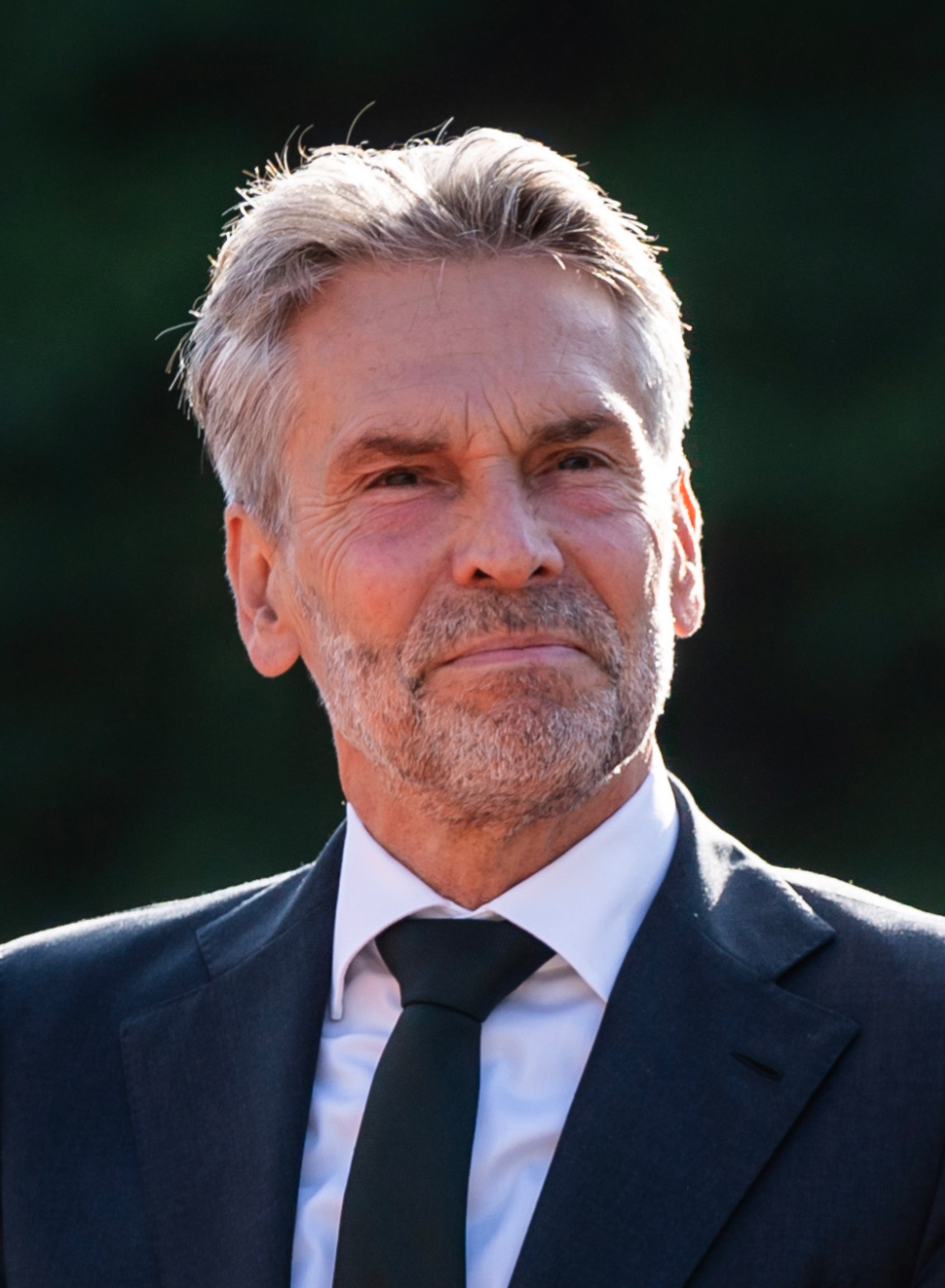
Dick Schoof, 2025

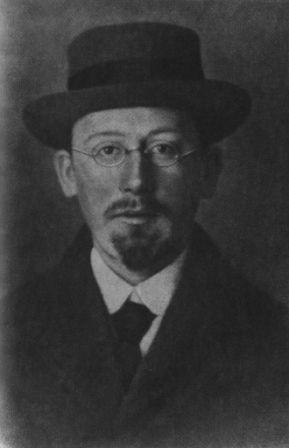
Antonius van den Broek, 1903

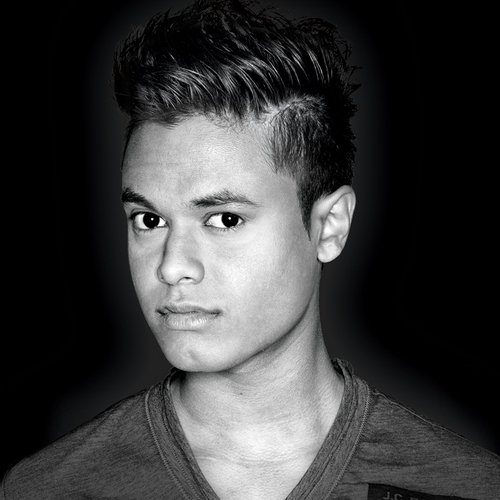
Sandro Silva, 2014

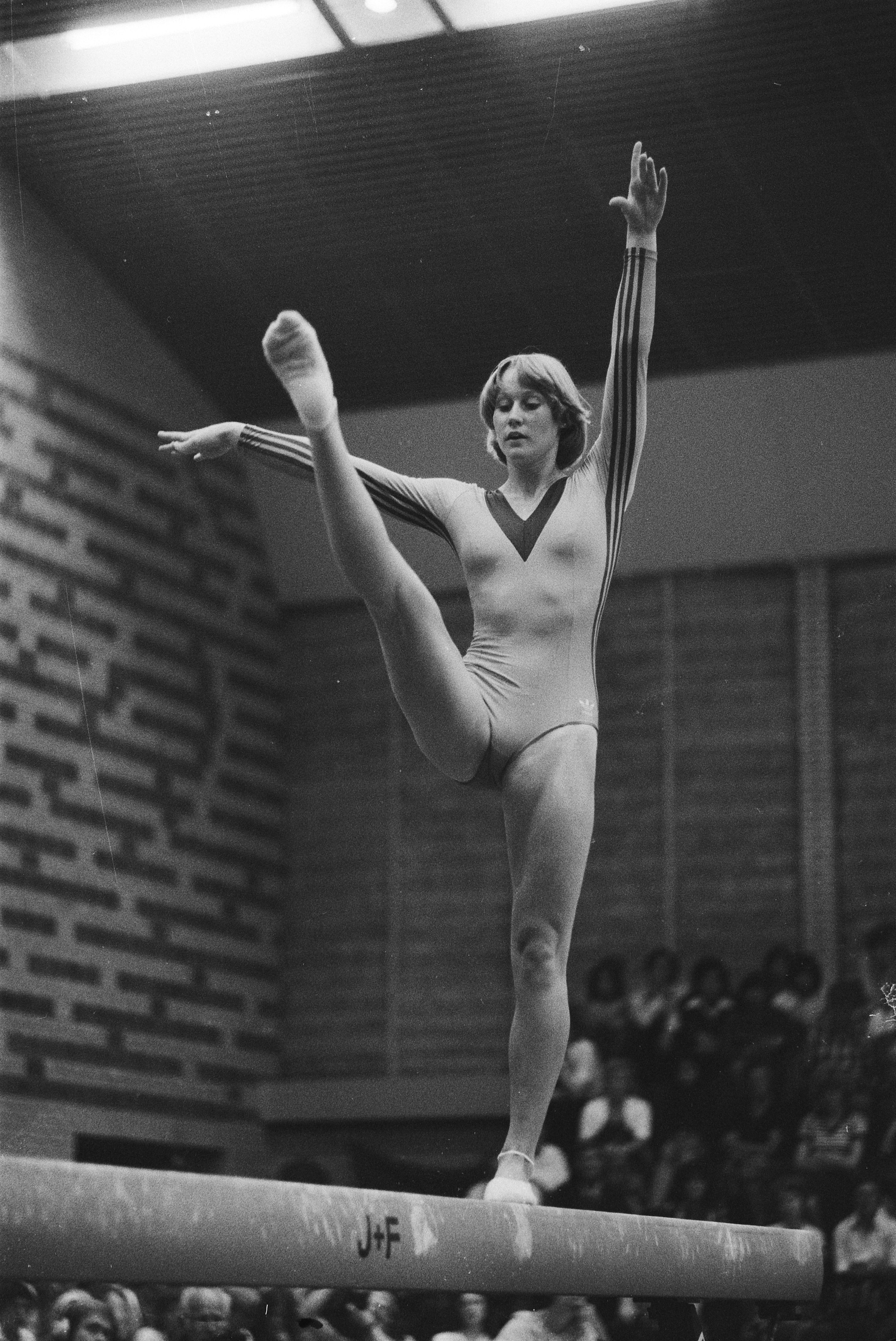
Monique Bolleboom, 1978

=== Public thinking & public service ===
- Antonius van den Broek (1870 in Zoetermeer - 1926), amateur physicist and lawyer
- Hilbrand Nawijn (born 1948), Dutch politician, lives in Zoetermeer
- Bert van der Spek (born 1949 in Zoetermeer), ancient historian, specializing in the Seleucid Empire
- Charlie Aptroot (born 1950), Dutch politician, Mayor of Zoetermeer since 2012
- Dick Schoof (born 1957), Dutch civil servant and politician, former Prime Minister of the Netherlands from 2024 to 2026, lives in Zoetermeer
- Martijn van Dam (born 1978 in Zoetermeer), Dutch engineer and politician, member of the Second Rutte cabinet
- Rutger de Regt (born 1979 in Zoetermeer), furniture designer
- Samira Rafaela (born 1989), Dutch politician

=== The arts ===
- Dennis Princewell Stehr (born 1984 in Zoetermeer) stage name Mr Probz, Dutch singer-songwriter, rapper, producer and actor
- San Holo (born 1990 in Zoetermeer) a Dutch DJ, musician, record producer and composer
- Shandro Jahangier (born 1992 in Zoetermeer) stage name Sandro Silva, a Dutch DJ and record producer
- Romee Strijd (born 1995 in Zoetermeer) a Dutch model

=== Sport ===
- Jopie Selbach (1918–1998 in Zoetermeer) Dutch freestyle swimmer, gold medallist at the 1936 Summer Olympics
- Xenia Stad-de Jong (1922–2012 in Zoetermeer), Dutch track and field athlete, gold medallist at the 1948 Summer Olympics
- Monique Bolleboom (born 1962 in Zoetermeer) a former artistic gymnast, competed at the 1976 Summer Olympics
- Patrick van Leeuwen (born 1969), professional football manager and former player
- Karen Venhuizen (born 1984 in Zoetermeer) a Dutch former competitive figure skater
- Suzanne Harmes (born 1986 in Zoetermeer) a Dutch gymnast, competed at the 2004 and 2008 Summer Olympics
- Remon van Bochoven (born 1989 in Zoetermeer) a Dutch footballer, over 185 club caps
- Leroy Fer (born 1990 in Zoetermeer) a Dutch footballer, over 300 club caps and has represented the national side
- Yara van Kerkhof (born 1990 in Zoetermeer) a Dutch short track speed skater, silver medallist at the 2018 Winter Olympics
- Charlton Vicento (born 1991 in Zoetermeer) is a Curaçaoan footballer with over 150 club caps

== Panorama ==
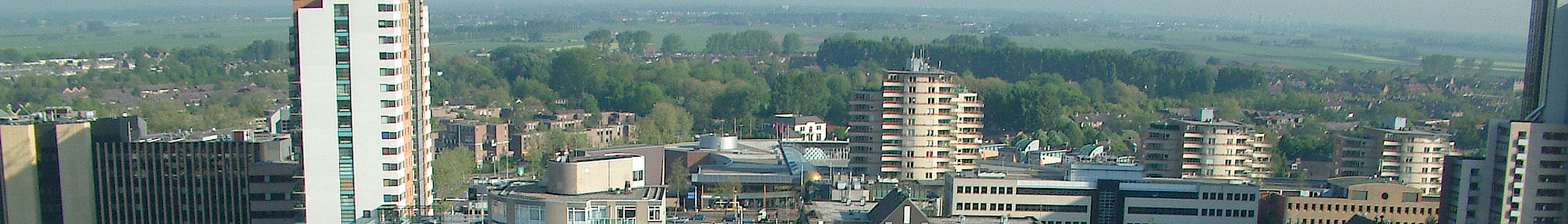
Zoetermeer Wikivoyage Banner
