= Dickerson Whitewater Course =

Artificial whitewater course in Maryland, United States

Coordinates: 39.2088°N 77.4685°W

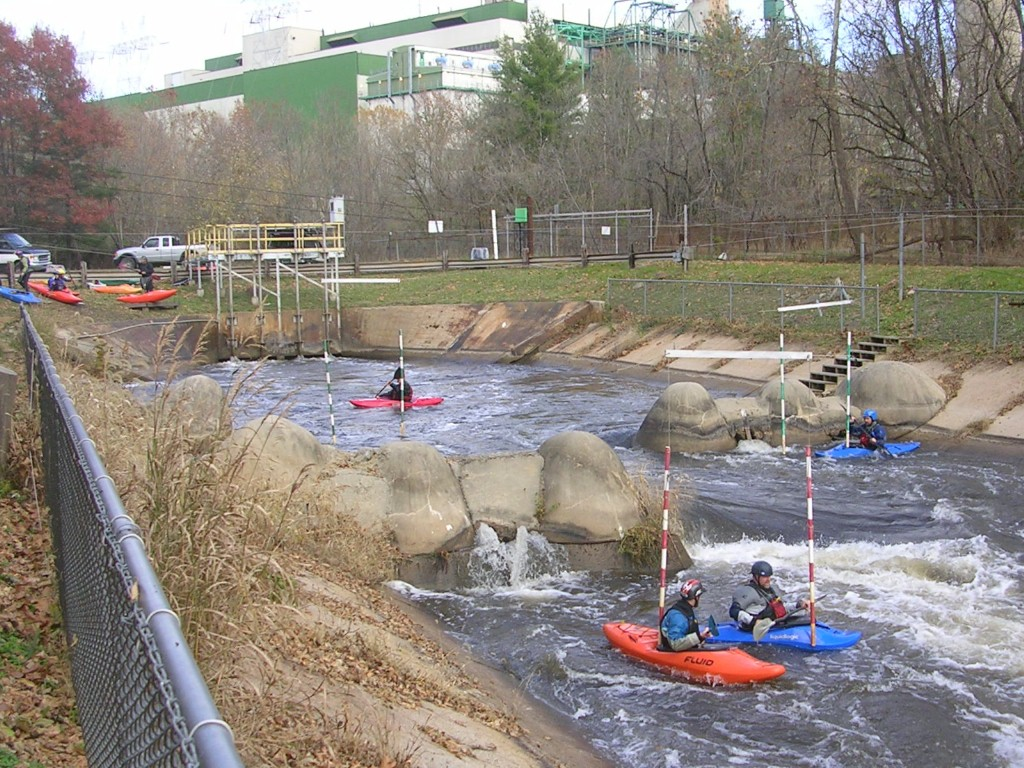
Dickerson Whitewater Course starting point. Power plant in background. Plastic kayaks enter the course by sliding down the concrete channel wall. More delicate fiberglass or composite slalom boats can be carried down the steps.

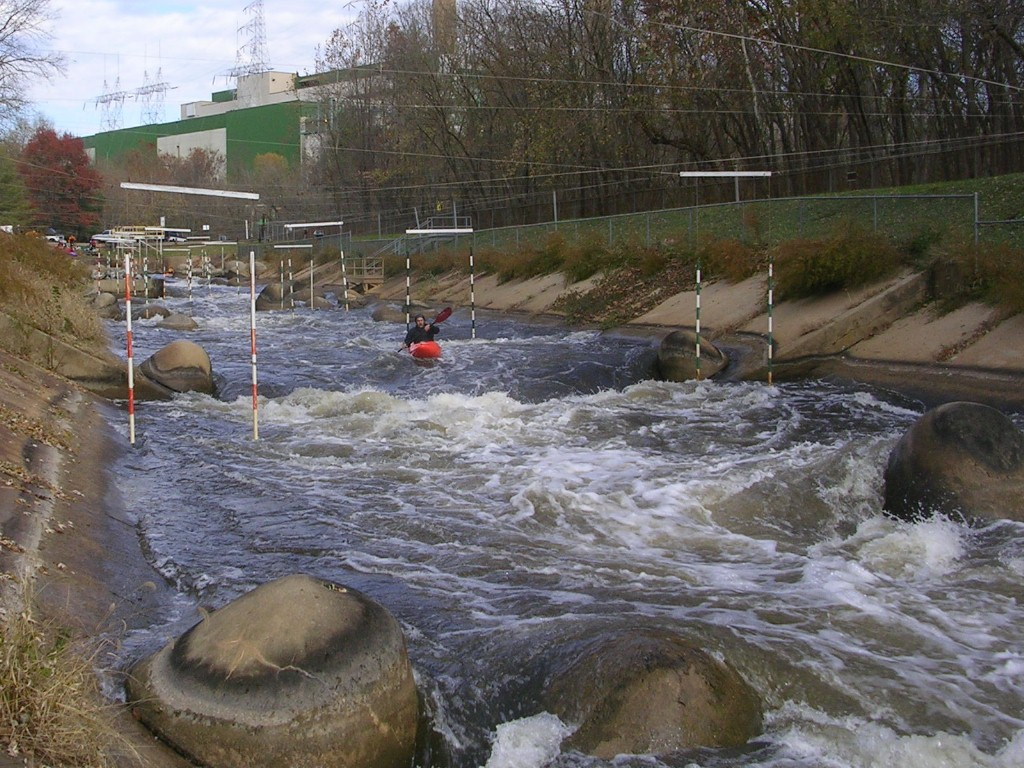
Midpoint of the 900-foot-long course.

The Dickerson Whitewater Course, on the Potomac River near Dickerson, Maryland, was built for use by canoe and kayak paddlers training for the 1992 Olympic Games in Spain. It was the first pump-powered artificial whitewater course built in North America, and is still the only one anywhere with heated water. It remains an active training center for whitewater slalom racing, swiftwater rescue training, and other whitewater activities.

The facility is owned by the NRG Energy company. Except during special events, access requires membership in the Potomac Whitewater Racing Center, a USA Canoe/Kayak National Training Center.

The course was constructed in 1991, inside a pre-existing straight, 900-foot (270 m)-long concrete channel, 40 feet (12 m) wide. Since 1959, the channel has returned cooling water from the Dickerson Generating Station to the Potomac River, 41 miles (66 km) upstream from Washington, D.C. Water is pumped from the river, warmed as much as 35 °F (20 °C) as it cools the power plant's three coal-fired generators, and then emptied into the channel for gravity flow back to the river. (The plant has three other generators which use a different cooling system.)

Streamflow through the course is 200 cu ft/s (5.7 m^{3}/s) to 600 cu ft/s (17 m^{3}/s), depending on the operation of the plant's three coal-fired generators and their six cooling water pumps. In the summer months, when water temperature in the channel exceeds 100 °F (38 °C), the course is closed for health reasons. It is also closed when the Potomac River rises above 5 feet (1.5 m) on the Little Falls gauge 20,000 cu ft/s (570 m^{3}/s), flooding the lower section of the course.

== History ==
In the 1960s, local canoe and kayak paddlers began conducting winter practice in the heated Potomac River water immediately below the discharge channel. Nearly three decades went by before paddler Scott Wilkinson got the idea of moving the practice up into the concrete-lined channel itself. In 1991, he sold his idea to two of the power plant managers, and, in support of the 1992 Olympics team, the Potomac Electric Power Company, Pepco, which owned the plant at the time, approved the insertion of approximately 75 artificial concrete boulders and two wing dams into the channel.

Wilkinson's fellow paddler John Anderson, an architect, built a 1:12 scale model with flow-diversion features similar to those in the Segre Olympic Park artificial course in La Seu d'Urgell, Spain, built for the 1992 games. The model was tested at the Navy's David Taylor Model Basin.

Construction companies building combustion turbine units on (and for) the Pepco Site, donated time and equipment, and the course was opened in December 1991. The first race was held in June 1992. Athletes who trained at the Dickerson course won bronze and gold medals in the 1992 Olympics, and others have continued to win Olympic medals and world championships in subsequent years.

The course was redesigned in the fall of 2002, once again by John Anderson. A new scale model was built, this one outdoors and onsite. After testing his new arrangement of flow-diversion features on the model, he specified new locations for some of the artificial boulders. The wing dam on the left side was moved downstream into section four. A crane was deployed for the moving job.

In October 2003 a persistent problem at the end of the course was fixed. Whenever the Potomac River level is below 3.5 ft (1.1 m) on the Little Falls gauge 6,000 cu ft/s (170 m^{3}/s), there is a sheer drop between the end of the concrete channel and the river. In certain conditions of high course flow and low river level, a stream-wide retentive hydraulic, or "sticky hole," posed a hazard to paddlers who failed to correctly "boof stroke" across the drop. It was a worse problem for paddlers who had made a wet exit from an upside-down boat and were swimming the course.

This feature was modified by adding a concrete slab under the drop and two trapezoid-shaped diverters on the sides. The hydraulic was converted into a central tongue of water ending in a wave train, with an eddy on each side.

== Present course design ==
The course has four 200 ft (61 m) sections, connected in a straight line, end-to-end, with a 2-foot (0.61 m) drop at the end of each section. A final 100-foot (30 m) section ends in the river, with or without a drop, depending on the river level. Overall slope adds another seven feet of drop, for a total course drop of 15 feet (4.6 m), plus zero to four feet (0 to 1.2 meters) into the river at the end. The following map shows the arrangement of the visible and submerged features.

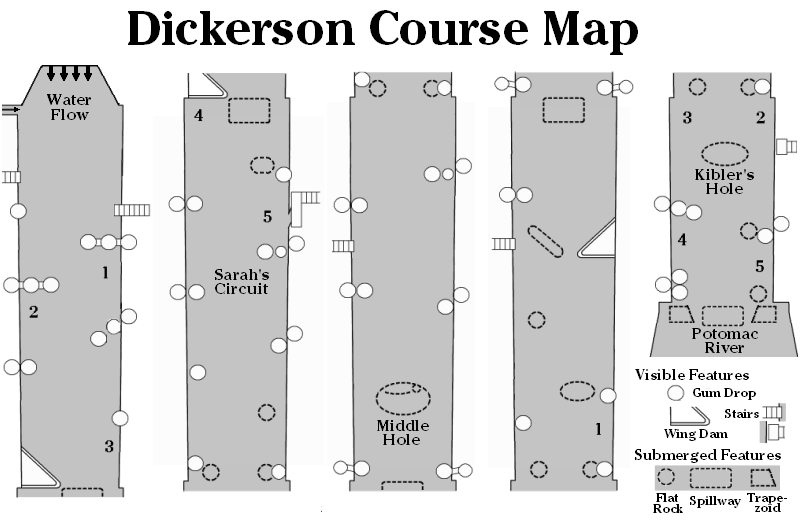

To use the course without a certified instructor present, a paddler must pass a "blue card" test: namely, pause in each of the numbered eddies, in sequence, and roll in the current, not in an eddy, between eddies 1 and 5 at the top, and again between eddies 1 and 5 at the bottom. During the blue card test, the course must be running near full flow, 450 cu ft/s (13 m^{3}/s), and the river must be low enough that there is a significant drop from the bottom of the course into the river.

== Unique features of the course ==
Because the water channel was designed for an industrial, rather than a recreational, function, there are no wide pools to serve as resting spots, and there is no easy way off the water, short of the end. The water is deceptively fast, and all but two of the eddies have swirling water with an upstream component. From the river, paddlers must carry their boats the length of the course to re-enter and make another run.

There are two other artificial whitewater courses in the mid-Atlantic region: in Charlotte, NC, and McHenry, MD. The Charlotte course, U.S. National Whitewater Center, USNWC, opened in 2006, and the McHenry course, Adventure Sports Center International, ASCI, opened in 2007. They do not have heated water. The Dickerson Power Plant operates at a fraction of what it did 10 years ago, so the heated water is decreased accordingly. They both feature circular water channels with conveyor belt lifts from the course end to the beginning, plus bigger drops, wider eddies, mid-course pools, and guided raft trips for tourists. Dickerson is for decked, hard-shell boats only. All three facilities are used for canoe and kayak training and as venues for competitions.

== Gallery ==
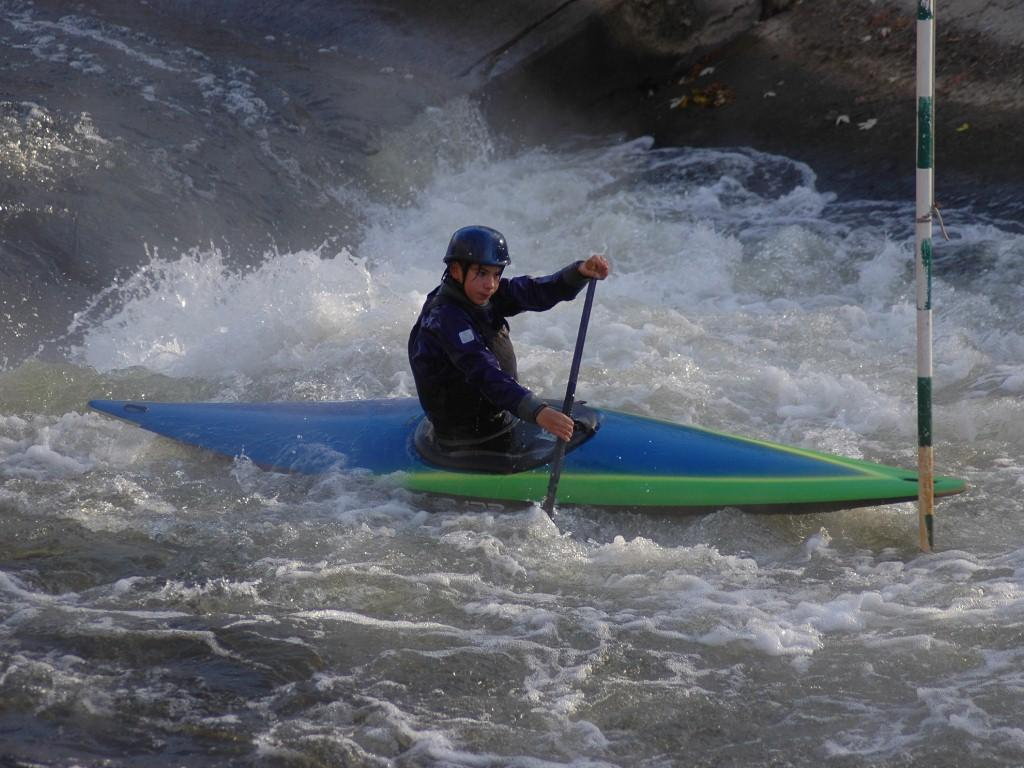
Slalom Practice. Paddling a C1, decked canoe.

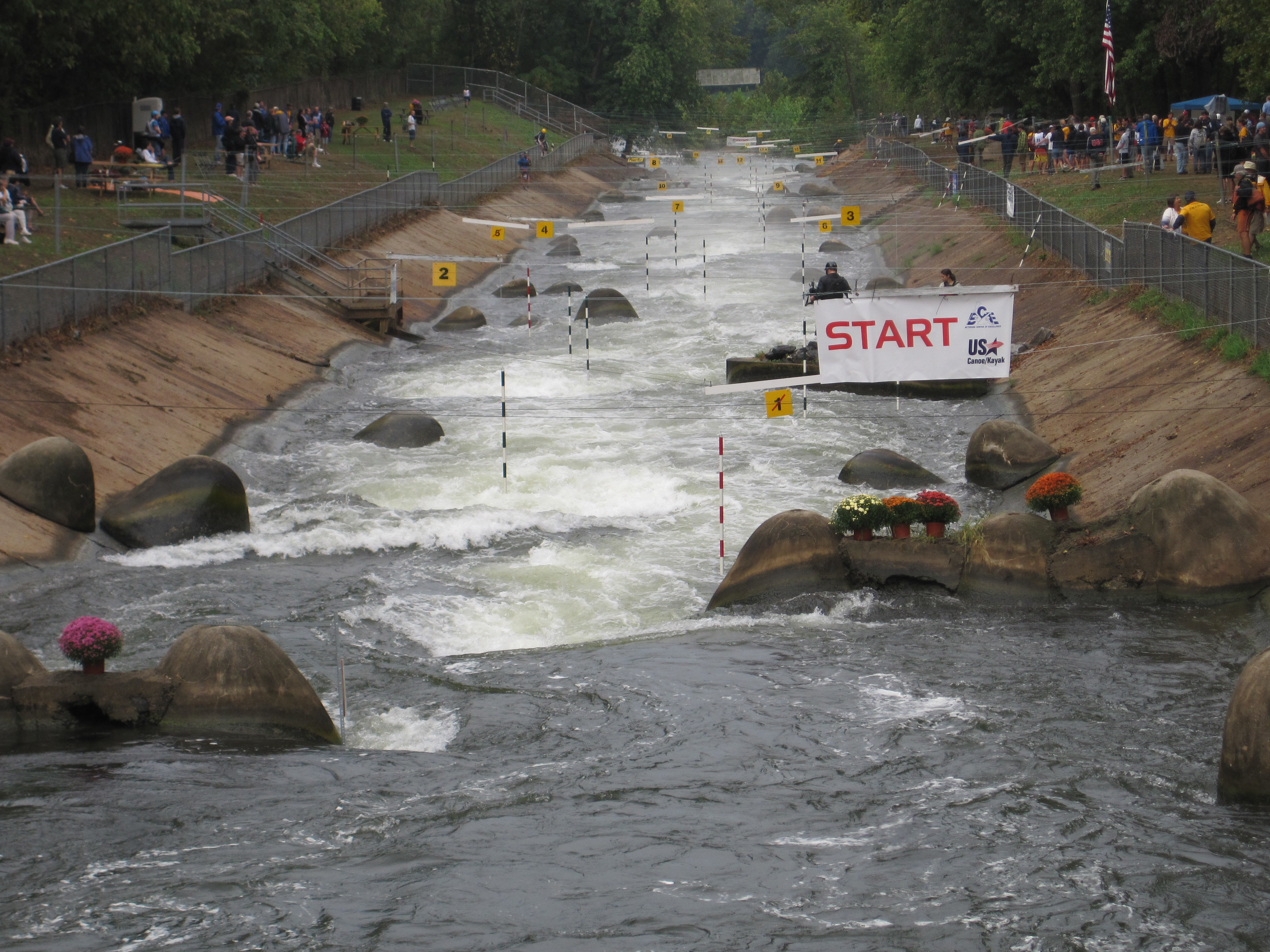
2010 Nationals. 22 gates for the September 26 race.

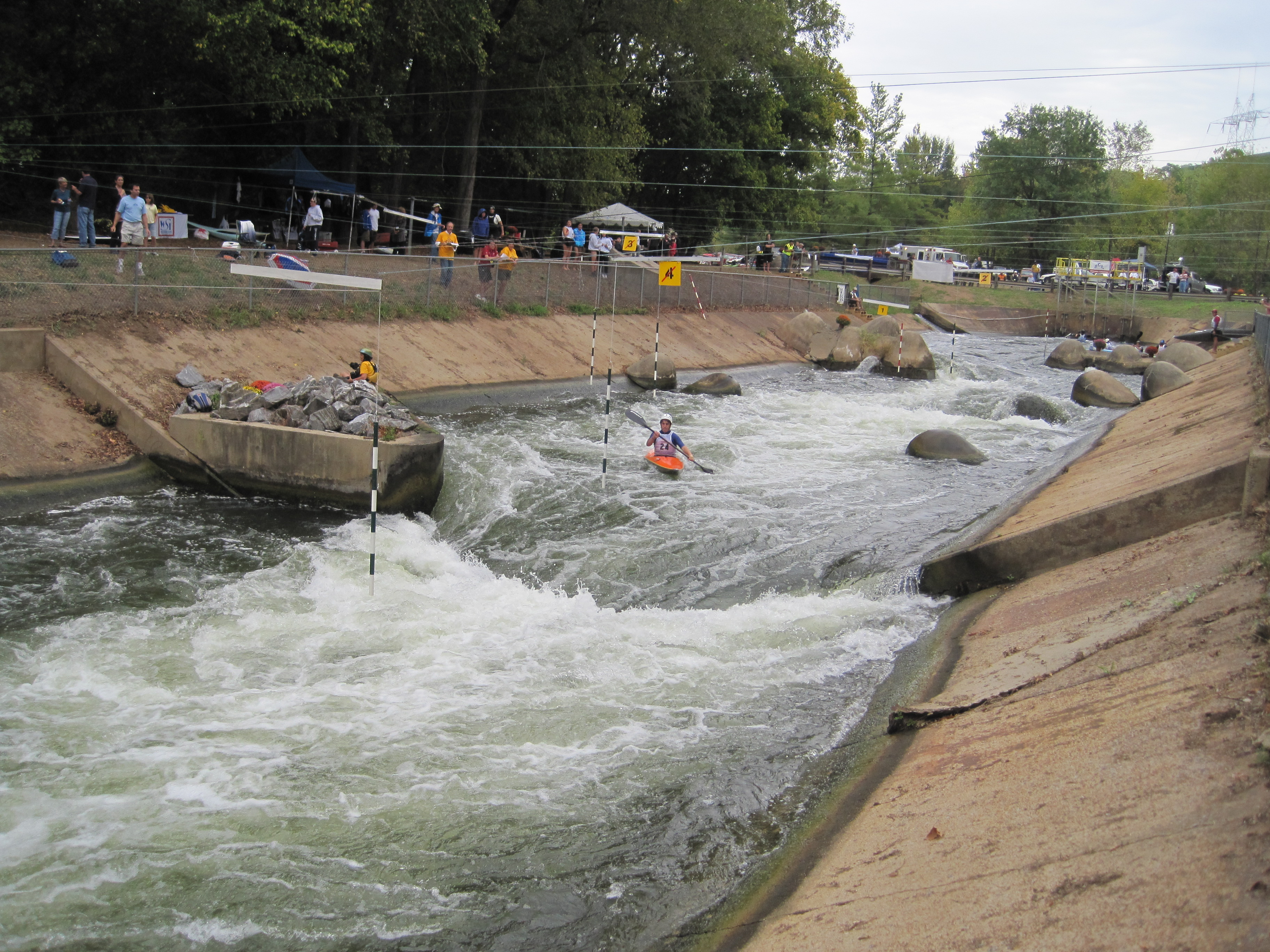
Gate #4 at the first drop, poles on separate wires.

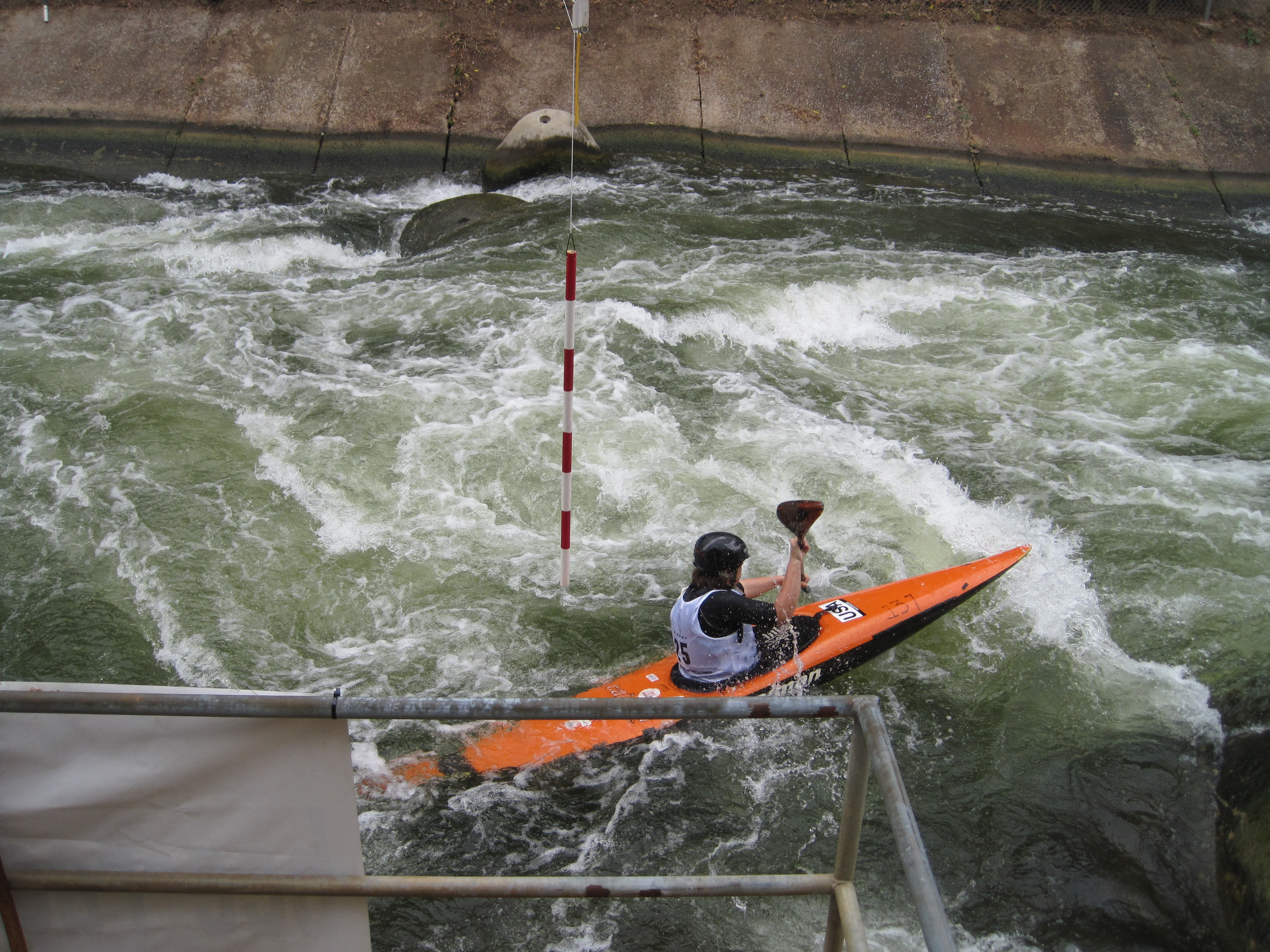
Gate #5, single-pole upstream.

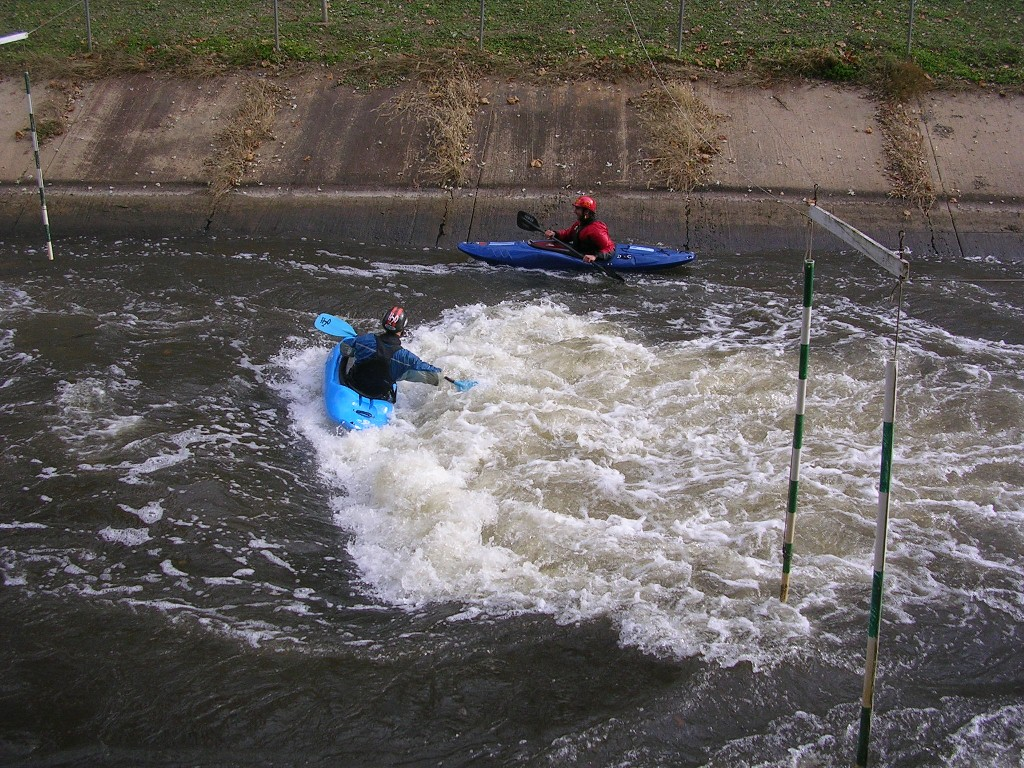
Features of the Channel. Side-surfing in the Middle Hole at full flow 600 cu ft/s (17 m^{3}/s).

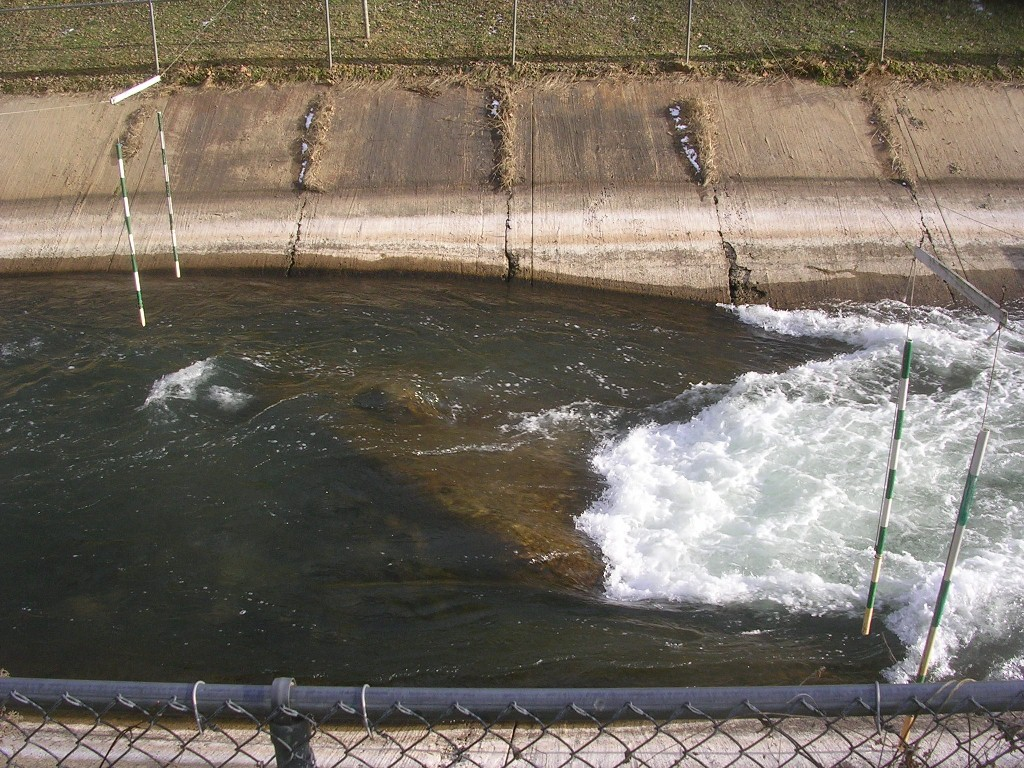
Middle Hole at low flow 200 cu ft/s (5.7 m^{3}/s), revealing the underwater rock that creates it.

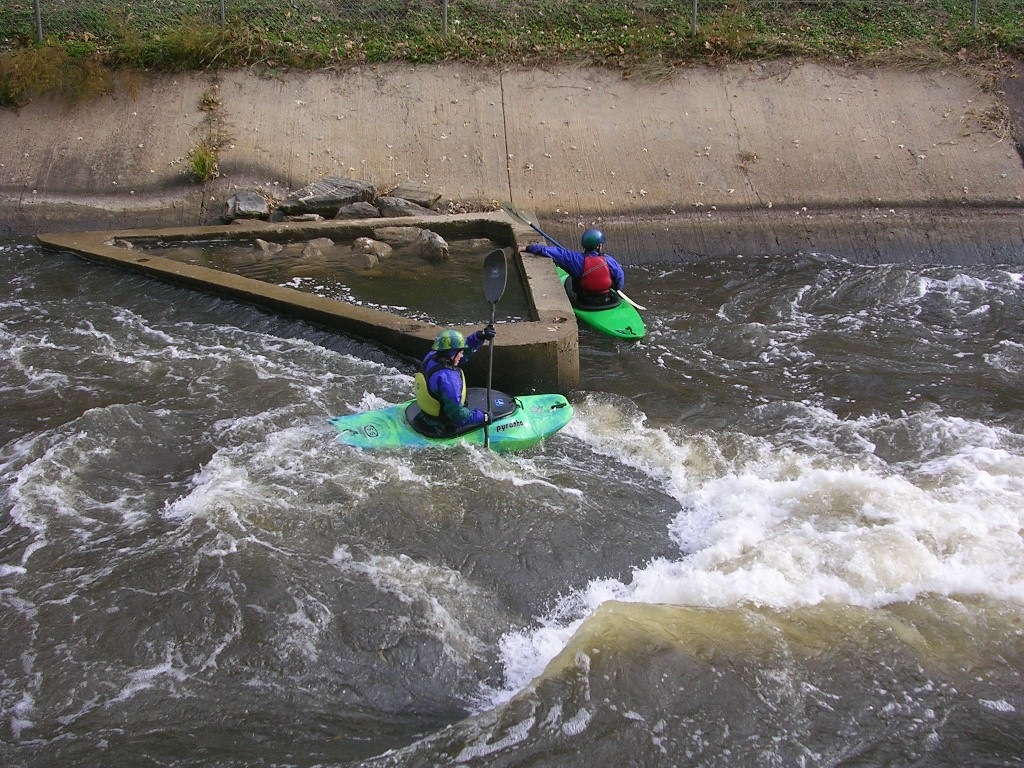
One of two resting spots -- this one below the left-side wing dam in its new position.

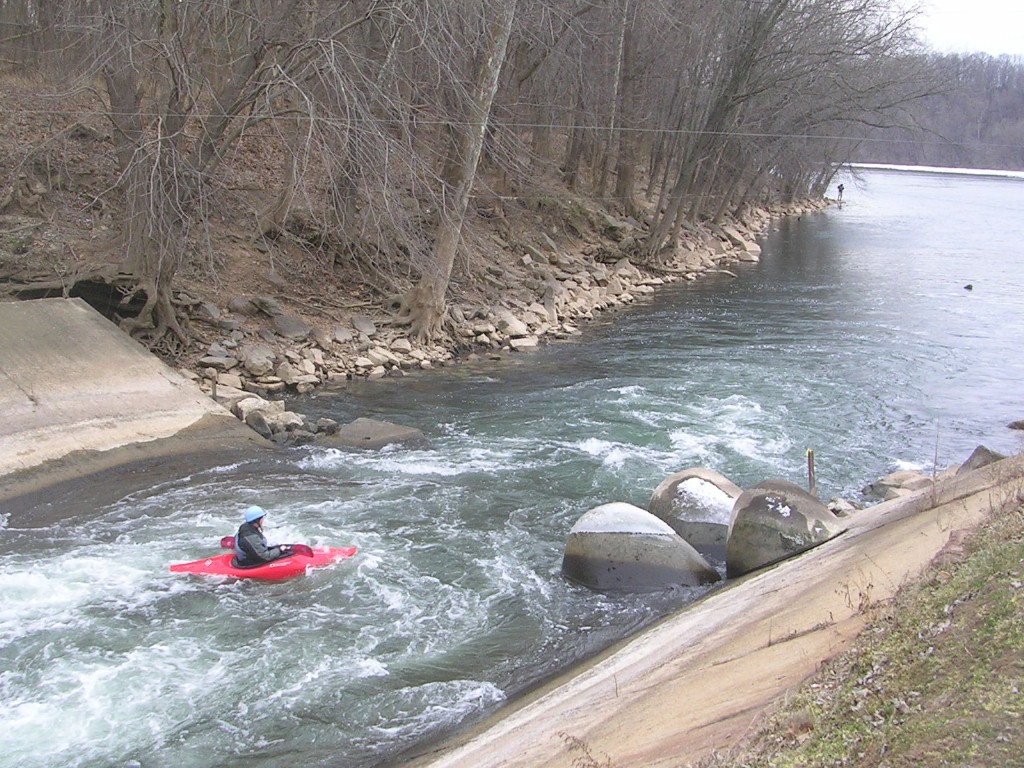
A winter day when the Potomac River was high enough to flood the final drop.

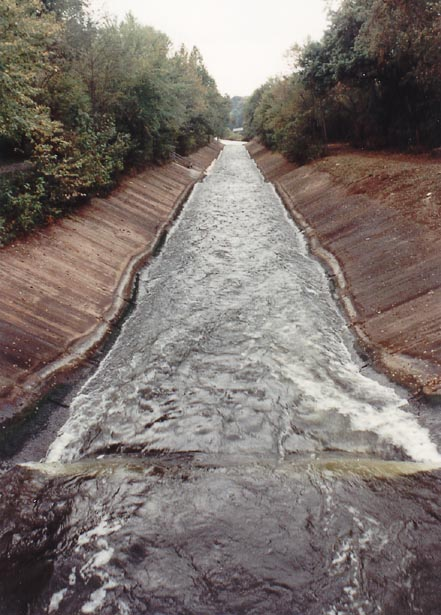
1991. The channel as it was 1959-1991.

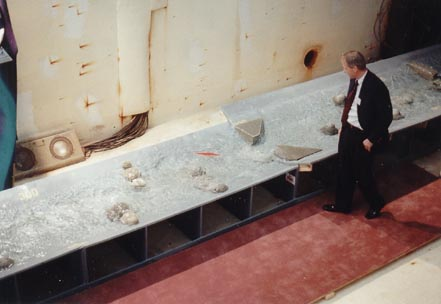
Running water through the model.

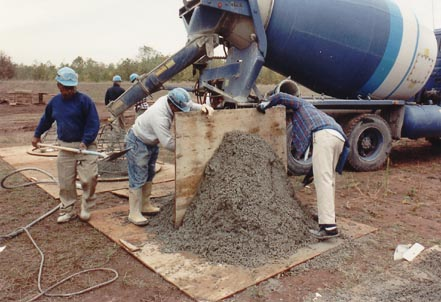
Shaping the concrete boulders.

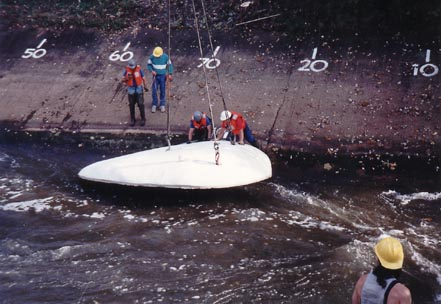
Lowering them into place (water flowing).

Washington Post full-page graphic

== Video Links ==
- The course at low flow, medium flow, and full flow.
- Kibler's Hole at medium flow.
- Slide Show 2006
- The Bottom Hole before the 2003 fix.
- Two complete slalom runs 1 and 2 by 2008 U.S. Olympian Scott Parsons.
