= Remon van Bochoven =

Dutch footballer

Personal information
- Date of birth: 11 November 1989 (age 36)
- Place of birth: Zoetermeer, Netherlands
- Position: Forward

Youth career
- SV DSO
- Haaglandia

Senior career*
Years	Team	Apps	(Gls)
2009–2012	Haaglandia	43	(26)
2012–2013	Rijnsburgse Boys	26	(7)
2013–2014	Achilles '29	35	(6)
2014–2015	Haaglandia	15	(9)
2015–2019	Westlandia	62	(29)
2019–2021	SV DSO		
2021–2022	Westlandia	1	(0)
Total		182	(77)
- * Club domestic league appearances and goals

Remon van Bochoven (born 27 April 1989) is a Dutch former footballer who plays as a forward.

== Club career ==
Van Bochoven was the leading goalscorer in the 2011–12 Topklasse campaign with 25 goals in 27 games. After unsuccessful trials at FC Utrecht and Heracles Almelo, Van Bochoven joined Rijnsburgse Boys in the summer of 2012. A year later he moved to new Eerste Divisie side Achilles '29.

After being released by Achilles, van Bochoven returned to Haaglandia, only to move on to Westlandia the next season.

Van Bochoven returned to his first club DSO from Zoetermeer in 2019. In October 2021, he returned to Westlandia.
