= Dutch Water Dreams =

Olympic whitewater course in Zoetermeer, Netherlands

Coordinates: 52.047°N 4.521°E

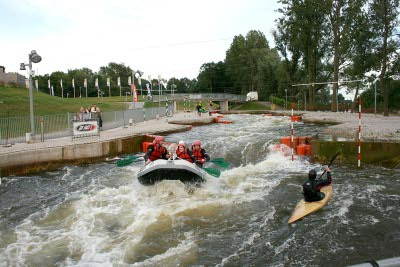
Rafting and canoeing at Dutch Water Dreams

Dutch Water Dreams (DWD) was an Olympic artificial whitewater and surfing centre in the Van Tuyllpark in Zoetermeer, Netherlands. It went bankrupt on 5 October 2015.

Water was pumped electrically down a series of drops, fashioned in concrete and between plastic bollards. The centre also contained a FlowRider sheet wave surfing system.

== History ==
The whitewater facility was opened on October 20, 2006.

During a periodically check in January 2015, DWD found corrosion on the metal parts in the FlowRider area. This corrosion adopted aggressive forms compared to the last measurement. Based on these findings it was decided to close the FlowRiders area immediately. An architectural research firm was hired to check the construction extensively, as the personal safety of the visitors and the structural safety of the building could not be guaranteed. Eventually, it led to the demise of the attraction. An adjacent swimming pool uses its parking lot.
