= Zegwaart =

Coordinates: 52°04′N 4°31′E

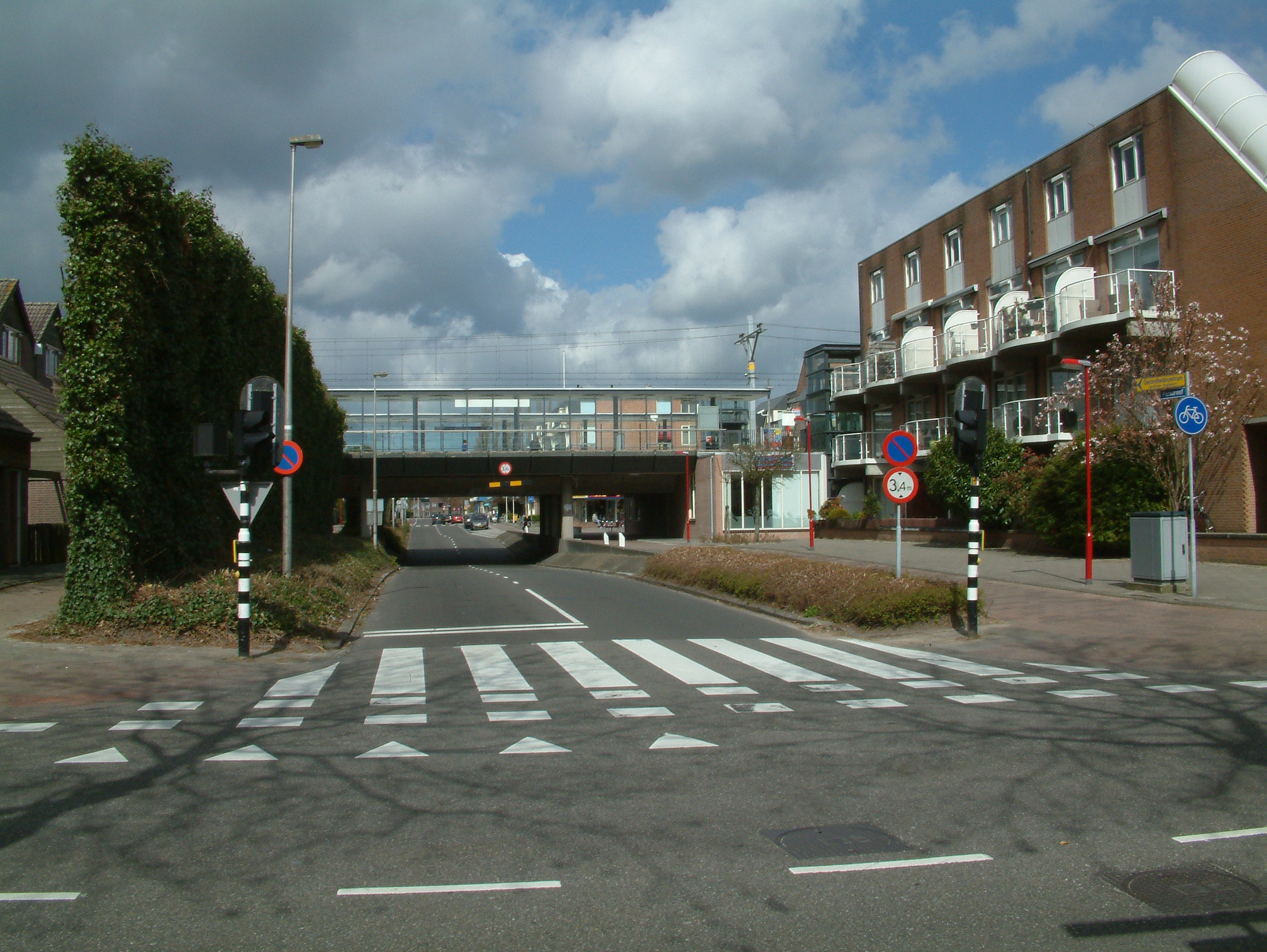
Station Seghwaert

Zegwaart (or Zegwaard) was a village in the Dutch province of South Holland. It was located directly to the east of Zoetermeer. Around 1978 a division of Zoetermeer was named after the old village and got the name Seghwaert.

Zegwaart was a separate municipality until 1935, when it became part of Zoetermeer, using the archaic spelling of the locale's name Seghwaert. The old Zegwaart was a ribbon development along what remains until today as Zegwaartseweg, which is perpendicular to Dorpstraat. It is further divided into Seghwaert-Oost (2723), -Midden (2724) and -Noord (2727).
