= Kwik Save =

British convenience store chain

- Logo since 2012
- Type: Public company
- Industry: Retail; Groceries
- Founded: 1959 (original); 2012 (revival)
- Founder: Albert Gubay
- Defunct: 2007 (original); 2022 (revival)
- Headquarters: Prestatyn (1959–2006) (Payroll & HR only after 1998); Bristol (1998–2006); Huddersfield (2006–2007); York (2012–2022)
- Key people: Albert Gubay (Founder)
- Products: Groceries
- Parent: Somerfield (1998–2006); BTTF Ltd (2006–2007); Costcutter (2012–2020); Bestway Wholesale (2020-2022)
- Website: www.kwiksave.co.uk at the Wayback Machine (archived 22 May 2022)

Kwik Save was a British convenience store chain. (Note: This article describes the chain based in the United Kingdom. There are also several unrelated shops of the same name in the United States.) Prior to 2007, it was also a discount supermarket chain that had shops across the United Kingdom. It went into administration in July 2007, but was brought back in April 2012. Its shops were small to medium-sized high street supermarkets, mainly located in areas with below average incomes.

It struggled to make profits during the 2000s, as supermarket operators such as Asda, Tesco and Sainsbury's introduced their own budget brands, and foreign competitors such as Lidl, Aldi and Netto (who all arrived in the United Kingdom during the first half of the 1990s) expanded.

The company was listed on the London Stock Exchange, and was once a constituent of the FTSE 100 Index. It went into administration on 6 July 2007, and closed most of its shops across the United Kingdom, with the remaining 56 being sold to a new company, FreshXpress, which itself went into administration in March 2008.

It was then resurrected in a smaller form with nine shops, but this second incarnation of FreshXpress went into administration, and ceased trading in April 2009. All remaining shops have since been closed. The brand was relaunched as a budget fascia for convenience shops supplied by Costcutter in April 2012.

Upon closure, the stores left in abandonment were popular to explore within urban exploring community, a hobby of exploring abandoned buildings, particularly in Felling, Tyne and Wear, where pentagrams were vandalized inside the property and a pig's head was found inside.

== History ==
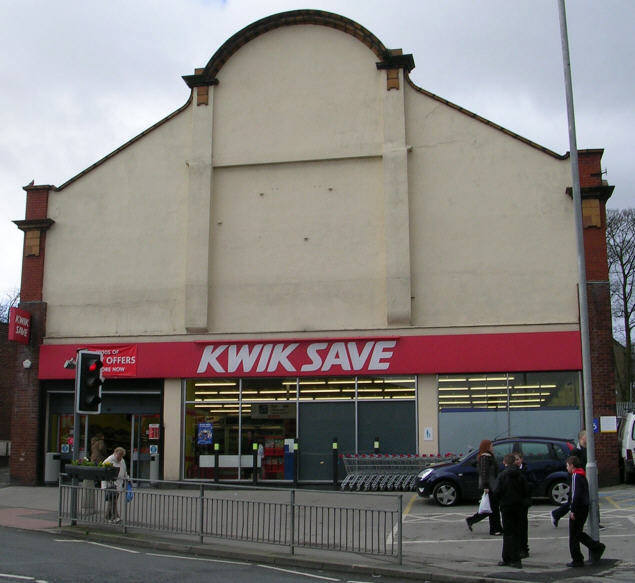
A Kwiksave branch trading in Pudsey, West Yorkshire, in 2007.

=== Foundation ===
It was founded as Value Foods by Welsh entrepreneur Albert Gubay on 11 May 1959 and based in Prestatyn. The company rented its first retail shop in Queen Street, Rhyl, in July 1959. Further traditional shops were opened in Chester and Wrexham. In 1964, Gubay visited the United States with fellow director Ken Nicholson, and learnt about the "baby shark" method of retailing.

Combined with ideas gained from West German retailer Aldi, the business model was based on buying a limited range of lines on favourable (net 60 or 90 days) payment terms, distributing and selling them at or below cost before the payment fell due, and using the interest on the resulting cash flow to fund the business.

The first Kwik Save Discount branded shop opened in Colwyn Bay, produced more sales than the existing supermarkets of Value Foods, and by 1967, Kwik Save Discount had thirteen shops.

Just before it was floated on to the London Stock Exchange in November 1970, the company changed its name to Kwik Save Discount Group Ltd. In 1973, Gubay sold Kwik Save for $28 million. Gubay repeated the low price retail model using the 3 Guys brand in New Zealand, Ireland and the United States.

=== 1990s ===
In November 1994, Kwik Save acquired 117 supermarkets from Shoprite, a fellow food discounter, for £45 million. The company subsequently accepted that it was focused too much on acquisitions rather than its existing operations. It announced the closure of 107 underperforming shops in November 1996.

=== Merger with Somerfield ===
In February 1998, Kwik Save merged with Somerfield, and began operating as a trading division of Somerfield Stores Ltd.

All Kwik Save shops were to be rebranded as Somerfield, but it was quickly realised that the look and feel of existing Kwik Save shops – featuring warehouse style wooden shelving, space saving small checkouts and narrow aisles – would not lend itself well to the Somerfield fascia. For this reason, the plan was abandoned and the best Kwik Save shops were converted, based on location and market demand, receiving a full refurbishment. Meanwhile Somerfield's own Food Giant discount supermarkets were rebranded as Kwik Save.

=== Sale of shops to BTTF ===
On 27 February 2006, Somerfield Stores Ltd sold the brand and the remaining 171 shops to BTTF, an investment vehicle headed by Paul Niklas, for an undisclosed sum. Somerfield rebranded the 102 Kwik Save locations it retained under its own name and a further 77 shops were sold to other retailers, including 19 to Netto.

According to a report in PR Week in April 2006, Kwik Save hired a marketing agency in a bid to revitalise the brand and reposition it as an alternative to the leading supermarkets. Around £200,000 was allocated to public relations as part of a marketing brief worth £4m-£5m.

In October 2006 a £30m refinancing package from unnamed investors was partly used to purchase a further 45 shops from Somerfield. Some of those were part of the Competition Commission investigation into Somerfield's purchase of 114 Safeway Compact shops in 2004.

In December 2006, The Sunday Times reported that Kwik Save was suffering from a "sharp fall in sales and mounting losses", and was seeking another financial injection. On 22 January 2007, it was reported that Kwik Save was suffering problems over delays in payment to its major suppliers, with stocks of many core products being limited as a result.

On 29 January 2007, it was reported that a new investor was about to inject £70 million into the Kwik Save business. In mid February 2007, the company announced that it had managed to source a £50 million refinancing package to revive the failing retailer. In March 2007, the £50 million deal was finalised, and Paul Niklas returned as managing director of the company. The holding company changed its name from BTTF to Kwik Save Limited.

=== Shop closures ===
Closed branch of Kwik Save in Warrington, 13 July 2007.

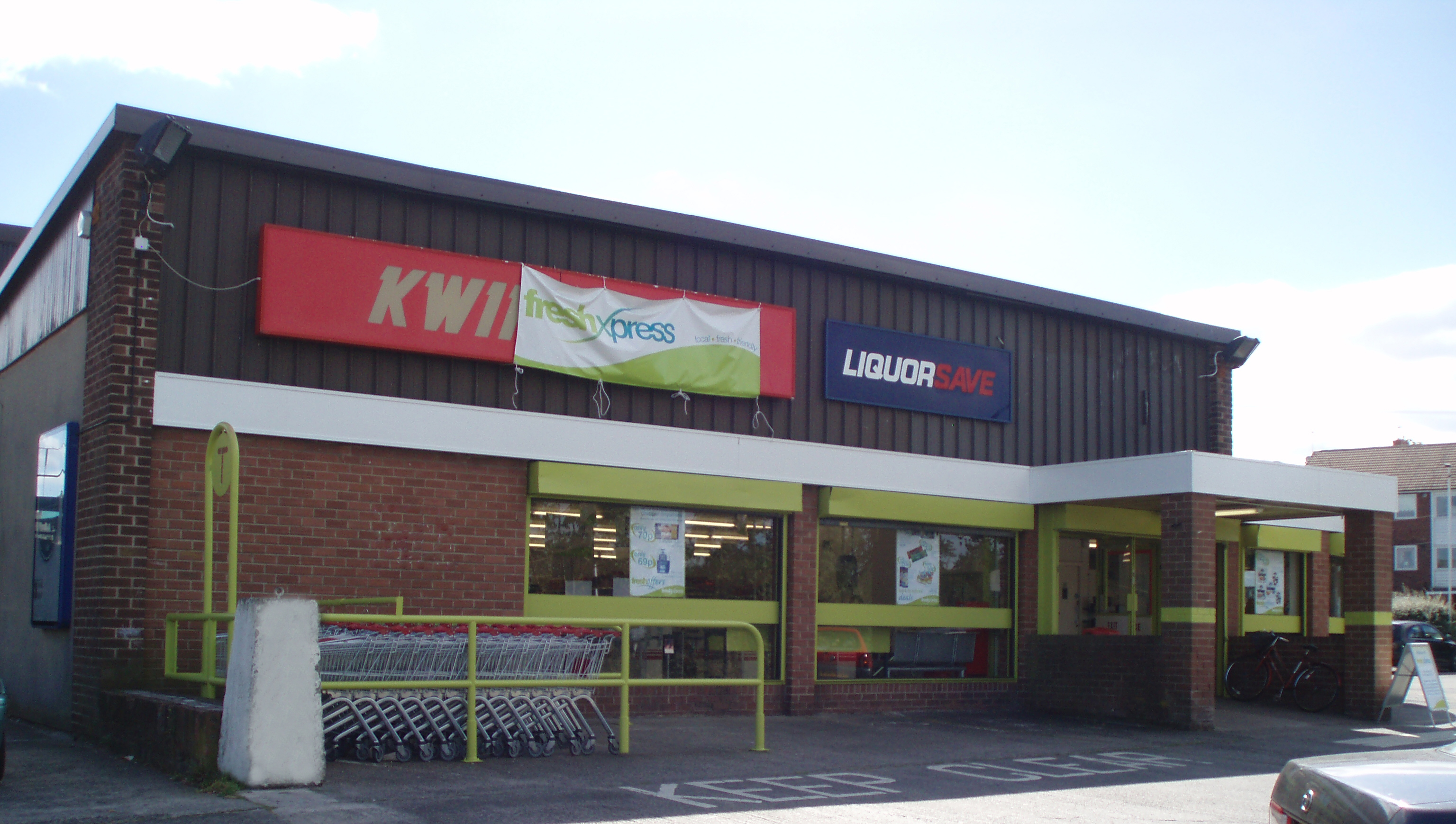
FreshXpress Fawdon during the rebranding in 2007.

On 29 May 2007, Kwik Save announced plans to close 79 shops with immediate effect. By 30 May 2007, all shops affected were closed. Kwik Save's market share fell from 1.2% in the twelve weeks to April 2006 to 0.2% in the same period in 2007, according to TNS Worldpanel. BBC News also reported that Arla Foods UK stopped delivering fresh milk to the Kwik Save chain in the week beginning 21 May 2007, due to "payment problems".

On 14 June 2007, Kwik Save announced plans to close a further twenty two shops with immediate effect, in order to protect them from the danger of administration. The group had now closed a third of its shops across United Kingdom, leading to up to seven hundred job losses.

On 21 June 2007, Kwik Save announced to the Union of Shop, Distributive and Allied Workers that it would not be paying staff, who were expecting to be paid the following day. On 6 July 2007, the company was placed into administration. Kwik Save was left with 56 shops, which were transferred to a new company called FreshXpress, run by Irish retail entrepreneur Brendan Murtagh.

Under the deal, all 56 shops stayed open, saving around six hundred jobs. Most employees of Kwik Save were unlikely to be paid, having to join other creditors to claim money they were owed from the Official Receiver, unless they were part of the 56 shops going to FreshXpress.

=== Relaunch as convenience shop brand ===
In April 2012, the Kwik Save brand was relaunched by its new owners Costcutter as a more budget oriented fascia offering for members of its symbol group of independently owned convenience shops. The first new shop opened in Little Lever, Bolton. In December 2022, Bestway Wholesale, who had purchased Costcutter in December 2020, announced that it would be consolidating its symbol groups under the Costcutter, Best-One, Bargain Booze and Wine Rack brands, thus phasing out the Kwik Save brand in the process. Despite this, the website would remain online, albeit in a broken state, until April 2026.

== Operations ==
=== Brand image ===
Kwik Save shops were primarily aimed at the lower end of the food market, a position which was maintained throughout the company's history, except for the introduction of some non-food lines during the Somerfield era.

The firm always traded on value pricing, with utilitarian shop fittings, basic checkouts and charges for carrier bags. In the early years, when the company had little in the way of effective competition, this business model was successful with price-conscious consumers.

The company's quirky image suffered over the years, with increased competition from other discount chains, such as Farmfoods, Iceland and foreign chains Aldi, Lidl, Netto, as well as from larger chains, such as Asda, Tesco, Sainsbury's and Morrisons, which introduced their own 'value' brand ranges. Kwik Save was seen for many years as the poor relation of Somerfield, consisting only of shops which were considered unsuitable for conversion to the more upmarket fascia, resulting in a further dilution of brand strength.

In July 1994, Kwik Save reduced the price of its No Frills Baked Beans, to 7p for a 425g tin, in response to British pricing by Aldi and Netto. In April 1996, Kwik Save again reduced the price of its No Frills Baked Beans, to 5p for a 425g tin, again in response to British pricing by Aldi and Netto, and by Tesco.

=== Shop formats ===
Traditionally, Kwik Save shops had warehouse style wooden shelving, laid out in a traditional style familiar from most early supermarkets.

In an effort to modernise the Kwik Save brand when under Somerfield ownership, the company undertook a programme to renovate its shops, which included new staff uniforms (a black and white chequered shirt which replaced the red T-shirts), new "Asda style" shelves to replace the wooden warehouse racking (referred to as "boards and beams"), new floors, checkouts, colour schemes and lighting.

Renovated shops devoted more space to fresh foods, introduced new features, such as bakeries, and removed the requirement for customers to pay for carrier bags which, for many years, was symbolic of the Kwik Save business model. Around a third of the Kwik Save estate was transformed, with each shop having between £300,000 and £1,000,000 invested in the improvements.

Sales figures from renovated shops suggested that the public did respond positively to the new look, although the profitability of these shops still did not meet that of unrefurbished Somerfield fascia shops.

The off-licence sections of many Kwik Save shops were in a separate department known as Liquorsave. Up until the end of the 1990s, the fruit and vegetable sections and butchery counters were usually run by local franchisees, usually under the name "Colemans". Some shops also rented out space to non food retailers. This format had been reduced since the Somerfield takeover, and concessions were phased out in all shops converted to the Somerfield fascia.

During the 1980s, some Kwik Save shops incorporated a frozen foods section, which traded under the name Arctic Freezer Centres.

=== Own brand goods ===
In the 1990s, the chain launched a No Frills brand, offering cheaper generic products, an idea that has since been taken up by all of the major supermarket chains. This was replaced by the "Simply" range shortly after the merger with Somerfield. In March 2006, the new owners of the chain announced that it would no longer sell own brand goods, switching instead to well known household brands at discount prices.

== Advertising ==
In the 1990s, Kwik Save used adverts featuring Michael Barrymore promoting the Kwiksave Freephone Helpline, which people could call if they wanted to report prices cheaper elsewhere. They ended with the slogan "Kwik Save – Because we're cheap, you're cheerful!" One advert featured Ryan Stiles, best known for appearing on Whose Line Is It Anyway?.

== In popular culture ==
Kwik Save were named checked in the Mansun song Drastic Sturgeon, featuring the lyrics "Shop at Kwik Save and you make a good saving, Difference in prices is truly amazing, Chips from the freezer come in very big portions, Down our end you get fantastic reductions".
