= The Movie Booth =

British DVD rental company

The Movie Booth (In Liquidation)
- Industry: Retail/DVD rental
- Founded: 2006
- Headquarters: Cheltenham, Gloucestershire

The Movie Booth is a company that owns and operates DVD rental kiosks. The company is based in Cheltenham and is a privately owned business.

Each interactive kiosk holds 621 DVDs, comprising new releases and classic titles along with options to rent games and sell movies. To rent a movie, customers choose their title on the touch screen, insert their credit/debit card, and the machine the dispenses the movie(s). The charge per rental is £1.50 per day; keeping a DVD over 14 days is effectively the same as purchasing the DVD.

The kiosks are at stores throughout the UK and Ireland, including Spar, Costcutter, Tesco and Nisa. At present, the business operates company-owned units, with the management of each kiosk being controlled from the company's headquarters.

The company has forty kiosks operating across the UK and Ireland, with kiosk growth affecting the traditional DVD rental business model.

== History ==
Founded in 2006, The Movie Booth focuses on the deployment of automated DVD rental kiosks. The growth of the kiosk network has seen Booth's placed in many national retail chains, with kiosks moving from the convenience store sector into the supermarket industry. The company is fronted by entrepreneur Carlos Marco Rider.
