= Foundation school (medical) =

Postgraduate medical education organisations in the United Kingdom

In the United Kingdom, foundation schools are groups of medical education organisations in a region which work together to deliver the UK Foundation Programme, a form of postgraduate education for medical practitioners. These organisations include medical schools, local education and training boards, integrated care systems, and healthcare providers such as NHS trusts, primary care networks, local authority public health departments, and private or voluntary organisations such as hospices and care homes. As of 2025, there are 18 foundation schools covering the country:

- East of England
- Leicestershire, Northamptonshire and Rutland
- Kent, Surrey and Sussex
- London
- North West of England
- Northern
- Northern Ireland
- Oxford (Thames Valley)
- Peninsula
- Scotland
- Severn
- Trent
- Wales
- Wessex
- West Midlands Central
- West Midlands North
- West Midlands South
- Yorkshire and the Humber
