= GP Patient Survey =

Annual survey of patient experience of British general practice

The GP Patient Survey is an annual survey of patient experience of British general practice. It is one of the largest ever survey programmes of patients registered to receive primary health care. It is now sent out to over two million people across England. A similar survey is conducted in Wales. In Scotland, the Health & Care Experience Survey asks about people's experiences not only of accessing and using their GP practice and Out of Hours services, but also aspects of care and support provided by local authorities and other organisations and caring responsibilities and related support. It has been run every two years since 2009. In Northern Ireland, the GP patient survey ran from 2008/09 to 2010/11.

The results of the survey are published by Ipsos on behalf of NHS England on the GP Patient Survey publication website. Results are available for individual practices and their results are compared to the national average and the local Clinical Commissioning Group.

The first survey was in 1998. The questionnaire has been repeatedly altered. From 2007 the survey has been conducted by a direct postal approach to a sample of patients. Earlier surveys were administered by practices. The 2009 survey was sent to approximately 5,500,000 registered adult patients. In 2021, invitations were sent by letter to a sample of people from each of more than 6800 practices.

The survey has shown that the health of unpaid carers is significantly poorer than that of their non-carer peers.

720,000 responses were received for the 2022 survey. The national response rate was 29.1%. The numbers reporting a good experience had fallen from 83% in 2021 to 72%. 55% of respondents had used an online service - an increase from 44% in 2021. Results are available at national, Integrated Care System, Primary Care Network or practice level.

The GP Patient Survey website has more detailed information for patients and survey results going back to 2007.
