= Push Doctor =

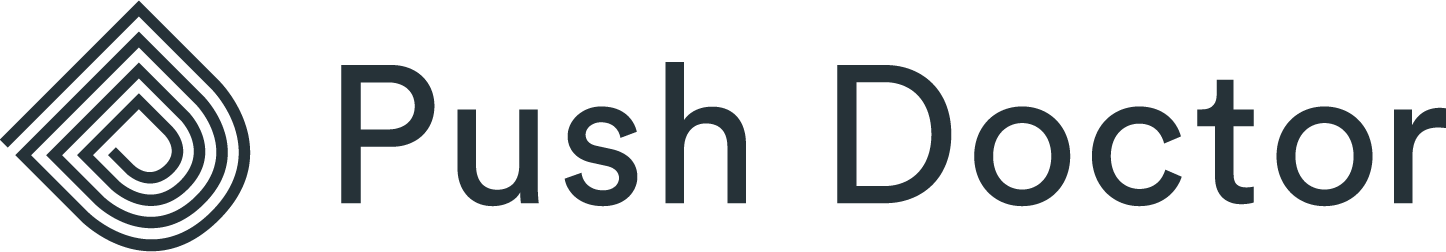
- Website type: Private
- Founded: 2013
- Headquarters: Manchester, {{{location_country}}}
- Key people: Matt Elcock (founder)
- Industry: Healthcare
- Website: pushdoctor.co.uk
- Native clients on: iOS, Android, Windows

Push Doctor was the UK's first platform to offer video consultations with patients online and via smartphone. It is a GP provider and remote consultation enabler in the UK with a reach of 5.4 million patients. Push Doctor is a NHS-commissioned technology provider compliant with the Health Insurance Portability and Accountability Act.

It made a loss of nearly £8 million in the year to 31 July 2021.

It was acquired by Square Health, a provider of private digital healthcare for insurance companies and corporates, in December 2021. At that point it had about 100 staff.

== History ==
The service was founded in July 2013 by Eren Ozagir and Matt Elcock. The idea came to Ozagir after falling ill on a business trip to Baltimore in the United States. Push Doctor initially received $1.2 million in seed funding and in mid-2015 a nationwide television campaign aired to promote the service.

In January 2016, Push Doctor raised $8.2m Series A funding led by Oxford Capital, Draper Esprit and Partech Ventures. Reports suggest the investment would be used to "strengthen brand position, carry out further product innovations, expand the management structure, including making key marketing and product hires".

In September 2016, the service underwent a rebrand that included a new logo, revamped website, an updated iOS app and a new Android app. In October 2016, SuperGroup chief operating officer Susanne Given joined the company as the non-executive chair.

In July 2017, Push Doctor raised a further $26.1m in Series B funding, taking the company's total funding to $37.5m. In August 2017, Push Doctor introduced a £500 medical student grant, which is open to medical students at any UK university from their second year onwards. Ozagir said the move would "help the next generation of home-grown doctors get off to the best possible start." In August 2018, Eren Ozagir stepped down as CEO of Push Doctor but remains a shareholder."

In June 2017, the Care Quality Commission (CQC) found Push Doctor to be providing caring and responsive service, that fell short in areas of safety, effectiveness and leadership. The Commission suggested that Push Doctor were prescribing high-risk medicines to patients without performing essential checks, and in one case had prescribed a medication for a use beyond its stated license. Then-CEO Eren Ozagir claimed that there were factual inaccuracies in the CQC report, and that the guidelines against which the inspection took place were completely new.

In November 2017, the company failed a CQC inspection due to inadequate checks of users' ages and identities – which was then corrected in time for the August 2018 inspection, wherein the company was found to be overprescribing antibiotics.

The Modality Partnership started to offer online consultations using Push Doctor to more than 99,000 patients across six of the Modality practices in September 2018. If this is successful, it will be extended to all of their 400,000 patients.

In January 2021, Push Doctor was selected as the digital partner for GP practices in west London, supported by Hounslow and Richmond Community Healthcare (HRCH) NHS Trust. The partnership allows Push Doctor to allow more than 300,000 people across the borough to book appointments from their smartphones.

In February 2021 it formed a partnership with Well Pharmacy to launch what they called the country's first pharmacy-first digital service. Patients can conduct digital consultations with pharmacists. This was launched in the Plymouth Sound primary care network and in Warrington primary care network, where Well's clinical pharmacists work alongside GPs as part of an integrated practice team.

In November 2021 the CQC carried out a review of PushDoctor on 4 November 2021. They found no evidence that they need to carry out an inspection or reassess their rating of PushDoctor at this stage. The CQC continues to monitor data about PushDoctor and its services and will carry out a further inspection if they receive new information.

== Criticisms ==
The Advertising Standards Authority condemned a number of advertisements in April 2018 because they "misleadingly implied the advertised service was provided by the NHS and, as a result, that it was misleading because it did not make clear a cost was associated with the service." The ASA also said that the company practice of putting reviews on its website but omitting any that were unfavourable was misleading.

In July 2018, it was reported that Nicola Blackwood, the former minister for public health and innovation, had joined Push Doctor's advisory board. On reviewing the former MP's new role, the Advisory Committee on Business Appointments stated there was "some risk around the potential for [Blackwood] offering the company an unfair advantage as a result of her time in office".
