= Bestway Wholesale =

British food wholesale operator

Bestway Wholesale Holdings Limited
- Type: Subsidiary; Private Limited Company
- Industry: Retail catering
- Founded: 1976; 50 years ago
- Headquarters: England, UK
- Key people: Younus Sheikh (Chairman); Dawood Pervez (Managing Director)
- Products: Cash and carry depots Symbol group outlets
- Brands: Best-one; Costcutter; Bargain Booze; Wine Rack
- Parent: Bestway Group
- Website: www.bestwaywholesale.co.uk

Bestway Wholesale Holdings Limited is a British food and drink wholesale business founded in 1976 by Sir Anwar Pervez. The business operates wholesale cash and carry sites and delivery services and also supports independent retailers through several symbol retail brands.

== History ==
In 1976, Sir Anwar Pervez established Bestway's first wholesale warehouse in Acton, West London. The business subsequently expanded through additional warehouses and acquisitions.

Bestway Wholesale acquired Bashin Cash & Carry in 1984, Crown Crest Limited in 1987 and Link Cash & Carry in 1988.

In January 2005, Bestway Group Chief Executive Zameer Choudrey CBE led the acquisition of Batleys plc for £100 million.

Bestway Wholesale later expanded through acquisitions including Bellevue Cash & Carry, Martex Group and Sher Brothers.

In April 2018, the company purchased the assets and brands of Conviviality Retail from administrators PwC for £7.25 million.

In June 2018, the company acquired two Blakemore Wholesale warehouses in Cardiff and Walsall.

In December 2020, Bestway acquired symbol operator Costcutter Supermarkets Group for an undisclosed fee from Bibby Line Group.

In January 2021, Bestway Wholesale introduced two new symbol group off-licence brands, Tippl and BB's.

In February 2022, Bestway Wholesale Managing Director Dawood Pervez indicated that the company was considering consolidating its symbol groups under Best-one, Costcutter, Bargain Booze and Wine Rack.

In August 2023, Bestway Wholesale re-branded the 22 Batleys sites under its own name.

=== 2025 anniversary and Sir Anwar Pervez's 90th birthday ===
In July 2025, Bestway Group marked its 50th anniversary at a celebration at the Royal Albert Hall, which also marked the 90th birthday of founder Sir Anwar Pervez. The event brought together around 800 guests, including senior politicians, diplomats and figures from the grocery, pharmacy and finance sectors.

The event celebrated Bestway Group's development since its founding in 1976, when it began as a single convenience store in West London. The group had subsequently grown into a family-owned business with an annual turnover of more than £5 billion. Bestway Wholesale was described by Pharmacy Business as the UK's largest independent cash and carry operator.

The group's healthcare interests include Well Pharmacy, which Bestway Group launched after purchasing the Co-operative Group's pharmacy business. Pharmacy Business reported that Well Pharmacy had 750 branches and employed more than 7,000 people in the UK.

Bestway's pharmaceutical wholesale operation was reported to be the UK's fourth-largest pharmaceutical wholesaler, supplying its own branches, more than 360 care homes and more than 5,500 independent pharmacies from five depots. Its Healthcare Service Centre in Stoke-on-Trent was reported to handle more than 100 million items annually.

The event also highlighted the work of the Bestway Foundation. Pharmacy Business reported that the foundation had donated more than £50 million to causes involving health, education and social mobility. It also supports more than 3,000 university students each year and provides free healthcare to 35,000 people.

== Operations ==
Bestway Wholesale operates across the UK through wholesale, foodservice, delivery and symbol-group businesses.

Current operations
Name	Description
Bargain Booze	A symbol group of independent off-licence stores in the United Kingdom.
BB Foodservice	A food catering delivery service in the United Kingdom.
Best-one	A symbol group of independent convenience stores in the United Kingdom.
Bestpets	A trade-only supplier of pet products in the United Kingdom.
Bestway Export	A wholesaler of British products around the world.
Bestway Wholesale	A cash and carry and delivery business in the United Kingdom.
Costcutter	A symbol group of independent convenience stores in the United Kingdom.
Wine Rack	A symbol group of independent off-licence stores in the United Kingdom.

== See also ==
- Bestway
