= Zameer Choudrey, Baron Choudrey =

British-Pakistani businessman (born 1958)

The Right Honourable The Lord Choudrey CBE SI Pk
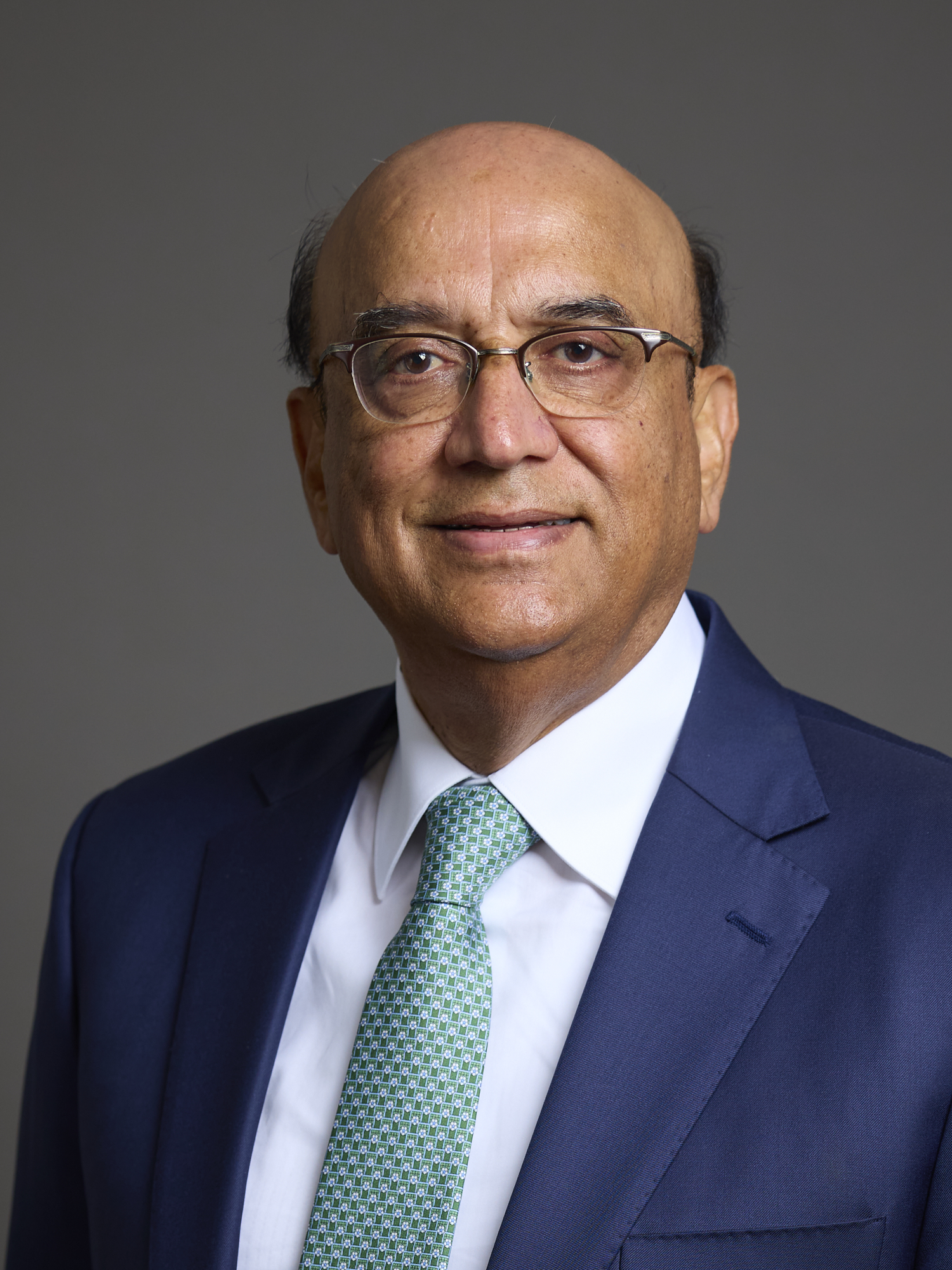
- Official portrait, 2024

Member of the House of Lords
- Lord Temporal
- Life peerage 9 October 2019

Personal details
- Born: Zameer Mohammed Choudrey; 23 March 1958 (age 68) Islamabad, Pakistan
- Citizenship: United Kingdom and Pakistan
- Spouse: Rakshanda
- Relations: Sir Anwar Pervez (uncle)
- Education: University of Kent
- Known for: CEO, Bestway

Zameer Mohammed Choudrey, Baron Choudrey CBE SI Pk (Urdu: ضمیر چوہدری; born 23 March 1958) is a British-Pakistani businessman who is the chief executive of the multinational conglomerate Bestway.

According to the Sunday Times Rich List UK, in 2020 his net worth is £1.53 billion, making him the second-richest Pakistani in the UK.

== Early life ==
Choudrey was born in March 1958. His parents hail from a remote village of Thathi in Gujar Khan, Pakistan. He moved to UK at the age of 12 with his family. He graduated from the University of Kent at Canterbury in 1981.

== Career ==
In 1984, Choudrey qualified as an accountant with Simmons, Cohen, Fine and Partners (now Simmons Gainsford LLP). He is a Fellow of the Institute of Chartered Accountants in England and Wales and is also a member of the Institute of Directors in London. In November 2014 he received an honorary doctorate from the University of Kent.

He joined Bestway Group in 1984 as Financial Controller; he played a key role in the expansion of the Group's wholesale business through the acquisition of Bashin Cash & Carry in 1984, Crown Crest Limited in 1987 and Link Cash & Carry in 1988.

In 1990, Choudrey was appointed the finance director of Bestway Group. During the mid 1990s he was assigned the task of business diversification by the board of directors and in 1995 he was appointed chief executive of Bestway Cement.

In October 2002, having led the acquisition of United Bank Limited (UBL), he was appointed to the board of UBL. Since then he has been a director of UBL Insurers.

In July 2014 under his leadership Bestway Group acquired the Co-op's pharmacy business for £620 million or US$1.06 billion. The Co-operative Pharmacy was the UK's third largest independent pharmacy business and the largest in Wales. The business has since been re-named Well Pharmacy.

== Philanthropy ==
In 1987, Choudrey was a founding Trustee of Bestway Foundation – a charitable trust of the Bestway Group that works exclusively in the health and education sectors.

In 1997 Bestway Foundation Pakistan was established and he was appointed Chairman of Bestway Foundation Pakistan.

Between 2008 and 2010 he served as Chairman of NGBF Trading Limited – the trading arm of GroceryAid.

In April 2009 he joined the Board of Trustees of Crimestoppers UK.

Between March 2010 and April 2019, Choudrey served as a trustee of GroceryAid - the trade industry's flagship charity.

In May 2010, he was appointed as Deputy chairman of the Pakistan Britain Trade & Investment Forum.

He became a member of HRH Prince of Wales Pakistan Recovery Fund International Leadership Team in 2011.

In April 2013 Choudrey was invited by the British Asian Trust to join their UK Advisory Council.

In January 2018 he was appointed UK Chair of the British Asian Trust's Advisory Council.

In June 2019, Choudrey joined the Commonwealth Enterprise & Investment Council's Advisory Council.

== Politics ==
Choudrey is a long-standing supporter and donor to the UK Conservative Party, and in August 2013 was appointed the co-chairman of the Conservative Friends of Pakistan.

He made his maiden speech in the House of Lords on 29 January 2020; when he participated in the House of Lords debate on the Sutton Trust's Mobility Manifesto, published in November 2019, and the recommendations of the Social Mobility Commission's 2019 State of the Nation report.

In June 2020, during the House of Lords debate - the economic lessons learned from the COVID-19 pandemic and the measures necessary to repair the UK economy - he asked if the Government intended to expand the life insurance scheme to the SME sector, and specifically to BAME individuals employed in the SME sector who have been defined as key workers but are not covered by the current scheme.

In May 2021, whilst participating in the debate on Her Majesty the Queen's Speech, he highlighted the issues being faced by community pharmacists.

== Honours ==
In October 2015, he was declared the winner of the Grocer Cup for outstanding business achievement.

He was appointed Commander of the Order of the British Empire (CBE) in the 2016 New Year Honours for services to the wholesale industry and charity.

On 23 March 2018, the president of Pakistan awarded him Sitara-i-Imtiaz (Star of Excellence) SI Pk, in recognition of his contributions to advancing Pakistan through his services and the wide array of philanthropic work.

He was nominated for a life peerage in the 2019 Prime Minister's Resignation Honours. He was created Baron Choudrey, of Hampstead in the London Borough of Barnet, on 9 October 2019. He formally joined the House of Lords on 5 November.

== See also ==
- Pakistan United Kingdom relations

Orders of precedence in the United Kingdom
Preceded by The Lord Parkinson of Whitley Bay	Gentlemen; Baron Choudrey	Followed by The Lord Brownlow of Shurlock Row
