= Fresh Express =

Fresh Express may refer to:

- FreshXpress, a UK supermarket chain
- Fresh Express, a fresh salad subsidiary of Chiquita Brands International
- Ellie Mae Classic, or Fresh Express Classic, a golf tournament in Hayward, California, U.S.

== See also ==
- Fresh expression, a movement in the Christian church
