= Bestway Cement =

Pakistani cement manufacturer

- Native name: بیسٹ وے سیمنٹ
- Type: Public
- Traded as: PSX: BWCL; KSE 100 component
- Industry: Cement
- Founded: 1993; 33 years ago
- Headquarters: Islamabad, Pakistan
- Key people: Zameer Choudrey, Baron Choudrey (CEO)
- Revenue: ▲ Rs. 103.922 billion (US$370 million) (2024)
- Operating income: ▲ Rs. 28.223 billion (US$100 million) (2024)
- Net income: ▲ Rs. 13.768 billion (US$49 million) (2024)
- Total assets: ▼ Rs. 167.909 billion (US$600 million) (2024)
- Total equity: ▲ Rs. 63.059 billion (US$230 million) (2024)
- Owner: Bestway International Holdings Limited, Guernsey (56.43%); Rizwan Pervez (6.79%); Dawood Pervez (6.30%); Bestway Foundation (3.91%)
- Number of employees: 1,979 (2024)
- Parent: Bestway Group
- Website: bestway.com.pk
- Footnotes; Financials as of 30 June 2024

Bestway Cement Limited is a Pakistani cement manufacturer based in Islamabad. It is a subsidiary of British conglomerate Bestway Group.

It was founded in 1993 and is listed on the Pakistan Stock Exchange.

== History ==
=== 1995–2005: Early history ===
Bestway Cement was incorporated by Bestway Group of the United Kingdom in December 1993. The company built its first cement plant in Hattar, in the Khyber Pakhtoonkhwa in 1995 with an initial investment of US$120 million. Civil works started in January 1996 and the Kiln was fired in April 1998.

In 2001, Bestway was listed on the Karachi Stock Exchange. A year later, the plant's capacity was further enhanced to 1.3 million TPA at a cost of US$20 million.

In February 2004, Bestway set up its second plant with a 1.8 million TPA capacity in Chakwal, Punjab with a total investment of US$140 million. Civil works for Bestway Chakwal-I were initiated in January 2005, the kiln was fired in May 2006 and the plant went into production in June 2006. The local people claim that Bestway Group did not fairly compensate the previous owners of the land. A case was brought against Bestway Group and is pending in the Supreme Court of Pakistan.

=== 2005–present: Acquisitions and growth ===
In September 2005, Bestway bid for 85.29% of the equity of Mustehkam Cement Limited under the Privatization Scheme and acquired the company for $70.0 million. The deal was spearheaded by Choudrey and became its third cement plant. In the post acquisition period the Group has invested in excess of US$50 million.

In June 2008, Bestway's fourth cement plant with a 1.8 million TPA capacity went into commercial production adjacent to the existing site in Chakwal at a cost of US$180 million.

In 2010, the production capacity of the former Mustehkam Cement Limited plant was further enhanced to 1.1 million tonnes per annum at a total cost of US$70.0 million which was ultimately merged with Bestway Cement in 2013.

In July 2014, Bestway acquired Lafarge's 75.86 percent stake in Lafarge Pakistan Cement Ltd for an enterprise value of US$329 million (€244 million). Lafarge Pakistan Cement Ltd operated a cement plant in the north of Pakistan which was established as Chakwal Cement, but was later acquired by Orascom in 2005, an Egyptian conglomerate, which renamed it as Pakistan Cement Limited. Pakistan Cement Limited became part of Lafarge in 2008 when it acquired Orascom's cement operations worldwide. Bestway also acquired another 12.07% shares through a public offer, taking its shareholding in Lafarge Pakistan to 87.93%.

In April 2015, Bestway invested US$30 million to build WHRP plant at Pakcem. In July 2015, the company inaugurated two WHRP Plants (6 MW and 7.5 MW) at its Hattar and Farooqia plants in KPK Province of Pakistan.

In March 2017, Bestway announced plans to set up its third cement plant in Haripur KPK Province. A year later, Bestway expanded its capacity by 1.8 million tons.

In May 2021, Bestway announced it will establish greenfield plant in Mianwali having capacity of 7,200 tons. It will include a 9MW waste heat recovery plant. In June 2021, Bestway commissioned its first 14.3MW captive solar power unit at its integrated cement plant at Farooqia, Khyber Pakhtunkhwa. The unit is part of a 50MW project deal that is planned to install solar units at the cement producer's plant at Farooqia, Chakwal, Kallar Kahar and Hattar in Pakistan.
