= Dawood Pervez =

British chief executive

- Born: 1975 (age 50–51)
- Education: Eton College; University of Oxford
- Occupation: Businessman
- Title: MD, Bestway Wholesale
- Spouse: Clare
- Children: 2
- Parent: Anwar Pervez

Dawood Pervez (born 1975) is a British businessman. Since 2018, he has been the managing director of Bestway Wholesale. In 2012, he received the Queen's Award for Enterprise in International Trade.

== Early life ==
Pervez is the son of Bestway founder, Sir Anwar Pervez.

Pervez attended Eton College, and studied law at the University of Oxford.

== Career ==
Pervez's family started "a single shop in Earls Court" in 1963, which was then renamed to Bestway in 1976. As a child, Pervez frequently observed and assisted his father, Bestway founder Sir Anwar Pervez, and took various jobs in the company while growing up.

After graduating from Oxford, Pervez worked at Linklaters, with a concentration in international mergers and acquisitions, before returning to Bestway in 2002 in a legal capacity. He subsequently worked in human resources and portfolio management. In 2004, he was named to the company's board of directors.

In 2018, Pervez became the managing director of Bestway Wholesale.

In 2020, Pervez was named a trustee of GroceryAid. In 2022, he became the two-year chairman of the Federation of Wholesale Distributors after having served as a council member since 2018.

== Personal life ==
Pervez is married to Clare, they have two children and live in Gerrards Cross.
