= Our Health Partnership =

Our Health Partnership is a large provider of primary care services in Birmingham and Shropshire established in November 2015.

Our Health Partnership is one of the UK’s biggest general practitioner partnerships. It brings together 47 surgeries in the Midlands and Shropshire. It is described as a super-partnership which will generate efficiencies of scale when compared with traditional general practice in the UK. It claims that the constituent practices will retain their own operational autonomy.

The partnership is proposing to lead primary care networks across the country including practices not in their organisation.

== The Board ==
The board is made up of nine elected general practitioner partners – seven from Birmingham and two from Shropshire, an appointed practice manager and an operations director and finance director. It is also supported by an external strategic advisor. The board is responsible for the central functions, including accounting, human resources, finance and quality (including a care quality commission).

The chair is Dr Vish Ratnasuriya MBE, a general practice partner at Lordswood House Medical Practice in Harborne.
