= Khushhali Microfinance Bank =

Bank of Pakistan

- Type: Unlisted public company
- Industry: Microfinance
- Founded: 2000; 26 years ago
- Founder: Government of Pakistan
- Headquarters: Islamabad, Pakistan
- Key people: Aameer Karachiwalla (President/CEO)
- Products: Loans; Savings; Consumer Banking
- Revenue: ▼ Rs. 6.358 billion (US$23 million) (2023)
- Net income: ▼ Rs. −5.957 billion (US$−21 million) (2023)
- Total assets: ▼ Rs. 115.121 billion (US$410 million) (2023)
- Total equity: ▼ Rs. 3.716 billion (US$13 million) (2023)
- Owner: United Bank Limited (27.82%)
- Website: khushhalibank.com.pk
- Footnotes; Financials as of 31 December 2023

Khushhali Bank Limited is a Pakistani microfinance bank headquartered in Islamabad. It is the largest microfinance lender in Pakistan.

== History ==
Khushhali Bank was founded in 2000 by the Government of Pakistan and was developed with the funding from the Asian Development Bank.

In 2024, Federal Ombudsman Secretariat for Protection Against Harassment (FOSPAH) ruled against the bank and a number of its employees, in a harassment case filed by a female employee of the bank.
