= Modality Partnership =

English GP partnership

The Modality Partnership is a large GP partnership formed in 2009. Such large practices are often described as a "super partnership". According to the King's Fund in 2016 it was one of England’s largest super-practices. In 2018 it had about 400,000 patients and was thought to be the largest practice in England.

In September 2023 Modality Mid Sussex was placed in Special Measures after a report by the CQC. The CQC committed to a reassessment in March 2024 which did not take place. Residents experience major problems with many trying to contact Modality for months yet not being able to get an appointment.

== Past Recognition ==
The partnership was given a favourable mention in 2014 in the NHS Five Year Forward View. It already conducts 80% of consultations remotely using phone or Skype.

Sarb Basi, the managing director, said in response to the NHS Five Year Forward View that it would be a “natural, logical progression” to manage capitated budgets for health and social care budgets through an integrated care organisation, building a "coherent strategic partnership" with an acute hospital and working with community health trusts to incorporate nursing and therapy services. This appeared to connect with comments made by Simon Stevens to the House of Commons health select committee in October 2014 that he envisaged in Birmingham two large groupings of GPs - the Vitality Partnership and another which would employ geriatricians.

It is suggested that under Simon Stevens' plan large primary care organisations like Modality could be in a position to challenge the dominance of NHS hospital trusts It has extended the primary care services to include urology, dermatology, rheumatology and x-rays.

David Cameron cited the partnership in May 2015 when he praised Birmingham's transformation of primary care.

It signed an agreement with Sandwell and West Birmingham Hospitals NHS Trust in November 2017 which was a “commitment to work collaboratively over the next three to five years with a view to forming a much more vertically integrated relationship”.

Nick Harding, one of the co-founders, and chair of Sandwell and West Birmingham Clinical Commissioning Group was reckoned by the Health Service Journal to be the 47th most influential person in the English NHS in 2015.

== Expansion ==
In April 2017 it took over four more GP practices in Hull, with 48,000 patients, bringing its total list to 150,000. In June 2017 it took on Wokingham Medical Centre, its 27th practice, with 20,000 patients. In September 2017 it took over six GP practices in Airedale, Wharfedale and Craven, bringing its list to more than 200,000 patients. It took over three practices based in Lewisham in July 2018.

The partnership started to offer online consultations using Push Doctor to more than 99,000 patients across six of the Modality practices in September 2018. If this is successful it will be extended to all their 400,000 patients.

It proposes to run the bank and back office services for new primary care networks in England which include its practices, and is already doing so in Walsall.

== Performance ==
It had the largest pay gap between male and female employees (60.7%) of 154 companies based in Birmingham in 2018/19.

In July 2019 it announced it would have to close one of the five GP surgeries it runs in Hull because of staffing difficulties.

After activity surged in the wake of the COVID-19 pandemic in England the group found that its GPs had an average of nearly 50 patient contacts per day - around double what the British Medical Association says is the “safety limit". Average time per consultation had risen from 12 minutes in 2020 to 15 minutes in 2021, with a lot more mental health concerns.
