= FreshXpress =

Discount supermarket

- Type: Supermarket
- Industry: Retail
- Predecessor: Kwik Save
- Founded: February 2007
- Defunct: January 2009
- Fate: Administration
- Headquarters: Warrington, Cheshire
- Number of locations: 1 store (at final closure)
- Key people: Brendan Murtagh
- Products: Groceries
- Number of employees: 130
- Parent: FX Holdings
- Website: FreshXpress official website (Web Archive)

FreshXpress was a discount supermarket chain in the United Kingdom. It was originally formed in 2007, from the rump of the defunct Kwik Save chain, by Irish retail entrepreneur Brendan Murtagh.

It existed in its original form between July 2007 and March 2008, culminating in it going into administration. It was then resurrected in a smaller form, however, during 2009, the resurrected company also went into administration. It has since ceased to exist.

== History ==
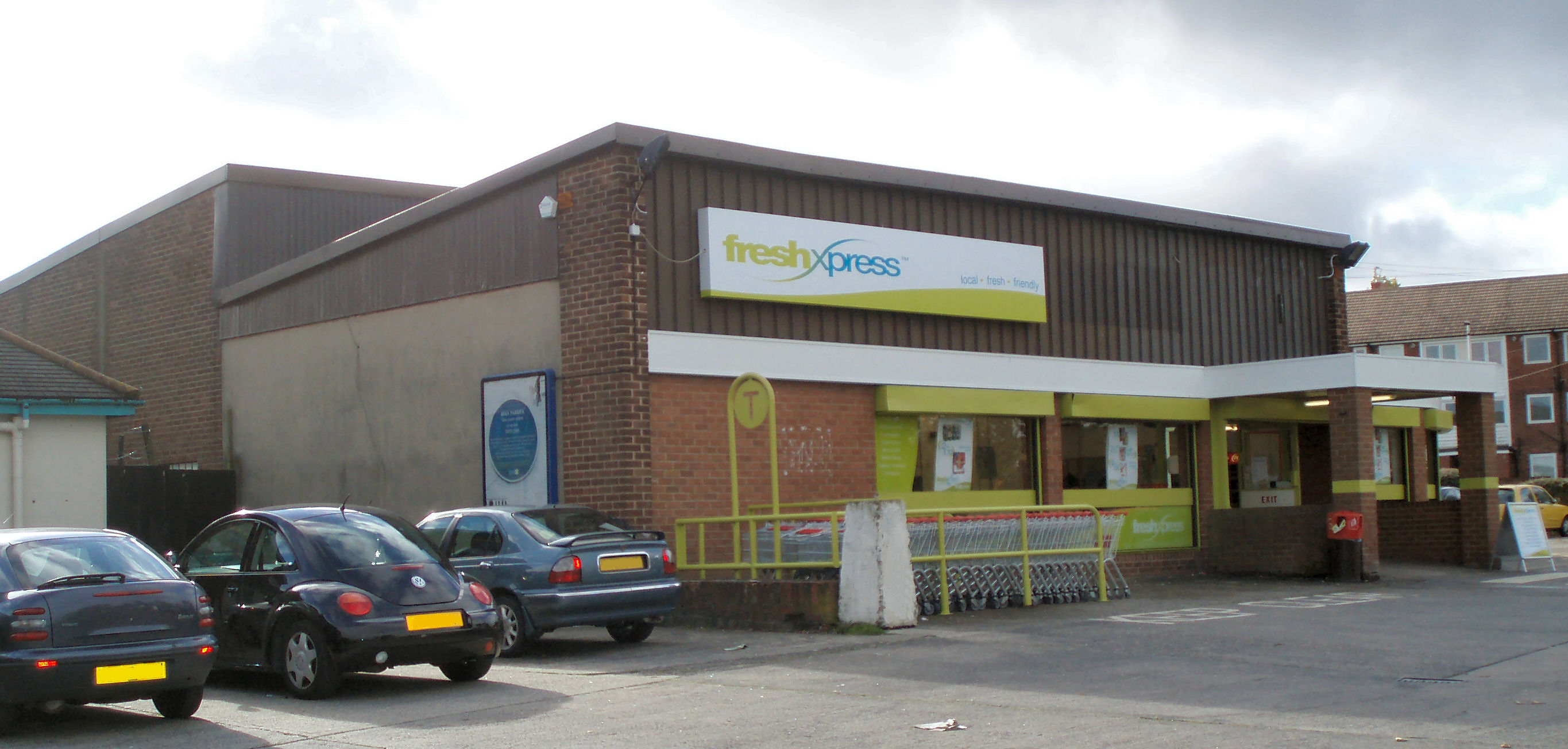
FreshXpress Fawdon, Newcastle upon Tyne, a typical style of FreshXpress store inherited from Kwik Save, this store has since been demolished and a new Netto store built, now an ASDA.

In February 2007, Brendan Murtagh and his son Alan Murtagh, major shareholders in the County Cavan-based Kingspan building materials group, backed 70% of a £50 million rescue plan for Kwik Save, with the Kwik Save managing director, Paul Niklas, covering the remaining 30%. Murtagh's son Alan Murtagh had already been a director of the business before he got involved.

On 6 July 2007, Kwik Save collapsed into administration, selling fifty-six of its remaining stores over to the Murtaghs. The deal formed a new company, FreshXPress, in an £18m deal, saving around six hundred jobs. The FreshXpress stores officially opened on 21 July 2007. Prodo and The Think Tank assisted with the creation of the new brand. A majority of FreshXpress stores were leased from the Somerfield group, the previous owners of Kwik Save.

In September, the chain closed more than half its stores, with only twenty-three remaining in operation. The retailer sold the leases to Tesco, Sainsbury's, and The Co-Operative Food due to underperformance. By March 2008, this was reduced further to just nine stores, and Mr Niklas cut his ties with the company. The chain collapsed into administration in the same month, with David Whitehouse, of Menzies Corporate Restructuring, appointed joint administrator. Another vehicle called FX Holdings (formerly Ivybrim), received the go-ahead at Manchester Crown Court to acquire the remaining operating outlets. Andrew King, a former executive at Costcutter, one of the company's suppliers, was to head up a nine-store chain with 130 employees.

The restructuring failed to save the retailer from further financial issues; Andrew King departed as CEO and was replaced with Trevor Ferringno, who stated that the stores were not making enough money. By November, only four stores remained, and three of those closed throughout the month, leaving only the St Helens store operating. on 10 January 2009, it was announced that the store would close the following week, and would be sold to a major competitor, while the rest of the business would be wound up in the next few weeks.
