= Well Pharmacy =

British pharmacy company

Well
- Type: Subsidiary undertaking
- Industry: Retail, pharmaceuticals, healthcare, beauty
- Headquarters: Manchester, England, UK
- Area served: United Kingdom
- Key people: Greg Pateras, CEO
- Number of employees: Circa 7,000
- Parent: Bestway Group
- Subsidiaries: Bestway Medhub; Well Careplus
- Website: www.well.co.uk

Well, is the second largest overall pharmacy chain after the company Boots in the United Kingdom. It is the largest pharmacy chain in Wales. It is owned by the conglomerate Bestway.

The Co-operative Group, the previous owners of the chain, announced in July 2014 that they had come to an agreement to divest their pharmacy business to the Bestway Group for £620 million. The sale was completed in October 2014 and Bestway was given a licence to continue using the Co-operative brand for 12 months. In 2015, Bestway began to rebrand the company as Well.

Other retail co-operatives in the United Kingdom, such as Midcounties Co-operative, continued to operate Co-op Pharmacy branded stores, and these were not affected by the sale.

== History ==
=== The Co-operative Pharmacy ===
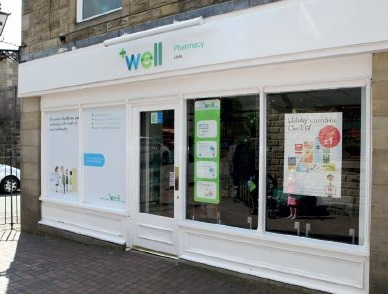
Well Pharmacy Store

The Co-operative Pharmacy was previously the trading name of National Co-operative Chemists, part of Co-operative Group Healthcare based in Rochdale, and Belfast Co-operative Chemists, a wholly owned subsidiary operating in Northern Ireland. Established in 1945, National Co-operative Chemists traded in areas without a regional society pharmacy, although some independent societies (such as The Midcounties Co-operative) also operated their own in-house chemists under The Co-operative Pharmacy brand after it was introduced in 2007.

In 2001, The Co-operative Pharmacy pioneered the use of Braille on the packaging of own label medicines and, in 2012, it became the first retail pharmacy chain in the UK to become carbon neutral.

The Co-operative Doctor was an online diagnosis and treatment system. In 2011, The Co-operative Pharmacy teamed up with The-Clinic.com to provide clinical and medical input. The-Clinic.com’s medical services were provided by Freedom Health, which is registered with the Healthcare Commission.

In February 2014, after suffering a £2.5bn loss for 2013, The Co-operative Group announced that it was to start exploring options to sell their pharmacy business along with other businesses in their portfolio.

=== Bestway Group ===
The Co-operative Group agreed to divest the business to the Bestway Group for £620 million in July 2014. The sale was completed in October 2014 and Bestway were given a licence to continue using the Co-operative brand for 12 months. At the time of the acquisition Bestway Group Chief Executive Zameer Choudrey said: "We see great potential to grow the business organically and through future acquisitions".

On 10 February 2015 during an event held in Birmingham, it was announced that "Well Pharmacy" would become the new brand for the pharmacy business and that all 780 branches would have all reference to The Co-operative Pharmacy removed and replaced with Well by the end of October 2015. Chourdey had pledged to give Well strong support by committing to invest £200m over the next five years to help develop and grow the business.

In October 2015, George Osborne performed a formal opening of the Well Pharmacy head office in Manchester.

== Services ==
Well Pharmacy is the UK's third largest pharmacy business overall, with 794 stores nationwide across the UK and Northern Ireland as of 2018.

It launched an online NHS prescription service in July 2018. By January 2019, 25,184 patients had signed up.

In February 2021 it formed a partnership with Push Doctor to launch what they called the country’s first pharmacy-first digital service. Patients can conduct digital consultations with pharmacists. This was launched in the Plymouth Sound primary care network and in Warrington primary care network, where Well’s clinical pharmacists work alongside GPs as part of an integrated practice team.

== Data breach ==
In late 2018, Well Pharmacy had a data breach leaking the personal information of 24,000 employees. It reportedly launched a full investigation of the data breach, which occurred due to an operating error, resulting in the distribution of an email containing personal information to various locums on 11 December 2018.
