= Best-one =

Convenience store chain in the UK

Best-One Shops Ltd

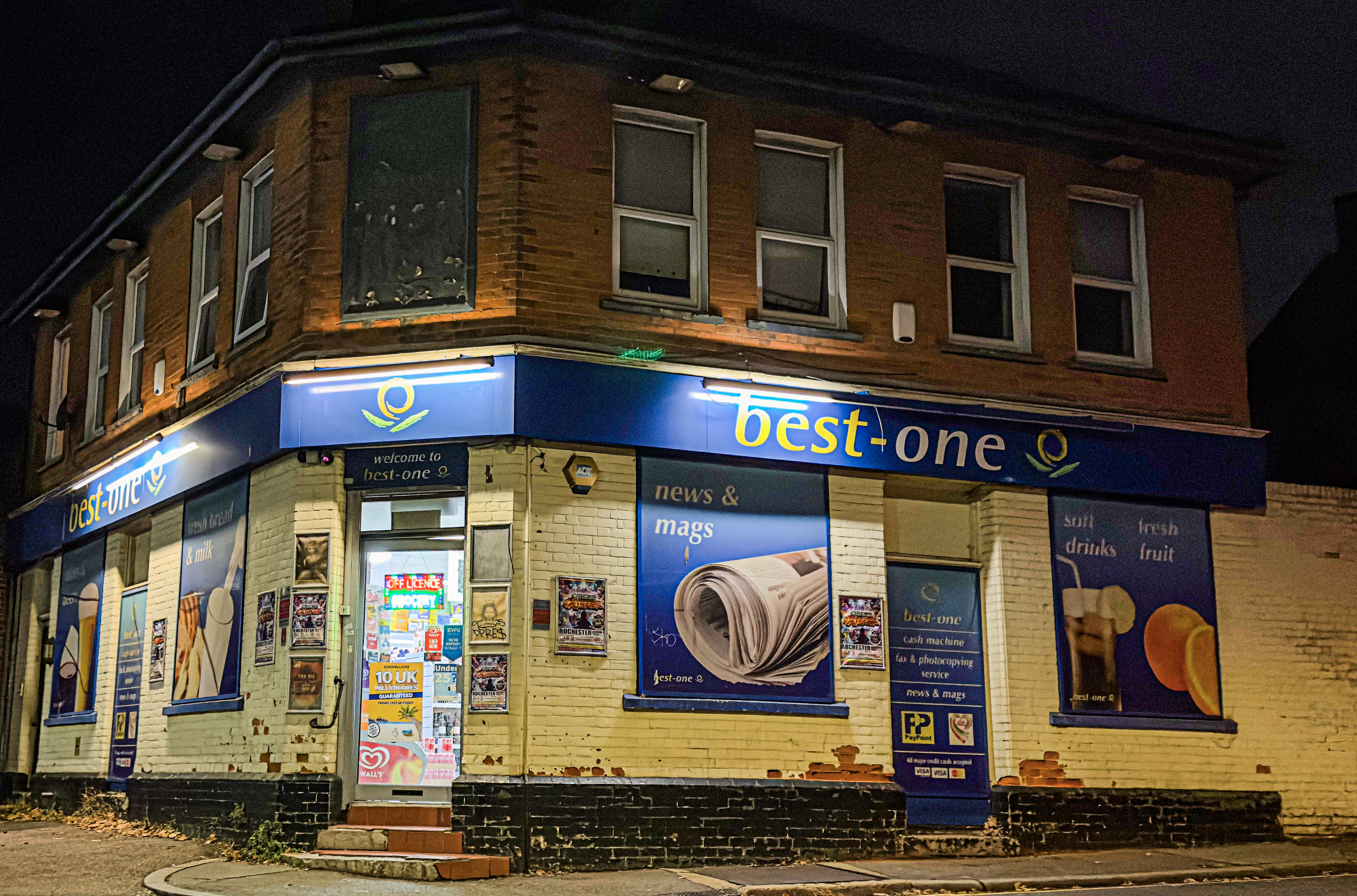
- A shop in Kent, England
- Type: Private
- Industry: Retail
- Founded: 1990
- Headquarters: Park Royal, London
- Key people: Bharat Dhand, Veena Dhand
- Products: Food
- Parent: Bestway Wholesale
- Website: best-one.co.uk

Best-one (stylized as best-one) is a symbol group (a type of retail franchise) in the United Kingdom and Jersey, Channel Islands. The franchise has over 2000 shops throughout the United Kingdom as of January 2022. Most shops are owned on a franchise basis and most stock is sourced through Bestway Cash & Carry. The organisation's flagship shop, a 3,000 sq ft (280m^{2}) outlet in London Docklands, provides a more upmarket offering to customers who work in the financial services sector at Canary Wharf.

Best-one as part of Bestway Wholesale is a segment of the Bestway group.
