= Bestway =

British multinational conglomerate company

Bestway Group Limited
- Type: Private
- Industry: Conglomerate
- Founded: 1976; 50 years ago
- Founder: Sir Anwar Pervez
- Headquarters: London, England, UK
- Key people: Anwar Pervez (Chairman); Zameer Choudrey CBE (CEO) Younus Sheikh (Chairman)
- Products: Wholesale; Cement; Banking; Pharmacy; Property
- Revenue: £4.51 billion (2022)
- Net income: £398.8 million (2022)
- Owner: Pervez, Sheikh, & Choudrey families.
- Number of employees: 28,000 (2022)
- Website: www.bestwaygroup.co.uk

Bestway Group Limited is a British conglomerate founded by Sir Anwar Pervez in 1976. The group operates in the United Kingdom and Pakistan, and is currently based in London.

The group began as Bestway Wholesale. The group formed property firm Palmbest in 1990, and Bestway Cement in 1995. In 2002, the group acquired a minority share in United Bank in Pakistan and later became its majority shareholder. In 2015, the group founded Well Pharmacy in Britain, and in 2023 acquired a minority stake in the British supermarket chain Sainsbury's.

== History ==
Bestway Wholesale was established in 1976.

The Group set up its first Bestway Cement cement plant in 1995 in Hattar in the KP Province of Pakistan, with an initial investment of US$120.0 million. The plant's initial capacity was 0.99 million tonnes per annum, this was enhanced to 1.17 million tonnes per annum at a cost of US$10 million in 2002.

In October 2002 Bestway Group successfully bid for a controlling share in United Bank Limited (UBL). The total investment was approximately US$210 million.

Bestway Group expanded its cement operations in February 2004 by setting up a 1.8 million tonnes per annum cement plant in Chakwal, Punjab Province, Pakistan, at a cost of US$180.0 million.

To augment its presence in the cement industry, Bestway bid for 85.29% equity of Mustehkam Cement Limited. The company's bid of approximately US$70 million was accepted in September 2005. The plant started production in December 2005 just one month after acquisition.

In 2005, the Group acquired its wholesale rival, Batley's plc.

In 2010 it purchased the Scottish cash and carry company Bellevue and Martex.

In July 2014 Bestway Group acquired the Co-operative Group's stores branded as The Co-operative Pharmacy, the UK's third largest pharmacy, for £620 million. They have since been re-branded as Well Pharmacy. At the time of acquisition, the pharmacy business was expected to increase the group's annual turnover to over £3 billion and the group's global workforce would increase to 33,600 people, with over 11,900 people employed in the UK.

In April 2018, Bestway acquired the Bargain Booze and Wine Rack brands for £7 million.

In December 2020 it was announced that Bestway would acquire the UK arm of Costcutter from Bibby Line. This acquisition gives Bestway 1,500 stores under multiple brand names including Costcutter, Co-Op, Kwiksave, Mace and Supershop.

In January 2023, it was announced Bestway Group Limited had acquired a 3.45% stake in the UK's second largest supermarket chain, Sainsbury's. A week later, in February 2023, it was announced the stake had been increased to 4.47%. In October 2023, this was further increased to 4.99%.

Bestway Group, the largest shareholder in the Pakistani bank United Bank Limited "UBL", submitted an "Indicative Offer" in September 2023 to acquire its 55% shareholding in its United Kingdom joint venture with the National Bank of Pakistan, United National Bank Limited "UNBL UK". This was approved by the Board of Directors of UBL but is conditional on the approval of the State Bank of Pakistan.

In 2024, the State Bank of Pakistan approved Silkbank’s merger with United Bank Limited (UBL). The process was finalized in March 2025, with Silkbank officially integrating into UBL through a share swap agreement.

In March 2024, Silkbank Limited announced its merger with United Bank Limited (UBL) after both banks reached an agreement. On March 10, 2025, the State Bank of Pakistan (SBP) officially sanctioned the amalgamation of Silkbank with UBL under Section 48 of the Banking Companies Ordinance 1962. The merger became effective on March 11, 2025, fully integrating Silkbank's operations into UBL. As part of the agreement, UBL issued new shares to Silkbank shareholders at a swap ratio of 1 UBL share (face value PKR 10 each) for every 325 Silkbank shares (face value PKR 10 each).

In October 2026, Bestway Group launched Bestway Automotive, the sole authorised distributor of Chinese automaker Geely Auto in Pakistan. The launch followed Bestway Group’s acquisition of Proton Holdings’ plant at Port Qasim, Karachi, for vehicle assembly. The launch featured three models: the Geely EX2, an electric subcompact hatchback; the Geely EX5, an electric compact SUV; and the Geely Starray EM-i, a range-extended electric compact crossover SUV.

== Investments ==
Bestway Group comprises the following investments:

Company	Sector	Ownership
Bestway Cement	Bestway Cement is the second largest cement-maker in Pakistan with a total capacity of more than 8 million tons per annum.	56.43%
Bestway Wholesale	Bestway Wholesale is the UK's second largest food wholesaler, serving 130,000 independent retailers and caterers from 62 warehouses nationwide. In turn it owns a number of symbol groups.	100%
Palmbest	A UK based property investment company. It comprises 72 assets which are mainly commercial, including 6 million sq ft of warehousing space, with more than 30 tenants. 56% of its properties are located in London and the South East and its portfolio is valued at £1 billion.	100%
Sainsbury's	The second largest supermarket chain in the United Kingdom.	4.99%
United Bank Limited	United Bank Limited is the third largest bank in Pakistan and has over 1,400 branches in Pakistan, a significant presence throughout the Middle East and representative offices in Beijing and Kazakhstan.	61.48%
Well Pharmacy	Well Pharmacy is the UK's third-largest pharmacy chain and is based in Manchester.	100%

== Bestway Foundation ==
In 1987 the Bestway Group established the Bestway Foundation. It is a charitable trust of the Bestway Group that works exclusively in the health and education sectors. Every year the Group contributes approximately 2.5% of its profit to the Foundation, which helps support charities and contributes to help the local community. In the last decade Bestway Foundation has invested in 35 inner city schools in as part of the Specialist Schools & Academies Program.

In 1997 Bestway Foundation Pakistan was established and Choudrey was appointed Chairman of Bestway Foundation Pakistan.

In February 2013, the Bestway Foundation and University of Bradford signed a five-year agreement that committed £250,000 each to jointly fund five annual scholarships to support postgraduate students applying from Pakistan.

In May 2014 Bestway Cement Limited was ranked 10th out of 478 PLCs by volume of donations in Pakistan according to Pakistan Centre for Philanthropy (PCP) Philanthropy Survey 2012.

In October 2014 Bestway Foundation (Rs. 50 Million) and United Bank Limited (Rs. 100 Million) donated Rs. 150 Million to Foreman Christian College Lahore, Pakistan. FC College which is one of the oldest academic institutions of South Asia was founded in 1864 by Dr Charles W Forman, a Presbyterian missionary from the United States of America.

In May 2015 the charitable trust gave £1 million towards graduate scholarships at Oxford University. The gift created an endowment that enables two graduate students from Pakistan per year to study at Oxford, in perpetuity, through the Oxford-Sir Anwar Pervez Graduate Scholarships.

In October 2016, the Bestway Foundation and University of Kent signed a five-year agreement that committed £250,000 each to jointly fund five annual scholarships to support postgraduate students applying from Pakistan.

In February 2017 the UK's third largest retail pharmacist, Well Pharmacy, launched its charity partnership with the Stroke Association. Well seeks to raise £250,000 under Know Your Blood Pressure campaign for the country's leading charity dedicated to conquering stroke.

In November 2017, the Bestway Foundation donated £100,000 NSPCC the children's charity.

In March 2018 Well Pharmacy donated over 35,000 Foster Grant sunglasses and reading glasses, with a total estimated retail value of £946,000 to In Kind Direct, which distributes consumer goods donated by companies to UK charities.

In November 2018; the Group's charitable trust donated £100,000 to the Great Ormond Street Children's Hospital.

In Pakistan the Group has donated £900,000 towards the construction of dams and large scale water Reservoirs.

The company has donated £14.8 million to the charitable trust in the UK and provided over US$9.0 million to health, education and humanitarian causes in Pakistan.

In November 2019, Bestway Foundation donated £100,000 to the Save The Children - a charity that Bestway's charitable trust has been supporting since 2004.

In April 2020 the Group companies in Pakistan donated Rs.600 million to fight COVID-19 in Pakistan.

In July 2021 the Bestway Foundation donated £975,000 to the Gonville & Caius College, University of Cambridge to establish a £1.3 million Lord Choudrey Scholarship Fund to provide scholarships for PhD students; named in honour of Lord Choudrey.

== Awards and nominations ==
In January 2013, Bestway was nominated for the Business of the Year award at the British Muslim Awards. The company is a longtime supporter of the UK Conservative Party.

== See also ==
- List of companies based in London
- Pakistan United Kingdom relations
