= Co-op Wholesale =

Wholesaler in the United Kingdom

Co-op Wholesale Limited
- Logo used since 2025
- Formerly: Northern Independent Supermarkets Association (Wholesale) Limited (1970–1979); Nisa Limited (1979–1989); Nisa-Today's Limited (1989–1992); Nisa-Today's (Holdings) Limited (1992–2012); Nisa Retail Limited (2012–2025)
- Type: Subsidiary
- Industry: Retail, wholesale
- Founded: 1977; 49 years ago
- Headquarters: Scunthorpe, Lincolnshire, United Kingdom
- Area served: UK
- Key people: Dudley Ramsden and Peter Garvin, Founders; Peter Batt, Managing Director
- Revenue: ▼£1.388 billion (2022)
- Number of employees: 213
- Parent: The Co-operative Group
- Website: www.coopwholesale.co.uk www.nisalocally.co.uk

Co-op Wholesale Limited (/ˈnaɪsə/ NY-sə; formerly Nisa Retail Limited, Nisa-Today's and Northern Independent Supermarkets Association) is a groceries wholesaler (or "symbol group") operating in the United Kingdom. It is a wholly owned subsidiary of the Co-operative Group, though itself not a cooperative.

The company helps people franchise their stores under the Co-op Food and Nisa brands.

== History ==
Nisa brand logo used since 2008

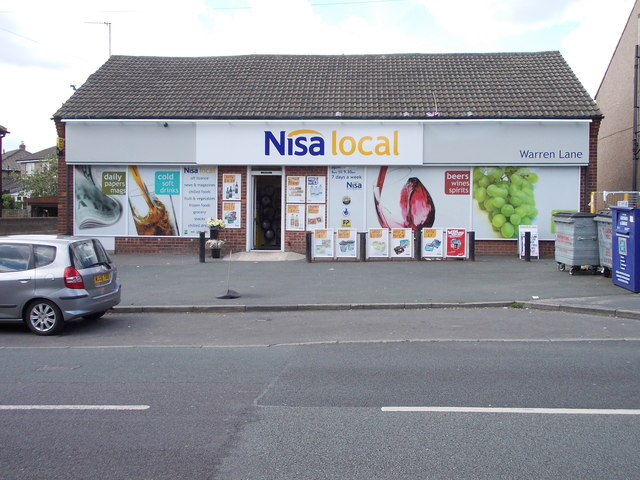
Nisa Local shop in Bingley in June 2012

Nisa was founded as the Northern Independent Supermarkets Association by Peter Garvin and Dudley B. Ramsden in 1977. It was formed as a mutual organisation owned by its members and operating "...like a co-operative, using the collective buying power of the large group of members to negotiate deals with suppliers".

In 1987, it merged with The Today's Group to become Nisa-Today's.

In 2006, a merger with Costcutter, another symbol group, was proposed, but ultimately fell through, after concerns about a cartel forming were reported to the Office of Fair Trading by members of Nisa-Today's who opposed the merger.

In 2012, Nisa-Today's demerged into Nisa and Today's Group. Today's Group subsequently merged with Landmark Wholesale in 2018 to form Unitas Wholesale.

Nick Read was appointed as Nisa CEO in February 2015, and began what The Grocer described as a "hard-fought turnaround".

In November 2017, Nisa's 1,190 members approved the purchase of the business by the Co-operative Group. The acquisition was subject to regulatory approval by the Competition and Markets Authority, and was finalized in May 2018. In 2019, Nisa recruited more than 500 stores, representing a 40% increase in the number of outlets being signed.

In March 2025, Nisa rebranded to Co-op Wholesale, the Nisa brand itself would continue to be used by Co-op Wholesale.

== Operations ==
Nisa's headquarters and one of its ambient distribution centres are co-located in Scunthorpe, North Lincolnshire. It also has distribution centres for temperature controlled products at Stoke-on-Trent, Staffordshire; Harlow, Essex and Livingston, West Lothian. Also at the co-op depot in Birtley, Tyne & Wear

Nisa logos

Nisa-Today's logo used from 2000s to 2008

Nisa-Today's logo used from 2008 to 2013

As of 2011, some stores are branded under the LoCo fascia.

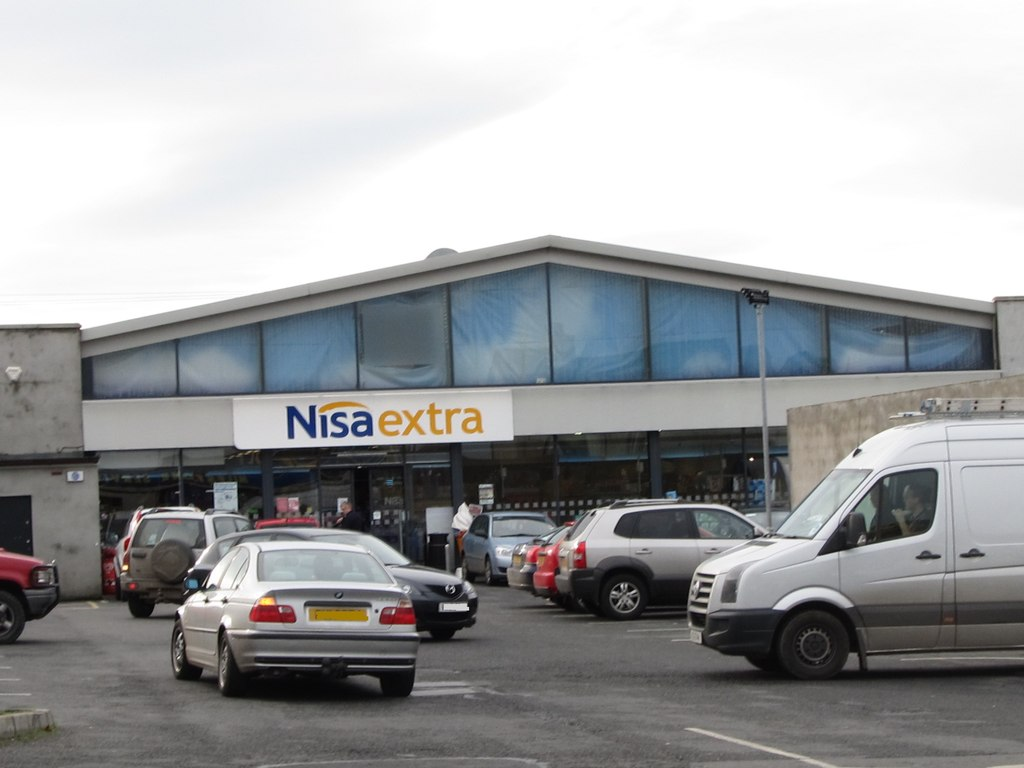
Nisa Extra shop in Rathfriland in October 2011

As of 2016, Nisa Retail Limited supplies over 4,000 convenience shops and small supermarkets, including the Costcutter symbol group and CK Foodstores in Wales. According to accounts for year ending on 31 March 2014, Nisa Retail Limited had an estimated net worth of £30.77 million.
