= United Bank Limited =

Pakistani commercial bank

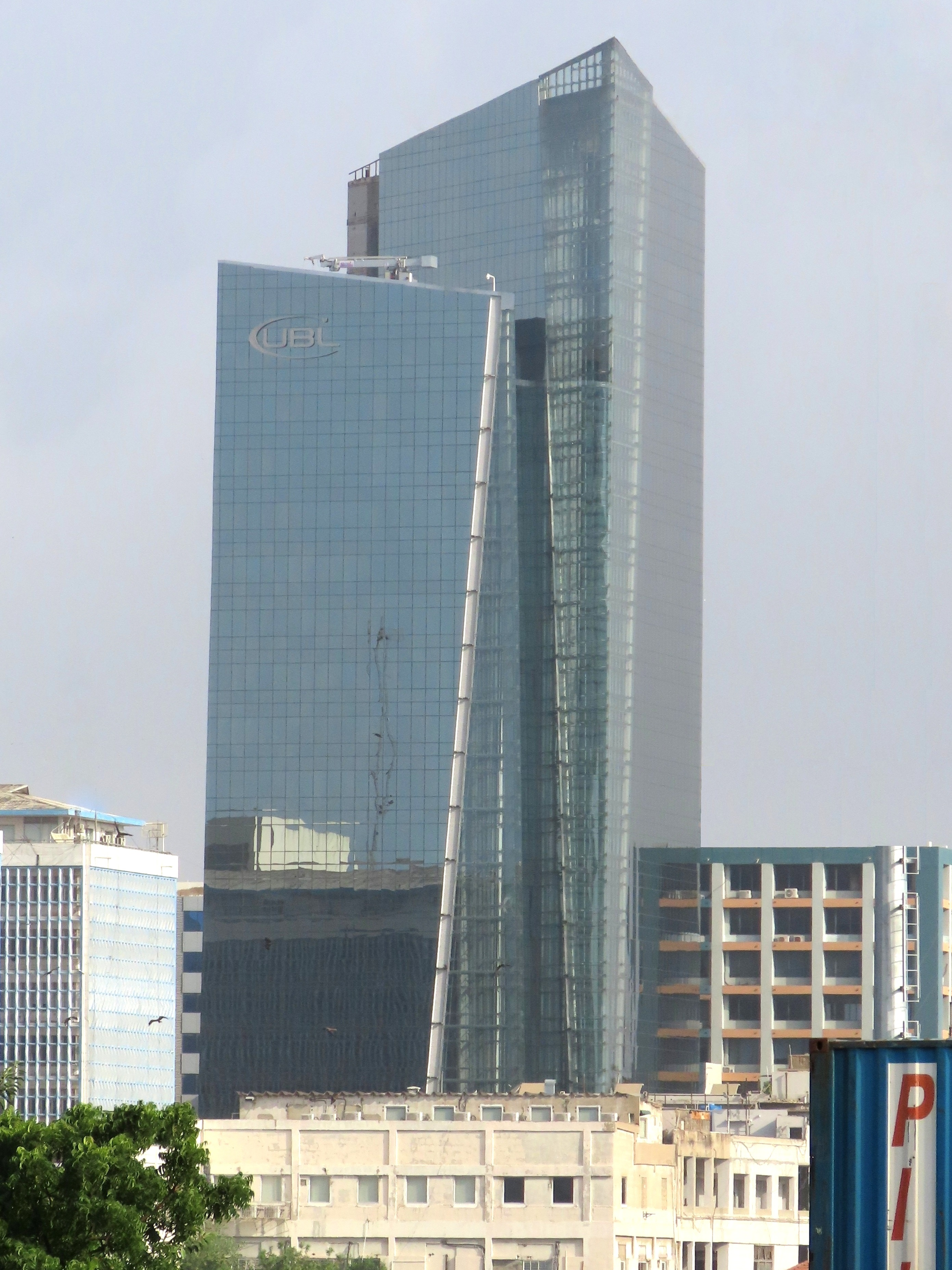
- United Bank Limited headquarters in Karachi
- Type: Public
- Traded as: PSX: UBL; KSE 100 component KSE 30 component
- Industry: Finance
- Founded: 7 November 1958; 68 years ago
- Founder: Agha Hasan Abedi
- Headquarters: Karachi-74000, Pakistan
- Key people: Muhammad Jawaid Iqbal CEO
- Products: Consumer Banking; Commercial banking; Islamic Banking; Priority banking; corporate banking; private banking; asset management
- Revenue: ▲ Rs. 419.56 billion (US$1.5 billion) (2025)
- Operating income: ▲ Rs. 288.27 billion (US$1.0 billion) (2025)
- Net income: ▲ Rs. 128.00 billion (US$460 million) (2025)
- Total assets: ▲ Rs. 12.62 trillion (US$45 billion) (2025)
- Total equity: ▲ Rs. 498.73 billion (US$1.8 billion) (2025)
- Owner: Bestway Group (60%)
- Number of employees: 26,921 (2024)
- Parent: Bestway Group
- Subsidiaries: UBL Currency Exchange; UBL Fund Managers Limited (98.87%); Al Ameen Financial Services (98.87%); UBL Insurers Limited (30%); Khushhali Microfinance Bank (27.82%)
- Website: ubldigital.com
- Footnotes; Financials as of 31 December 2025

United Bank Limited (often abbreviated as UBL) is a Pakistani bank headquartered at I.I. Chundrigar Road in Karachi. It is a subsidiary of British multinational conglomerate, Bestway Group. Founded by Agha Hasan Abedi in 1959, UBL saw its first branch open on I.I. Chundrigar Road in November of the same year. By 1960, the bank had additional branches in Lahore and Faisalabad (then Lyallpur), as well as Dhaka, Chittagong, and Narayanganj in what was then East Pakistan. The bank was nationalized by the Government of Pakistan in 1974 through the Banks Nationalization Act. The government sold its majority stake in 2002 to Abu Dhabi Group and Bestway Group who retain control to date as of 2025.

UBL is Pakistan's largest bank by market capitalization, third-largest by total assets, and fourth-largest by tier 1 capital. It is listed on the Pakistan Stock Exchange and has been designated as a domestic systemically important bank (D-SIB) by the State Bank of Pakistan.

== History ==
United Bank Limited was founded in November 1958 by a group of former Habib Bank Limited executives. In 1974, the Bhutto government nationalized the bank.

In 2002, the Government of Pakistan sold 51% of its shares of the bank to a consortium of Abu Dhabi Group and Bestway. In the same year, the bank merged its operations in the United Kingdom with those belonging to National Bank of Pakistan to form United National Bank Limited (later renamed UBL UK). United Bank owned 55% of the joint-venture with National Bank of Pakistan owning the remainder.

In 2005, UBL was listed on the Karachi Stock Exchange, following an initial public offering at a strike price of PKR 50. In June 2007 the Global Depository Receipts of UBL were listed on the London Stock Exchange. The offering targeted institutional investors and raised exceeding US$650 million. UBL is the only Pakistani bank and one of the only two Pakistani companies that are listed on the London Stock Exchange.

In April 2010, UBL launched UBL Omni, an in-house developed project designed to provide banking facilities to the unbanked population of Pakistan. As of June 2014 UBL Omni had a customer base exceeding 6.8 million, with over 1.5 million active cards in issue and 5 million monthly transactions valued at over US$253 million. Through the success of UBL Omni 1.55 million previously unbanked individuals have opened mobile bank accounts with UBL in Pakistan. Today, Omni Dukaan network has grown to 42,100 agents in Pakistan.

In January 2011, Bestway Group increased its shareholding in UBL to 51.07% by acquiring an additional 20% of the shares from the Abu Dhabi Group. This was a total investment of US$230.0 million in Pakistan's second-largest private commercial bank. The Bank added 200 branches in 2011 and 2012, thus increasing its domestic network to over 1,300 online branches with 800 ATMs. In June 2012, UBL led a consortium which acquired a 67.4% stake in Khushhali Bank, which is the largest micro-finance institution in Pakistan.

In December 2013, the Bestway Group increased its shareholding in UBL to 61.37% by acquiring an additional 10.3% of the shares from the Abu Dhabi Group. Through an investment of over $120 million, the Bestway Group acquired the entire shareholding of its former joint venture partner, the Abu Dhabi Group.

In June 2014, the Government of Pakistan sold its remaining 19.8% stake in UBL for US$387 million ($310m of which was in foreign exchange). This was Pakistan's first transaction in the global equity market in almost eight years.

In 2017, the Securities and Exchange Commission of Pakistan (SECP) filed a criminal case against Khalid Iqbal, head of capital markets at United Bank Limited, and three of his accomplices for front running. The case involved two unusual purchases of Gharibwal Cement Limited shares by UBL, authorized by Iqbal. Investigations revealed that Iqbal's accomplices bought shares at lower prices and sold them to UBL at higher prices. The court convicted all four individuals, concluding that they made illegal profits and caused financial losses to UBL.

In November 2018, UBL announced that it was voluntarily shutting down its New York City branch due to it being commercially nonviable to operate. UBL announced on 12 June 2021 that it was winding up its wholly owned Switzerland subsidiary, UBL (Switzerland) AG, which it had owned since 1967. The process completed on 2 June 2023. UBL announced on 12 September 2023 that its largest shareholder, Bestway Group, had submitted an "Indicative Offer" to acquire UBL's 55% shareholding in its United Kingdom joint venture with the National Bank of Pakistan, United National Bank Limited "UNBL UK". This was approved by the Board of Directors of UBL but is conditional on the approval of the State Bank of Pakistan. In March 2024, Silkbank announced its merger with United Bank Limited after both banks reached an agreement. On March 10, 2025, the State Bank of Pakistan (SBP) officially sanctioned the amalgamation of Silkbank with UBL under Section 48 of the Banking Companies Ordinance 1962. The merger became effective on March 11, 2025, fully integrating Silkbank's operations into UBL. As part of the agreement, UBL issued new shares to Silkbank shareholders at a swap ratio of 1 UBL share (face value PKR 10 each) for every 325 Silkbank shares (face value PKR 10 each).

== Operations ==
As of 2024, UBL generated ~67% of its net income through its loans and advances, investments, and lending to financial institutions.

=== Commercial Banking ===
==== National Operations ====
As of 2024, UBL's commercial banking division maintained extensive presence through Pakistan with over 1,360 branches and 1,440 ATMs over the country. The commercial banking division is the largest within the company, offering a range of financial services to individual consumers and small businesses. These services include banking and investment solutions, merchant services, and various lending products such as business loans and debit cards as well as car and home financing through the UBL DRIVE and UBL ADDRESS facilities. In the same year, the bank held ~PKR 2.5 billion in customer deposits and gave out ~PKR 1.4 billion in advances.

==== International Operations ====
The bank also maintains a direct presence in the United Arab Emirates, Bahrain, and Qatar, with 9 branches spread across major cities. In the United Kingdom, UBL functioned through its subsidiary, UBL UK, which is regulated by the Prudential Regulation Authority and the Financial Conduct Authority. In July 2024, UBL sold its entire stake in the subsidiary to Bestway Group for US$32.6 million.

Historically, UBL has had operations in various other countries, including the United States, Switzerland, and Oman. However, over time, the bank has streamlined its international operations, focusing on markets with significant Pakistani expatriate populations and strategic business opportunities.

=== Corporate and Investment Banking ===
==== Corporate Banking ====
UBL's corporate banking division, headquartered in Karachi with offices in Lahore, Islamabad, Faisalabad and Multan, provides firms working capital solutions, trade financing and medium to long-term loans. The bank's integrated approach ensures that the corporate banking division has cross-departmental expertise from their transaction, investment, treasury, and Islamic banking teams.

In May 2023, UBL advanced its digital banking capabilities by implementing the Temenos Corporate Loan Origination solution, aiming to streamline the corporate lending process, encompassing loan initiation, credit approval management, risk assessment, and collateral management.

==== Investment Banking Group ====
Founded in 2002, UBL's Investment Banking Group maintains presence in 11 countries including the Middle East, UK, and Switzerland. The division is actively involved in project and structured finance, offering advisory and arrangement services for Public-Private Partnerships (PPPs), mergers and acquisitions, and equity transactions. The bank assists clients with risk assessment, regulatory compliance, financial modeling, and capital structuring.

=== Asset Management and Wealth Management ===
United Bank Limited operates its asset management services through its wholly owned subsidiary, UBL Fund Managers Limited (UBL FM), established in 2001. UBL FM holds licenses to provide asset management, investment advisory, and pension fund management services. As of November 2024, UBL FM managed assets totaling PKR 314 billion. UBL FM has been rated AM1 by JCR-VIS Credit Rating Agency. UBL FM offers a range of investment products, including conventional and Islamic mutual funds, pension schemes, and customized portfolio management services.

The bank's Signature Priority Banking serves as the wealth management arm of the firm, available only to clients who maintain a minimum quarterly average balance of PKR 3 million. The division provides investment advisory services that include customized portfolio management.

== FinCEN ==
United Bank was named in the FinCEN Files, published by BuzzFeed News and the International Consortium of Investigative Journalists (ICIJ). It had eight suspicious transactions from 2011 to 2012 flagged, totaling to US$399,620.

== Subsidiaries ==
- UBL Fund Managers Limited
- UBL Insurers Limited
- UBL OMNI
- UFSL UBL Financials Services Ltd

== See also ==
- United Bank Limited cricket team
