= Symbol group =

Retail business model

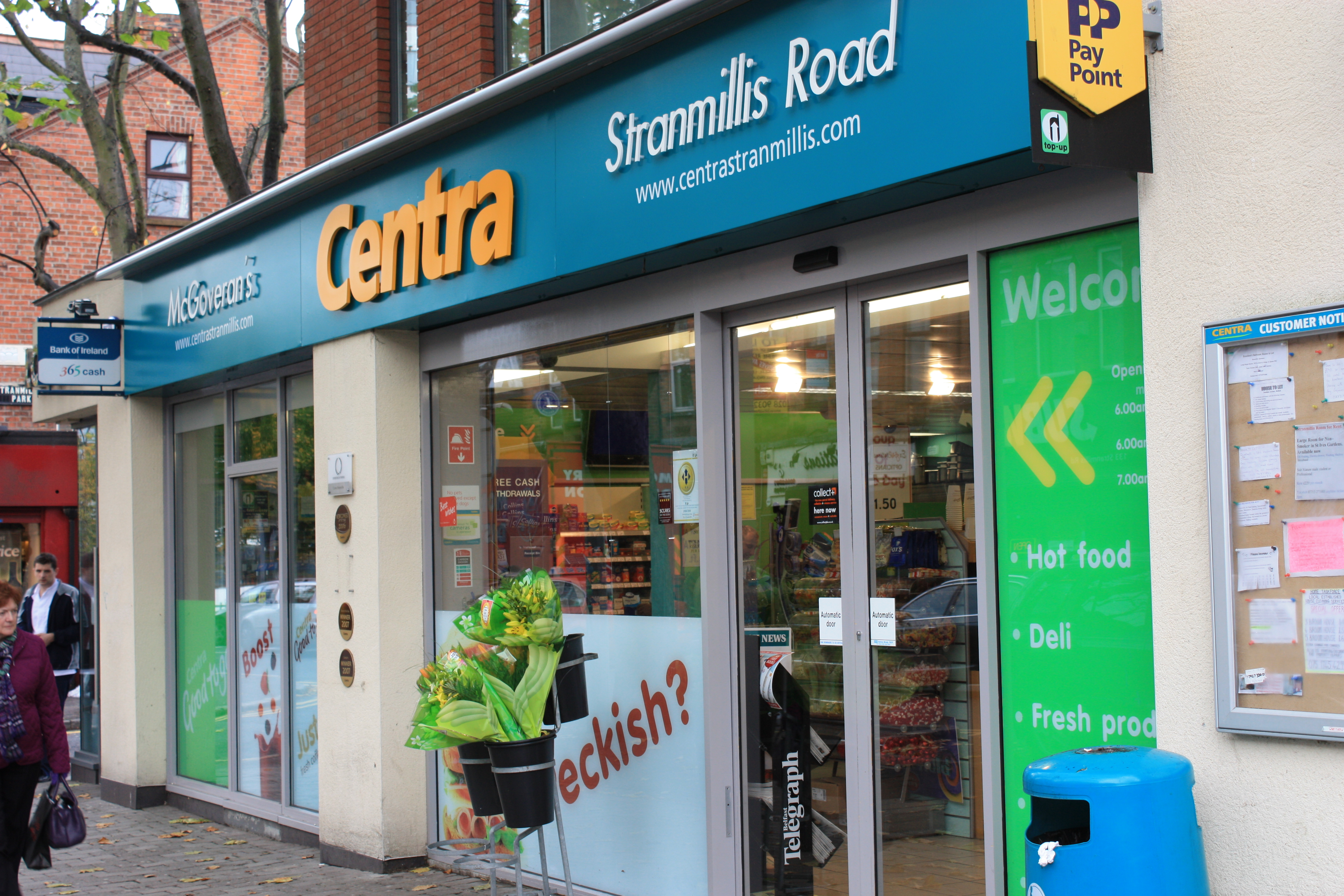
An example of a Centra shop on Stranmills Road, Belfast, Northern Ireland, 2009

A symbol group is a form of franchise of convenience shops, found primarily in the United Kingdom and Ireland. They do not own or operate shops, but act as suppliers to independent shops which then trade under a common banner.

Unlike other forms of franchise, they have expanded primarily by selling their services to existing shops, rather than by actively developing new outlets. Examples of such franchises are Spar, Londis, Nisa Local and Centra.

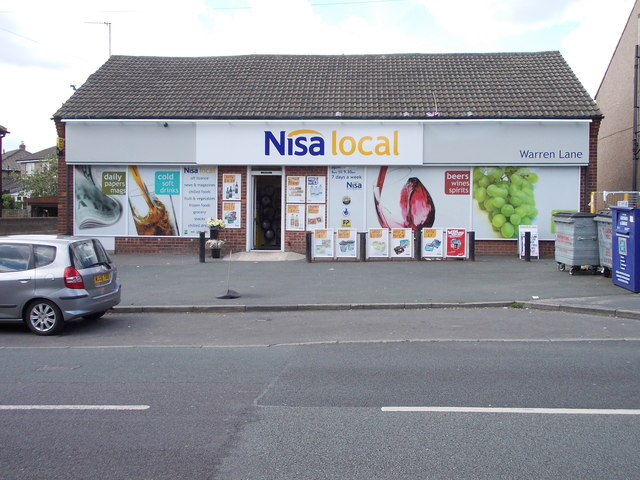
An example of a Nisa Local shop in Bingley, Bradford, 2012

== Groups ==
Symbol groups include:

- Centra
- SuperValu
- Mace
- Spar
- Gala
- Best-one, Bargain Booze and Wine Rack (part of Bestway Wholesale)
- Costcutter - 2,600 shops (part of Bestway Wholesale, supplied by Cooperative Group until 2026)
- Nisa - 2,400 shops (part of The Co-operative Group)
- Premier Stores - 3,400 shops (part of Booker Group)
- Londis and Budgens - 1,800 shops (part of Booker Group)

Booker Group is a wholly owned subsidiary of Tesco.

== Market ==
In 2014, the Institute of Grocery Distribution (IGD) reported that the symbol group market is worth £15.5bn, with a 42% share of the UK convenience market through 17,080 shops.

In the 2010s there was significant consolidation in the sector, as Tesco purchased Booker and the Co-operative Group purchased Nisa.

== See also ==
- Co-op Food which has a similar corporate structure, although is not usually considered a symbol group.
- Edeka and REWE, German grocery chains with structures similar to a symbol group
