= Anwar Pervez =

Pakistani-born British billionaire

Sir Anwar Pervez OBE, HPk
- Born: 15 March 1935 (age 91); Rawalpindi, British India (now Pakistan)
- Citizenship: British and Pakistani dual citizenship
- Occupations: Chairman, Bestway
- Spouse: Sabiha Kasim
- Children: 4, including Dawood Pervez
- Relatives: Zameer Choudrey (nephew)

Sir Mohammed Anwar Pervez OBE, HPk (Urdu: سر انور پرویز; born 15 March 1935) is a Pakistani-born British billionaire businessman. He is the founder and chairman of Bestway Group.

According to the Sunday Times Rich List, in 2020 Pervez's net worth was £3.1 billion, and the richest Pakistan-born Briton in the UK. The 2021 list gave his family's assets as £1.364 billion, placing them 125th on the list.

== Early life ==
Mohammed Anwar Pervez was born on 15 March 1935 to a subsistence farming family in Rawalpindi, then under British rule. He did his matriculation in Pakistan. He studied at Forman Christian College. In 1956, he moved to the UK at the age of 21.

== Career ==
His first paid employment was as a telephone operator for Pakistan's state-owned telecommunications company PTCL. At PTCL, he used to work for Rs. 96 a month and most of it was spent on anti-malaria medications.

In 1956, Pervez emigrated to England. He initially worked as a bus conductor and driver in Bradford. He worked seven days a week on double shifts for about £16-£18 a week.

In 1961, Pervez partnered with a friend and opened a shop in London. The partnership led to the purchase of a house in Kilburn, accumulating savings of nearly £4,000. After a seven-month visit to Pakistan, Pervez established his convenience store, Kashmir, in Earl's Court, specializing in Asian food products. Observing the demand for extended shopping hours, he expanded his business operations to accommodate both local residents and tourists.

From 1963 to 1968, Pervez focused on operating specialized Asian shops in South Kensington before serving a wider community. To address high supplier costs, he transitioned his business into the wholesale business, maintaining low profit margins to offer competitive prices.

In 1976, using personal funds and investments from friends, Pervez founded Bestway as a trade-only wholesaler. He opened Bestway's first wholesale warehouse in Acton, West London.

In 1987, Pervez established the Bestway Foundation, which allocates 2.5% of the group's profits to educational and health initiatives.

Bestway has since grown to a multibillion-pound enterprise, and as of 2014 Bestway is the second-largest independent wholesaler in the UK. In 2014, his group bought 774 pharmacies from The Co-operative Group for £620 million.

== Personal life ==
He is currently married to his second wife Sabiha Kasim with whom he had four children. A son from his first marriage and another from his second are directors of Bestway.

In 2012, their daughter married Syed Abid Hussain Imam, the son of Pakistani politicians Abida Hussain and Fakhar Imam.

== Honours ==
Pervez was made an Officer of the Order of the British Empire in 1992 and a Knight Bachelor in 1999.

In March 2000, he was awarded Hilal-i-Pakistan by the Pakistani Government for his services to Pakistan.

== See also ==
- List of British Pakistanis
- Pakistan United Kingdom relations
