= Costcutter =

Franchise of convenience shops

- Logo used in the UK since 2016

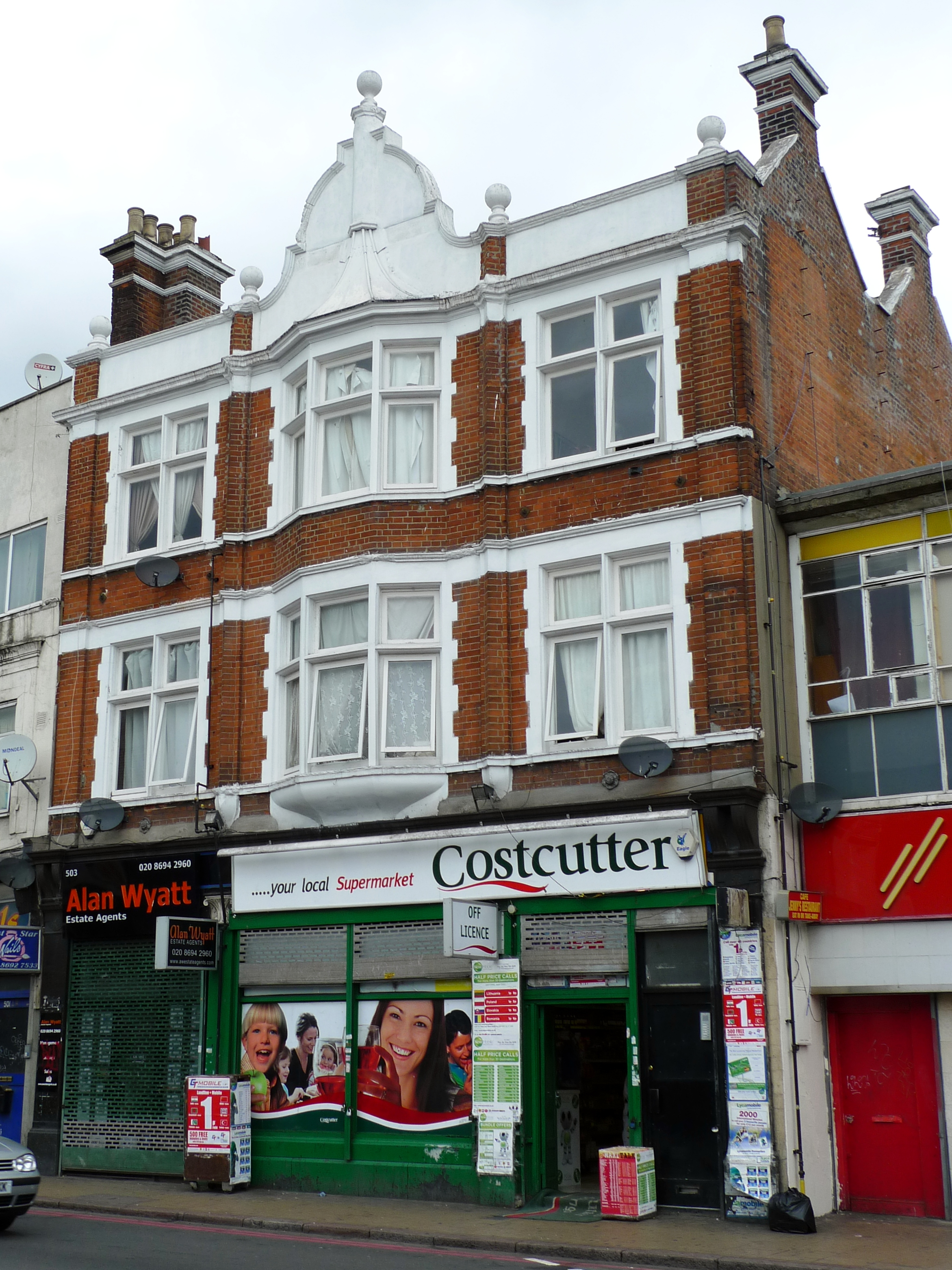
- Costcutter shop in Deptford, London
- Type: Franchising
- Industry: Retail
- Founded: 1986; 40 years ago
- Headquarters: Upper Quartertown, Mallow, County Cork (Irish business); Dunnington, North Yorkshire, England (UK business)
- Number of locations: 1,400
- Area served: United Kingdom; Ireland
- Products: Grocer's shop, convenience shops
- Parent: Barry Group (Costcutter Ireland); Bestway Wholesale (Costcutter UK)
- Website: www.costcutter.ie www.costcutter.co.uk

Costcutter is a name used by two convenience shop symbol groups in the United Kingdom and the Republic of Ireland. It previously had stores in Poland. The shops are independently owned and join the groups, paying a fee for marketing and branding support and purchasing their stock from the brand owners.

As of 2025, the Costcutter network includes over 1,200 shops in the United Kingdom and over 120 in Ireland.

== United Kingdom ==
Logo used in the UK until 2016, and in Ireland until 2024

Costcutter was founded in 1986, by Colin Graves.

A proposed merger with Nisa-Today's collapsed in November 2006, after concerns about a cartel. which were reported to the Office of Fair Trading by members of Nisa-Today's, who opposed the merger.

Costcutter revived the Kwik Save brand in 2012, from a separate chain which had ceased trading.

In 2018, The Co-op Group made an offer of £15 million in an attempt to take ownership of Costcutter. The bid was rejected, but it was believed the Costcutter was open to further talks. The Co-op subsequently became the sole supplier to the Costcutter group.

In 2020, during the Covid-19 pandemic, Costcutter built 20 pop-up shops in NHS hospitals.

In December 2020, Costcutter's UK business was acquired by Bestway Wholesale. The Co-op supply agreement will continue until 2026.

== Republic of Ireland ==
In 2000, the brand entered the Irish market as a separate business under the ownership of Barry Group.

In 2024, Costcutter Ireland ditched its previous logo with a new one, still different from the one in the UK in being all red rather than green and red.

== Poland ==
Costcutter expanded into Poland in the mid-2000s, operating 52 stores by 2006. The brand later withdrew from the country and no longer operates there.

== Other sources ==
- Vantage chiefs in MBO row
- Barry's buys 24 shop franchises
- Costcutter, Vantage in strategic link-up
