= Primary care network =

Part of the National Health Service in England

A Primary care network is a structure which brings general practitioners together on an area basis, possibly with other clinicians, to address chronic disease management and prevention. As of 2022, the term is used in England, Singapore and Alberta.

== England ==
Primary care networks were introduced into the National Health Service in England as part of the NHS Long Term Plan, published in January 2019. The 2019 General Practitioner contract gave the opportunity for GP practices to join networks, each with between 30,000 and 50,000 patients. The stated aim is to create fully integrated community-based health services which will be an important component of integrated care systems. They are based on GP registered patient lists, and intended to serve natural communities of between 30,000 and 50,000 people. It is the location of the GP, not the patient, which determines which one a patient is attached to.

By June 2019 1,259 primary care networks had been established across England, with an average population covered of about 42,000 patients, and including all but about 55 practices. About 25 had decided not to participate.

Networks are required to deliver seven national service specifications. Structured medication reviews, enhanced health in care homes, anticipatory care (with community services), personalised care and supporting early cancer diagnosis were to start by April 2020. Cardiovascular disease case-finding and locally agreed action to tackle inequalities are to start in 2021.

This model was pioneered by the vanguard projects established under 2014's Five Year Forward View. The networks will hold local contracts for enhanced services. They will have 'expanded neighbourhood teams', which the plan envisages 'will comprise a range of staff such as GPs, pharmacists, district nurses, community geriatricians, dementia workers and allied health professionals such as physiotherapists and podiatrists/chiropodists, joined by social care and the voluntary sector'.

Evidence of the effectiveness of this approach is rather limited, according to a 2019 review in the Health Policy journal.

Modality Partnership and Our Health Partnership, two of the biggest GP super-partnerships, proposed in 2019 to lead networks across the country, which may include practices not in their organisations.

=== Staffing ===
Funding is provided for the employment of clinical pharmacists and social prescribing link workers in 2019/20, and subsequently for physiotherapists, physician associates and paramedics. Each network was given £37,810 to fund a clinical pharmacist post for 2019/2020, to cover 70% of the costs, with the network expected to cover the rest. The intention is that each network will have five clinical pharmacists by 2024 – about one per practice – providing altogether an additional 7,500 pharmacists. In June 2022 there were 3,294 full-time equivalent pharmacists recorded as working in primary care networks, an increase of about 700 since 2021.

In November 2019 NHS England announced a change in financial rules which will permit networks to meet management costs of the charities and other organisations which supply social prescriber link workers.

The NHS Confederation has established a Primary Care Network which is intended to be a voice for the sector.

== Alberta ==
In Alberta primary care networks (PCNs) are partnerships between a groups of family physicians and Alberta Health Services which work with teams of health care professionals, such as nurses, dietitians and pharmacists. 84% of primary care physicians are registered with them and close to 3.8 million Albertans are enrolled with a PCN. The Calgary Foothills Primary Care Network alone is one of the largest in the province, serving nearly 500,000 Albertans.

There is a Provincial PCN Committee which includes representatives from PCNs, Alberta Health Services, the Alberta Federation of Regulated Health Professionals and the Alberta Medical Association.

To help address ongoing physician shortages and increased demand for services, Alberta’s Primary Care Networks employ a variety of strategies, including team-based care, preventive health programs, and the integration of allied health professionals such as nurses, social workers, and pharmacists. PCNs also leverage digital health technologies, including electronic medical records (EMRs) to improve care coordination and efficiency. Some PCNs are beginning to adopt artificial intelligence (AI) tools embedded within EMRs, such as automated documentation and clinical decision support, to further streamline workflows and support clinical teams.

== Singapore ==
The Singapore Ministry of Health introduced the Primary Care Networks scheme to encourage private General Practitioner clinics to organise themselves into networks that support more holistic and team-based care. They have a multi-disciplinary team including doctors, nurses and primary care coordinators. Diabetic foot and eye screening, and nurse counselling is included. From January 2018 ten PCNs were in operation.
